= Bishop Okoye Spiritan Secondary School =

Coordinates: 4°51′3.89″N 7°13′9.12″E

Location
- No.1 Spritan Close Mirinwayi Asa, Afam Road; Oyibo, Rivers State, P.M.B. 5038; Nigeria

Information
- Type: Private Catholic Non-profit Coeducational Secondary education institution
- Motto: Faith, Knowledge For Service
- Religious affiliation: Roman Catholic (Spiritan)
- Established: September 2006
- Founder: Congregation of the Holy Spirit (Spiritans)
- School district: Diocese of Port Harcourt
- Principal: Rev. Fr. Jude Ekemgba, C.S.Sp.
- Gender: co-educational
- Website: www.bosss.sch.ng

Bishop Okoye Spiritan Secondary School (often abbreviated as BOSSS), is a private, coeducational Roman Catholic high school in Oyigbo, Rivers State, Nigeria. It is located in the Roman Catholic Diocese of Port Harcourt. The school is named in honor of the first Bishop of the Port Harcourt diocese, Bishop Godfrey Okoye, whose contributions to the educational system in Southeastern Nigeria were far-reaching. The school's main campus is situated on a large area of land in the town of Afam, covering more than 300 plots of land.

== School overview ==
BOSSS is owned and operated by the congregation of the Holy Ghost Fathers and Brothers South East Province of Nigeria. The school also offers boarding services to students of all nationalities. The current principal is Rev. Fr. Jude Ekemgba, C.S.Sp.

== Admission ==
As many students move from various curricula, prospective students are required to sit for an entrance examination. The school organizes an informal interview with the student which forms part of the overall assessment. Admission is at the school's discretion and the school's decision is final. However, unsuccessful applicants may apply again at a later date if they believe they will do better at the entrance examinations.

== See also ==
- Godfrey Okoye
- List of schools in Port Harcourt
- List of Roman Catholic churches in Port Harcourt
