= Ibom plaza =

Ibom Plaza
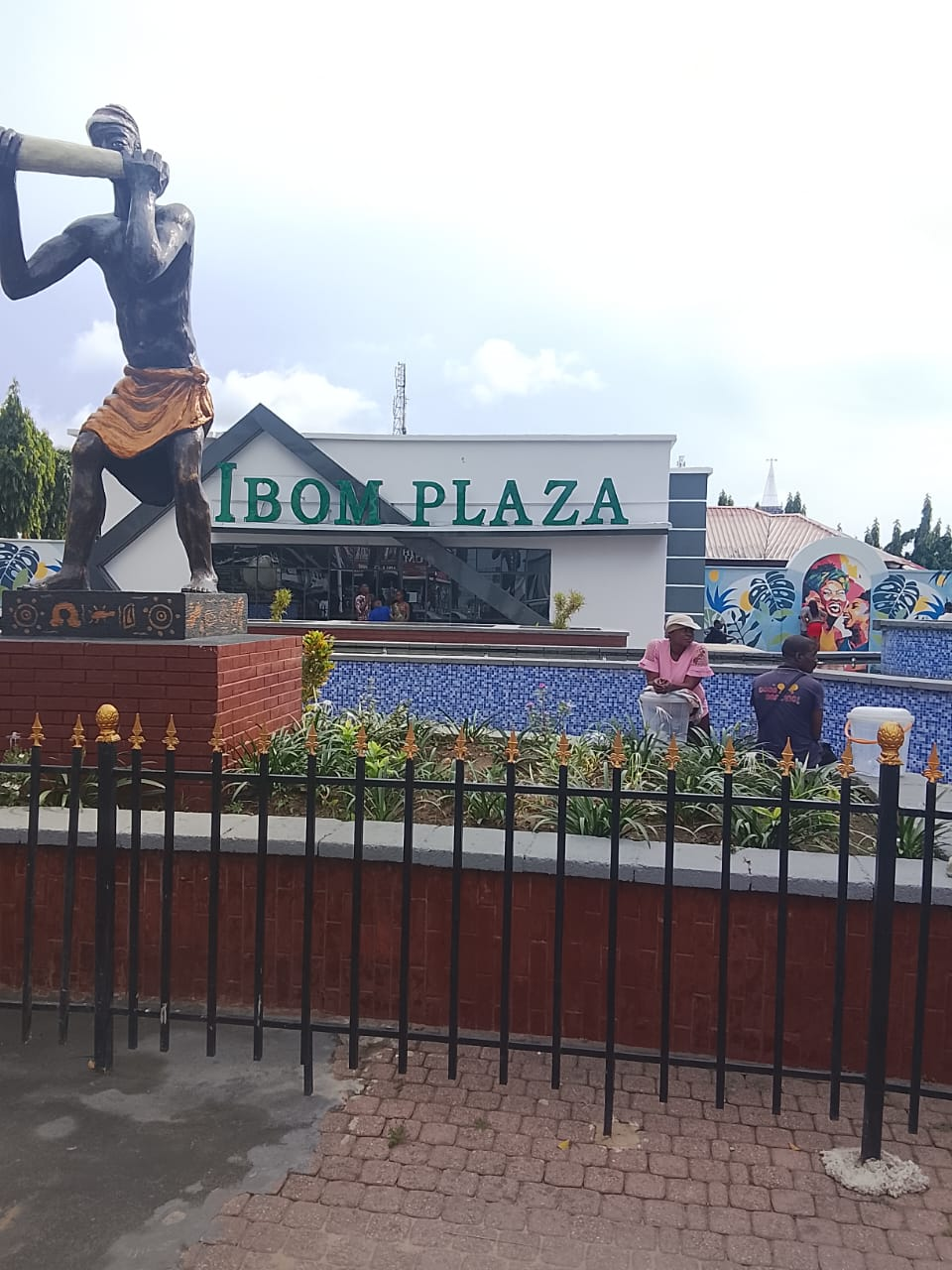
- Ibom Plaza, Uyo

General information
- Status: Active
- Type: Public plaza / commercial hub
- Location: Uyo, Akwa Ibom State, Nigeria
- Owner: Akwa Ibom State Government

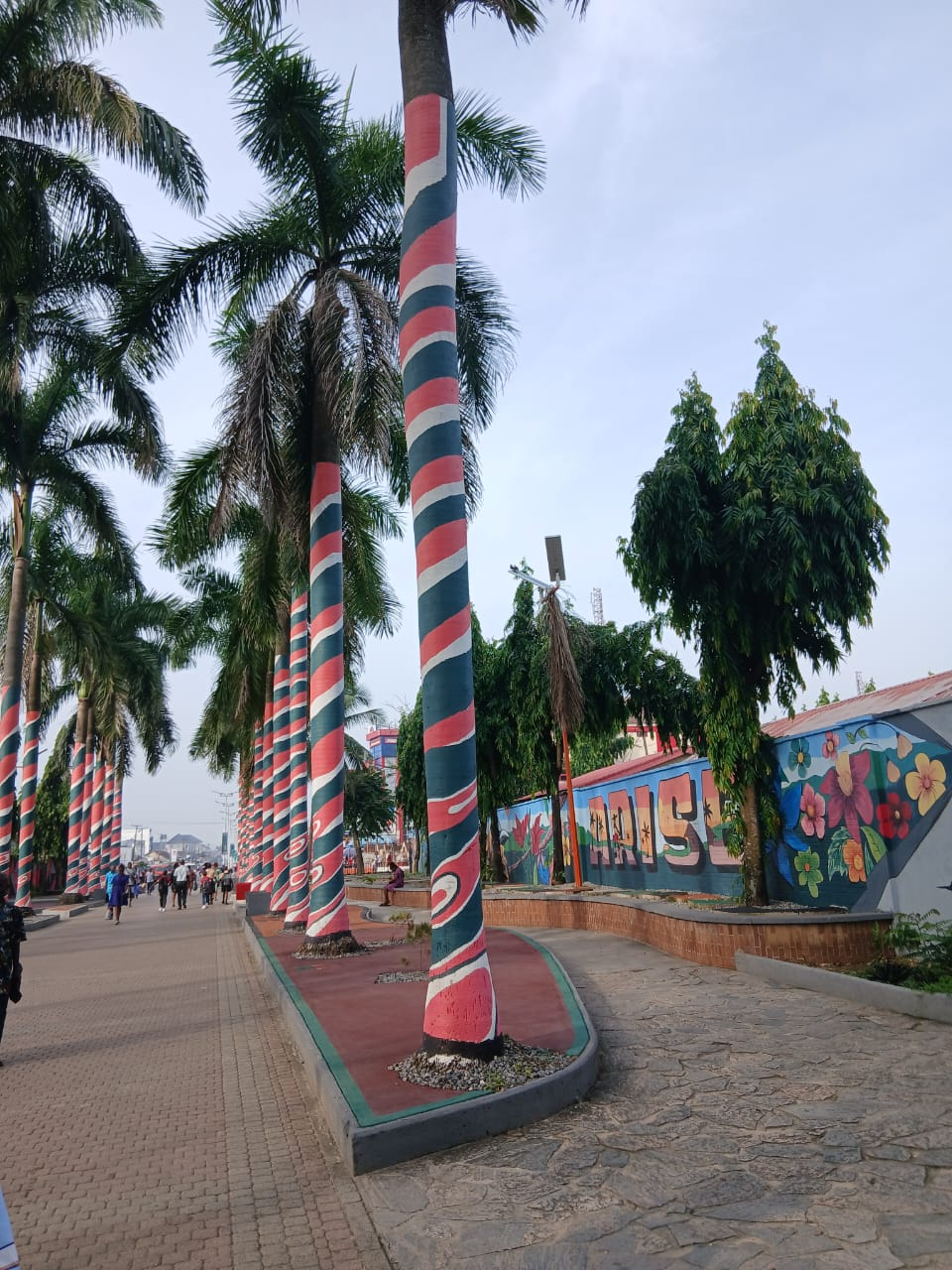
Ibom plaza

Ibom Plaza is a major public and commercial space located in the heart of Uyo, the capital city of Akwa Ibom State, Nigeria. It serves as a civic, recreational, and commercial hub, hosting shopping, social gatherings, and cultural activities.

Ibom Plaza sits in the heart of Uyo, Akwa Ibom State, near the convergence of Aka Road, Ikot Ekpene Road, and Abak Road, and was built on what was formerly known as Independent Square, a site of historical significance where the British Union Jack flag was lowered after Nigerian independence. The plaza features landscaped areas, open arenas, water fountains, and spaces designed for relaxation, shopping, and entertainment.

== Function and Features ==
The plaza serves multiple purposes:

- A relaxation and gathering space for families, friends, and visitors.
- A commercial center with shops, stalls, and other business activities, attracting traders from across the region.
- A venue for public events, entertainment, and cultural activities, including music, dance, and communal gatherings.

== Development and Challenges ==
Over time, the plaza faced infrastructural wear and issues with informal trading around the area, leading to public concerns about maintenance and security.

== Refurbishment and Management ==
In December 2025, the Akwa Ibom State Government and the Uyo Capital City Development Authority have refurbished the plaza, improving facilities, landscaping, security, and lighting. The refurbishment restored Ibom Plaza as a vibrant hub for commerce, recreation, and cultural activities.

== See also ==
- Uyo
- Akwa Ibom State
- Ibom E-Library
- Ibom Hotels and Golf Resort
- Ibom Air
- Ibom Specialist Hospital
- Ibom Tropicana Entertainment Centre
