= St. Mary's Catholic Model High School =

Location
- 33 Harbour Road; Port Harcourt, Rivers State; Nigeria; 4°45′49″N 7°0′45″E

Information
- Type: Independent, Co-educational, Day and Boarding
- Motto: "Faith, Knowledge and Love" (Latin: Fides, Notitia et Amor)
- Religious affiliation: Roman Catholic
- Patron saint: Mary, mother of Jesus
- Established: 25 September 2006 (19 years ago)
- School district: Diocese of Port Harcourt
- Principal: Rev. Sr. Mary Breda Chilaka
- Chaplain: Rev. Fr. John Dumale
- Gender: Mixed
- Website: stmaryscathmsph.com

St. Mary's Catholic Model High School is an independent, co-educational, Catholic, day and boarding school, located in Port Harcourt, Rivers State, Nigeria. As its name indicates, its patron saint is Mary, mother of Jesus. Its motto is "Faith, Knowledge and Love". The school was founded and officially opened on 25 September 2006. The proprietor is His Lordship, Most Rev. Camillus Archibong Etokudoh.

== Administration ==
Located within the Diocese of Port Harcourt, the school is run by the Sisters of the Immaculate Heart of Mary, Mother of Christ. The sixth and current chaplain is Rev. Fr. John Dumale while the school principal is Rev. Sr. Mary Breda Chilaka.

=== Chaplains ===
Former chaplains of the school include:

- Rt. Rev. Monsignor Peter Ohochukwu
- Rev. Father Joseph Abah
- Rev. Father Leo Eke
- Rev. Father Poroma
- Rev. Father Felix Odu

== See also ==
- Education in Nigeria
- List of Roman Catholic churches in Port Harcourt
