= Patrick Eluke =

Nigerian Catholic prelate (born 1967)

The Most Reverend Patrick Eluke
- Auxiliary Bishop of Port Harcourt, Nigeria
- Church: Catholic Church
- Archdiocese: Roman Catholic Archdiocese of Calabar
- See: Diocese of Port Harcourt
- Appointed: 12 February 2019
- Installed: 9 May 2019

Orders
- Ordination: 23 September 1995
- Consecration: 9 May 2019 by Antonio Guido Filipazzi
- Rank: Bishop

Personal details
- Born: Patrick S. Eluke; 25 March 1967 (age 59) Ekpeye, Ahoada, Diocese of Port Harcourt, Rivers State, Nigeria

Styles of Patrick Eluke
- Reference style: Your Lordship; The Most Reverend
- Spoken style: His Lordship
- Religious style: Bishop

Patrick S. Eluke (born 25 March 1967) is a Nigerian Catholic prelate who serves as the Auxiliary Bishop of the Diocese of Port Harcourt. He was appointed bishop on 12 February 2019 by Pope Francis, and received his episcopal consecration on the 9th of May by Antonio Guido Filipazzi. He was also titular bishop of Photice. On 9 April 2025, Eluke was appointed the apostolic administrator of the Diocese of Port Harcourt.

== Background ==
Eluke was born on 25 March 1967 in Ekpeye, Ahoada, Rivers State, Nigeria. He attended Sacred Heart Minor Seminary for his secondary education. He was admitted into Bigard Memorial Seminary in Ikot-Ekpene and in Enugu, where he studied philosophy and theology respectively. He obtained his doctorate in biblical studies from the University of Port Harcourt.

== Priestly ministry ==
Eluke was ordained a priest on 23 September 1995 for the Diocese of Port Harcourt. He worked as the parish vicar of Saint Anthony's parish in Igwuruta from 1995 to 1996. He served as parish pastor at St. Bernard's parish, Biara from 1996 to 1997; St. Dominic's parish, Bane from 1997 to 2002; St. Francis' parish, Kpean from 1997 to 2002; St. Paul's parish, Ngo from 1997 to 2005; Saints Peter and Paul parish, Elenlenwo from 2005 to 2007; Queen of the Apostles parish, Rumuepirikom from 2007 to 2012; Sacred Heart parish, Mile II Diobu from 2012 to 2013. He became the Chaplain of the Annunciation Chaplaincy, University of Port Harcourt from 2013 to 2015 and as a lecturer of Biblical Studies in the same university from 2014 to 2019. Eluke worked as parish priest of St. Francis of Assisi parish, Rumuokwuta from 2015 to 2019 before becoming the director of the pastoral vocational ministry from 2016 to 2019.

On 12 February 2019, Pope Francis appointed Eluke as the auxiliary bishop of the Diocese of Port Harcourt. He was also appointed as the titular bishop of Photice. He was consecrated on 9 May 2019 by Antonio Guido Filipazzi, the papal nuncio to Nigeria. Co-consecrators included Joseph Effiong Ekuwem, the Archbishop of Calabar and Camillus Archibong Etokudoh, the bishop emeritus of Port Harcourt. On 9 April 2025, after Etokudoh's resignation, Pope Francis appointed Eluke as the apostolic administrator of the Diocese of Port Harcourt.
