= Diocese of Ogoja =

Roman Catholic diocese in Cross River State, Nigeria

Diocese of Ogoja Dioecesis Ogogiaensis

Location
- Country: Nigeria
- Territory: Cross River State
- Ecclesiastical province: Calabar
- Metropolitan: Calabar
- Coordinates: 6°30′0″N 8°40′0″E

Statistics
- Area: 12,557 km^{2} (4,848 sq mi)
- Population: Total; Catholics: (as of 2018); 3,335,000; 1,053,000 (31.6%)
- Parishes: 79

Information
- Denomination: Catholic Church
- Sui iuris church: Latin Church
- Rite: Roman Rite
- Established: January 1, 1955
- Cathedral: Saint Benedict Cathedral in Ogoja
- Patron saint: Saint Benedict
- Secular priests: 149

Current leadership
- Pope: Leo XIV
- Bishop: Most Rev. Donatus Edet Akpan

Map
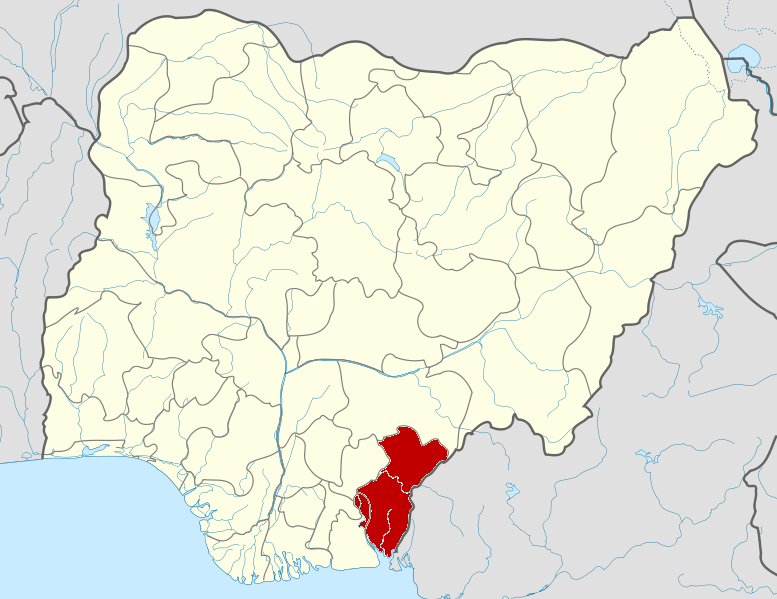
- Ogoja is located in Cross River State which is shown here in red.

The Diocese of Ogoja (Latin: Ogogiaën(sis)) is a Latin Church ecclesiastical territory or diocese of the Catholic Church in Nigeria. It is a suffragan diocese in the ecclesiastical province of the metropolitan Archdiocese of Calabar, yet still depends on the missionary Roman Congregation for the Evangelization of Peoples.

Its cathedra is in Saint Benedict Cathedral, dedicated to diocesan patron saint Saint Benedict, in the episcopal see of Ogoja, in Cross River State.

== History ==
- Established on March 13, 1938 as Apostolic Prefecture of Ogoja, on territory split off from the then Apostolic Prefecture of Calabar (now its Metropolitan)
- 1955.01.01: Promoted as Diocese of Ogoja/ Ogogiaën(sis) (Latin)
- On 1973.03.01 it lost territory to establish the Diocese of Abakaliki.

== Statistics ==
As per 2014, it pastorally served 902,975 Catholics (32.5% of 2,779,037 total) on 12,557 km^{2} in 65 parishes with 99 priests (96 diocesan, 3 religious), 50 lay religious (3 brothers, 47 sisters) and 137 seminarians.

== Ordinaries ==
Apostolic Prefects of Ogoja

- Patrick Joseph Whitney, Saint Patrick’s Society for the Foreign Missions (S.P.S.) (born Ireland) (1938 – retired 1939), died 1942; previously Founder of Saint Patrick’s Society for the Foreign Missions (1932.03.17)
- Thomas McGettrick, S.P.S. (born Ireland) (1939.11.10 – 1955.01.01 see below)

Suffragan Bishops of Ogoja

- Thomas McGettrick, S.P.S. (see above 1955.01.01 – 1973.03.01), later Bishop of Abakaliki (Nigeria) (1973.03.01 – death 1983.02.19)
- Joseph Edra Ukpo (first native incumbent) (1973.03.01 – 2003.12.17), succeeding as former auxiliary bishop of Ogoja and Titular Bishop of Chullu (1971.04.24 – 1973.03.01); later Metropolitan Archbishop of Calabar (Nigeria) (2003.12.17 – retired 2013.02.02)
- John Ebebe Ayah (2006.10.14 – 2014.07.05), stayed on a while as Apostolic Administrator of Ogoja (2014.07.05 – 2017.04.09) while Bishop of Uyo (Nigeria) (2014.07.05 – ...)
- Donatus Edet Akpan (2017.04.09 – ...), no previous prelature.

== Deaneries ==
- Abuochiche
- Agbokim
- Bansara
- Edor
- Idum
- Ikom
- Kakwagom
- Obubra
- Obudu
- Ogoja
- Okuku
- Ohong
- Sankwala
- Ugep
- Wanakom
- Wula

== See also ==
- List of Catholic dioceses in Nigeria
- Roman Catholicism in Nigeria

== Sources and external links ==
- GCatholic.org, with Google satellite photo - data for all sections
- Catholic Hierarchy
