= Holy Rosary College =

Location
- 1 Isaac Boro Street; Old GRA, Port Harcourt, Rivers State; Nigeria; 4°47′29″N 7°0′19″E

Information
- Type: Private, all-girls
- Motto: Praestantia per laborem ("Excellence through work")
- Religious affiliation: Roman Catholic
- Established: 1956
- School district: Diocese of Port Harcourt
- Principal: Veronica Efika
- Gender: Female
- Website: http://www.horoco.com.ng

Holy Rosary College (previously known as Holy Rosary Secondary School), is a Roman Catholic, all-girls secondary school in Old GRA, a neighborhood of Port Harcourt, the capital of Rivers State, Nigeria.

== History ==
It was established in 1956 and is run by the Holy Rosary Sisters. It is located in the Diocese of Port Harcourt, currently led by Camillus Archibong Etokudoh. The serving principal, as of February 2014 is Veronica Efika.

== Notable alumni ==
- Ann-Kio Briggs - Environmental and human rights activist
- Felicity Okpete Ovai - engineer, academic
- Mary Uranta - actress
- Oge Okoye - Filmmaker and actress

== See also ==
- List of schools in Port Harcourt
- Roman Catholic Diocese of Port Harcourt
