= Bishop of Port Harcourt =

Leader of the Catholic Church in Port Harcourt

- Bishopric

catholic
- Incumbent: [[]]

Location
- Ecclesiastical province: Calabar

Information
- First holder: Godfrey Okoye
- Established: 1961
- Diocese: Port Harcourt
- Cathedral: Corpus Christi Cathedral

The Bishop of Port Harcourt is the Ordinary of the Roman Catholic Diocese of Port Harcourt in the ecclesiastical province of Calabar, Nigeria.

The diocese covers an area of 21,850 km^{2} (8,440 square miles). The Episcopal see is in Port Harcourt where the bishop's seat (cathedra) is located at the Corpus Christi Cathedral, D-line. The current bishop: [[]]

== List of the Bishops of Port Harcourt ==
Roman Catholic Bishops of Port Harcourt
From	Until	Incumbent	Notes
1961	1970	Godfrey Okoye	Bishop
1970	1973	Dominic Ignatius Ekandem	Apostolic Administrator
1973	1991	Edmund Joseph Fitzgibbon	Apostolic Administrator
1991	2009	Alexius Obabu Makozi	Bishop
2009	present	Camillus Archibong Etokudoh	Bishop

== See also ==
- List of Roman Catholic churches in Port Harcourt
- Roman Catholicism in Nigeria
