= Corpus Christi Cathedral (Port Harcourt) =

- Corpus et Sanguis Christi Cathedral
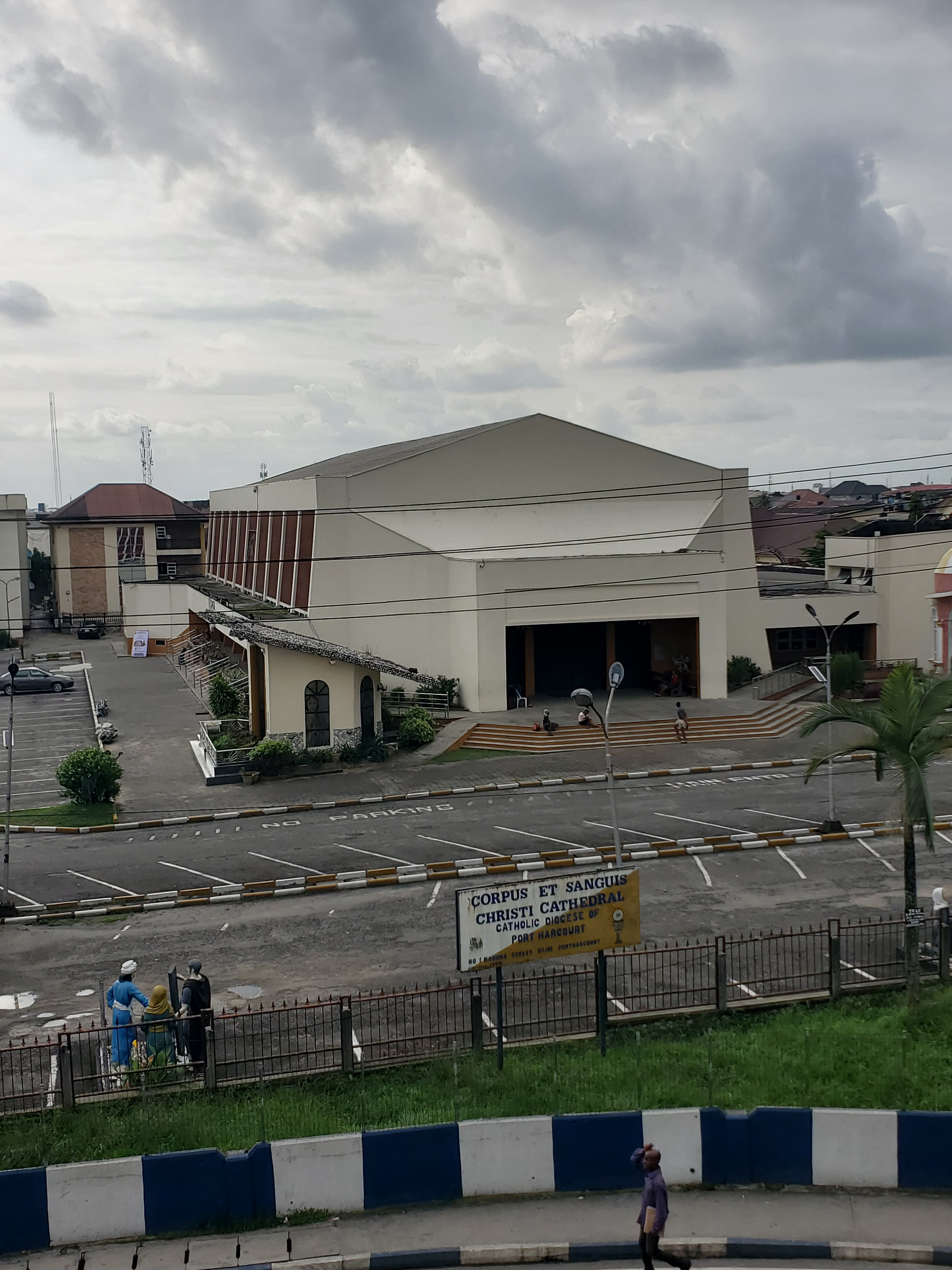
- Corpus et Sanguis Christi Cathedral
- Corpus Christi Cathedral
- 4°47′51″N 7°0′14″E
- Location: D-line, Port Harcourt, Rivers State
- Country: Nigeria
- Denomination: Roman Catholic
- Website: www.corpuschristicathedralph.org

History
- Status: Cathedral
- Founded: 1982
- Dedication: Bishop Edmund Fitzgibbon

Architecture
- Functional status: Active
- Architectural type: Church building
- Completed: 1991

Administration
- Diocese: Port Harcourt

Clergy
- Bishop: Most Rev. Dr. Camillus Archibong Etokudoh

The Corpus Christi Cathedral (or its full name Corpus et Sanguis Christi Cathedral) is a Roman Catholic cathedral in Port Harcourt, Rivers State, Nigeria. It is the seat of the Bishop of Port Harcourt and serves as the headquarters of the Diocese of Port Harcourt. The cathedral church is dedicated to Bishop Edmund Fitzgibbon. It is located in D-line, a mixed-use neighbourhood of Port Harcourt.

== History ==
Construction on the cathedral began in 1982 and was completed in 1991. Upon completion, Rev Fr. Joseph Kabari was posted from St. Mary’s parish to act as the cathedral's first administrator. The first mass was celebrated on Sunday 11 October 1991. The formal dedication ceremony was held on 8 December 1991.

== See also ==
- List of Roman Catholic churches in Port Harcourt
- Roman Catholic Diocese of Port Harcourt
