= Brian David Usanga =

Nigerian Catholic prelate

- Archbishop of Calabar
- Church: Catholic Church
- Archdiocese: Archdiocese of Calabar
- In office: 5 February 1970 – 17 December 2003
- Predecessor: James Moynagh
- Successor: Joseph Edra Ukpo
- Previous posts: Titular Bishop of Ubaba (1966-1970); Auxiliary Bishop of Calabar (1966-1970)

Orders
- Ordination: 8 December 1956
- Consecration: 4 December 1966 by Luigi Bellotti

Personal details
- Born: 28 October 1928
- Died: 26 May 2005 (aged 76)

Brian David Usanga (28 October 1928 – 26 May 2005) was a Nigerian Catholic prelate who served as the bishop of Calabar from 5 February 1970 until 26 May 1994 when the diocese was elevated to an Archdiocese. He continued as the Archbishop until 17 December 2003, when he resigned.

== Biography ==
Usanga was born on 28 October 1928. He studied philosophy and theology at Bigard Memorial Seminary in Enugu, Nigeria. He was ordained a priest for the diocese of Calabar on 8 December 1956 and he served as the assistant secretary for Catholic education in the diocese in 1957. In 1961, he left Nigeria for the US to study. He obtained a bachelor's degree in philosophy from St. Mary of the Plains College in Dodge City and a master's degree from Saint Louis University in 1963. In 1966, he received his doctorate in philosophical anthropology from the Catholic University of America in Washington DC.

On 5 August 1966, Pope Paul VI appointed him as the titular bishop of Ubaba and auxiliary bishop of Calabar. He received his episcopal consecration from Archbishop Luigi Bellotti on 4 December 1966 at the Church of Christ the King in Uyo, Nigeria. Co-consecrators were James Moynagh, bishop of Calabar and Dominic Ignatius Ekandem, bishop of Ikot-Ekpene. He also served as secretary of the Nigerian Episcopal Conference.

Pope Paul VI appointed Usanga the bishop of Calabar on 5 February 1970. He later became the first Archbishop of the diocese on 26 May 1994, following the elevation. On 17 December 2003, Pope John Paul II accepted his resignation.
