= Edmund Fitzgibbon (bishop) =

Styles of Edmund Fitzgibbon
- Reference style: The Most Reverend
- Spoken style: Your Excellency
- Religious style: Monsignor

Edmund Joseph Fitzgibbon (15 March 1925 – 17 April 2010) was the Bishop of the Catholic Diocese of Warri in Nigeria.

== Early life and education ==
Edmund Fitzgibbon was born in Ballylegan, County Cork, Ireland. He was ordained a priest on 9 April 1950, for the St. Patrick's Society for the Foreign Missions. On 25 November 1964, Fitzgibbon was appointed as the Prefect of Minna, Nigeria.

Bishop Edmund J. Fitzgibbon 1925–2010 opened Fatima Secondary School in January 1965 to cater for the education of girls and boys in the Minna area. It was also the first secondary in Minna town and the first secondary school to provide education for girls in Niger State. He also opened Maryamu Secondary School Bida 1966 Zuru Secondary School (now Kebbi State) 1966: Kontagora Technical College 1967. All these Schools including St. Malachy's Teachers College became Government Secondary in January 1973.

Fitzgibbon was also very much involved with youth. He trained the Calabar team that won the Governors’ cup in 1954. A street in Calabar is now named after Bishop Fitzgibbon. The Young Catholic Students movement came into Nigeria in 1959, It was Miss Freda O' Mahoney (now Mrs. Ogunade), with the help and support of the most Rev Dr Edmund Fitzgibbon (SMA), Bishop Emeritus of Warri, who introduced it in Nigeria. By 1965 it had become a national movement. From Nigeria, it spread to other English Speaking West African countries. All this while it was still known as Young Christian Students, until 1982 when the Bishop's Conference Of Nigeria (C.B.C.N) decided to change it to Young Catholic Students (Y.C.S).

== Episcopal appointments ==
On 20 November 1975, he was appointed Titular Bishop for Forum Traiani (Titular See) and Apostolic Administrator for what is now the Roman Catholic Diocese of Port Harcourt and for what later became the Diocese of Warri He was consecrated as a bishop on 12 July of the same year. The principal consecrator was Cardinal Agnelo Rossi; his principal co-consecrators were Cardinal Bernardin Gantin, and Bishop James Moynagh.

In 1983, Fitzgibbon appointed Father Joseph Brookman-Amissah as the part-time chaplain of the Chapel of the Annunciation at the University of Port Harcourt at its temporary location. Fitzgibbon made his first pastoral visit to the university 3 June 1984. On 17 July 1988 and his second visit, he requested a permanent location for the chapel.

On 31 August 1991, Fitzgibbon was appointed as Bishop of the Diocese of Warri. He retired in 2005. Dr. Fitzgibbon died on 17 April 2010 and is buried in the graveyard in the headquarters of St. Patrick's Missionary Fathers, Kiltegan, Ireland.

== See also ==
- Bishop of Port Harcourt
