= Peter Nworie Chukwu =

Nigerian Roman Catholic prelate (1965–2026)

The Most Reverend Peter Nworie Chukwu
- Bishop of Abakaliki
- Church: Roman Catholic
- Archdiocese: Onitsha
- Diocese: Abakaliki
- Installed: 6 July 2021
- Term ended: 10 April 2026
- Predecessor: Michael Nnachi Okoro
- Successor: Vacant

Orders
- Ordination: 3 July 1993
- Consecration: 19 August 2021 by Antonio Guido Filipazzi, Valerian Okeke and Augustine Obiora Akubeze

Personal details
- Born: Peter Nworie Chukwu; 5 November 1965 Ededeagu Umuezekohohu, Ebonyi State, Nigeria
- Died: 10 April 2026 (aged 60)
- Education: Franciscan University of Steubenville, Marquette University
- Motto: Totus tuus ego sum
- Coat of arms

Styles of Peter Nworie Chukwu
- Reference style: His Excellency; The Most Reverend
- Spoken style: Your Excellency
- Religious style: Bishop

Peter Nworie Chukwu (5 November 1965 – 10 April 2026) was a Nigerian Roman Catholic prelate, who served as the Bishop of the Diocese of Abakaliki from 2021 until his death in 2026.

== Early life and education ==
Peter Nworie Chukwu was born on 5 November 1965 in Ededeagu Umuezeokoha, Ebonyi State. He began his priestly formation at the Seat of Wisdom Seminary in Owerri, completing his philosophical studies in 1989. He then moved to the Bigard Memorial Major Seminary in Enugu for his theological studies, which he completed in 1993.

Chukwu pursued his postgraduate education in the United States, studying at the Franciscan University of Steubenville from 2000 to 2001 and subsequently earning a doctorate in philosophy from Marquette University (2002–2007).

== Priestly ministry ==
Chukwu was ordained a priest for the Diocese of Abakaliki on 3 July 1993. His early pastoral assignments included serving as the Parochial Vicar at St. John the Evangelist Parish in Okpaugwu from 1993 to 1994, followed by a tenure as the Vice-Rector of the St. Augustine Minor Seminary until 1996. He later served as the Parish Priest of St. Patrick's Parish in Nduroke between 1997 and 2000.

During 2000–2010 he served in the United States, in the Diocese of Grand Rapids. Upon returning to Nigeria, Chukwu balanced pastoral duties with academic responsibilities, serving as a professor at Ebonyi State University from 2011 to 2021. Additionally, he provided spiritual guidance as the Spiritual Director of the Novitiate of the Sisters of Jesus the Good Shepherd.

== Episcopal career ==
On 6 July 2021, Pope Francis appointed Chukwu as the Bishop of Abakaliki, succeeding Bishop Michael Nnachi Okoro, who had reached the retirement age. He was consecrated on 19 August 2021 by Archbishop Antonio Guido Filipazzi, the Apostolic Nuncio to Nigeria. During his tenure, Chukwu was recognized for his academic contributions and his focus on the spiritual growth of the laity and clergy in Ebonyi State.

== Death ==
Chukwu died on 10 April 2026, at the age of 60. His death was officially announced by the Chancery of the Catholic Diocese of Abakaliki, which stated that he had died following a brief illness.

Catholic Church titles
| Preceded by Michael Nnachi Okoro | Bishop of Abakaliki; 2021–2026 | Succeeded by Vacant |
