= Diocese of Abakaliki =

Roman Catholic diocese in Nigeria

Coordinates: 6.3480°N 8.0798°E

Diocese of Abakaliki Dioecesis Abakalikiensis

Location
- Country: Nigeria
- Ecclesiastical province: Roman Catholic Archdiocese of Onitsha
- Metropolitan: Archbishop of Onitsha

Statistics
- Area: 6,342 km^{2} (2,449 sq mi)
- Population: Total; Catholics: (as of 2022); 2,470,250; 664,200 (26.9%)
- Parishes: 179

Information
- Denomination: Roman Catholic
- Rite: Latin Rite
- Cathedral: St. Theresa Cathedral in Abakaliki
- Secular priests: 201

Current leadership
- Pope: Leo XIV
- Bishop: Vacant
- Apostolic Administrator: Ernest Anaezichukwu Obodo
- Bishops emeritus: Michael Nnachi Okoro

Website
- www.AbakalikiDiocese.org

The Diocese of Abakaliki is a Roman Catholic diocese with its headquarters in Abakaliki, Nigeria. It was erected on 1 March 1973 from the territory of the Diocese of Ogoja with the Right Reverend Thomas McGettrick SPS as its first bishop.

There is also a Bishop and Diocese of Abakaliki in the Anglican Church of Nigeria.

== Bishops ==
=== Ordinaries ===
- Thomas McGettrick, S.P.S. (1973–1983)
- Michael Nnachi Okoro (1983–2021)
- Peter Nworie Chukwu (2021–2026)

=== Auxiliary Bishop ===
- Michael Nnachi Okoro (1977–1983), appointed Bishop here
