= Edmund FitzGibbon (disambiguation) =

Edmund FitzGibbon was an Irish nobleman.

Edmund FitzGibbon may also refer to:

- Edmund Fitzgibbon (bishop)
- Edmund Gerald FitzGibbon, barrister and town clerk of Melbourne
