= Diocese of Ikot Ekpene =

Roman Catholic diocese in Akwa Ibom State, Nigeria

Diocese of Ikot Ekpene Dioecesis Ikotekpenensis

Location
- Country: Nigeria
- Territory: a portion of Akwa Ibom State
- Ecclesiastical province: Calabar
- Metropolitan: Calabar
- Coordinates: 5°11′0″N 7°43′0″E

Statistics
- Area: 2,263 km^{2} (874 sq mi)
- Population: Total; Catholics: (as of 2022); 1,172,082; 60,150 (5.1%)
- Parishes: 53

Information
- Denomination: Catholic Church
- Sui iuris church: Latin Church
- Rite: Roman Rite
- Established: March 1, 1963
- Cathedral: Saint Anne Cathedral in Ikot Ekpene
- Co-cathedral: Saint John Pro-Cathedral in Abak
- Secular priests: 210

Current leadership
- Pope: Leo XIV
- Bishop: Camillus Raymond Umoh
- Bishops emeritus: Most Rev. Camillus Archibong Etokudoh

Map
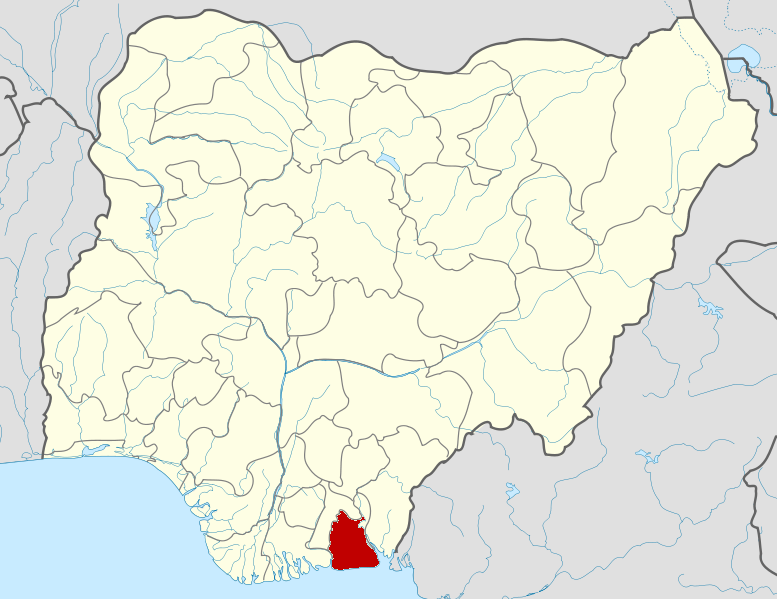
- Ikot Ekpene is located in Akwa Ibom State shown here in red.

The Diocese of Ikot Ekpene (Latin: Ikotekpenen(sis)) is a Latin Church ecclesiastical territory or diocese of the Catholic Church. Its episcopal see is Ikot Ekpene, Akwa Ibom State. The Diocese of Ikot Ekpene is a suffragan diocese in the ecclesiastical province of the metropolitan Archdiocese of Calabar.

== History ==
- March 1, 1963: Established as Diocese of Ikot Ekpene from the Diocese of Calabar

== Special churches ==
The diocesan cathedral is Saint Anne Cathedral in Ikot Ekpene. The pro-cathedral is Saint John Pro-Cathedral in Abak.

== Bishops ==
- Bishops of Ikot Ekpene
  - Bishop Dominic Ignatius Ekandem (1963.03.01 – 1989.06.19) (Cardinal in 1976), appointed Ecclesiastical Superior of Abuja in 1981 and Archbishop (personal title) there in 1989
  - Bishop Camillus Archibong Etokudoh (from 1989.09.01 until May 4, 2009)
  - Bishop Camillus Raymond Umoh (since 2010.10.09); born in 1956 in Nto Ubiam, ordained to the priesthood in 1984, formerly a Professor at the Catholic Institute of West Africa in Port Harcourt

=== Auxiliary Bishop ===
- Camillus Archibong Etokudoh (1988-1989), appointed Bishop of Ikot Ekpene

=== Other priest of this diocese who became bishop ===
- Donatus Edet Akpan, appointed Bishop of Ogoja in 2017

== Deaneries ==
- Abak
- Ifuho
- Ika
- Inen
- Nto Edino
- Ukana
- Urua Akpan

== See also ==
- Roman Catholicism in Nigeria
