= Joseph Edra Ukpo =

Nigerian Catholic priest (1937–2023)

His Excellency Joseph Edra Ukpo
- Archbishop Emeritus of Calabar
- Appointed: 17 December 2003
- Term ended: 2 February 2013
- Predecessor: Brian David Usanga
- Successor: Joseph Effiong Ekuwem
- Previous posts: Auxiliary Bishop of Ogoja and Titular Bishop of Chullu (1971–1973); Bishop of Ogoja (1973–2003)

Orders
- Ordination: 25 April 1965
- Consecration: 19 September 1971 by Thomas McGettrick

Personal details
- Born: 6 June 1937 Okpoma, British Nigeria
- Died: 1 March 2023 (aged 85)

Joseph Edra Ukpo (6 June 1937 – 1 March 2023) was a Nigerian Catholic prelate who was the archbishop of the Archdiocese of Calabar from his appointment in 2003, succeeding Brian David Usanga, until his retirement in 2013.

Ukpo was born at Okpoma in the Cross River State. He was the brother of Nigerian military Brigadier General (Retired) Anthony Ukpo. Ukpo died on 1 March 2023, at the age of 85. He died from a brief illness in Calabar after serving as a priest for over 50 years. He was ordained a priest of the Catholic Diocese of Ogoja on 25th April 1965.

He was later appointed as the Auxiliary Bishop of the Diocese on 24 April 1971 and on 1 March 1973, he was appointed as the substantive Bishop of the Diocese before becoming the Archbishop of the Catholic Archdiocese of Calabar on 17 December 2003.

Catholic Church titles
Preceded by Brian David Usanga	Archbishop of Calabar; 2003–2013	Succeeded by Joseph Effiong Ekuwem
Preceded by Thomas McGettrick	Bishop of Ogoja; 1973–2003	Succeeded by John Ebebe Ayah
Preceded by —	Auxiliary Bishop of Ogoja; 1971–1973	Succeeded by —
Preceded by Marc Lacroix	Titular Bishop of Chullu; 1971–1973	Succeeded by Franco Mulakkal
