= Ibom Hotels and Golf Resort =

Hotel and golf resort in Nigeria

Ibom Hotel and Golf Resort (formerly Le Meridien Ibom Hotel and Golf Resort and Ibom ICON Hotel & Golf Resort) is a luxury five star hotel and golf resort in Uyo, Akwa Ibom established in 2007 by the Government of Akwa Ibom State under the governorship of Victor Attah.

== History and location ==
Ibom Hotel and Golf Resort was built in 2007 by the Akwa Ibom State government during the administration of Governor Victor Attah. It is located at Nwaniba, a coastal community in Uyo, which palm vegetations and offers a view of the mountains in Cameroon.

Icon Hotel Group Africa took over management of the hotel in 2020.

== Features ==
The hotel features a 163 rooms, 26 suites, 7 villas and an 18-hole par 72, 6361 metre golf course. Other features include a health centre with fitness room, sauna, hammam and Jacuzzi, an outdoor swimming pool, with a tennis and squash courts. It also houses a heliport with two helipads.
