= Dakkada Towers =

Building in Uyo, Nigeria

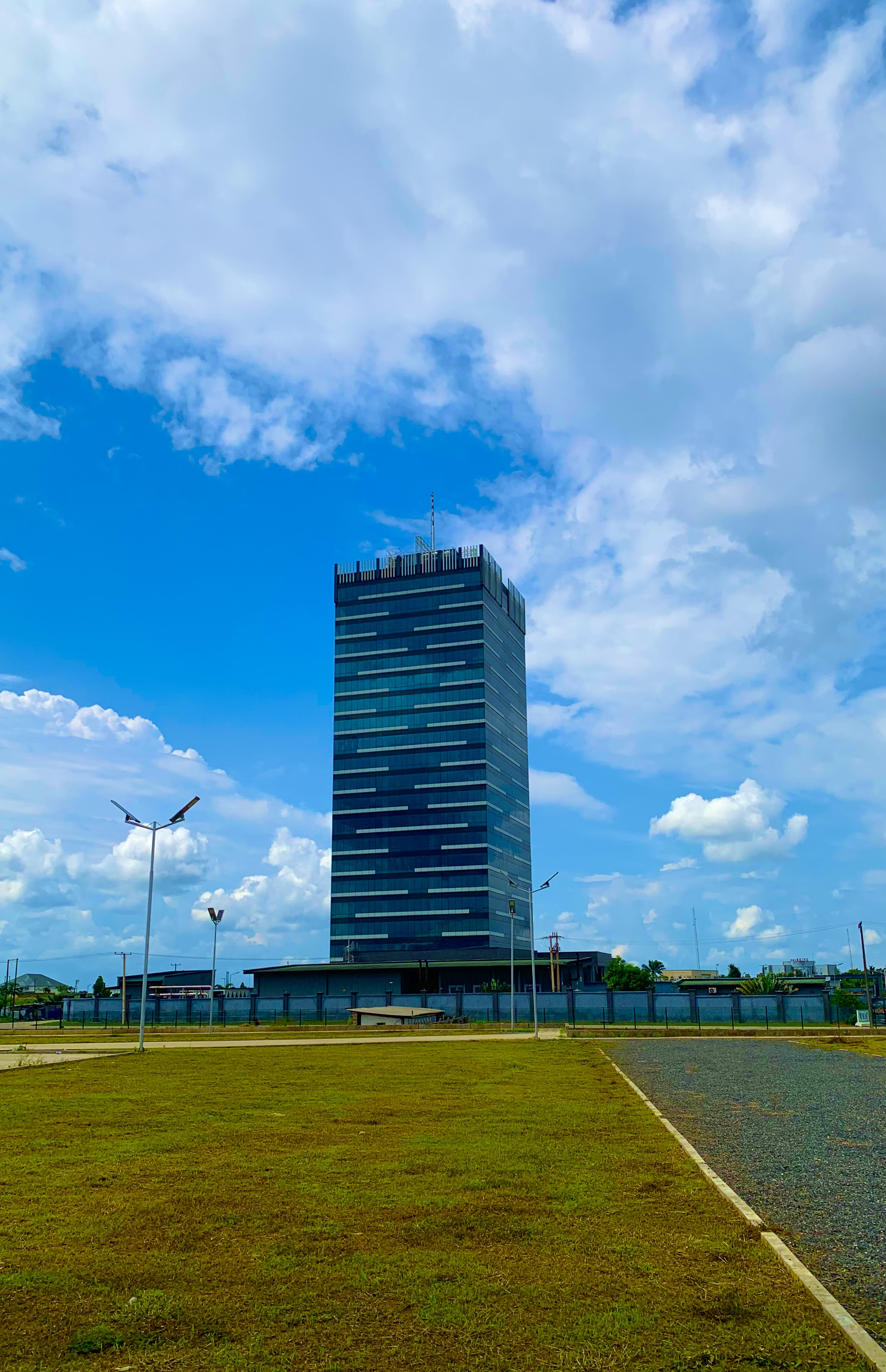
Dakkada Towers

Dakkada Towers is a 21-storey building located in Banking Layout, Udo Udoma Avenue in Uyo, Akwa Ibom State.

The building was constructed by VKC Construction Limited and commissioned by Professor Yemi Osinbanjo in 2021.
