= Ibom Specialist Hospital =

Hospital in Uyo, Akwa Ibom, Nigeria

Ibom Multi-Specialty Hospital (Ibom Specialist Hospital)
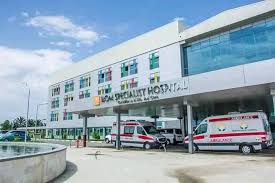

Geography
- Location: Uyo, Akwa Ibom State, Nigeria

Organisation
- Type: Specialist

Services
- Standards: World Class
- Beds: 302

Helipads
- Helipad: Yes

History
- Founded: 2015

Links
- Website: www.ibommultispecialtyhospital.org
- Lists: Hospitals in Nigeria

Ibom Multi-Specialty Hospital (Ibom Specialist Hospital) is situated in Ekit Itam II along Uyo-Ikot Ekpene Road, Akwa Ibom State. It is popularly referred to as "ISH".

== History ==
Planning for the Akwa Ibom Specialist Hospital started in early 2010, under the German Designer RRP in Munich. Construction began in 2010. The Hospital contains all relevant disciplines, including a special clinic for children. It has about 300 beds, divided between a male and female ward wings. The Hospital was planned as a State of the Art Hospital, unique in Akwa Ibom State as well as the whole of Nigeria. Ibom Specialist Hospital (ISH) was established by Senator Godswill Akpabio during his tenure as Akwa Ibom State Governor. In 2015, the hospital was officially launched and operations began 6 months later. The hospital is operated by medical professionals paid by the state government to train and also carry out medical operations. The hospital began operations with 150 expatriates mostly made up of Indians.

On 18 April 2018, the hospital recorded its first neurosurgery.
