= Christian Secondary Commercial School =

Government school in Uyo, Nigeria

- Uyo, Akwa Ibom State; Nigeria

Information
- Type: Government Secondary School

Christian Secondary Commercial School is a government secondary school in the city of Uyo, Akwa Ibom State of Nigeria.
