= Godfrey Okoye =

The Most Reverend Godfrey Okoye C.S.Sp.
- Bishop of Port Harcourt
- Church: Roman Catholic
- Appointed: 16 May 1961
- In office: 1961–1970
- Predecessor: none
- Successor: Dominic Ignatius Ekandem

Orders
- Ordination: 27 July 1947 by Charles Heerey
- Consecration: 3 September 1961 by Pope John XXIII
- Rank: Bishop

Personal details
- Born: 19 December 1913 Ifitedunu, Eastern Region, Nigeria
- Died: 17 March 1977 (aged 63)

Godfrey Mary Paul Okoye, C.S.Sp. // (19 December 1913 – 17 March 1977) was a bishop of the Roman Catholic Church in Nigeria. He was the first Bishop of Port Harcourt, serving from 3 September 1961 to 7 March 1970. After leaving the diocese of Port Harcourt, he became the second Bishop of Enugu, succeeding Bishop John Cross Anyogu.

== Biography ==
Okoye was born on 19 December 1913 to Okoye Nwazulu and Ada Oji in Ifitedunu in the Eastern Region of Nigeria, now Anambra State. He was ordained to priesthood by Most Rev. Dr. Charles Heerey, the Archbishop of Onitsha, on 27 July 1947. In 1950 he became only the second Igbo priest to be admitted into the Congregation of the Holy Spirit. Okoye was heavily involved in events around the Nigerian Civil War, and his explicit support for Biafra raised concerns among fellow priests that they would be targeted in Nigeria. Historian Adrian Hastings described Okoye as a "devout Biafran hawk". In 1977, just before having a hernia operation, Okoye destroyed his personal files detailing his involvement in the war. He died shortly after the operation.
