= Ann-Kio Briggs =

English-born Nigerian activist

- Born: 29 July 1952 (age 73); England
- Occupations: Environmental and human rights activist
- Years active: 1998–present
- Known for: Activism
- Notable work: She is the founder and director of the non-governmental organization Agape Birthrights
- Children: 4

Ann-Kio Briggs, alternatively spelled Annkio Briggs, (born 29 July 1952 in England) is an English-born Nigerian environmentalist and human rights activist. She is the founder and director of the non-governmental organization Agape Birthrights. As of 2011, she was spokesperson of the Ijaw Republican Assembly (IRA) as well as the United Niger Delta Energy Development Security Strategy (UNDEDSS).

== Early life and education ==
Briggs was born on 29 July 1952 in England. She was born to a British mother and an Ijaw marine engineer. During her early years, she was taken to live with her paternal grandmother, who raised her alongside her father in Abonnema, Rivers State. While in Abonnema, she completed her elementary school and enrolled at Holy Rosary Girls School in Port Harcourt for her secondary education. From (1967 to 1970), her academic studies were impeded by the civil war. After the war ended, Briggs moved with her family to England, where she studied Marketing and got married. She and her husband had four children together and divorced in 1998. Briggs is fluent in Igbo, as well as her native language, Kalabari. She also speaks Pidgin English.

== Career ==
In 1998, after several years in Europe, she returned to the Niger Delta and established Agape Birthrights, a non-governmental and a non-profit organization, having its headquarters in Port Harcourt, Rivers State. Briggs, through her organization, has helped some developing areas to document cleaning of oil spillage and fighting against injustices and marginalisation. She also collaborates internationally with other organizations home and abroad.

== Awards ==
Briggs received the Ijaw heroes award from the Ijaw republic assembly.

== See also ==
- List of people from Rivers State
