= Thomas McGettrick =

Thomas McGettrick SPS
- Bishop of Abakaliki
- Church: Catholic Church
- Diocese: Diocese of Abakaliki
- In office: 1 March 1973 – 19 February 1983
- Predecessor: Diocese erected
- Successor: Michael Nnachi Okoro
- Previous posts: Bishop of Ogoja (1955-1973); Prefect of Ogoja (1938-1955)

Orders
- Ordination: 22 June 1930 by Daniel Mageean
- Consecration: 22 May 1955 by John D'Alton

Personal details
- Born: 22 December 1905 Killavil, Corran, County Sligo, United Kingdom of Great Britain and Ireland
- Died: 17 December 1988 (aged 82)

Thomas McGettrick SPS (born 22 December 1905, Killavil – died 17 December 1988, ), was an Irish born missionary priest, who served as a Bishop in Nigeria.

McGettrick was born on 22 December 1905 at Killavil, Emlegh (Ballymote), Co. Sligo. He was educated at St Nathy's College in Ballaghaderreen, the diocesan college for the diocese of Achonry, he did his philosophical and theological studies at St. Patrick's College, Maynooth and was ordained in Maynooth on 22 June 1930 ordained a priest for Achonry diocese.

He was a founding member of the Saint Patrick's Society for the Foreign Missions, (Kiltegan Fathers), which he entered in 1932, in response to appeals for priests for the missions. Fr. McGettrick volunteered for mission and was sent to Nigeria as, replacing Fr. Patrick Whitney (the societies founder) as Prefect Apostolic of Ogoja in 1939. He was appointed Bishop of Ogoja, Nigeria in 1955 serving until 1973 when the diocese was split and he was appointed the first Bishop of Abakaliki serving until 1983.
