= Archdiocese of Calabar =

Roman Catholic archdiocese in Cross River State, Nigeria

Archdiocese of Calabar Archidioecesis Calabarensis

Location
- Country: Nigeria
- Territory: Portions of Cross River State
- Ecclesiastical province: Calabar
- Deaneries: 10 + 1 extra territorial
- Coordinates: 4°57′00″N 8°19′30″E

Statistics
- Area: 7,754 km^{2} (2,994 sq mi)
- Population: Total; Catholics: (as of 2022); 1,682,110; 306,760 (18.2%)
- Parishes: 64 Parishes/Chaplaincies; 11 Quasi Parishes; 6 Autonomous communities 4 Mass Centres
- Schools: Over 31 Nursery/Primary schools and 17 Secondary schools

Information
- Denomination: Catholic Church
- Sui iuris church: Latin Church
- Rite: Roman Rite
- Established: Diocese: 18 April 1950; Archdiocese: 26 March 1994
- Cathedral: Sacred Heart Cathedral, Calabar
- Co-cathedral: Saint Mary Pro-Cathedral, Calabar
- Secular priests: 107

Current leadership
- Pope: Leo XIV
- Archbishop: Joseph Effiong Ekuwem
- Auxiliary Bishops: Christopher Naseri Naseri

Map
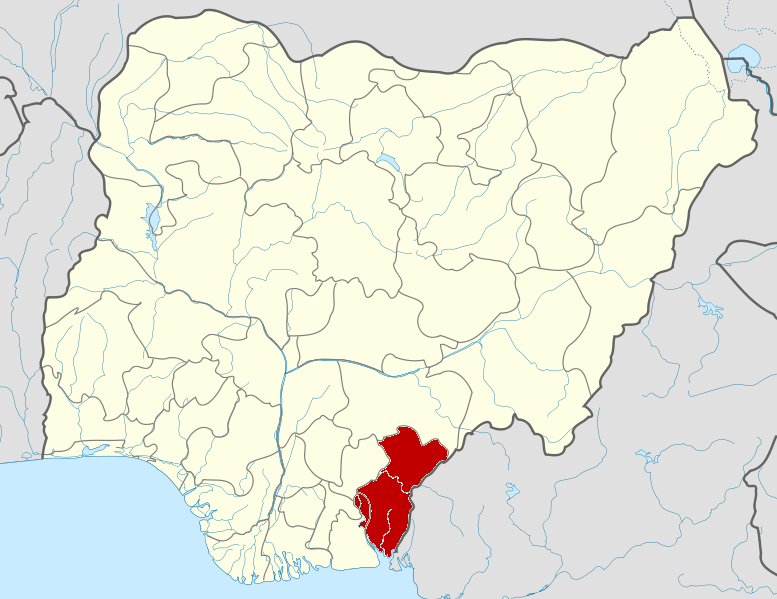
- Calabar shown in red

The Archdiocese of Calabar (Archidioecesis Calabarensis) is a Catholic Latin rite church in Calabar, Cross River State, Nigeria. An archdiocese, the archbishop serves as the metropolitan of the ecclesiastical province with four suffragan dioceses: the Ikot Ekpene, Ogoja, Port Harcourt, and Uyo.

== History ==
- 1934.07.09: Established as Apostolic Prefecture of Calabar from the Apostolic Vicariate of Western Nigeria
- 1947.06.12: Promoted as Apostolic Vicariate of Calabar
- 1950.04.18: Promoted as Diocese of Calabar
- 1994.03.26: Promoted as Metropolitan Archdiocese of Calabar

== Special churches ==
- Cathedral: Sacred Heart Cathedral in Calabar
- Pro-Cathedral: Saint Mary’s Pro-Cathedral in Calabar.

== Bishops ==
- Prefect Apostolic of Calabar
  - Father James Moynagh, S.P.S. 1934.10.26 – 1947.06.12 see below
- Vicar Apostolic of Calabar (Roman rite)
  - Bishop James Moynagh, S.P.S. see above 1947.06.12 – 1950.04.18 see below
- Bishops of Calabar (Roman rite)
  - Bishop James Moynagh, S.P.S. see above 1950.04.18 – 1970.02.05
  - Bishop Brian David Usanga 1970.02.05 – 1994.03.26 see below
- Metropolitan Archbishops of Calabar (Roman rite)
  - Archbishop Brian David Usanga see above 1994.03.26 – 2003.12.17
  - Archbishop Joseph Edra Ukpo 2003.12.17 - 2013.02.02; Archbishop Emeritus; resignation accepted by Pope Benedict XVI
  - Archbishop Joseph Effiong Ekuwem 2013.02.02 - present; formerly, Bishop of the Roman Catholic Diocese of Uyo

=== Auxiliary Bishops ===
- Dominic Ignatius Ekandem (1953-1963), appointed Bishop of Ikot Ekpene (Cardinal in 1976)
- Brian David Usanga (1966-1970), appointed Bishop here
- Christopher Naseri Naseri (2023-present), current Auxiliary Bishop.

== Suffragan dioceses ==
- Diocese of Ikot Ekpene
- Diocese of Ogoja
- Diocese of Port Harcourt
- Diocese of Uyo

== See also ==
- Roman Catholicism in Nigeria
- Roman Catholic churches in Port Harcourt
