= Donatus Edet Akpan =

Roman Catholic Bishop

- Bishop of Ogoja
- Church: Catholic Church
- Diocese: Diocese of Ogoja
- Appointed: 9 April 2017
- Predecessor: John Ebebe Ayah

Orders
- Ordination: 12 October 1985
- Consecration: 9 April 2017 by Joseph Ekuwem

Personal details
- Born: 7 August 1952 (age 73) Ikot Ada Utor (west of Ikot Ekpene), Calabar Province, Colony and Protectorate of Nigeria, British Empire

Donatus Edet Akpan (born 2 August 1952) is a Nigerian Catholic prelate who has served as the bishop of the diocese of Ogoja since 2017.

== Biography ==
Akpan was born in Ikat Ada Utor. He studied at Queen of Angels Minor Seminary before preceding to Bigard Memorial Seminary and St. Joseph Major Seminary, both in Enugu. He was ordained a priest in October 1985. He had his further studies in biblical theology at the University of Nigeria, Nsukka. He was appointed as bishop of Ogoja in April 2017 by Pope Francis, and was consecrated in July.
