= Hierapolis in Isauria =

City and diocese in ancient Isauria

Hierapolis in Isauria was a city and diocese in ancient Isauria, which remains a Latin Catholic titular see. Its modern site seems unclear.

== History ==
The city was important enough in the Roman province of Isauria (in Asia Minor, now Asian Turkey) to become a suffragan of it capital Seleucia in Isauria's Metropolitan Archbishopric, but it was to fade.

=== Titular see ===
The diocese was nominally restored in 1933.

It is vacant since decades, having had only the following incumbents, both of the lowest (episcopal) rank:

- Dominic Ignatius Ekandem (1953.08.07 – 1963.03.01) as Auxiliary Bishop of Calabar (Nigeria) (1953.08.07 – 1963.03.01), later Bishop of Ikot Ekpene (Nigeria) (1963.03.01 – 1989.06.19), Apostolic Administrator of Port Harcourt (Nigeria) (1970 – 1973), President of Catholic Bishops' Conference of Nigeria (1973 – 1979), created Cardinal-Priest of S. Marcello (1976.05.24 – death 1995.11.24), President of Association of the Episcopal Conferences of Anglophone West Africa (1978 – 1983), Ecclesiastical Superior of Abuja (Nigeria) (1981.11.06 – 1989.06.19), Archbishop-Bishop of Abuja (Nigeria) (1989.06.19 – retired 1992.09.28)
- José Alberto Lopes de Castro Pinto (1964.02.25 – 1976.01.16) as Auxiliary Bishop of São Sebastião do Rio de Janeiro (Brazil) (1964.02.25 – 1976.01.16), later Bishop of Guaxupé (Brazil) (1976.01.16 – 1989.09.14)

== Source and external links ==
- GCatholic with titular incumbent biography links
