= Christopher Naseri Naseri =

Nigerian Catholic prelate

Christopher Naseri Naseri (born 5 April 1970) is a Nigerian Catholic prelate who has served as the auxiliary bishop of the archdiocese of Calabar since 1 May 2023 when he was appointed by Pope Francis.
