= James Moynagh =

Irish-born Roman Catholic bishop

James Moynagh S.P.S.
- Bishop of Calabar
- Church: Catholic Church
- Diocese: Diocese of Calabar
- In office: 18 April 1950 – 5 February 1970
- Predecessor: Prefecture erected
- Successor: Brian David Usanga
- Other post: Titular Bishop of Mageó (1970)
- Previous posts: Vicar Apostolic of Calabar (1947-1950); Titular Bishop of Lambaesis (1947-1950); Prefect of Calabar (1934-1947)

Orders
- Ordination: 22 June 1930 by Daniel Mageean
- Consecration: 7 September 1947 by John D'Alton

Personal details
- Born: 25 April 1903 Loughduff, County Cavan, Ireland
- Died: 11 June 1985 (aged 82) Kiltegan, County Wicklow, Ireland

Bishop James Moynagh S.P.S. (25 April 1903 – 11 June 1985), was an Irish Roman Catholic priest who served for the Saint Patrick’s Society for the Foreign Missions in Nigeria, and was ordained Bishop of Calabar.

== Life ==
He was born on 25 April 1903 to Patrick Moynagh and Margaret Moynagh (née Smith), of Legwee, Loughduff, Ballinagh, Mullahoran, County Cavan, and educated at St. Mel's College, Longford. He studied for the priesthood in Maynooth College, where he was ordained in 1930 for the Diocese of Ardagh and Clonmacnoise, but volunteered to serve in Nigeria. He founded St. Patrick's College, Ikot Ansa, in 1934 to cater for the Catholic converts graduating from primary school.

Moynagh was ordained a bishop in 1947, in Maynooth, and appointed Vicar Apostolic of Calabar, Nigeria, becoming the first resident Bishop of Calabar in 1950.

Bishop Moynagh was instrumental in the foundation of the Medical Missionaries of Mary (his sister Sr. Mary Joseph Moynagh was an early member of the congregation, and served as its fourth superior) and that of the Handmaids of the Holy Child Jesus.

Moynagh resigned as bishop in 1970 due to the civil war in Nigeria (all foreign-born missionaries were excluded from Nigeria) and following his return from there, he was appointed parish priest of Annaduff, County Leitrim.

He spent his final years at Kiltegan, with the St. Patrick's Missionary Society, and died on 11 June 1985.

The Bishop James Moynagh Pastoral Centre in the Roman Catholic Diocese of Uyo in Nigeria, is named in his honour.
