= Uyo =

Capital city of Akwa Ibom, Nigeria

- City and LGA
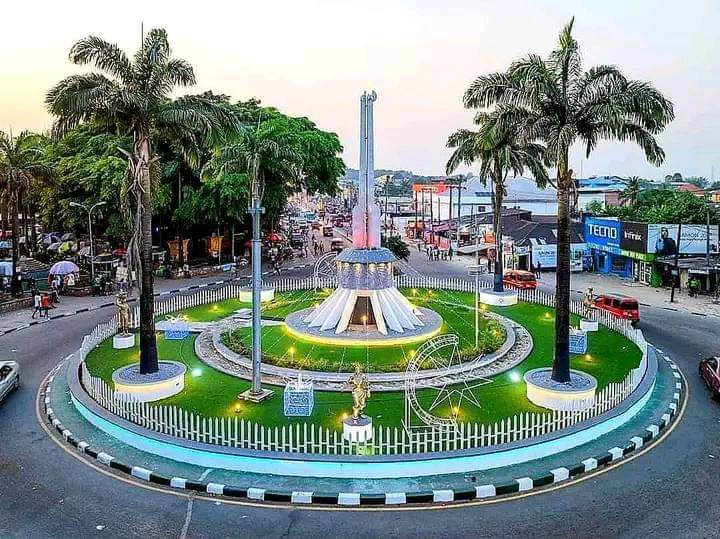
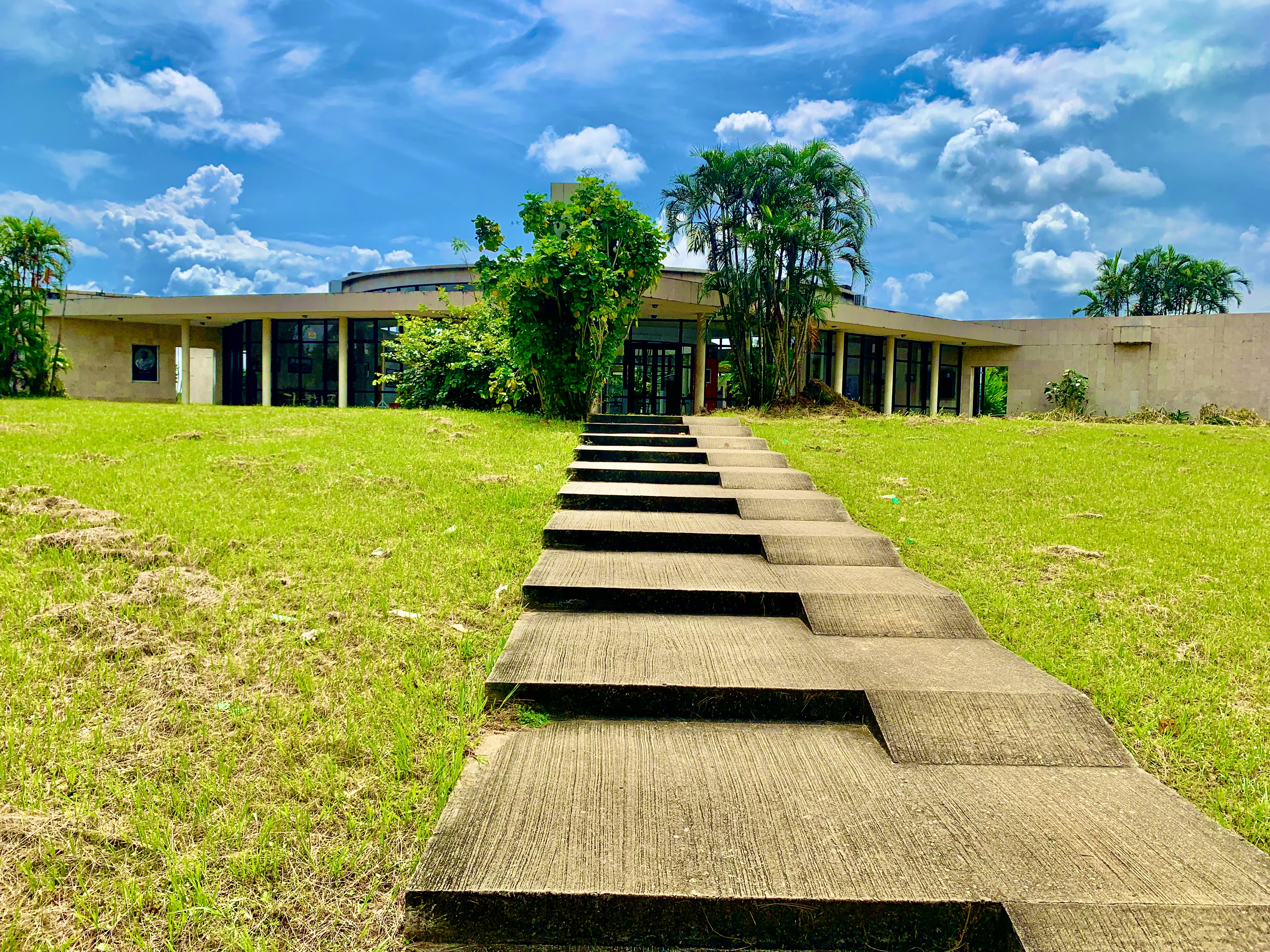
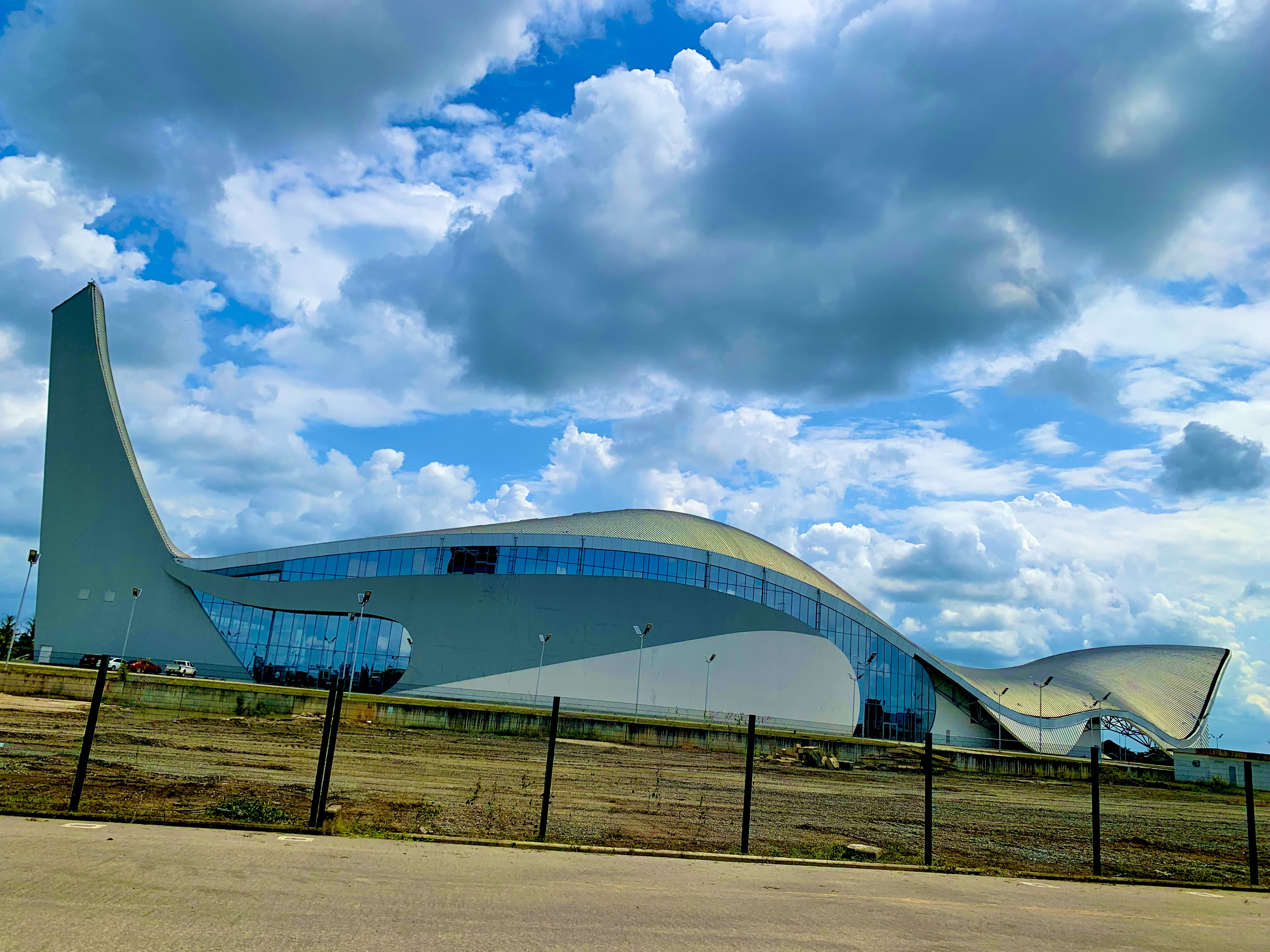
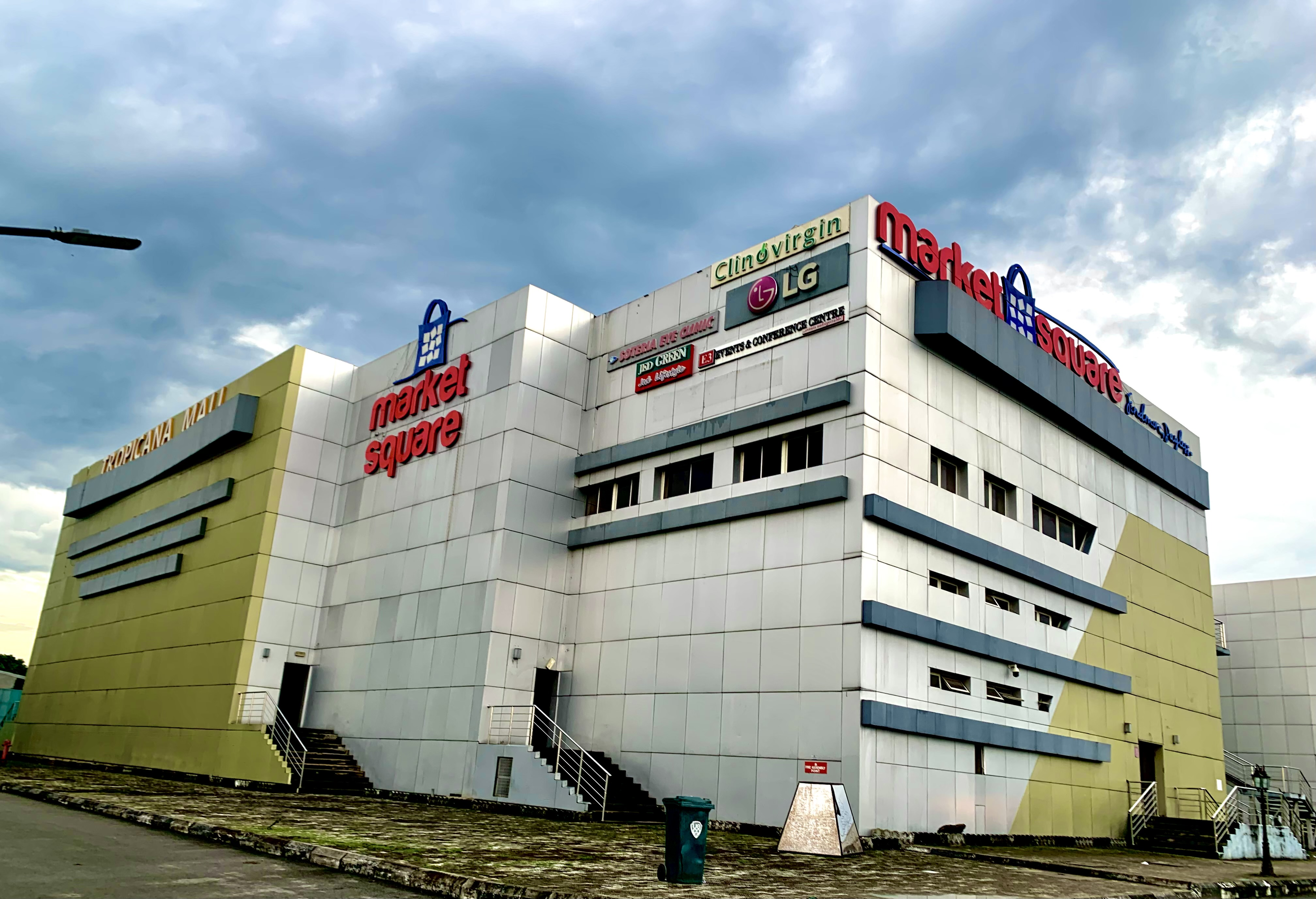
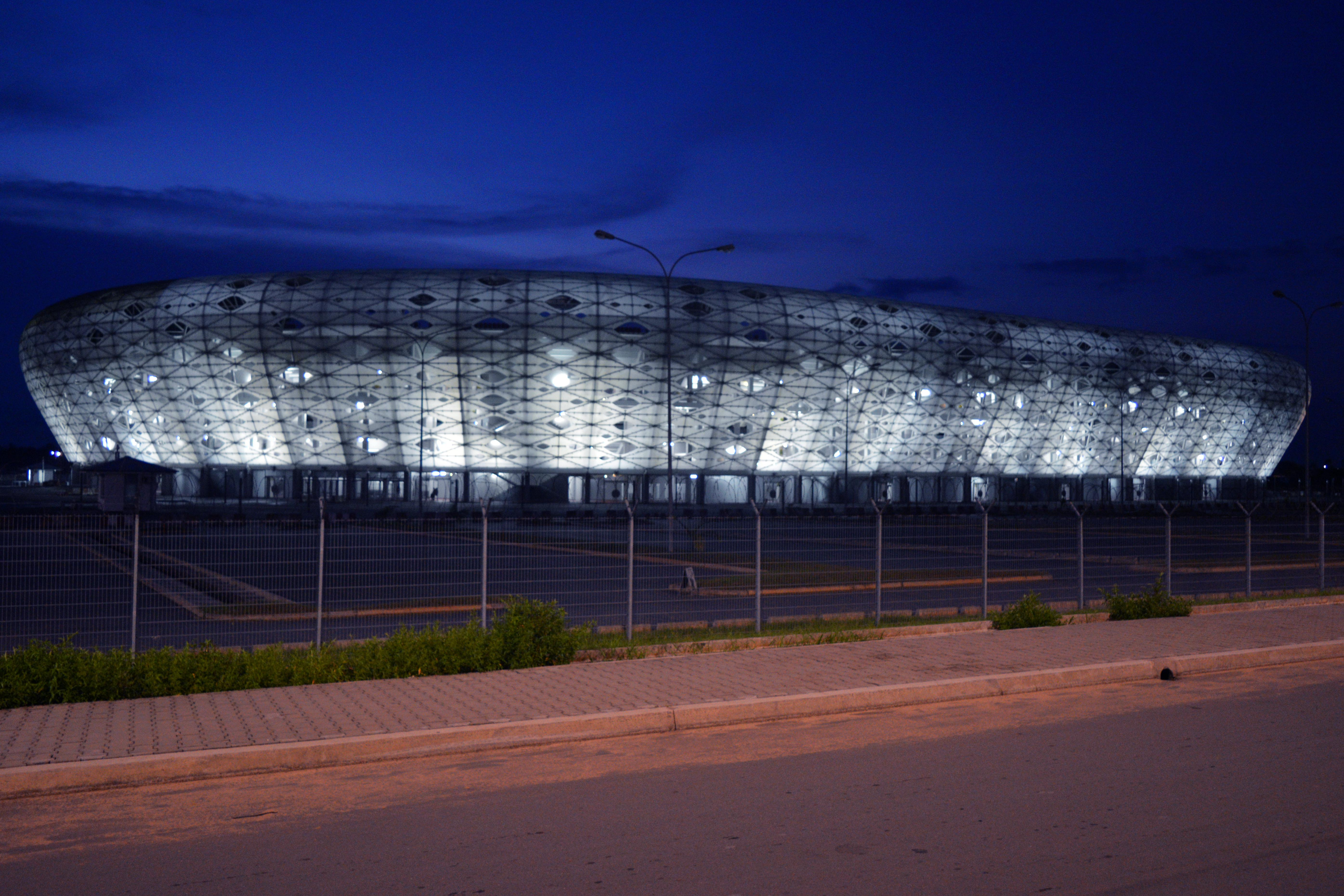
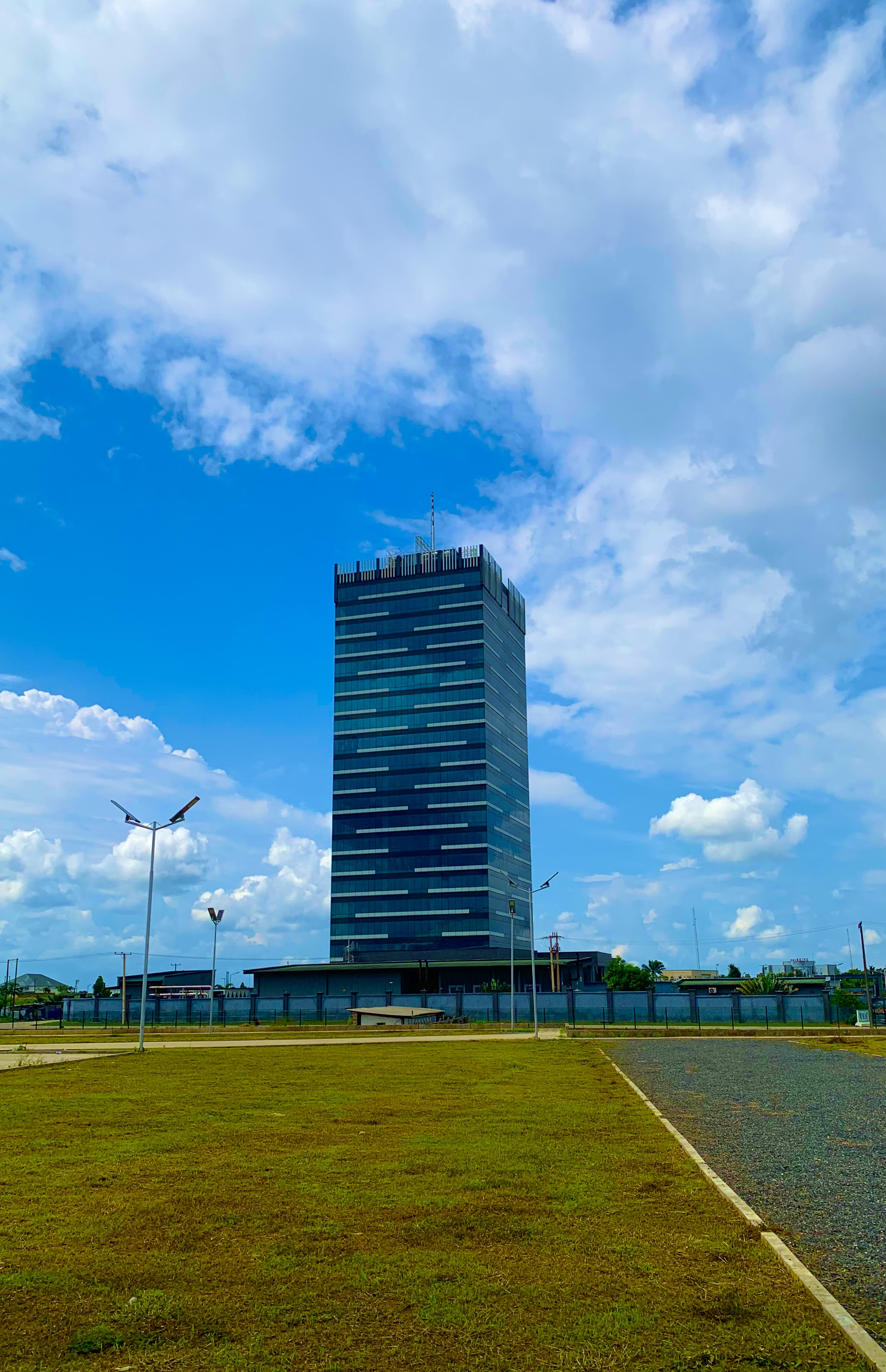
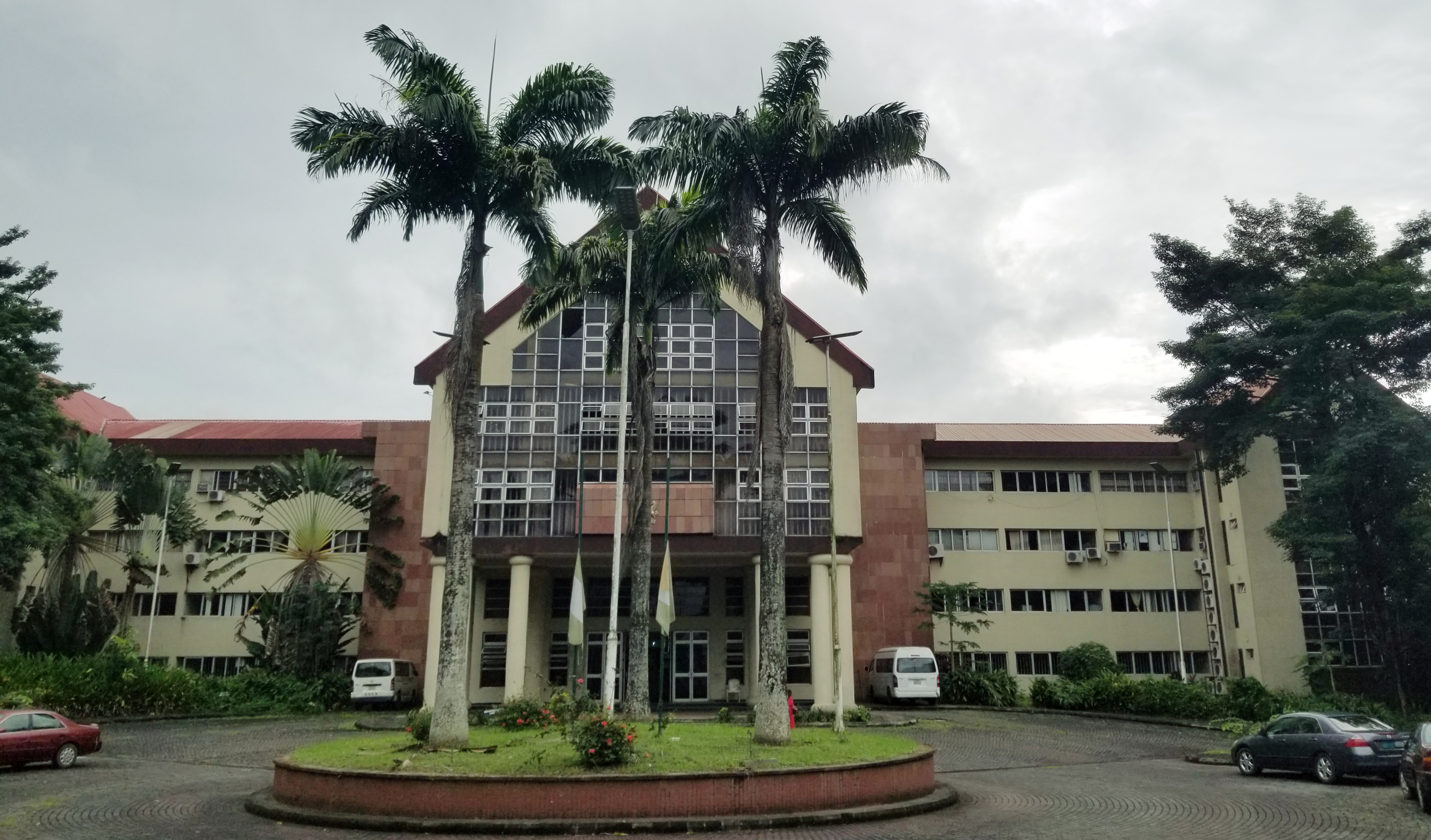
- Ibom plaza roundabout Ibibio Museum International Christian Worship Centre Tropicana Mall Godswill Akpabio International Stadium Dakkada Towers Akwa Ibom State Secretariat
- Motto: Land of Promise
- Interactive map of Uyo
- Location within Nigeria
- Coordinates: 5°02′00″N 7°55′39″E
- Country: Nigeria
- State: Akwa Ibom
- LGAs: Itu; Uyo; Uruan

Government
  - Type: State Capital
  - Chair: Dr Uwemedimo Udo

Area
  - City and LGA: 362 km^{2} (140 sq mi)

Population (2006 census)
  - City and LGA: 427,873
  - Density: 1,180/km^{2} (3,060/sq mi)
  - Urban: 554,906

GDP (PPP, 2015 int. Dollar)
  - Year: 2023
  - Total: $12.4 billion
  - Per capita: $9,300
- Time zone: UTC+1 (WAT)
- Postal code: 520001
- Area code: 085
- Vehicle registration: UYY
- Climate: Am
- Website: http://akwaibomstate.gov.ng

Uyo (audio) is the capital of Akwa Ibom state located in South South, Nigeria. It became the capital on September 23, 1987 when Akwa Ibom was created from the former Cross River State. According to the 2006 Nigerian Census, the population of Uyo (including Itu) is 427,873, while the greater urban area, including Uruan, has a population of 554,906. The population of Uyo is put at 1,393,000 as at 2024.

Ibibio is the primary indigenous language. The main campus of the University of Uyo is in Nwaniba, with satellites on Ikpa Road. Ibom Air has its head office in Uyo.

Uyo is set to host the global knowledge festival, as the first global knowledge centre in Africa opens.

== Education ==
The state government runs free and compulsory education projects with the goal of raising the literacy rate.

Educational institutions include

- Christian Secondary Commercial School
- University of Uyo

There are also many public schools in Uyo, 244 primary schools, 7 secondary schools, 6 special education centres and 5 tertiary institutions.

== Infrastructure ==
=== Transportation ===
- Railway stations in Nigeria

==== Airport ====
Victor Attah International Airport serves Uyo, the capital city of Akwa Ibom.

=== Waste management ===
Due to Uyo's rapid urbanization and population growth, waste management in Uyo has faced significant challenges in the twenty-first century. A 2024 study published in Scientific Reports concluded that the majority of Uyo residents engage in unsustainable waste disposal practices, including open dumping and burning of household waste. The research identified that public awareness of proper waste management is limited, with the majority of respondents unaware of the implications of improper waste disposal. Additionally, while some residents rely on private waste collectors, many areas lack access to regular waste collection services, contributing to the accumulation of waste in unauthorized landfills across the city.

Efforts by the Akwa Ibom State government to address these issues have included the engagement of registered private waste contractors and periodic sanitation exercises, but enforcement remains inconsistent. The study further emphasized that infrastructural deficits – such as the shortage of waste bins and inadequate transportation for collected waste – exacerbate the problem. To improve waste management in Uyo, the researchers recommended increased public education, investment in waste collection infrastructure, and stronger policy enforcement to prevent the continued environmental and health risks posed by the current state of waste disposal in the city.

== Sports ==
- Godswill Akpabio International Stadium

== Religion ==
- Roman Catholic Diocese of Uyo
- Uyo church collapse

== Climate ==
With warm, cloudy wet seasons and hot, largely cloudy dry seasons, Uyo has a year-round oppressive environment with temperatures ranging from 21 °C (70 °F) to 31 °C (88 °F). Humidity ranges from 67 to 88%.

Climate data for Uyo (1991–2020)
Month	Jan	Feb	Mar	Apr	May	Jun	Jul	Aug	Sep	Oct	Nov	Dec	Year
Record high °C (°F)	38.1 (100.6)	39.5 (103.1)	38.5 (101.3)	36.7 (98.1)	36 (97)	34.7 (94.5)	35.3 (95.5)	33.6 (92.5)	39 (102)	38 (100)	36 (97)	36.3 (97.3)	39.5 (103.1)
Mean daily maximum °C (°F)	33.3 (91.9)	34.6 (94.3)	33.5 (92.3)	32.7 (90.9)	31.9 (89.4)	30.4 (86.7)	29.1 (84.4)	28.8 (83.8)	29.6 (85.3)	30.6 (87.1)	31.7 (89.1)	32.6 (90.7)	31.6 (88.9)
Daily mean °C (°F)	27.7 (81.9)	29.2 (84.6)	28.8 (83.8)	28.3 (82.9)	27.8 (82.0)	26.8 (80.2)	26.0 (78.8)	25.8 (78.4)	26.3 (79.3)	26.8 (80.2)	27.5 (81.5)	27.6 (81.7)	27.4 (81.3)
Mean daily minimum °C (°F)	22.2 (72.0)	23.8 (74.8)	24.2 (75.6)	24.0 (75.2)	23.8 (74.8)	23.3 (73.9)	22.9 (73.2)	22.9 (73.2)	23.0 (73.4)	23.1 (73.6)	23.3 (73.9)	22.6 (72.7)	23.3 (73.9)
Record low °C (°F)	15 (59)	18 (64)	20 (68)	20.5 (68.9)	20 (68)	19 (66)	19.5 (67.1)	19 (66)	19 (66)	20 (68)	20 (68)	15 (59)	15.0 (59.0)
Average precipitation mm (inches)	15.2 (0.60)	47.1 (1.85)	124.5 (4.90)	193.6 (7.62)	279.1 (10.99)	303.8 (11.96)	395.2 (15.56)	327.6 (12.90)	318.9 (12.56)	292.2 (11.50)	127.4 (5.02)	11.2 (0.44)	2,435.8 (95.90)
Average precipitation days (≥ 1.0 mm)	1.4	2.9	8.7	11.5	14.7	16.5	20.3	20.0	19.1	16.2	8.5	1.1	140.8
Average relative humidity (%)	77.9	80.8	86.2	88.1	89.2	90.6	90.9	90.8	91.2	90.8	87.8	80.3	87.1
Source: NOAA

=== Cloud ===
Around November 25 marks the start of Uyo's clearer season, which lasts for 2.6 months and ends around February 14. December is the least cloudy month.

Beginning about February 14 and lasting for 9.4 months, the cloudier period of the year ends around November 25. April is the most cloudy month.

=== Wind ===
August is the windiest month, with an average wind speed of 10.3 km/h (6.4 mph; 9.4 ft/s). The windier season lasts 4.4 months. The more tranquil period lasts 7.6 months, with December having the lowest average speed of 6.4 km/h (4.0 mph; 5.8 ft/s).

=== Floods ===
Due to its close proximity to the equator, Uyo (and Akwa Ibom in general) is more likely to get floods than anywhere else in Nigeria. On 9 July 2026, most of Uyo (especially Abak Road) were under intense flooding, with the flood disrupting classes at the University of Uyo.

== Gallery ==
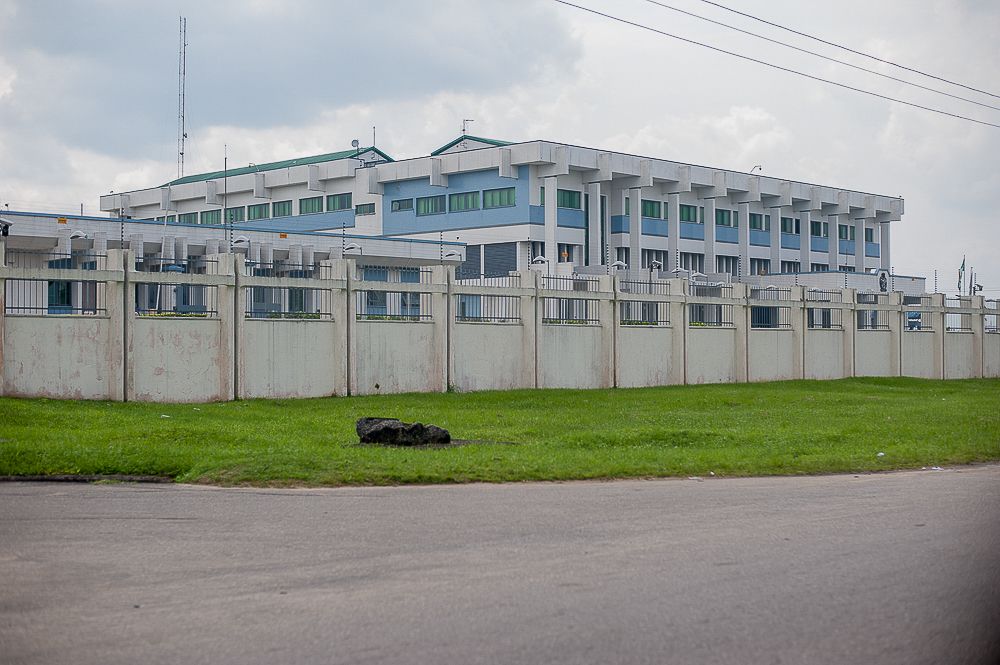

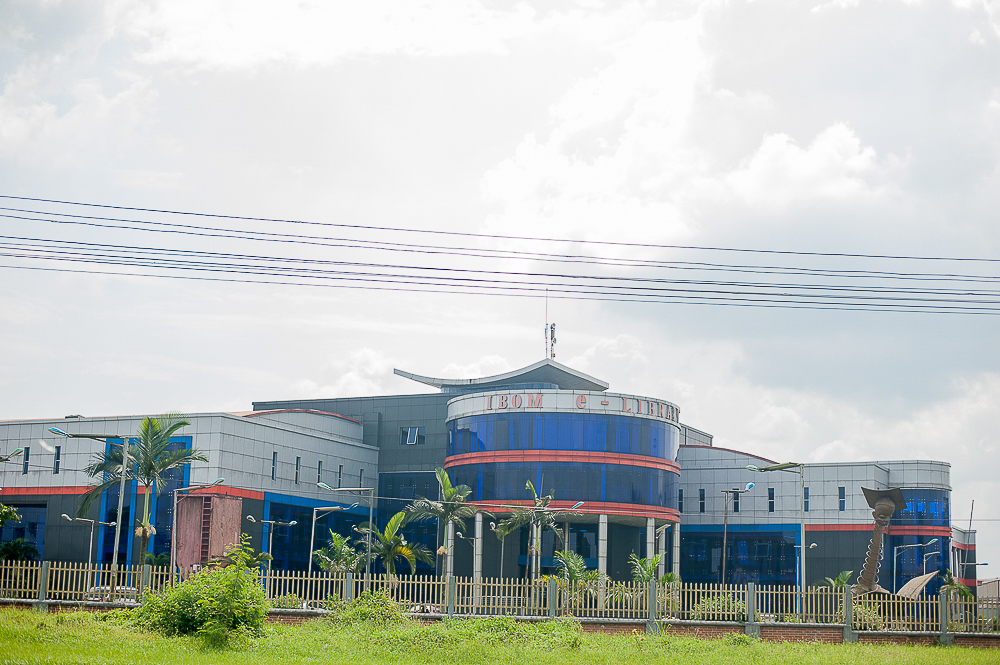

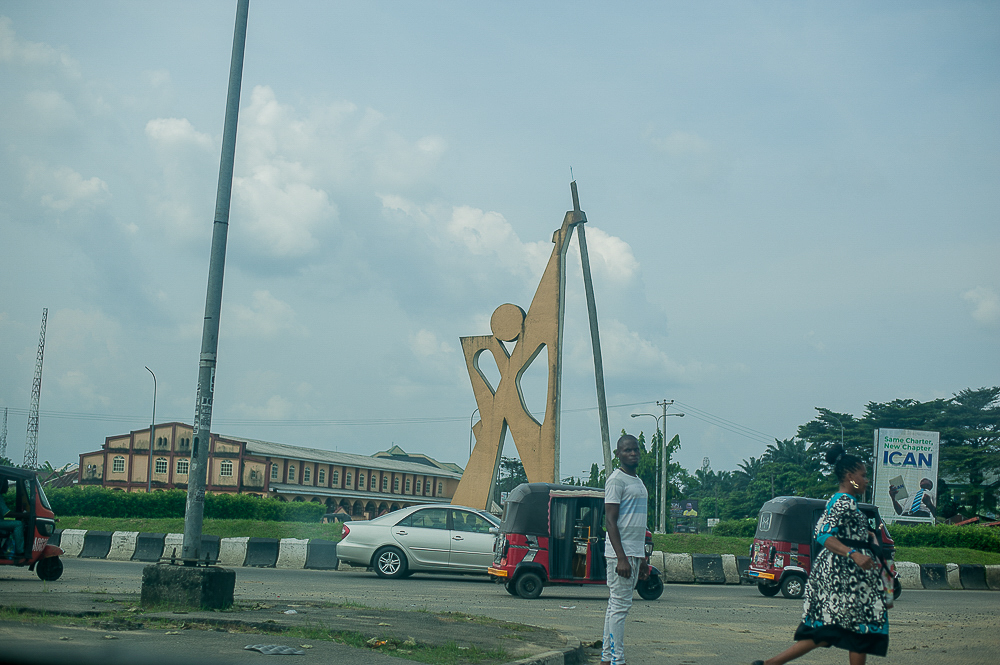

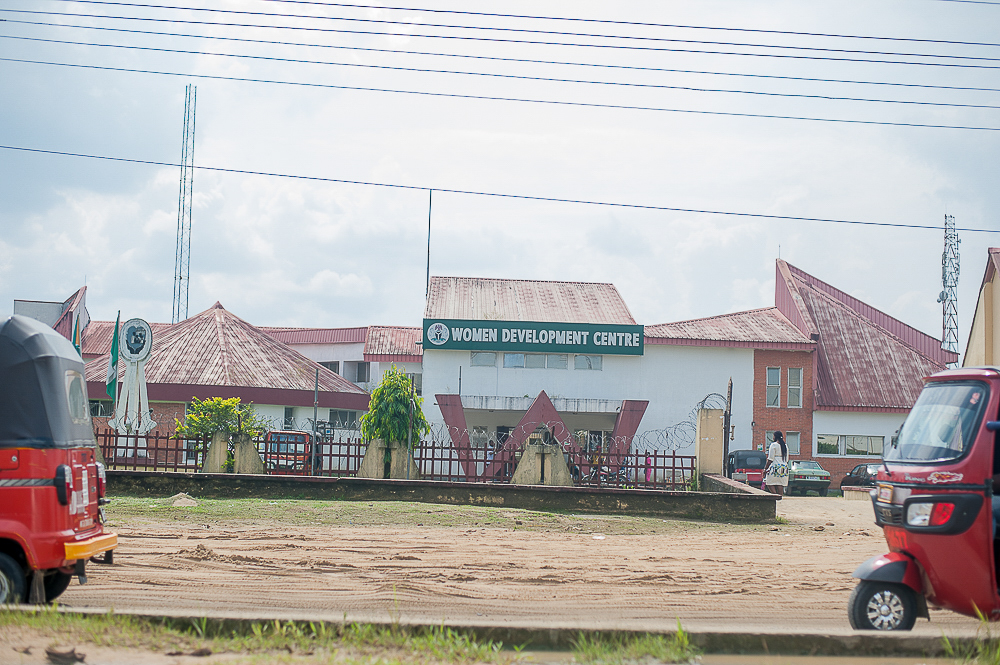

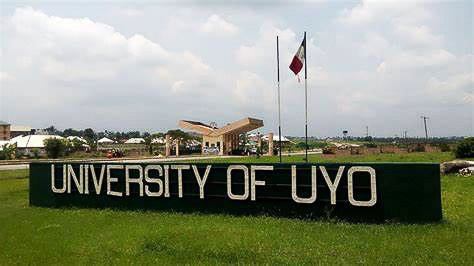
University of Uyo

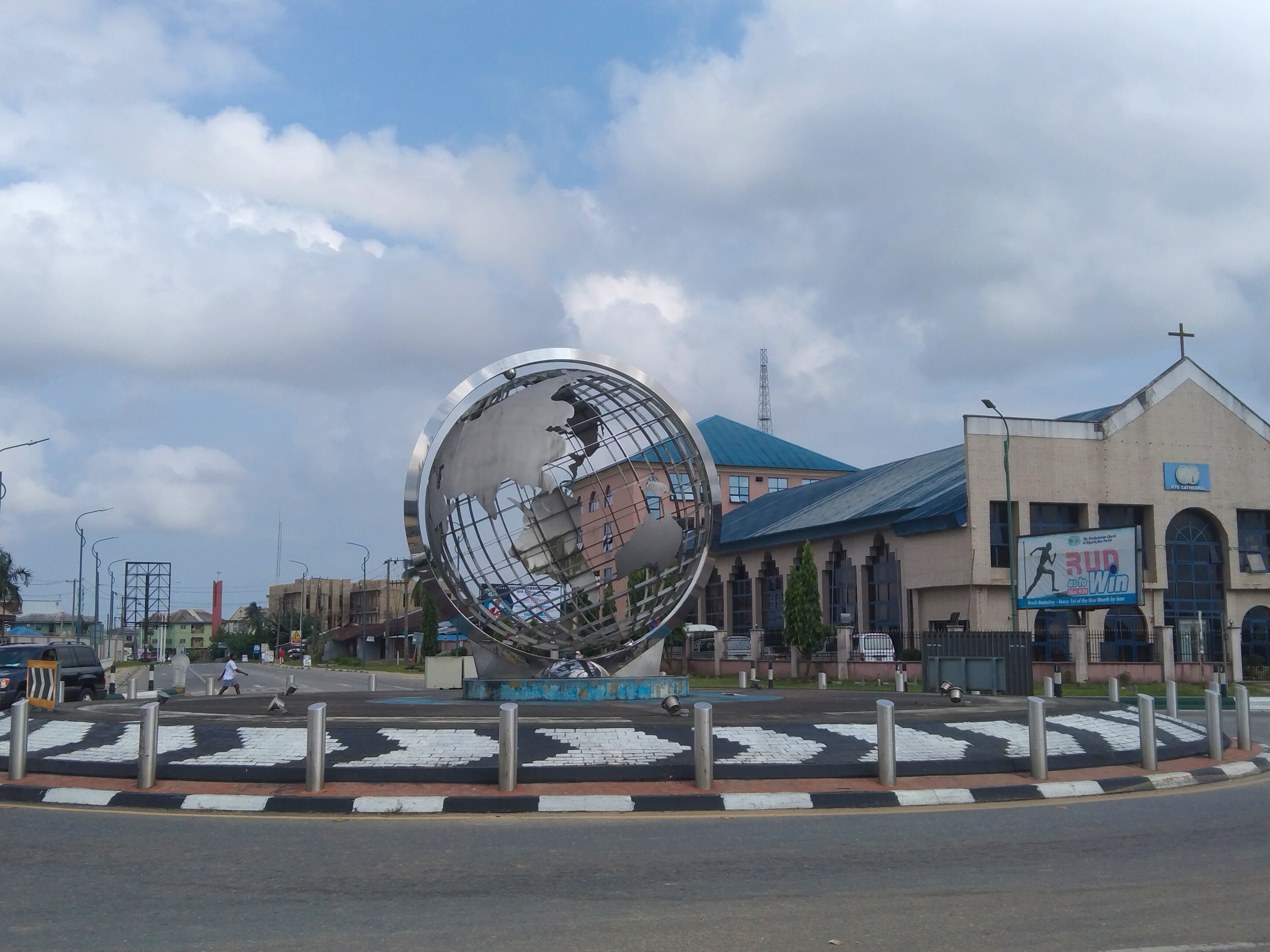

== See also ==
- Ibom Tropicana Entertainment Centre
- Ibom plaza
