= Forum Traiani (titular see) =

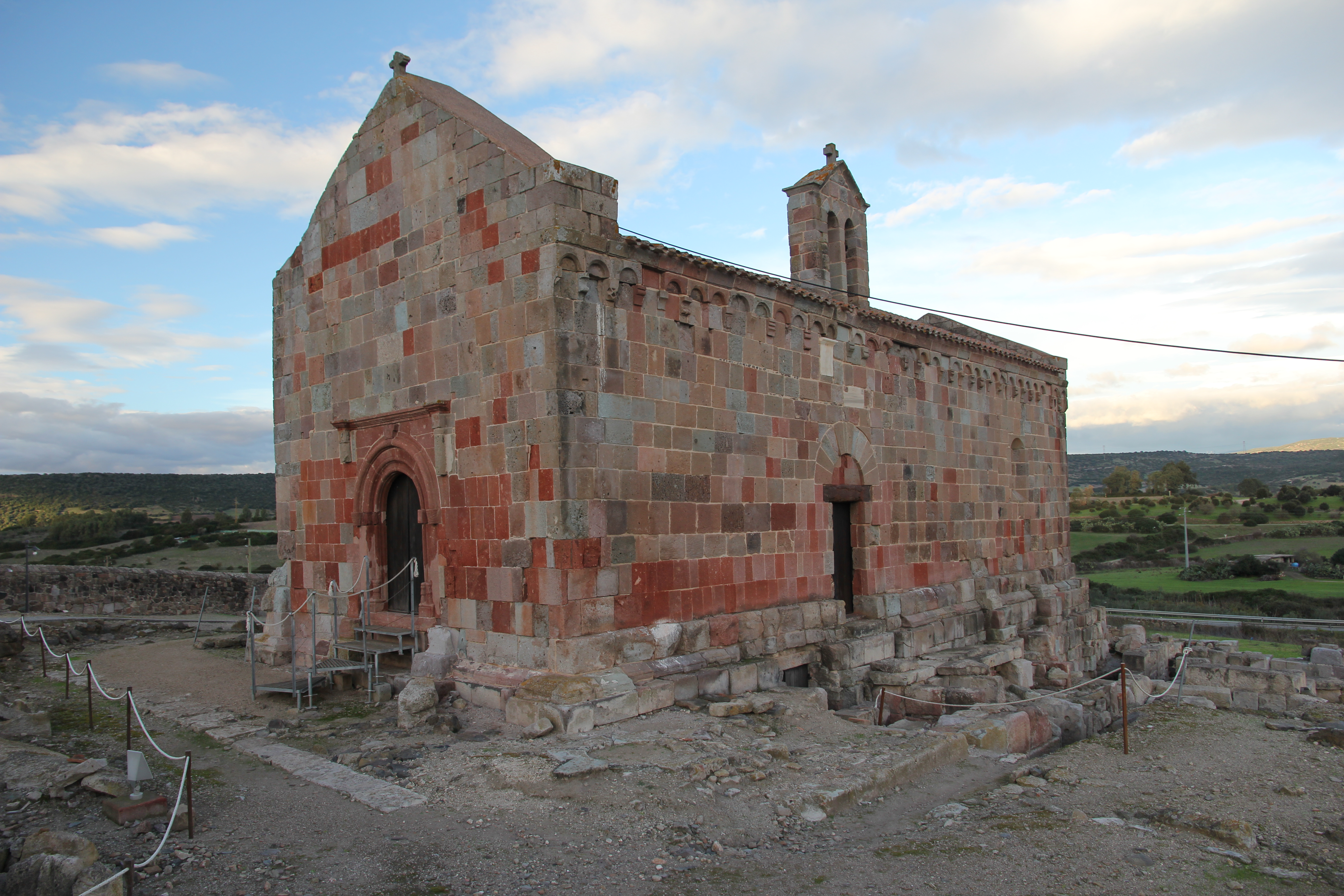
A destroyed house

The episcopal see centred on the town of Forum Traiani (today Fordongianus in Sardinia) is now a titular see of the Catholic Church.

The Latin adjective used in relation to the see is Foritraianensis.

The first titular bishop of the see was appointed on 18 May 1968.
