= Patrick Whitney =

The Rt. Rev. Patrick Joseph Monsignor Whitney (1894–1942) was an Irish priest who in 1932 founded the Saint Patrick’s Society for the Foreign Missions, also known as the Kiltegan Fathers.

Monsignor Whitney was born in Ballyfermoyle, between Keadue and Lough Key in the north of County Roscommon, on the borders with County Sligo and County Leitrim. He was educated locally and at St. Mel's College, Longford.

He was training as a priest in Maynooth College for the Diocese of Ardagh and Clonmacnoise when, on the invitation of Bishop Joseph Shanahan, he volunteered as a priest in Nigeria where he went with Fr Thomas Roynane in the 1920s. His cousin, Fr Patrick Francis Whitney, was one of the first three members of the society.

In 1939, due to ill health, he returned to Ireland and was replaced as Prefect Apostolic of Ogoja in Nigeria by future Bishop Thomas McGettrick.
