= Dominic Ekandem =

Nigerian Catholic cardinal (1917–1995)

His Eminence Dominic Ignatius Ekandem
- Cardinal, Archbishop-Bishop Emeritus of Abuja
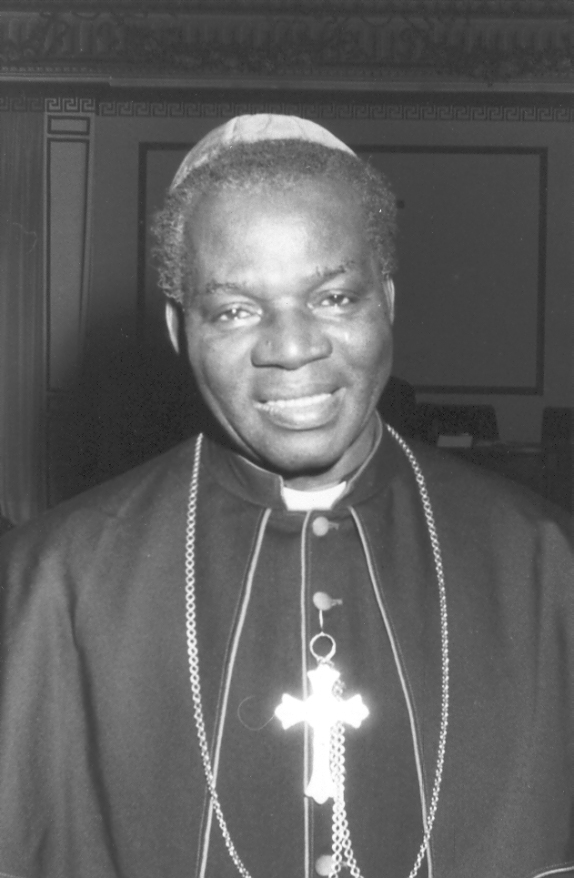
- Church: Roman Catholic Church
- Diocese: Abuja
- See: Abuja
- Appointed: 19 June 1989
- Term ended: 28 September 1992
- Successor: John Olorunfemi Onaiyekan
- Other post: Cardinal-Priest of San Marcello (1976-95)
- Previous posts: Titular Bishop of Hierapolis in Isauria (1953-63); Auxiliary Bishop of Calabar (1953-63); Bishop of Ikot Ekpene (1963-89); Apostolic Administrator of Port Harcourt (1970-73); President of the Nigerian Bishops' Conference (1973-79); Ecclesiastical Superior of Abuja (1981-89)

Orders
- Ordination: 7 December 1947 by Charles Heerey
- Consecration: 7 February 1954 by James Moynagh
- Created cardinal: 24 May 1976 by Pope Paul VI
- Rank: Cardinal-Priest

Personal details
- Born: Dominic Ignatius Ekandem; 1917 Obio Ibiono, Ibiono LGA, Akwa Ibom State, Nigeria
- Died: 24 November 1995 (aged 77–78) Abuja, Nigeria
- Motto: In cruce salus
- Coat of arms

Dominic Ignatius Ekandem (1917 – 24 November 1995) was a Nigerian Catholic Cardinal who served as Archbishop of Abuja from 1989 until 1992. He was the first native West African Catholic Cardinal in history. He also founded the Missionary Society of Saint Paul of Nigeria (M.S.P.).

A native of Akwa Ibom State, Ekandem attended several Catholic seminaries before he became a priest. He was ordained on 7 December 1947, and became the first priest from the old Calabar province. His first assignment as bishop was as auxiliary of Calabar from 1953 to 1963. He was Bishop of Ikot Ekpene from 1963 to 1981; during that tenure, in April 1976, he was named a cardinal. He then became Ecclesiastical Superior of Abuja, and when Abuja became an Archdiocese in 1989, he became its Archbishop.

Ekandem died in 1995.
