= Diocese of Uyo =

Roman Catholic diocese in Akwa Ibom State, Nigeria

Diocese of Uyo Dioecesis Uyoensis
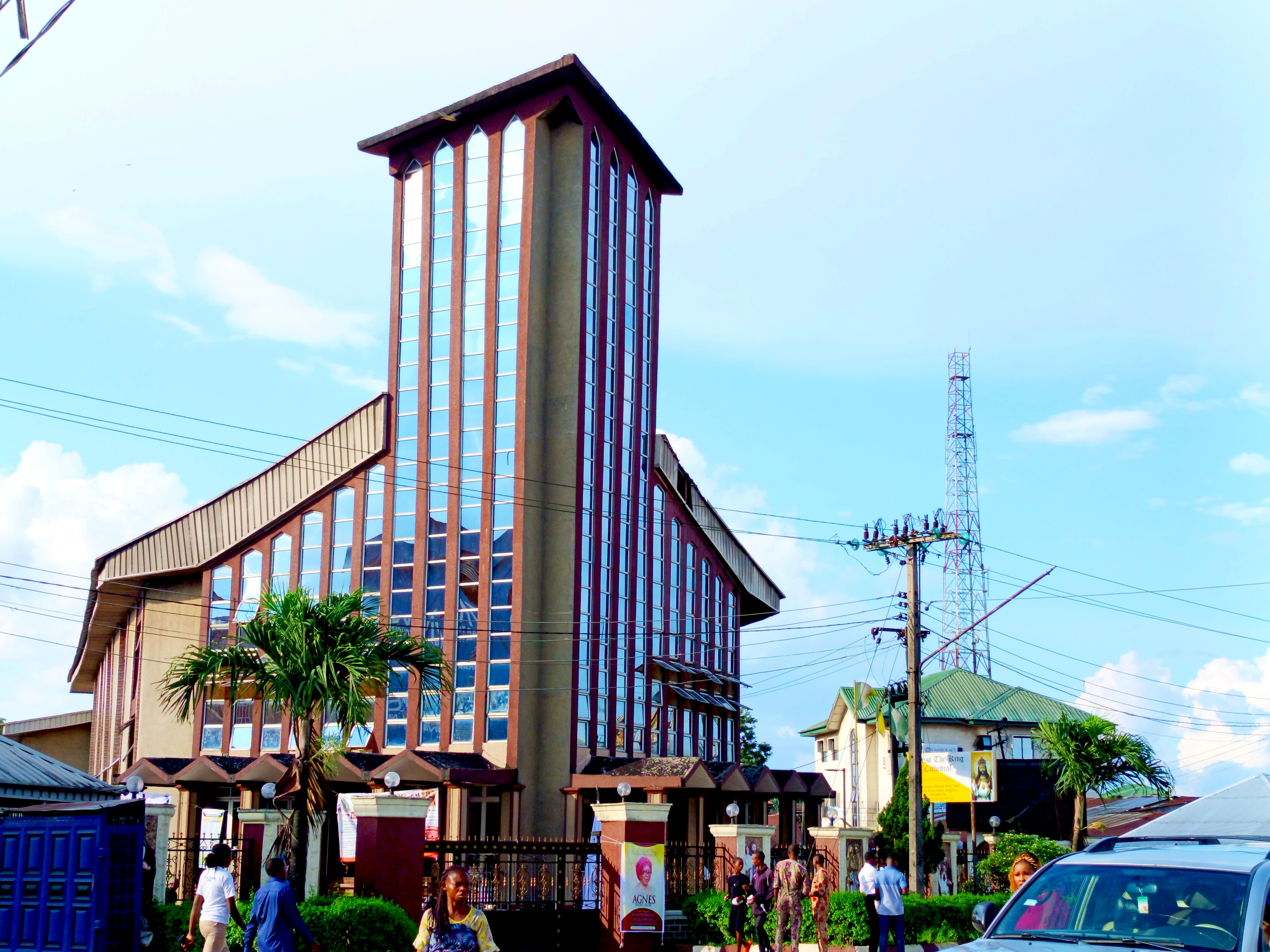
- Christ the King Cathedral, Uyo

Location
- Country: Nigeria
- Territory: Portions of Akwa Ibom State
- Ecclesiastical province: Calabar
- Metropolitan: Calabar
- Coordinates: 5°1′23.63″N 7°55′26″E

Statistics
- Area: 8,342 km^{2} (3,221 sq mi)
- Population: Total; Catholics: (as of 2022); 7,873,000; 988,158 (12.6%)
- Parishes: 92
- Congregations: 5 female; 3 male
- Schools: 5 secondary schools

Information
- Denomination: Catholic Church
- Sui iuris church: Latin Church
- Rite: Roman Rite
- Established: 4 July 1989
- Cathedral: Christ the King Cathedral in Uyo
- Secular priests: 119

Current leadership
- Pope: Leo XIV
- Bishop: Bishop John Ebebe Ayah
- Metropolitan Archbishop: Archbishop Joseph Effiong Ekuwem

Map
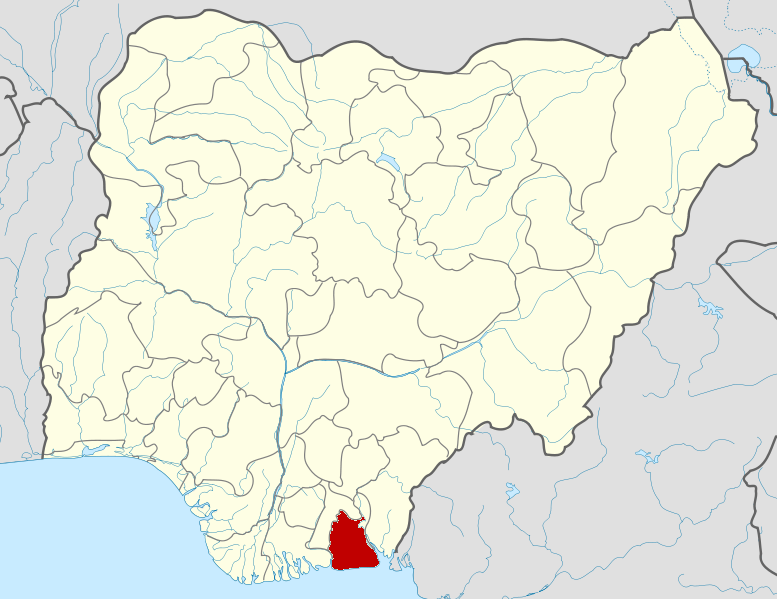
- Uyo is located in Akwa Ibom State which is shown in red.

Website
- www.CatholicDioceseofUyo.org

The Diocese of Uyo (Latin: Uyoën(sis)) is a Latin Church ecclesiastical territory or diocese of the Catholic Church in Nigeria. Its episcopal see is located in Uyo. The Diocese of Uyo is a suffragan diocese in the ecclesiastical province of the metropolitan Archdiocese of Calabar.

== History ==
- July 4, 1989: Established as Diocese of Uyo from the Diocese of Calabar

== Special churches ==
The diocesan cathedral is Christ the King Cathedral in Uyo.

== Leadership ==
- Bishops of Uyo
  - Bishop Joseph Effiong Ekuwem (July 4, 1989 - February 2, 2013), elevated to Archbishop of the Roman Catholic Archdiocese of Calabar, the Metropolitan See, by Pope Benedict XVI on Saturday, February 2, 2013
  - Bishop John Ebebe Ayah (Jul 5, 2014 -)

== See also ==
- Roman Catholicism in Nigeria
