= Michael Nnachi Okoro =

Nigerian clergyman (born 1940)

His Excellency, Most Reverend Michael Nnachi Okoro
- Bishop Emeritus of Abakaliki
- Church: St. Theresa’s Cathedral, Abakaliki, Ebonyi State
- Archdiocese: Archdiocese of Onitsha
- Province: Onitsha Ecclesiastical province
- Metropolis: Archbishop of Onitsha
- Diocese: Diocese of Abakaliki
- Appointed: 19 February 1983
- Term ended: 6 July 2021
- Predecessor: Thomas McGettrick
- Successor: Peter Nworie Chukwu
- Previous post: Auxiliary Bishop of Abakaliki, Nigeria Titular Bishop of Catabum Castra Titular Bishop of Catabum Castra

Orders
- Ordination: 19 December 1965
- Consecration: 27 November 1977 by Archbishop Girolamo Prigione †
- Rank: Bishop

Personal details
- Born: 1 November 1940 (age 85) Calabar, Nigeria
- Denomination: Catholicism
- Parents: Alphonsus Okoro †; Charlotte Okoro †

Michael Nnachi Okoro (born 1 November 1940) is a Nigerian prelate who served as bishop of the Diocese of Abakaliki from 19 February 1983 until his retirement on 6 July 2021.

== Background ==
Okoro is from Unwana in Afikpo North, Ebonyi State, Nigeria although he was born in Adiabo in Calabar, Cross River State. The last of 8 children, his father was a palm oil plantation manager in Calabar. Okoro attended St. Mary's Adiabo, Calabar from 1946 to 1952 for his primary education. Following the family's relocation to the village, Okoro continued his primary education in St. Mary's Afikpo, St. Patrick's Ndibe and St. Brigid's Ozizza in 1952, 1953 and 1954 respectively. He began his secondary education at St. Patrick College, SPC, Calabar, briefly between 1955 and 1956. In 1957, he transferred to Queen of Apostles Junior Seminary, Afaha Obong in Akwa Ibom State, where he studied till 1959. He proceeded to Bigard Memorial Seminary, Enugu.

== See also ==
- List of people from Ebonyi State
