= Ibom Tropicana Entertainment Centre =

Leisure and business resort in Uyo, Nigeria

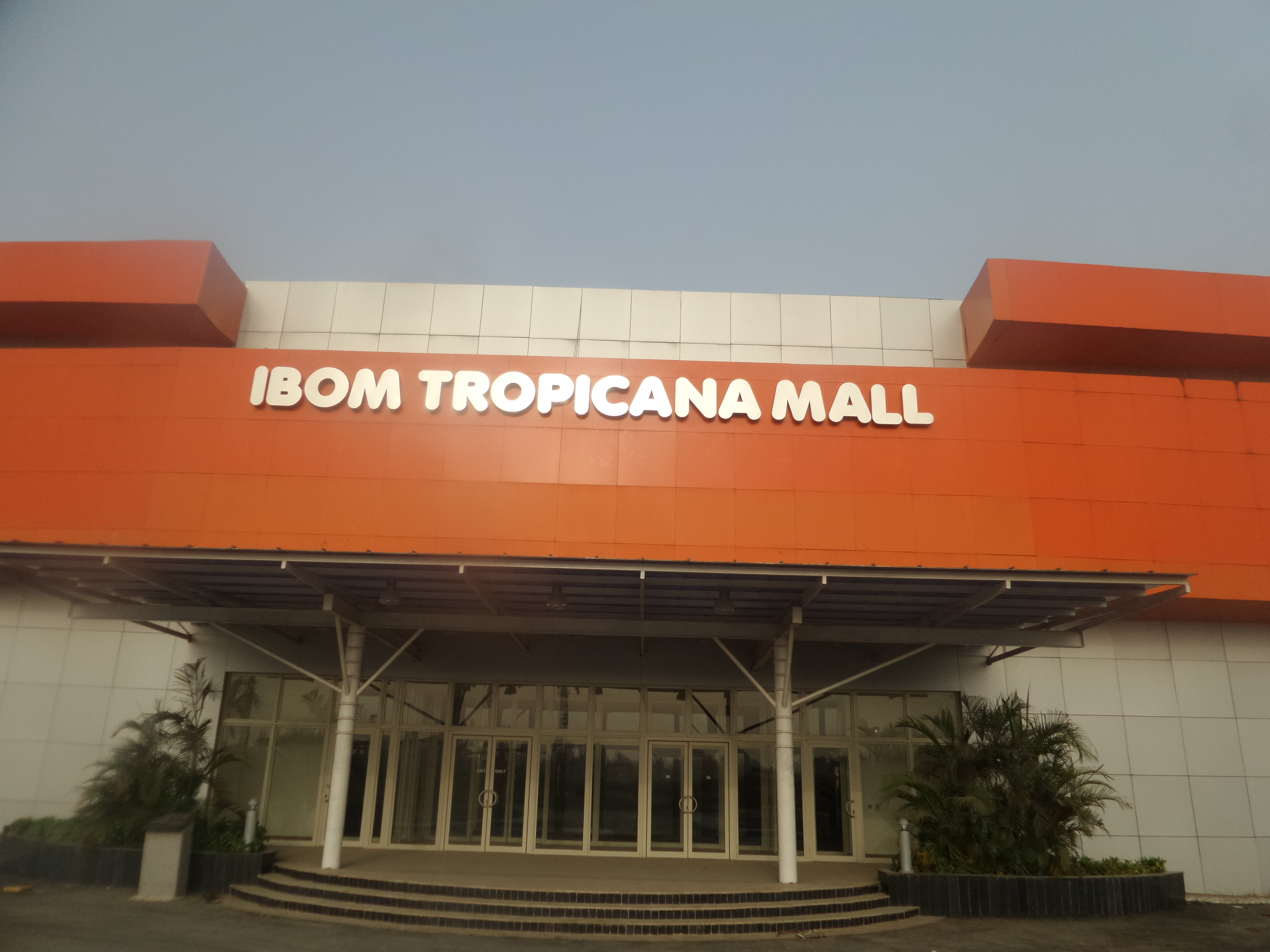
- Interactive map of the Ibom Tropicana Entertainment Centre area

General information
- Type: Leisure and business resort
- Location: Akwa Ibom, Nigeria
- Coordinates: 4.99864°N 7.94038°E

Technical details
- Floor count: 14
- Grounds: 3 hectares (7.4 acres)

Other information
- Number of rooms: 200

Ibom Tropicana Entertainment Centre is a proposed modern class leisure and business resort situated in Akwa Ibom State. The Ibom Tropicana Entertainment Centre has a 14 storey building five star hotel with over 200 rooms, a theme park that spreads over 3 hectares (7.4 acres) of land, a shopping mall, a convention centre with a 5000 capacity and an active cinema operated by Silverbird Cinemas.

Most parts of Ibom Tropicana Entertainment Centre is still currently under construction except the shopping mall and cinema which are fully completed and functional of date.

== See also ==
- Silverbird Cinemas, Uyo
