= Joseph Ekuwem =

Nigerian Catholic prelate

Joseph Effiong Ekuwem
- Archbishop of Calabar
- Church: Catholic Church
- Archdiocese: Archdiocese of Calabar
- Appointed: 2 February 2013
- Predecessor: Joseph Edra Ukpo
- Previous post: Bishop of Uyo (1989-2013)

Orders
- Ordination: 30 June 1979
- Consecration: 9 December 1989 by Paul Fouad Tabet

Personal details
- Born: 18 December 1949 (age 76)

Joseph Effiong Ekuwem (18 December 1949) is a Nigerian Catholic prelate who has served as the Archbishop of the Archdiocese of Calabar since 2 February 2013. Appointed by Pope Benedict XVI in 2013, he replaced Joseph Edra Ukpo. Ekuwem was the former bishop of the Diocese of Uyo.
