= Nwaniba =

- Urban
- Interactive map of Nwaniba
- Country: Nigeria
- State: Akwa Ibom
- Local Government Area: Uruan

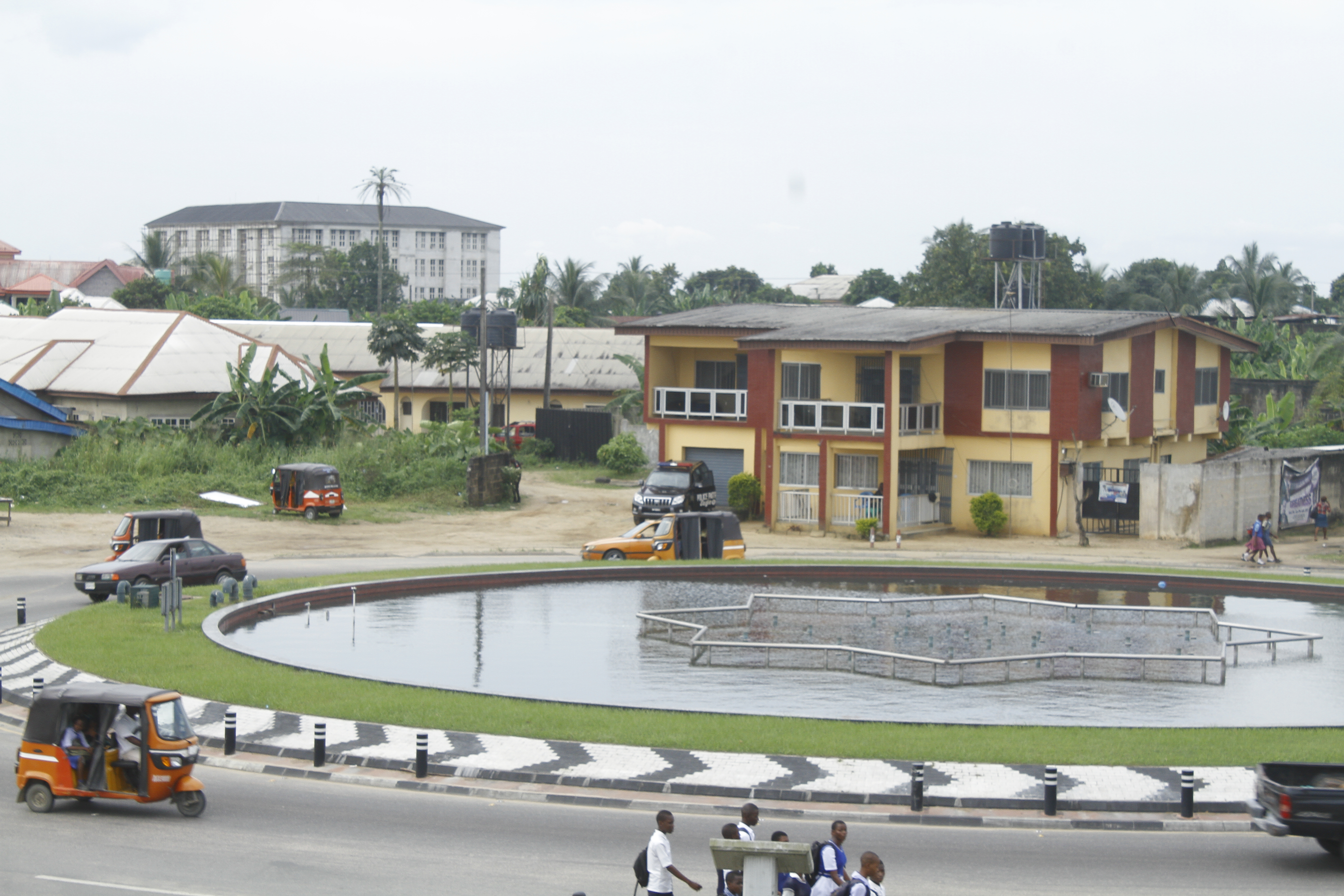
Nwaniba Waterfall, Akwa Ibom

Nwaniba is an urban village in Uruan local government area of Akwa Ibom state in Nigeria.
