= Saint Patrick's Society for the Foreign Missions =

Roman Catholic society of apostolic life

Saint Patrick's Missionary Society
- Societas Sancti Patritii pro Missionibus ad Exteros (Latin)
- Abbreviation: S.P.S. (post-nominal letters)
- Nickname: Kiltegan Fathers
- Formation: March 17, 1932; 94 years ago
- Founder: Msgr. Patrick Joseph Whitney, SPS
- Founded at: Kiltegan, County Wicklow, Ireland.
- Type: Society of Apostolic Life of Pontifical Right (for Men)
- Headquarters: International Headquarters , Nairobi, Kenya.
- Members: 345 members (253 priests) as of 2018
- Motto: Latin: Caritas Christi Urget Nos; English: Christ's love compels us
- Superior General: Fr. Richard Filima, SPS
- Ministry: Missionary and educational works
- Parent organization: Roman Catholic Church
- Website: http://www.spms.org/

St. Patrick's Missionary Society (Latin Societas Sancti Patritii pro Missionibus ad Exteros; also known as the Kiltegan Fathers) is a Catholic society of apostolic life of pontifical right for men composed of missionary priests. Its headquarters were at Kiltegan in County Wicklow, Ireland. The headquarters were later moved to Nairobi, Kenya. Its members add the nominal initials SPS after their names to indicate their membership in the Society. The motto in Latin and English of the Society is Caritas Christi Urget Nos and Christ's love compels us (2 Corinthians 5:14), respectively.

== History ==
The Kiltegan Fathers origins stem from an appeal in 1920 by Bishop Joseph Shanahan of the Holy Ghost Order to the seminary students in Maynooth College for missionaries to Nigeria, then part of the British Empire in Africa; Bishop Shanahan was a prelate in Nigeria at the time. Later that year, Fr. Whitney accompanied Bishop Shanahan to Africa.

The society was founded officially on St Patrick's Day, 17 March 1932, by Monsignor Patrick Whitney (1894 - 1942) at Kiltegan, County Wicklow, Ireland. Its original aim was the Christian evangelisation of Nigeria. In 1951, the society expanded its missionary activities outside of Nigeria.

In the 1950s the society expanded, building a new college in Kiltegan, and opening a House of Studies in Sutton House, Rochestown, Douglas, in Cork, with seminarians attending lectures in University College Cork.

In 1997, the Kiltegan Fathers, with the drop in vocations from Ireland, officially decided to open up internationally and set up houses of formation in Nigeria and Kenya. In 2000 trainee priests began studying philosophy in St Joseph's Institute in Cedara, South Africa, and KwaPatrick house was set up. 2002 seen students study theology at the Kiltegan House in Nairobi, as the Society joined other orders in Tangaza University College. Also in 2002 a house of formation was founded in Lusaka, Zambia.

As of 2024, the society has 253 priests and 70 students on formation on four continents including the countries of Nigeria, Cameroon, Kenya, Malawi, South Sudan, Zambia, Zimbabwe, South Africa, Uganda, Grenada, Brazil, the United States, Italy, England, Scotland, Wales and Ireland.

=== St. Patricks Missionary College - High Park, Kiltegan ===
The Society moved to High Park, about 2 km from Kiltegan in County Wicklow, the former home of the Westby family, and named it St. Patrick's. It had been donated by a Catholic businessman, John Hughes, to Fr. Pat Whitney in 1929. Fr. Whitney took over the building in 1930. The High Park residence had been rebuilt after it had been damaged in the 1798 rebellion.

==== People Associated with St. Patrick's College, Kiltegan ====
Bishop James Kavanagh, taught in Kiltegan. Seán J. White the writer, academic, broadcaster and journalist and Don Mullan the humanitarian and media producer, studied in Kiltegan.

=== Timeline ===
- 1920 - Appeal by Bishop Joseph (Ignatius) Shanahan
- 1929 - Donation of High Park, Kiltegan to Fr Whitney
- 1932 - Formal Foundation
- 1934 - Kiltegans take charge of Calabar when the Diocese was divided
- 1951 - First Mission outside Nigeria was to Kenya
- 1956 - Kiltegan Fathers took over Kitui, Kenya from the Holy Ghost Fathers
- 1961 - First mission to Brazil
- 1967 - Outbreak of the Nigerian Civil War
- 1970 - Kiltegan Fathers went to West Indies
- 1970 - Kiltegan Fathers went to Malawi
- 1983 - Mission in South Sudan
- 1989 - Seen Missions to Cameroon, South African and Zimbabwe
- 1993 - Society first sought members from outside Ireland
- 1997 - Society opened houses of formation in East, West and Central Africa
- 2015 - Headquarters moved to Nairobi, Kenya

=== Abuse cases ===
In May 2011 allegations of sexual abuse by a member of the society in Africa were made on the RTÉ programme Prime Time Investigates.

Jeremiah McGrath, SPS was convicted in Liverpool, England in May 2007 for facilitating abuse by a paedophile named Billy Adams. McGrath had given Adams £20,000 in 2005 and Adams had used the money to impress 12-year-old Jade Critchlow whom he then raped over a six-month period. McGrath denied knowing about the abuse but admitted having a brief sexual relationship with Adams. His appeal in January 2008 was dismissed.

In 2003 the society paid €325,000 for abuse committed by Fr. Peter Kennedy, SPS in 1982.

== Notable members of the Society ==
- Bishop Derek Byrne, SPS - Bishop of Primavera do Leste–Paranatinga, Brazil (2014-2023), Bishop of Guiratinga, Brazil (2008-2014)
- Bishop Edmund Fitzgibbon, SPS - Bishop of the Roman Catholic Diocese of Warri in Nigeria.
- Bishop John Magee, SPS - Bishop of Roman Catholic Diocese of Cloyne, Ireland (1987–2010), Master of Papal Ceremonies, The Vatican (1982–1987), Papal Private Secretary, The Vatican (1978–1982).
- Bishop William Dunne, SPS - Bishop of Kitui (1963-1995)
- Bishop John Christopher Mahon, D.C.L, SPS - Bishop of Lodwar, Kenya (1978-2000),
- Bishop James Moynagh, SPS (1903 - 1985)
- Bishop John Alphonsus Ryan MA PhD, SPS
- Bishop Thomas McGettrick, SPS, first Bishop of Abakaliki, Nigeria
- Bishop Maurice Anthony Crowley BSc, SPS, Bishop of the Roman Catholic Diocese of Kitale, Kenya (1998-2022)

== Current organisation ==
In 2014 St Patrick's Missionary Society held a General Chapter meeting which elected a new leadership team. In 2015 the society commenced moving its headquarters from Kiltegan in Ireland to Nairobi in Kenya. The Society produces the Africa - St. Patrick's Mission magazine. The Society has installed a wind turbine in Kiltegan. There is also a retirement home in Kiltegan for its members.

The Kiltegan Fathers in association with Sisters of the Holy Faith in 2013, worked to set up a primary school in Riwoto, South Sudan.
