= List of Catholic churches in Port Harcourt =

The following is a list of Roman Catholic churches in Port Harcourt, Nigeria.

The Diocese of Port Harcourt covers the city of Port Harcourt.

== Diocese of Port Harcourt ==
Congregation	Location
All Saints	Rumueme
Blessed Tansi	New Rumukrushi
Blessed Tansi	Woji
C.K.C Church	Mile 1, Diobu
Chapel of the Annunciation	University of Port Harcourt
Christ the King	Diobu
Church of Assumption	NTA Mgbuoba
Church of Divine Mercy	Eneka Road
Church of Nativity	Rumuewhara
Church of Transfiguration	Rumukalagbo, off Stadium Road
Church of the Visitation	Atali
Corpus Christi Cathedral	No. 1 Kaduna Street, D-line
Holy Family	Woji
Holy Spirit	Mgbuoba, Ozuoba
Holy Trinity Catholic Church	Tere-Ama
Immaculate Heart	Diobu
Mater Misericordiae	Rumuomasi
Our Lady of Fatima	Choba
Our Lady of the Holy Rosary Chaplaincy	CIWA
Our Lady of Lourdes	Creek road
Our Lady of Victory	Rumuodomaya
Our Lady Seat Of Wisdom	Rivers State University of Science and Technology
Queen of Apostles	Rumuepirikom
Sacred Heart	Mile 2, Diobu
St. Aloysius	Trans Amadi
St. Clement's	Ozuoba
Saint Dominic	Bane-Ogoni
St. Elizabeth's	Akiama Bonny
St. Francis	Rumuokwuta
St Gabriel's	Rumuosi
St. John	Iwofe
St. John Paul II	Eliozu
St. John's	Rumuokwurushi
St Joseph's	Borokiri
St. Jude's	Rumuokoro
St. Kizito	Eliogbolo
St. Mary's	Aggrey Road
St. Margaret's	Creek Road
St Michael	Diobu
St. Paul's	Alesa
St. Paul's	Diobu
Saint Peter	Ahoada
St. Peter	Trans Amadi
St Peter Claver	Rumuodara
St. Pius X	Iriebe
St. Raphael's	Bonny
St. Raphael's	Rukpokwu
St. Thomas	Trans Amadi
Saint Vincent De Paul	Uruala, Mile 2, Diobu
Saints Peter and Paul	Elelenwo
Church of Divine Mercy	Eneka
St. James	Eneka
Mater Eclessia	Eneka

== See also ==
- Bishop of Port Harcourt
- List of Roman Catholic cathedrals in Nigeria
- List of Roman Catholic dioceses in Nigeria
- Roman Catholicism in Nigeria
