= Camillus Archibong Etokudoh =

Nigerian Roman Catholic bishop

The Most Reverend Camillus Archibong Etokudoh
- Bishop Emeritus of Harcourt
- Church: Roman Catholic
- See: Port Harcourt
- Appointed: 4 May 2009
- Installed: 25 July 2009
- Term ended: 9 April 2025
- Predecessor: Alexius Obabu Makozi
- Previous post: Bishop of Ikot Ekpene (1989–2009)

Orders
- Ordination: 2 July 1978
- Consecration: 14 May 1988

Personal details
- Born: August 3, 1949 (age 77) Ikot Uko Etor, Essien Udim, Akwa Ibom State, Nigeria

Camillus Archibong Etokudoh (born 3 August 1949) is a Nigerian Catholic prelate who served as the bishop of Port Harcourt from 2009 to 2025.

== Biography ==
Born in Ikot Uko Etor in Essien Udim local government area of Akwa Ibom State, Archibong was ordained a priest on 2 July 1978. He served as Titular Bishop of Capra and Auxiliary Bishop of Ikot Ekpene from 1988 to 1989 and as Bishop of Ikot Ekpene from 1989 to 2009.

Pope Benedict XVI named him Bishop of Port Harcourt on 4 May 2009.

Pope Francis accepted his resignation on 9 April 2025.
