= Diocese of Port Harcourt =

Roman Catholic diocese in Rivers State, Nigeria

Diocese of Port Harcourt Dioecesis Portus Harcurtensis

Location
- Country: Nigeria
- Territory: Rivers State
- Ecclesiastical province: Calabar
- Metropolitan: Calabar
- Deaneries: 11
- Coordinates: 4°46′38″N 7°00′48″E

Statistics
- Area: 10,500 km^{2} (4,100 sq mi)
- Population: Total; Catholics: (as of 2022); 6,567,892; 1,257,000 (19.1%)
- Parishes: 188
- Schools: 1 Tertiary Institution (CIWA), Bishop Okoye Memorial Spiritual Year Seminary, Kpean, Khana LGA, 1 Minor Seminary (Sacred Heart Seminary, Rumuibekwe), 15 Secondary Schools and 44 Primary Schools

Information
- Denomination: Catholic Church
- Sui iuris church: Latin Church
- Rite: Roman Rite
- Established: 16 May 1961
- Cathedral: Corpus Christi Cathedral in D-line, Port Harcourt
- Secular priests: 197

Current leadership
- Pope: Leo XIV
- Bishop: Vacant
- Auxiliary Bishops: Patrick Eluke
- Apostolic Administrator: Patrick Eluke
- Bishops emeritus: Camillus Archibong Etokudoh

Map
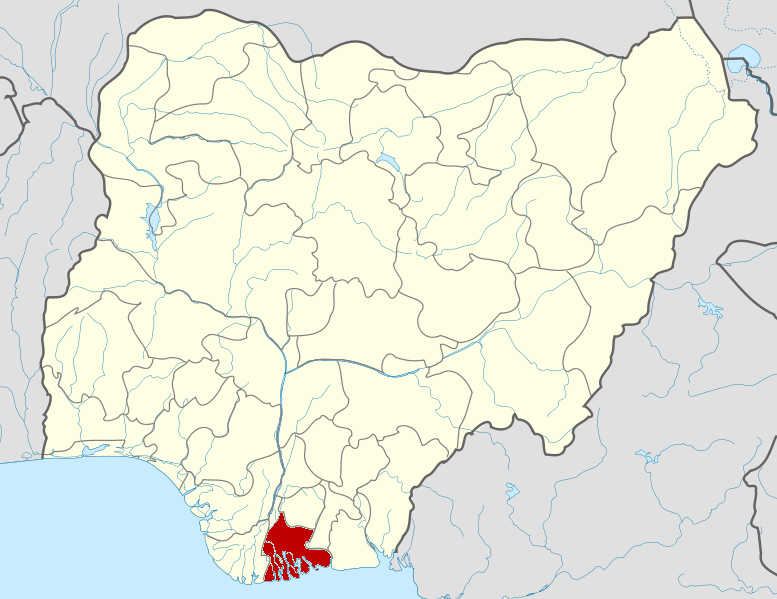
- Port Harcourt is located in Rivers State which is shown in red.

Website
- www.catholicdioceseofportharcourt.org

The Diocese of Port Harcourt (Latin: Portus Harcurten(sis)) is a Latin Church ecclesiastical territory or diocese of the Catholic Church in Nigeria. The episcopal see is Port Harcourt, Rivers State. The Diocese of Port Harcourt is in the ecclesiastical province of metropolitan Archdiocese of Calabar.

== History ==
- May 16, 1961: Established as Diocese of Port Harcourt from the Diocese of Owerri

== Special churches ==
The diocesan cathedral is Corpus Christi Cathedral located in D-line, Port Harcourt.

== Bishops ==
- Bishops of Port Harcourt
  - Bishop Godfrey Okoye, C.S.Sp. (1961.05.16 – 1970.03.07), appointed Bishop of Enugu
  - Bishop Alexius Obabu Makozi (1991.08.31 - 2009.05.04)
  - Bishop Camillus Archibong Etokudoh (since 2009.05.04 - 2025.04.09)

=== Auxiliary Bishops ===
- Bishop Patrick Eluke (since 12 February 2019)

=== Apostolic Administrator ===
- Bishop Patrick S. Eluke (since 9 April 2025)

== See also ==
- Roman Catholicism in Nigeria
- List of Roman Catholic churches in Port Harcourt

== Sources ==
- GCatholic.org Information
- Catholic Hierarchy
