= Nicola Rollock =

British academic, activist and writer

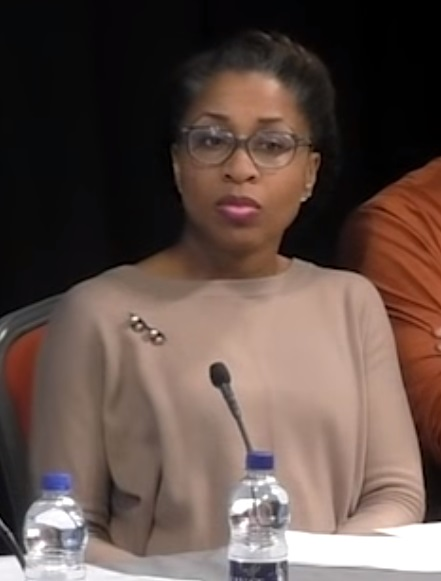
- Rollock in 2019
- Born: South West London, England
- Education: University of Liverpool; Birkbeck, University of London; UCL Institute of Education
- Scientific career
- Workplaces: London Metropolitan University; UCL Institute of Education; Goldsmiths, University of London; University of Birmingham; University of Cambridge; King's College London
- Thesis: Legitimate players? : an ethnographic study of academically successful Black pupils in a London secondary school (2006)
- Website: nicolarollock.com

Nicola Rollock is a British academic, writer and activist. She is professor of social policy and race at King's College London, having previously been reader in equality and education at Goldsmiths College, University of London, and has written several books, including The Colour of Class: The educational strategies of the Black middle classes (2014). She has been included in the Powerlist of the most influential black Britons and has received the PRECIOUS award for her work in racial equality.

== Early life and education ==
Rollock was born in South West London, England, to parents from Barbados. Her father encouraged her to focus on her education; she enjoyed reading as a child, and eventually studied English literature. She studied psychology at the University of Liverpool and graduated with a bachelor's degree in 1994. Rollock's further education included a Postgraduate Certificate in Family and Couple Therapy at Birkbeck, University of London. She was appointed head of education at the Runnymede Trust in 2001. For her doctoral studies she moved to the UCL Institute of Education, where she researched the educational attainment of black students in British secondary schools.

== Research and career ==
After completing her doctorate in 2006, Rollock was appointed a postdoctoral fellow at London Metropolitan University, where she spent three years, before returning to the UCL Institute of Education as a research associate. Her research revealed that black children still faced an attainment gap, even if they were as rich as their white counterparts. She has presented her research as evidence to parliament on the attainment of black pupils. Together with the Runnymede Trust, Rollock published The Stephen Lawrence Inquiry 10 Years On, which looked at how British policing must evolve to support the diverse British population. The recommendations included sharing effective practice on recording racist incidents across the criminal justice system, improving the monitoring of racially motivated crime, increasing public scrutiny, addressing the retention and progression of black staff and reviewing the effectiveness of Stop and Search. The report was presented to the Home Office and Ministry of Justice in 2009.

In her 2019 report Staying Power (the title of which pays homage to Peter Fryer's 1984 book of the same name that documents the history of Black people in Britain), Rollock identified that there were fewer than thirty black British women professors in the United Kingdom, as of February 2019. This shockingly low number (there are 18,000 professors, more than 14,000 of whom are white men) was covered in The Guardian, Vogue and Stylist. Rollock identified that the underrepresentation of black women was due to explicit bias, bullying and racial stereotyping. Rollock is committed to making the black women professors more visible, as well as encouraging and supporting more women in to academia. The Black Female Professors Forum was established by Iyiola Solanke in 2019.

In 2019, Rollock was appointed to the Home Affairs Select Committee Macpherson Report: Twenty Years On inquiry, which will examine progress in the two decades since the Murder of Stephen Lawrence. She was appointed lead on the black and minority ethnic (BAME) attainment gap at Goldsmiths, University of London. In this role, she leads a working group that engages academic and professional services staff as well as students to understand the origins of the achievement gap, and implement various solutions. The efforts are part of a wide Government of the United Kingdom initiative to end inequalities between different ethnicities in higher education.

Rollock serves on the Wellcome Trust Diversity & Inclusion Steering Group and the British Science Association Equality, Diversity and Inclusion Advisory Group. She is a member of the BBC Academy. Rollock provides regular comment on racial inequality to the media. She has criticised universities for engaging "with race in superficial ways".

Related to her research, Rollock curated the touring exhibition Phenomenal Women: Portraits of UK Black Female Professors, aiming "to challenge perceptions of what a professor looks like, to highlight the intersectionality of race and gender and to showcase the achievements of this under-represented group of academics." Featuring photographs by Bill Knight, Phenomenal Women was displayed at locations including in 2020 at London's Southbank Centre and at the University of Cambridge in 2021. (Note: The Black female professors featured were: Gloria Agyemang, Joan Anim-Addo, Bugewa Apampa, Uduak Archibong, Diamond Ashiagbor, Florence Ayisi, Fareda Banda, Claudia Bernard, Sonia Boyce, Enitan Carrol, Donna Chambers, Nelarine Cornelius, Patricia Daley, Jacqueline Dunkley-Bent, Dawn Edge, Akwugo Emejulu, Engobo Emeseh, Bernardine Evaristo, Lynette Goddard, Stephani Hatch, Gina Higginbottom, Marilyn Holness, Adele Jones, Tessa McWatt, Heidi Mirza, Dorothy Monekosso, Francisca Mutapi, Bertha Ochieng, Phoebe Okowa, Funmi Olonisakin, Olivette Otele, Ann Phoenix, Cynthia Pine, Tracey Reynolds, Laura Serrant, Maria Stokes, Iyiola Solanke, Shirley Anne Tate, Patricia Tuitt, Carol Tulloch, Ijeoma Uchegbu, Ola Uduku, Toni Williams, Marcia Wilson, and Cecile Wright.)

Rollock is a Distinguished Fellow of the Faculty of Education of the University of Cambridge. In September 2021, she was appointed Professor of Social Policy and Race at King's College London.

Rollock is the founding editor of the Routledge journal Whiteness and Education. She has written for The Conversation and the Financial Times.

=== Awards and honours ===
Rollock's awards and honours include:

- 2015: Woman of Achievement by the Women of the Year Council
- 2016: PRECIOUS Award
- 2019: Powerlist of Britain's most influential people of African and African Caribbean heritage

=== Selected publications ===
Rollock's publications include:

- Gillborn, David; Nicola Rollock; Carol Vincent; Stephen J. Ball (4 January 2012). "'You got a pass, so what more do you want?': Race, class and gender intersections in the educational experiences of the Black middle class". Race Ethnicity and Education. 15: 121–139. doi:10.1080/13613324.2012.638869. S2CID 144262389.
- Vincent, Carol; Nicola Rollock; Stephen Ball; David Gillborn (20 July 2011). "Being strategic, being watchful, being determined: Black middle-class parents and schooling". British Journal of Sociology of Education. 33 (3): 337–354. doi:10.1080/01425692.2012.668833. S2CID 145702395.
- Rollock, Nicola (4 January 2012). "The invisibility of race: intersectional reflections on the liminal space of alterity". Race Ethnicity and Education. 15: 65–84. doi:10.1080/13613324.2012.638864. S2CID 143508824.
- The Colour of Class: The educational strategies of the Black middle classes. Routledge. 2014. ISBN 978-0415809825.
- The Racial Code: Tales of Resistance and Survival. Allen Lane. 2022. ISBN 978-0241521052.
