= Farzana Shain =

British sociologist

Farzana Shain is a British sociologist, academic, and author. Her research focuses on “educational inequalities, social justice and education, race and racisms, gender and education, education policy and politics, and the educational implications of 9/11 and the war on terror.” From 2015 to 2019, Shain was the Professor of Sociology of Education at Keele University, England, where she served as the director of the Research Centre for Social Policy and led studies on tackling inequalities at Institute for Social Inclusion. In 2020, she joined Goldsmiths, University of London as the George Wood Professor in Education.

== Career ==
For a 1997–99 Economic and Social Research Council (ESTC) funded project, undertaken at Keele, Shain and Denis Gleeson examined the evolving governance conditions in the post-incorporated further education (FE) sector.

In 2013, a research team, comprising Shain, Ruth Dann, then senior lecturer and PGCE primary course director at Manchester Metropolitan University, Steve Cropper, then professor of management at School of Public policy and Professional Practice at Keele, and Laura Watt, then research fellow at Research Institute of Social Sciences at Keele, was commissioned by Stoke-on-Trent City Council to “explore strategies for raising attainment at Key Stage 1.” The first phase of the 30-month project focused on identifying the key factors, using a range of performance indicators, that enabled local city schools to improve their educational outcomes.

With Keele’s Bulent Gokay, Shain received the 2012–13 British Academy small grant to study children’s understanding of peak oil. The research was awarded follow-on funding in 2016–17 from Keele to study children’s understanding of fracking, for which Shain served as a principal investigator alongside Gokay and Keele’s Sian Edwards.

In 2016, Shain received a Leverhulme Trust Research Fellowship (2017–19) grant to document narrative accounts of British muslim girls about their past, present, and future lives. For the project, she teamed up with director Parvez Qadir and filmmaker Kirstie Henderson to create Changing the Narrative (2020), a short documentary film exploring how a group of seven young British muslim women feel about the different ways in which their identity is framed by media outlets as well as policy and political discourses. The film aimed to initiate critical dialogue and discussion with educational institutions and policy makers about potential interventions that can be developed and implemented to “change the narrative in relation to the (mis)representations of Muslim girls and women.”

In 2021, Shain was one of the six academics in the Generation Delta partnership who were awarded Research England and Office for Students support of almost £800,000 for the collaborative project that “aims to improve access to postgraduate study and academic careers for black, Asian and minority ethnic (BAME) students.” Led by University of Leeds Professor Iyiola Solanke, Generation Delta will run for four years starting January 2022 to “improve the experiences and outcomes of BAME female students through three key phases of the postgraduate research ‘lifecycle’–accessing the academy, retention and progression, and training for careers.” Shain received £103,000 of the total project funding for work at Goldsmiths, with the remainder amount being distributed amongst the universities of Leeds, Plymouth, Reading, Sheffield and Sunderland.

Shain is a member of the International Association for Human Rights Education’s steering committee. Between 2015 and 2023, she was on the executive board of British Journal of Sociology of Education; she has been part of the Journal’s editorial board since 2003. In 2017, she was appointed to the international editorial advisory board of Human Rights Education Review. She has been a co-editor of the Journal of Global Faultlines since 2012, and a member of the advisory board of the Multidisciplinary Journal of Social Diversity since 2013.

== Selected publications ==
=== Books ===
- Shain, Farzana (2011). The New Folk Devils: Muslim Boys and Education in England. Stoke-on-Trent, UK: Trentham Books Limited. ISBN 978-1-85856-442-5.
- Shain, Farzana (2003). The Schooling and Identity of Asian Girls. Stoke-on-Trent, UK: Stylus Publishing, LLC. ISBN 978-1-85856-181-3.
- Bhopal, Kalwant; Shain, Farzana (2015-12-07). Neoliberalism and Education. Routledge. ISBN 978-1-138-18253-0.

=== Book chapters ===
- Shain, Farzana (2024). “Addressing the triple challenge of right-wing populism, nationalism and colonial amnesia in and through human rights education”. In Osler, Audrey and Goldschmidt-Gjerløw, Beate (eds.). Nordic Perspectives on Human Rights Education Research and Practice for Social Justice. Abingdon: Routledge. pp. 241–246. ISBN 978-1-032-37537-3.
- Shain, Farzana (2020). “Educating”. In Mathewman, Steve, Curtis, Bruce and Mayeda, Daniel (eds.). Being Sociological. London: Macmillan International (Red Globe Press). pp. 219–236. ISBN 978-1-352-01115-9.
- Shain, Farzana (2020). “Minority Students in the UK”. In David, Miriam and Amey, Marilyn (eds.). The Sage Encyclopedia of Higher Education. Sage. pp. 1062–1064. ISBN 978-1-4739-4291-2.
- Shain, Farzana (2017). “Dangerous radicals or symbols of crisis and change: re-theorising the status of Muslim boys as a threat to the social order”. In Ghaill, Máirtín Mac and Haywood, Chris (eds.). Muslim Students, Education and Neoliberalism: Schooling a 'Suspect Community'. Basingstoke: Palgrave Macmillan, pp. 17–33. ISBN 978-1-137-56921-9.
- Shain, Farzana (2014). “Intersections of 'race', class and gender in the social and political identifications of young Muslims in England”. In Bhopal, Kalwant and Preston, John (eds). Intersectionality and "Race" in Education. London: Routledge, pp. 138–156. ISBN 978-1-138-02151-8

=== Journal articles ===
- Hayes, Aneta and Shain, Farzana (2023). “Whiteness, citizenship of class and educational privilege of Eastern European pupils in British schools”. Whiteness and Education. 8(1): 82-100. ISSN 2379-3406.
- Shain, Farzana (2021). “Navigating the unequal education space in post-9/11 England: British Muslim girls talk about their educational aspirations and future expectations”. Educational Philosophy and Theory. 53(3): 270-287. ISSN 0013-1857.
- Shain, Farzana, Yildiz, Umit, Poku, Veronica and Gokay, Bulent (2021). “From silence to ‘strategic advancement’: institutional responses to ‘decolonising’ in higher education in England”. Teaching in Higher Education. 26(7-8): 920-936. ISSN 1356-2517.
- Shain, Farzana (2020). “Race matters: confronting the legacy of empire and colonialism”. British Journal of Sociology of Education. 41(2): 272-280. ISSN 0142-5692.
- Kaur-Aujla, Harjnder, Shain, Farzana and Lilley, Alison (2019). “A Gap Exposed: What is Known About Sikh Victims of Domestic Violence Abuse (DVA) and Their Mental Health?”. European Journal of Mental Health.14(1): 179 -189.
