= Umoren =

Umoren is a surname, and may refer to:

- Anselm Umoren (born 1962), Nigerian Catholic prelate
- Imoh Umoren (born 1982), Nigerian filmmaker

== See also ==
- Killing of Iniubong Umoren
