= List of cathedrals in Nigeria =

This is a list of cathedrals in Nigeria, sorted by denomination.

Cathedral of the Holy Cross

Cathedral Church of Christ, Marina

== Catholic ==
=== Latin Church ===
The following Latin Church cathedrals and pro-cathedrals of the Catholic Church in Nigeria are located in Nigeria:

- Assumpta Cathedral in Owerri
- Cathedral Basilica of the Most Holy Trinity in Onitsha
- Cathedral of Christ the King in Zaria
- Cathedral of Our Lady of Assumption in Nnewi
- Cathedral of Our Lady of Fatima in Jos
- Cathedral of the Sacred Heart of Jesus in Shendam
- Cathedral of St. Anthony of Padua in Uromi
- Cathedral of St. John Evangelist in Bauchi
- Cathedral of St. Michael the Archangel in Awgu
- Christ the King Cathedral in Aba
- Christ the King Cathedral in Uyo
- Corpus Christi Cathedral in D-line, Port Harcourt
- Holy Cross Cathedral in Benin City
- Holy Cross Cathedral in Lagos
- Holy Family Cathedral in Sokoto
- Holy Ghost Cathedral in Enugu
- Holy Trinity Cathedral in Orlu
- Immaculate Conception Cathedral in Auchi
- Immaculate Conception Cathedral in Lokoja
- Mater Ecclesiae Cathedral in Ahiara
- Mater Dei Cathedral in Umuahia
- Our Lady of the Assumption Cathedral in New Oyo
- Our Lady of Fatima Cathedral in Kano
- Our Lady of Perpetual Help Cathedral in Makurdi
- Our Lady of the Waters Cathedral in Ughelli
- Our Lady Queen of Nigeria Pro-Cathedral in Abuja
- Sacred Heart Cathedral in Akure
- Sacred Heart Cathedral in Calabar
- Sacred Heart Cathedral in Warri
- St. Anne's Cathedral in Ikot Ekpene
- St Augustine's Cathedral in Jalingo
- St. Benedict's Cathedral in Ogoja
- St Benedict's Cathedral in Osogbo
- St. Boniface Cathedral in Idah
- St Francis' Cathedral in Otukpo
- St. John's Pro-Cathedral in Abak
- St. Joseph's Cathedral in Ilorin
- St. Joseph's Cathedral in Kaduna
- St. Mary's Cathedral in Okigwe
- St Mary's Catholic Cathedral in Ibadan
- St. Mary's Pro-Cathedral in Calabar
- St Michael's Cathedral in Kontagora
- St. Michael's Cathedral in Minna
- St Patrick's Cathedral in Ado-Ekiti
- St. Patrick's Cathedral
- St Patrick's Cathedral in Maiduguri
- St Paul's Cathedral in Issele-Uku
- St. Peter and St. Paul Cathedral in Abeokuta
- St Peter Claver's Cathedral in Kafanchan
- St. Sebastian's Cathedral in Ijebu-Ode
- St. Theresa's Cathedral in Abakaliki
- St. Theresa's Cathedral in Nsukka
- St Theresa's Cathedral in Yola
- St. William's Cathedral in Lafia

=== Eastern Rites ===
The following Eastern Rite Catholic cathedrals are located in Nigeria:

- Our Lady of the Annunciation Cathedral in Ibadan (Maronite Rite)

== Anglican ==
The following cathedrals of the Church of Nigeria are located in Nigeria:

- Cathedral Church of Christ in Lagos
- Cathedral Church of Emmanuel, Okesha, Ado-Ekiti
- Cathedral Church of Saint Mary Magdalene Oguta
- Archbishop Vining Memorial Church Cathedral, Ikeja
- St. Luke's Cathedral, Jos
- St. John's Cathedral, Yola
- Cathedral Church of St. Peter, Ake, Abeokuta
- The Cathedral Church of the Advent, Gwarinpa, Abuja
- The Cathedral of St. James the Great, Oke-Bola, Ibadan
- Cathedral of St. Paul, Gbongan, Osun
- All Saints' Cathedral, Rumuokwurusi
- St. Paul's Cathedral, Diobu, Port Harcourt
- Cathedral of the Good Shepherd, Enugu
- Cathedral of St. Peters, Aremo
- All Saints' Cathedral, Osogbo
- All Saints' Cathedral, Egbu, Owerri
- All Saints' Cathedral, Ozala, Onitsha
- St. Peter's Cathedral, Okrika
- Cathedral Church of St. Paul, Sagamu

== See also ==
- Christianity in Nigeria
- List of cathedrals
