= Martin Dada Abejide Olorunmolu =

- Bishop of Lokoja
- Church: Latin Church
- In office: November 11, 2005
- Predecessor: Joseph Sunday Ajomo

Orders
- Ordination: December 23, 1978 by Alexius Obabu Makozi
- Consecration: February 11, 2006 by John Onaiyekan

Personal details
- Born: August 30, 1948 (age 76); Ogiri-Kabba, Kabba Province, Northern Nigeria, Colony and Protectorate of Nigeria (now Kabba, Nigeria)
- Motto: Domine peto sapientiam tuam

Martin Dada Abejide Olorunmolu (born August 30, 1948 in Ogiri-Kabba) is a Nigerian clergyman and bishop for the Roman Catholic Diocese of Lokoja. He was appointed bishop in 2005.

== See also ==
- Catholic Church in Nigeria
