= Uduak =

Uduak is a given name of Efik and Ibibio origin meaning “will” or “desire”. It can be diminutive of Uduak-Abasi, the will/desire of God. Though unisex, it is mostly given to girls. Notable bearers include:

- Uduak Amimo, Kenyan journalist
- Uduak Archibong, Nigerian nurse and academic
- Uduak Isong, Nigerian scriptwriter and producer
- Christy Uduak Essien-Igbokwe (1960–2011), Nigerian musician and actress
- Ezekiel Uduak Akpan, Nigerian kidnapper convicted in the killing of Iniubong Umoren
- Joan Uduak Ekah (born 1980), Nigerian sprinter
