= Turuda =

Ancient city and diocese in Africa

Turuda was an ancient Roman-Berber city and former diocese in Africa Proconsulare in Algeria. It is currently a Roman Catholic titular see.

== History ==
Turuda was important enough in the Roman province of Africa proconsularis to become one of the many suffragans of its great capital Carthage's Metropolitan Archbishop, but was to fade like most.

== Titular see ==
In 1989 it was nominally restored as a Latin titular bishopric.

It has had the following incumbents of the lowest (episcopal) rank :

- Sigitas Tamkevičius, Jesuits (S.J.), (1991.05.08 – 1996.05.04), as Auxiliary Bishop of Kaunas (Lithuania) (1991.05.08 – 1996.05.04), later promoted Metropolitan Archbishop of Kaunas (1996.05.04 – 2015.06.11), President of Episcopal Conference of Lithuania (1999.11.03 – 2002.09.20), Vice-President of Episcopal Conference of Lithuania (2002.09.20 – 2005.09.20), President of Episcopal Conference of Lithuania (2005.09.20 – 2014.10.28)
- Eugenio Romero Pose (1997.03.07 – death 2007.03.25), Auxiliary Bishop of Madrid (Spain) (1997.03.07 – 2007.03.25)
- Anthony Ademu Adaji, Missionary Society of Saint Paul of Nigeria (M.S.P.) (2007.06.28 – 2009.06.01), as Auxiliary Bishop of Idah (Nigeria) (2007.06.28 – 2009.06.01); later succeeded as Bishop of Idah (2009.06.01 – ...)
- Woldeghiorghis Mathewos (2010.01.20 – ...), Apostolic Vicar of Hosanna (Ethiopia)
