= A123 highway (Nigeria) =

Road in Nigeria

Coordinates: 8.435946°N 4.593658°E

Trunk Road A123

Location
- Country: Nigeria

Highway system
- Transport in Nigeria

The A123 highway is a highway in Nigeria. It is one of the east-west roads linking the main south-north roads.(It is named from the two highways it links).

It runs from the A1 highway at Ilorin, the capital of Kwara State to the A2 highway north of Okene, Kogi State. The main town on the route is Kabba.
