= Oroko =

Oroko may refer to:

- Oroko language
- Hyacinth Oroko Egbebo
