= Enitan Carrol =

British physician and Professor

- Education: University of Aberdeen
- Scientific career
- Workplaces: University of Liverpool

Enitan Carrol is a British physician and Professor of Clinical Infection, Microbiology and Immunology. Carrol studies the mechanisms that underpin bacterial infection. In 2020 she was featured in Nicola Rollock's exhibition Phenomenal Women: Portraits of UK Black Female Professors.

== Early life and education ==
Carrol studied medicine at the University of Aberdeen.

== Research and career ==
In 2013 Carrol was made a Professor at the University of Liverpool. Her research considers the biological mechanisms that underpin bacterial infections. Carrol has investigated clinic deterioration of children, and looked to understand whether the use of a paediatric early warning score (PEWS) could be used to prevent admission to critical care. In particular, she proposed the use of VitalPAC, an electronic handheld device that healthcare professionals can use to document vital signs and automatically calculate PEWS. Patients with a higher PEWS score require more urgent medical attention, and alert messages are sent to senior nurses and doctors.

She is a member of the National Institute for Health and Care Excellence (NICE) sepsis development group. As part of this work, Carrol has studied the use of antibiotics in treating sepsis. She is interested in whether Procalcitonin (PCT) could be used to improve the assessment and treatment of sepsis. In 2020 Carrol started to work with Imperial College London on the development of rapid diagnostic tests for severe illnesses through the use of gene signatures. Such tests will study the genetic make-up of patient blood samples, and compare them to a comprehensive library of the gene signatures of particular diseases.

== Academic service ==
Carrol is the Knowledge Exchange Lead at the University of Liverpool Institute of Infection and Global Health. As of February 2019, there were only 25 Black women professors in the United Kingdom. She is a member of Iyiola Solanke's Black Female Professor Forum. In 2020 her portrait was included in Nicola Rollock's exhibition, Phenomenal Women: Portraits of UK Black Female Professors.

== Publications ==
- Davila, Sonia; Wright, Victoria J; Khor, Chiea Chuen; Sim, Kar Seng; Binder, Alexander; Breunis, Willemijn B; Inwald, David; Nadel, Simon; Betts, Helen; Carrol, Enitan D; de Groot, Ronald (2010). "Genome-wide association study identifies variants in the CFH region associated with host susceptibility to meningococcal disease". Nature Genetics. 42 (9): 772–776. doi:10.1038/ng.640. ISSN 1546-1718. PMID 20694013. S2CID 5946597.>
- Weiss, Scott L.; Peters, Mark J.; Alhazzani, Waleed; Agus, Michael S. D.; Flori, Heidi R.; Inwald, David P.; Nadel, Simon; Schlapbach, Luregn J.; Tasker, Robert C.; Argent, Andrew C.; Brierley, Joe (2020-02-01). "Surviving sepsis campaign international guidelines for the management of septic shock and sepsis-associated organ dysfunction in children". Intensive Care Medicine. 46 (1): 10–67. doi:10.1007/s00134-019-05878-6. ISSN 1432-1238. PMC 7095013. PMID 32030529.
- Carrol, Enitan D.; Guiver, Malcolm; Nkhoma, Standwell; Mankhambo, Limangeni A.; Marsh, John; Balmer, Paul; Banda, Daniel L.; Jeffers, Graham; White, Sarah A.; Molyneux, Elizabeth M.; Molyneux, Malcolm E. (May 2007). "High Pneumococcal DNA Loads Are Associated With Mortality in Malawian Children With Invasive Pneumococcal Disease". The Pediatric Infectious Disease Journal. 26 (5): 416–422. doi:10.1097/01.inf.0000260253.22994.61. ISSN 0891-3668. PMC 2810843. PMID 17468652.
