= John Onaiyekan =

Nigerian Catholic prelate (born 1944)

His Eminence John Onaiyekan
- Cardinal, Archbishop emeritus of Abuja
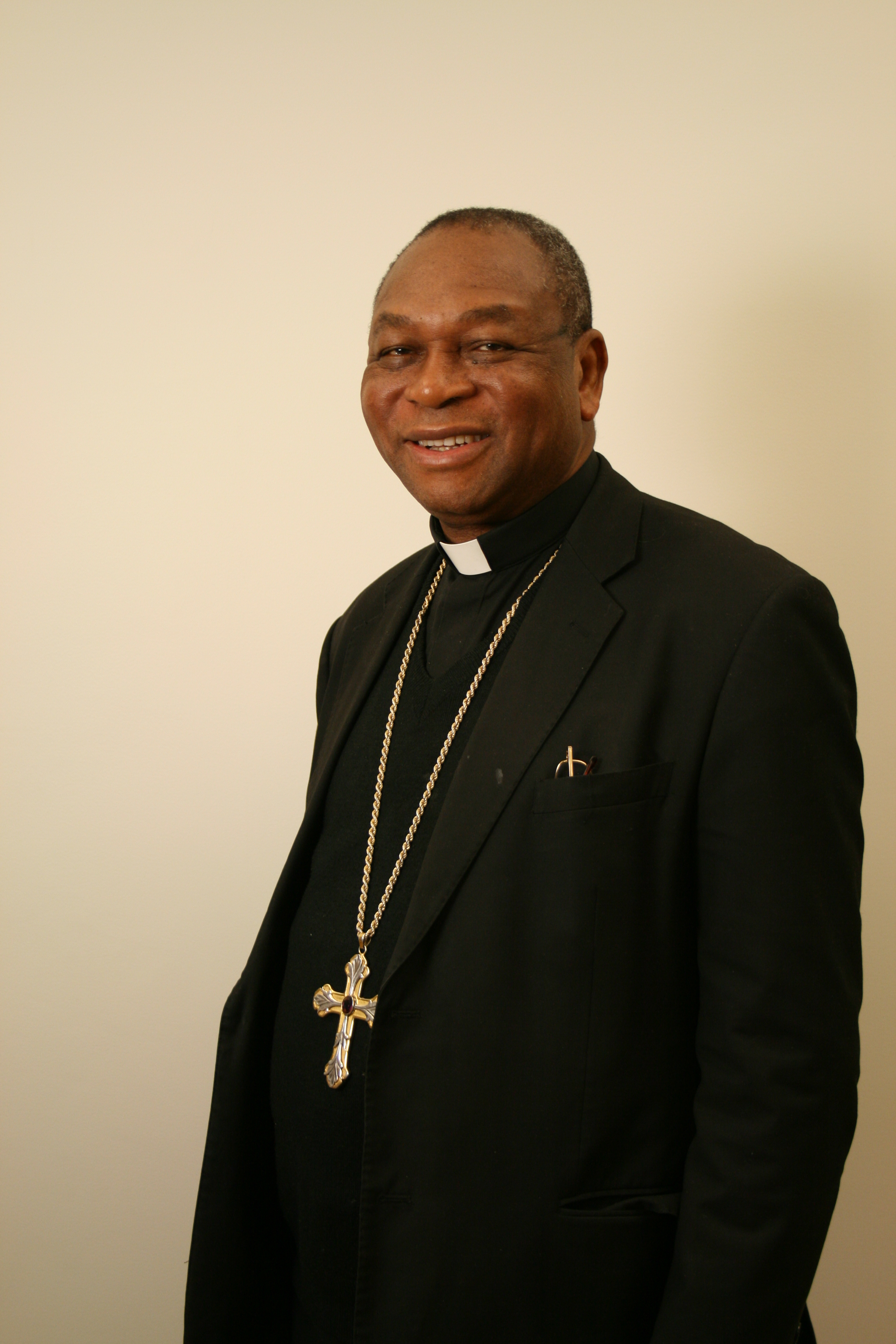
- Church: Catholic Church; Latin Church
- Archdiocese: Abuja
- Appointed: 7 July 1990 (Coadjutor); 28 Sep 1992 (Bishop); 26 Mar 1994 (Archbishop)
- Retired: 9 November 2019
- Predecessor: Dominic Ekandem
- Successor: Ignatius Ayau Kaigama
- Other post: Cardinal priest of San Saturnino (2012‍–‍present)
- Previous posts: Auxiliary Bishop of Ilorin (1982‍–‍1984); Titular Bishop of Thunusuda (1982‍–‍1984); Bishop of Ilorin (1984‍–‍1990); Coadjutor Bishop of Abuja (1990‍–‍1992); Bishop of Abuja (1992‍–‍1994); President, symposium of Episcopal Conference of Africa and Madagascar (2004–2007); Apostolic administrator of Ahiara (2013‍–‍2018)

Orders
- Ordination: 3 August 1969 by Auguste Delisle
- Consecration: 6 January 1983 by Pope John Paul II, Eduardo Martínez Somalo, Duraisamy Simon Lourdusamy
- Created cardinal: 24 November 2012 by Pope Benedict XVI
- Rank: Cardinal Priest

Personal details
- Born: John Olorunfemi Onaiyekan; 29 January 1944 (age 82) Kabba, Colonial Nigeria
- Motto: Fiat voluntas tua (Latin for 'Thy Will Be Done')
- Coat of arms: John Onaiyekan's coat of arms

Ordination history of John Onaiyekan
History
Priestly ordination
- Ordained by: Auguste Delisle
Episcopal consecration
- Principal consecrator: Pope John Paul II
- Co-consecrators: Eduardo Martínez Somalo, Duraisamy Simon Lourdusamy
Cardinalate
- Elevated by: Pope Benedict XVI
Episcopal succession
Bishops consecrated by John Onaiyekan as principal consecrator
- Michael Ekwoy Apochi: 2003
- Martin Dada Abejide Olorunmolu: 2006
- Anselm Umoren: 2012
- Godfrey Igwebuike Onah: 2013
- Michael Gobal Gokum: 2014

John Olorunfemi Onaiyekan (born 29 January 1944) is a Nigerian prelate of the Catholic Church. He was archbishop of the Latin Church archdiocese of Abuja from 1994 to 2019 and was made a cardinal in 2012. He has served as president of the Christian Association of Nigeria, president of the Catholic Bishops' Conference of Nigeria, President of The Symposium of Episcopal Conferences of Africa and Madagascar (SECAM), and bishop of Ilorin.

== Education and early career ==
Onaiyekan was born in the town of Kabba, in what is now Kogi State, to Bartholomew and Joann Onaiyekan. He attended St. Mary's Catholic School in Kabba from 1949 until 1956, Mount St. Michael's Secondary School in Aliade, Benue State, from 1957 until 1962, and Ss. Peter & Paul Major Seminary in Bodija, Ibadan, from 1963 until 1965. He completed his religious studies in Rome in 1969 and was ordained as a priest on 3 August of that year by Bishop Auguste Delisle of Lokoja Diocese. Ahmadu Bello, Premier of Nigeria's Northern Region, had offered him a scholarship to study abroad.

Onaiyekan taught at St. Kizito's College, Isanlu, in 1969. He became rector of St. Clement Junior Seminary in Lokoja in 1971. He completed his Licentiate of Sacred Scripture at the Pontifical Biblical Institute in 1973 and earned his doctorate in 1976. He became Vice Rector of Ss. Peter & Paul in 1977.

== Church leader ==
In October 1980, Pope John Paul II named Onaiyekan to a five-year term on the International Theological Commission. In November, he joined the International Catholic/Methodist Dialogue Commission.

Onaiyekan was appointed auxiliary bishop of Ilorin in Kwara State, and titular bishop of Thunusuda on 10 September 1982. He received his episcopal consecration on 6 January 1983 by Pope John Paul II. He was named Bishop of Ilorin on 20 October 1984. On 7 July 1990 he was appointed coadjutor bishop of Abuja. When that diocese became an Archdiocese on 26 March 1994, Onaiyekan became its first archbishop.

Onaiyekan was elected vice-president of the Catholic Bishops' Conference of Nigeria (CBCN) in 1994 and president of that body in 2000.

During the administration of Nigerian president Olusegun Obasanjo, and especially during his second term between 2004 and 2007, Onaiyekan spoke out against the regime for its failure to support democratic principles and its corruption. Speaking in a service in his cathedral in 2005 with the president in attendance, he called on Obasanjo to resist the temptation to stand for a third term, which the Nigerian constitution did not allow, and asked him to "resist the deadly temptation to want to remain in power perpetually by hook or by crook". His stance was credited with saving Nigeria from the imposition of a dictatorship. He was named Pax Christi International's 2012 Peace Laureate.

In 2009 the archbishop entered into a widely televisied debate with church-critics Christopher Hitchens and Stephen Fry on whether the catholic Church is a force for the good.

On 18 September 2012, Pope Benedict XVI named Onaiyekan one of the Synod Fathers for the October 2012 Ordinary General Assembly of the Synod of Bishops on the New Evangelization.

He was created a cardinal by Pope Benedict XVI in a consistory on 24 November 2012. As Cardinal-Priest he was assigned to the titular church of San Saturnino.

On 31 January 2013, Pope Benedict XVI appointed Onaiyekan a member of the Congregation for the Doctrine of the Faith (CDF) and a member of the Presidential Committee of the Pontifical Council for the Family. He can hold these positions until his 80th birthday.

He was one of the cardinal electors who participated in the 2013 papal conclave that elected Pope Francis.

Pope Francis appointed Onaiyekan the Apostolic Administrator of the diocese of Ahiara in Imo State in eastern Nigeria on 3 July 2013.

Pope Francis appointed him to a five-year renewable term as a member of the Congregation for Divine Worship and the Discipline of the Sacraments in October 2016.

He won the election for the position of Christian Association of Nigeria (CAN) President on 19 June 2007 with 72 votes over Anglican Primate Peter Akinola who had 33 votes. In 2010 he was succeeded by Ayo Oritsejafor.

Pope Francis accepted his resignation as Archbishop of Abuja on 9 November 2019.

== Honours ==
- Pax Christi International Peace Award, 2012

== Works ==
- "The Priesthood in Pre-monarchial Ancient Israel and among the Owe-Yoruba of Kabba: A Comparative Study", unpublished dissertation (1976)
- "The shariah in Nigeria: a Christian view", Bulletin on Islam & Christian-Muslim Relations in Africa (1987)

Catholic Church titles
Preceded by Concordio Maria Sarte	— TITULAR — Titular Bishop of Thunusuda; 10 September 1982 – 20 October 1984	Succeeded by Germano Grachane
Preceded by William Mahony	Bishop of Ilorin; 20 October 1984 – 7 July 1990	Succeeded by Ayo-Maria Atoyebi
Preceded by Dominic Ekandem	Archbishop of Abuja; 26 March 1994 – 9 November 2019	Succeeded by Ignatius Ayau Kaigama
Preceded by Rodolfo Ignacio Quezada Toruño	Cardinal-Priest of San Saturnino; 24 November 2012 –	Incumbent
Religious titles
Preceded by Peter Akinola	President of the Christian Association of Nigeria; 19 June 2007 – 5 July 2010	Succeeded by Ayo Oritsejafor
