= Joseph Sunday Ajomo =

Nigerian catholic priest (1939-2004)

- Bishop of Lokoja
- Church: Catholic Church
- Diocese: Diocese of Lokoja
- In office: 6 March 1992 – 21 June 2004
- Predecessor: Alexius Obabu Makozi
- Successor: Martin Dada Abejide Olorunmolu

Orders
- Ordination: 19 December 1964
- Consecration: 3 May 1992 by Jozef Tomko

Personal details
- Born: 11 June 1939 Ogori, Colony and Protectorate of Nigeria, British Empire
- Died: 21 June 2004 (aged 65)

Joseph Sunday Ajomo (born 11 June 1939 in Ogori, Nigeria – died 21 June 2004) was a Nigerian clergyman and bishop for the Roman Catholic Diocese of Lokoja. He became ordained in 1962. He was appointed bishop in 1992. He died in 2004.
