= Ephraim Obot =

Ephraim Silas Obot
- Bishop of Idah
- Church: Catholic Church
- Diocese: Diocese of Idah
- In office: 17 December 1977 – 12 April 2009
- Predecessor: Leopold Grimard
- Successor: Anthony Adaji
- Previous posts: Titular Bishop of Iunca in Byzacena (1971-1977); Auxiliary Bishop of Ikot Ekpene (1971-1977)

Orders
- Ordination: 29 June 1968
- Consecration: 31 October 1971 by Amelio Poggi

Personal details
- Born: 6 October 1936 Adiasim (in present-day Essien Udim LGA]], Annano Province, Colony and Protectorate of Nigeria, British Empire
- Died: 12 April 2009 (aged 72)

Ephraim Silas Obot (6 October 1936 – 12 April 2009) was the Nigeria bishop of the Roman Catholic Diocese of Idah on Nigeria from his appointment on 17 December 1977, until his death in 2009.

Obot was first ordained as a Roman Catholic priest on 29 June 1968, Ikot Ekpene, Nigeria. He died on 12 April 2009, at the age of 72.

== Sources ==
- Catholic Bishops Conference of Nigeria: Bishop Obot dies at 72
- Catholic Hierarchy: Bishop Ephraim Silas Obot †
