= Catholic Television of Nigeria =

- Mambolo Strt. Wuse Zone 2; Nigeria
- City: Abuja
- Branding: CTV

Programming
- Affiliations: African Independent Television

Ownership
- Owner: Roman Catholic Archdiocese of Abuja
- Sister stations: Studio Veritas

History
- Founded: January 1, 2010

Catholic Television Nigeria is a Catholic television network based in Abuja, Nigeria. It is intended to be used as a tool of evangelisation to deepen the faith of the Catholic faithful within and outside Nigeria.

Though yet to acquire a standard TV channel, the Catholic Television is expected to provide all the Catholics the opportunity to evangelise in the future, using the electronic media to reach families in their homes.

The Director of the Catholic Television Nigeria is Rev. Fr. Patrick Alumuku.

== Background ==
For decades, the Catholic Church in Nigeria has desired to reach out to its members and the vast, diverse population of over 170 million people in Nigeria, through the Television network, which is an irresistibly attractive and effective medium for evangelization. To actualize this desire, the Roman Catholic Archdiocese of Abuja and some dioceses within Nigeria have been producing and airing programmes on Federal, State and Private television stations to their local communities. However, the need for a national coverage of Church activities and evangelization of the population of Nigeria had not been achieved.

The quest and desire to utilize a television broadcast network nationwide, to promote and propagate Catholic programmes and activities, as well as build a better and godly society, received a happy and encouraging boost in 2009. It came through an invitation by the chairman/CEO of a private national television company DAAR Communications Plc, (operators of Africa Independent Television AIT), Chief Raymond Dokpesi to John Cardinal Onaiyekan Archbishop of the Catholic Archdiocese of Abuja, to use one of DAARSAT channels for evangelization.

As an immediate and short term response to the opportunity offered by DAARSAT, John Cardinal Onaiyekancharged the Communications Department of the Archdiocese to take up the offer and ensure that the Catholic Church had an effective presence on television. This project also received the approval of the Catholic Bishops' Conference of Nigeria (CBCN). This informed the establishment of a capital intensive yet highly desirous Communications Ministry through television: THE CATHOLIC TELEVISION OF NIGERIA (CTV). The project took off with the broadcast of a fifteen-minute devotional programme titled “A Light For The Nation” at 05.45am on January 1, 2010, on Africa Independent Television.

== Vision ==
The Vision of CTV is to create a world in which the love of God and love of neighbour reign supreme, through being the most powerful and effective Catholic media organization in Africa.

== Mission ==
The Mission is to promote evangelization through being the authentic source of information and education on Catholic faith, teachings and values for a godly society. CTV is dedicated to evangelization by communicating with conviction to the Catholic community and the wider society, through the use of Television, Radio and the Internet.

The Director of the CTV, Fr.Patrick Tor Alumuku said that the ultimate goal of the Catholic Television was to promote human dignity, love, respect and peace for all, especially in the wake of rising violence in the country. He explained that the Catholic Television Programming was not solely on religion but also on matters that positively shape other aspects of human life. The CTV project has been planned for implementation in stages towards the 24 hour broadcast target. Every stage depends on the financial support received from committed Catholics and friends of the Church since the CTV does not receive subvention from anywhere.

== Local funding Sources ==
The Abuja Archdiocesan community through parishes and individuals have since the inception of the CTV been assisting in the area of sustainability with respect to staff salaries, transport, tapes, batteries, microphones, computers, and so on. The CTV usually have an end of year fundraising event to help kick-start every new year.

== Programs of the CTV ==
The Programs of the Catholic Television Nigeria, include: “A Light For The Nation” and "Faith in Action". “A Light For The Nation” is a daily devotional programme which features reflections on diverse topics on Catholic faith and good living, by the Clergy, Religious and Laity from different dioceses in Nigeria. The Programme has been broadcast everyday on the national network of Africa Independent Television (AIT) without interruption from January 2010 to date. "A Light for the Nation" which is broadcast every day at 05.45 am on AIT has become a very popular day-starter for most viewers as indicated in the feedback. According to the director, "We began this in a very small way with a programme on African Independent Television (AIT), called Light for the Nation. It is a programme aimed at making our own contribution towards a brighter future for Nigeria. We also have another programme called Faith in Action. It tries to tell the message that whatever you do, you have done nothing unless you positively affect your brother".

== See also ==
- Catholic television
- Catholic television channels
- Catholic television networks
