= Diocese of Lokoja =

Roman Catholic diocese in Nigeria

Diocese of Lokoja Dioecesis Lokoianus

Location
- Country: Nigeria
- Territory: Kogi State
- Ecclesiastical province: Abuja
- Metropolitan: Abuja
- Coordinates: 7°48′08″N 6°44′34″E

Statistics
- Area: 24,750 km^{2} (9,560 sq mi)
- Population: Total; Catholics: (as of 2022); 3,759,750; 48,175 (1.3%)
- Parishes: 45

Information
- Denomination: Roman Catholic
- Rite: Latin Rite
- Established: July 6, 1964
- Cathedral: Immaculate Conception Cathedral in Lokoja
- Secular priests: 60

Current leadership
- Pope: Leo XIV
- Bishop: Martin Dada Abejide Olorunmolu

Map
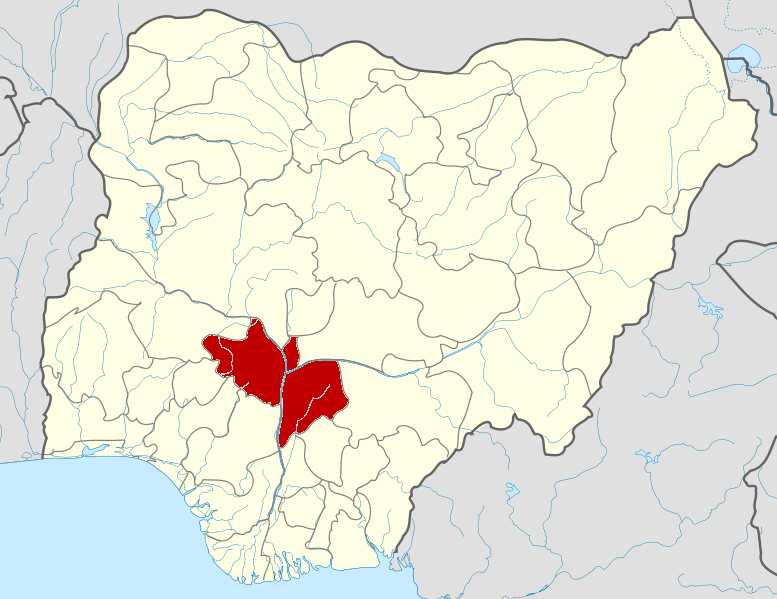
- Lokoja is located in Kogi State which is shown here in red.

Website
- http://catholicdioceseoflokoja.org.ng

The Roman Catholic Diocese of Lokoja (Latin: Lokoian(us)) is a diocese located in the city of Lokoja, Kogi State in the ecclesiastical province of Abuja in Nigeria.

== History ==
- February 21, 1955: Established as Apostolic Prefecture of Kabba from the Diocese of Benin City, Diocese of Kaduna and Apostolic Prefecture of Oturkpo
- July 6, 1964: Promoted as Diocese of Kabba
- May 5, 1965: Renamed as Diocese of Lokoja

While the advent of the Catholic Faith in the Catholic Diocese of Lokoja is usually dated to the opening of a new mission in Lokoja in 1884, the birth of the Ecclesiastical Jurisdiction, which we now call Lokoja Diocese must be dated back to 1955, when Kabba Prefecture was created, and later became Lokoja Diocese.

The creation of Kabba Prefecture resulted from a lengthy correspondence between the then Provincial and Superior-General of French-Canadian Spiritans (Canadian Spiritans). For at the end of the First World War German Missionaries were forced to leave the Cameroon, and the members of the French-Canadian Province of the Spiritans were asked to take over the German Mission in the Cameroon. Thus, the Cameroon became the field of work for the Canadian Spiritans until 1947 when their mission activity was shifted to Nigeria; in Nigeria they teamed up with their confreres from England under the authority of Father Francis Murray, the Administrator of the Prefecture of Benue until the arrival of Msgr. James Hagan as Prefect Apostolic.

In March 1955 the Prefecture of Kabba was created from Benin City Diocese and the Prefecture of Otukpo by the Vatican decree Number 1017 dated March 1, 1955; and Msgr Auguste Delisle, CSSp, a missionary since 1935 and on the Nigerian team since 1952 became the Prefect Apostolic by the Vatican decree number 2579 dated May 27, 1955. The new Prefecture was a suffragan of the Archdiocese of Onitsha. In terms of political pision Kabba Prefecture was coterminous with Kabba Province.

It was not until 1964 that the Prefecture of Kabba was raise to status of a Diocese by a Vatican decree dated July 6, 1964 with Msgr. A. Delisle as its first bishop; the name of the new diocese was Kabba and it remained a suffragan of Onitsha Archdiocese until ten weeks later when by a Vatican decree dated September 14, 1964 the Diocese of Kabba was made a suffragan of Kaduna. And by ye another Vatican decree number 1734 dated May 5, 1965 the Diocese of Kabba changed name to Diocese of Lokoja. According to Bishop Makozi,

The Prefecture of Kabba changed name briefly to Diocese of Kabba. To facilitate the administration of the diocese, the name was changed, of course with the approval of Rome, to Diocese of Lokoja, since the Kabba Provincial Headquarters was Lokoja where the Provincial Resident and his political administration resided.

A major pastoral progress was made when Idah Prefecture was created out of Lokoja Diocese with Msgr. Leopold Grimard as the Prefect Apostolic; the Prefecture was raised to the status of a diocese in 1978 with Bishop Ephraim S. Obot as its first bishop.

In 1971 the slow but sure process of indigenization of Kabba ecclesiastical jurisdiction that started with the priestly ordination of the duo of Alexius O. Makozi and Joseph Ohieku, assumed a far-reaching development when on May 30, 1971 was raised to the episcopate as auxiliary bishop of Lokoja; Bishop Makozi became the bishop of Lokoja in 1972. Thus Bishop A. Delisle was the local ordinary of Kabba\Lokoja ecclesiastical jurisdiction for about seventeen years (1955 – 1972).

Bishop A.O. Makozi administered the diocese of Lokoja as the local ordinary until 1992 when he was transferred to the diocese of Port Harcourt. Bishop Joseph Sunday Ajomo replaced Bishop Makozi on May 3, 1992 as the bishop of Lokoja until he joined the Church Triumphant on June 20, 2004. May he rest in peace.

Following the sudden death of Bishop Joseph Sunday Ajomo, Late Very Rev. Fr. Joseph Ohieku was appointed the Diocesan Administrator in accordance with the relevant canonical provisions. He was automatically relieved when the Bishop elect, Msgr. Martin Dada Abejide Olorunmolu (appointed November 11, 2005), was ordained and installed February 11, 2006 as the fourth bishop of the Catholic Diocese of Lokoja. (See http://catholicdioceseoflokoja.org.ng/history-of-lokoja-diocese/)

== Special churches ==
The Cathedral is Immaculate Conception Cathedral in Lokoja.

== Bishops ==
- Prefect Apostolic of Kabba (Roman rite)
  - Father Auguste Delisle, C.S.Sp. (27 May 1955 – 6 Jul 1964 see below)
- Bishop of Kabba (Roman rite)
  - Bishop Auguste Delisle, C.S.Sp. (see above 6 Jul 1964 – 5 May 1965 see below)
- Bishops of Lokoja (Roman rite)
  - Bishop Auguste Delisle, C.S.Sp. (see above 5 May 1965 – 30 Jul 1972)
  - Bishop Alexius Obabu Makozi (30 Jul 1972 – 31 Aug 1991), appointed Bishop of Port Harcourt
  - Bishop Joseph Sunday Ajomo (6 Mar 1992 – 21 Jun 2004)
  - Bishop Martin Dada Abejide Olorunmolu (since 11 Nov 2005)

=== Auxiliary Bishop ===
- Alexius Obabu Makozi (1971-1972), appointed Bishop here

=== Other priest of this diocese who became bishop ===
- John Olorunfemi Onaiyekan, appointed auxiliary bishop of Ilorin in 1982; future Cardinal

== See also ==
- Roman Catholicism in Nigeria

== Sources ==
- GCatholic.org Information
- Catholic Hierarchy
