= Leopold Grimard =

Roman Catholic clergyman

Leopold Grimard C.S.Sp.
- Prefect of Idah
- Church: Catholic Church
- See: Apostolic Prefecture of Idah
- In office: 4 October 1968 – 17 December 1977
- Predecessor: Prefecture erected
- Successor: Ephraim Obot

Orders
- Ordination: 18 September 1948 by Joseph Charbonneau

Personal details
- Born: 20 October 1920 St-Adrien de Ham, Quebec, Canada, British Empire
- Died: 31 May 1996 (aged 75) Limbour, Gatineau, Quebec, Canada

Leopold Grimard (born 20 October 1920 in St-Adrien de Ham – 31 May 1996 in Gatineau) was a Canadian clergyman and bishop for the Roman Catholic Diocese of Idah. He was appointed prefect in 1968. He died in 1996.
