= Obangogo Hills =

Hill and tourist attraction in Kabba, Nigeria

Obangogo Hill is a hill and popular tourist attraction located in Egunbe Community in Kabba, Kogi State of Nigeria. It is located about 5 kilometres (3.1 mi) from the Okene-Kabba expressway.

Local legend has it that the hill has played an important role in the history of the Kabba people who hid under its shade while escaping the slave raids of the Nupe Warriors who regularly invaded, about three hundred years ago. Obangogo "proved for them a place of refuge during this period in their history."

== UNESCO Heritage push ==
A group of prominent indigenes from the state, including advertising executive Steve Babaeko, have now started to push that the hill be recognized as a UNESCO Heritage Site.
