= Missionary Society of St. Paul =

The Missionary Society of St. Paul may refer to:

- Missionary Society of St Paul (Malta)
- Missionary Society of St Paul (Melkites)
- Missionary Society of Saint Paul of Nigeria
- Paulist Fathers
