= Martin Igwemezie Uzoukwu =

Nigerian bishop

- Bishop of Minna
- Church: Catholic Church
- Diocese: Diocese of Minna
- Appointed: 5 July 1996
- Predecessor: Christopher Shaman Abba

Orders
- Ordination: 27 September 1981 by William Mahony
- Consecration: 30 November 1996 by Carlo Maria Viganò

Personal details
- Born: 9 September 1950 (age 75) Ozubulu, Eastern Region, Colony and Protectorate of Nigeria, British Empire

Martin Igwemezie Uzoukwu (born 9 September 1950) is a Nigerian Catholic prelate who has served as the bishop of the Roman Catholic Diocese of Minna since 5 July 1996.

== Biography ==
Uzoukwu was ordained on 27 September 1981 for the Diocese of Ilorin. On 5 July 1996, he was appointed by Pope John Paul II as the bishop of Minna. He was consecrated by the then Apostolic nuncio to Nigeria, Archbishop Carlo Maria Viganò on 30 November of the same year.
