= Ayo-Maria Atoyebi =

Nigerian Catholic bishop (1944–2025)

The Most Reverend Ayo-Maria Atoyebi
- Bishop Emeritus of Ilorin
- Church: Roman Catholic Church
- Archdiocese: Ibadan
- Diocese: Ilorin
- Appointed: 6 March 1992
- Installed: 17 May 1992
- Term ended: 11 June 2019
- Predecessor: John Onaiyekan
- Successor: Paul Adegboyega Olawoore

Orders
- Ordination: 17 December 1978
- Consecration: 17 May 1992 by Peter Yariyok Jatau

Personal details
- Born: Ayo Sunday Atoyebi; 3 December 1944 Ilorin, Colony and Protectorate of Nigeria
- Died: 8 March 2025 (aged 80) Ibadan, Oyo State, Nigeria
- Parents: Atoyebi Methodius (father) and Aboyepe Teresa Adeoye (mother)

Ayo-Maria Atoyebi (3 December 1944 – 8 March 2025) was a Nigerian Bishop Emeritus of the Roman Catholic Church. He was born in Okerimi–Oro, now in Kwara state, Nigeria and was ordained a priest of Orders of Friars Preachers on 17 December 1978. He served as Bishop of Ilorin Diocese from 6 March 1992 to 11 June 2019.

== Priesthood and Episcopal appointment ==
Ayo-Maria Atoyebi was born on 3 December 1944. He was ordained a priest of the Roman Catholic Church under the Order of Friars Preacher on 17 December 1978.

On 6 March 1992, he was appointed the bishop of the Catholic Diocese of Ilorin after which he was consecrated as Bishop on 17 May 1992 by Bishop Peter Yariyok Jatau. His ordination was also carried out by co-consecrators which included: Bishop John Onaiyekan and Bishop Felix Alaba Adeosin Job. He was the bishop of Ilorin Diocese from 1992 to 2019.

== Marian activities ==
Bishop Atoyebi was a devotee of the Virgin Mary and promoter of Marian devotions and activities. He wrote many books and gave many talks on the blessed Virgin Mary. He started an annual Marian pilgrimage programme where Catholics in Ilorin Diocese visit the Blessed Virgin Mary pilgrimage site at Okerimi-Oro his hometown. He was also a member of the theological commission of the International Marian Association.

== Retirement and death ==
On 11 June 2019, Atoyebi retired as the bishop of the Roman Catholic Diocese of Ilorin due to old age and frail health and was replaced by His Coadjutor; Bishop Paul Adegboyega Olawoore. On 8 March 2025, Atoyebi died at the age of 80.

Catholic Church titles
Preceded by John Onaiyekan	Bishop of Ilorin; 1992–2019	Succeeded by Paul Adegboyega Olawoore
