= Illah Bunu =

- Settlement
- Location in Nigeria
- Coordinates: 8°5.7′N 6°4.8′E
- Country: Nigeria
- State: Kogi State
- Lga: Kabba/Bunu
- Time zone: UTC+1 (WAT)
- 3-digit postal code prefix: 261
- ISO 3166 code: NG.KO.KB

Illah Bunu is a town in Kogi State in mid west Nigeria. It is about 45 minutes drive from Kabba town in Kogi State. The town is near Aiyegunle Gbede

Coordinate: 8.094284,6.080761
