= Archdiocese of Abuja =

Roman Catholic archdiocese in Nigeria

Archdiocese of Abuja Archidioecesis Abugensis

Location
- Country: Nigeria
- Territory: Abuja, Federal Capital Territory
- Ecclesiastical province: Abuja
- Metropolitan: Abuja
- Deaneries: 6: Garki, Wuse, Bwari, Gwagwalada, Karu, Lugbe
- Coordinates: 9°4′0″N 7°29′0″E

Statistics
- Area: 8,000 km^{2} (3,100 sq mi)
- Population: Total; Catholics: (as of 2022); 4,589,950; 917,002 (20%)
- Parishes: 145
- Schools: 51

Information
- Denomination: Roman Catholic
- Rite: Latin Rite
- Established: 6 November 1981
- Cathedral: Our Lady Queen of Nigeria Pro-Cathedral
- Secular priests: 282

Current leadership
- Pope: Leo XIV
- Metropolitan Archbishop: Ignatius Ayau Kaigama
- Auxiliary Bishops: Anselm Umoren
- Vicar General: Innocent Jooji
- Bishops emeritus: John Onaiyekan

Map
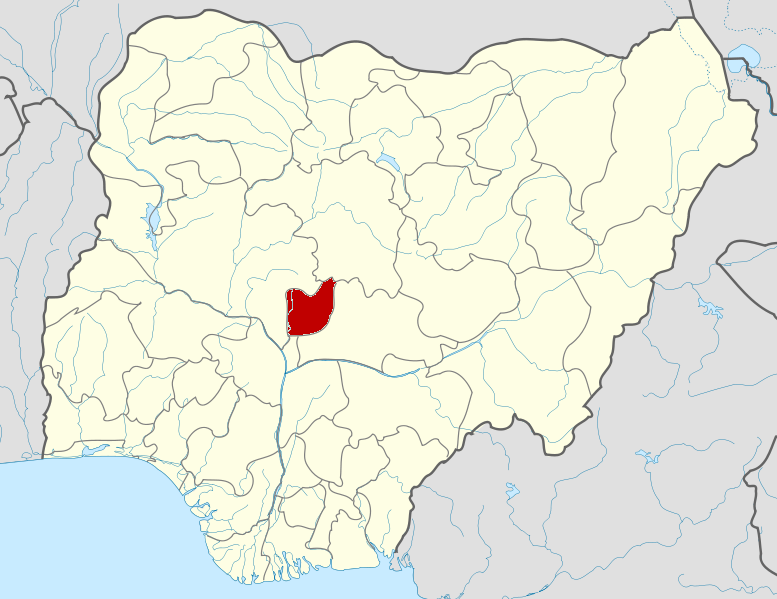
- Federal Capital Territory

Website
- catholicarchdioceseofabuja.org

The Roman Catholic Archdiocese of Abuja is the Metropolitan See for the ecclesiastical province of Abuja in Nigeria.

== History ==
- 8 November 1981: Established as Mission sui iuris of Abuja from the Diocese of Minna
- 19 June 1989: Promoted to the Diocese of Abuja
- 26 March 1994: Promoted to the Metropolitan Archdiocese of Abuja

== Special churches ==
The seat of the archbishop is Our Lady, Queen of Nigeria Pro-Cathedral located in Area 3, Garki district, in Abuja near the secretariate of the Archdiocese of Abuja. It was dedicated by John Cardinal Onaiyekan on Saturday, 12 January 2012.

== Bishops ==
=== Ecclesiastical superiors ===
- Cardinal Dominic Ignatius Ekandem (11 June 1981 – 19 June 1989 see below)

=== Bishops ===
- Cardinal Dominic Ignatius Ekandem (see above 19 June 1989 – 28 September 1992), simultaneously became archbishop (personal title)
- John Olorunfemi Onaiyekan (7 July 1990 as coadjutor, 28 September 1992 – 26 March 1994 see below); future cardinal

=== Metropolitan archbishops ===
- John Olorunfemi Onaiyekan (see above 26 March 1994 – 9 November 2019) (Cardinal in 2012)
- Ignatius Ayau Kaigama (11 March 2019 as coadjutor, 9 November 2019 – present)

=== Auxiliary bishop ===
- Anselm Umoren, M.S.P.N. (2011-)

== Suffragan dioceses ==
- Idah
- Lafia
- Lokoja
- Makurdi
- Otukpo
- Gboko; split from the Diocese of Makurdi on Saturday, 29 December 2012
- Katsina-Ala; split from the Diocese of Makurdi on Saturday, 29 December 2012

== Persecution and insecurity ==
From November 2020 through January 2021, a rash of kidnappings have troubled the archdiocesan territory and its surroundings. On 22 November, the parish priest of St. Anthony in Yangogi was abducted at gunpoint. Held captive for 10 days, he was released. 344 schoolboys were abducted from Kankara in Katsina. Held for six days, they were rescued by security forces on 17 December. Boko Haram claimed responsibility but this is disputed, says the Catholic News Agency. On 27 December, auxiliary bishop of Owerri, Moses Chikwe and his driver were abducted by gunmen, to be released unharmed. Valentine Ezeagu, a religious priest, was kidnapped by gunmen in Imo whilst en route to his father's funeral. Five young siblings were kidnapped from behind an Abuja rectory, and then a bride-to-be the following day, and as of 25 November 2020, none had been located or heard from. As of December 2020, Nigeria has been listed by the United States Department of State as one of the worst countries in terms of freedom of religion. Archbishop Ignatius Kaigama has called the faithful to be strong in their faith, and to persevere in their prayers with hope for everyone's release.

In August 2022 Archbishop Ignatius Kaigama denounced widespread insecurity in the capital of Nigeria and denouncing the political class for not doing enough about it. He accused politicians of discriminating against Christians. "We cannot generalize by simply saying that Christians are persecuted, because in the governing party there are Christians. But persecution is not just about killing people with knives, it is about manipulating things in favor of one group. There is subtle persecution, which is even more dangerous. It is done in such a way that you cannot say they are really killing Christians, they have not pushed the Christians away, but the way the Government carries on you can be sure the Christians are not favored. There is no equality. We are a country that is more or less 50-50 Cristian-Muslim, so there should be equal distribution of resources, of opportunities, and people should feel included in sensitive political, economic or security positions."

== Catholic television ==
In 2009, John Cardinal Onaiyekan was invited by Raymond Dokpesi, chief of the satellite television company DAAR Communications Plc, to offer programming through the company's services. In response to the opportunity, Cardinal Oneiyaken directed the Archdiocesan Communications Department to start a television service. Catholic Television of Nigeria started producing programs and transmitting them via DAAR's satellite television channel AIT.

As of 2016, CTV of Nigeria produces two programs, the daily morning devotional program "A Light for the Nation" and "Faith in Action", a program about the activity of Catholics and the Church in society.

Cardinal Oneiyaken has continued to call for the building of Catholic television services in Nigeria.

Rev. Fr. Patrick Alumuku is the Director of the CTV.

== See also ==
- Roman Catholicism in Nigeria
- List of Roman Catholic dioceses in Nigeria

== Sources ==
- GCatholic.org
- Catholic-Hierarchy.org/diocese/dabuj
