= Michael Olobayo =

Nigerian statesman and politician (1945–2016)

- Born: Oba Michael Folorunsho Segun Olobayo; 4 March 1945; Kabba, Nigeria (now Kogi State, Nigeria)
- Died: 15 May 2016 (aged 71); Nigeria
- Occupation: Oboro of Kabba

Oba Michael Folorunsho Segun Olobayo (4 March 1945 – 15 May 2016) was a Nigerian statesman.

Olobayo was born to the Ajinuhi Royal House of the Ilajo clan on 4 March 1945. Oba Michael Olobayo was the Chairman of Okun Area Traditional Council.

Olobayo died on 15 May 2016, after a brief illness.
