= Joseph Egerega =

Joseph Oforishe Egerega
- Vicar Apostolic of Bomodi
- Church: Catholic Church
- See: Apostolic Vicariate of Bomadi
- In office: 3 March 1997 – 4 April 2009
- Predecessor: Thomas Vincent Greenan
- Successor: Hyacinth Oroko Egbebo
- Other post: Titular Bishop of Tanudaia (1997-2013)

Orders
- Ordination: 21 December 1969
- Consecration: 14 May 1997 by Jozef Tomko

Personal details
- Born: 20 March 1940 Eboh Orogun (south of Abraka), Warri Province, Colony and Protectorate of Nigeria, British Empire
- Died: 3 February 2013 (aged 72)

Joseph Egerega (20 March 1940 – 3 February 2013) was the Catholic bishop of the Vicariate Apostolic of Bomadi, Nigeria.

Ordained to the priesthood in 1969, Egerega was named bishop in 1997 and resigned in 2009.
