= Paul Adegboyega Olawoore =

Nigerian bishop (1961–2022)

- Bishop of Ilorin
- Church: Catholic Church
- Diocese: Diocese of Ilorin
- In office: 11 June 2019 – 1 January 2022
- Predecessor: Ayo-Maria Atoyebi
- Successor: Anselm Pendo Lawani
- Previous post: Coadjutor Bishop of Ilorin (2018-2019)

Orders
- Ordination: 3 October 1992 by Julius Babatunde Adelakun
- Consecration: 13 July 2018 by Ayo-Maria Atoyebi

Personal details
- Born: 30 November 1961 Ikuri, Western Region, Federation of Nigeria
- Died: 1 January 2022 (aged 60) Ilorin, Kwara State, Nigeria
- Motto: Thy Will Be Done, Oh Lord

Paul Adegboyega Olawoore

Bishop of the Roman Catholic Diocese of Ilorin
- In office 2019 – January 1, 2022
- Preceded by: Ayo-Maria Atoyebi
- Succeeded by: Anselm Pendo Lawani

Coadjutor Bishop of the Roman Catholic Diocese of Ilorin
- In office 2018–2019
- Preceded by: Unknown
- Succeeded by: Vacant

Personal details
- Born: November 30, 1961 Ikuri, Nigeria
- Died: January 1, 2022 (aged 60) Ilorin, Nigeria

Paul Adegboyega Olawoore (Ikuri, Nigeria, 30 November 1961 – Ilorin, 1 January 2022) was a Nigerian Roman Catholic prelate. He was bishop of the Roman Catholic Diocese of Ilorin from 2019 until his death on New Year's Day, at the age of 60.
