= San Saturnino =

- Church of Saint Saturninus
- San Saturnino Martire
- Chiesa di Santa Saturnino
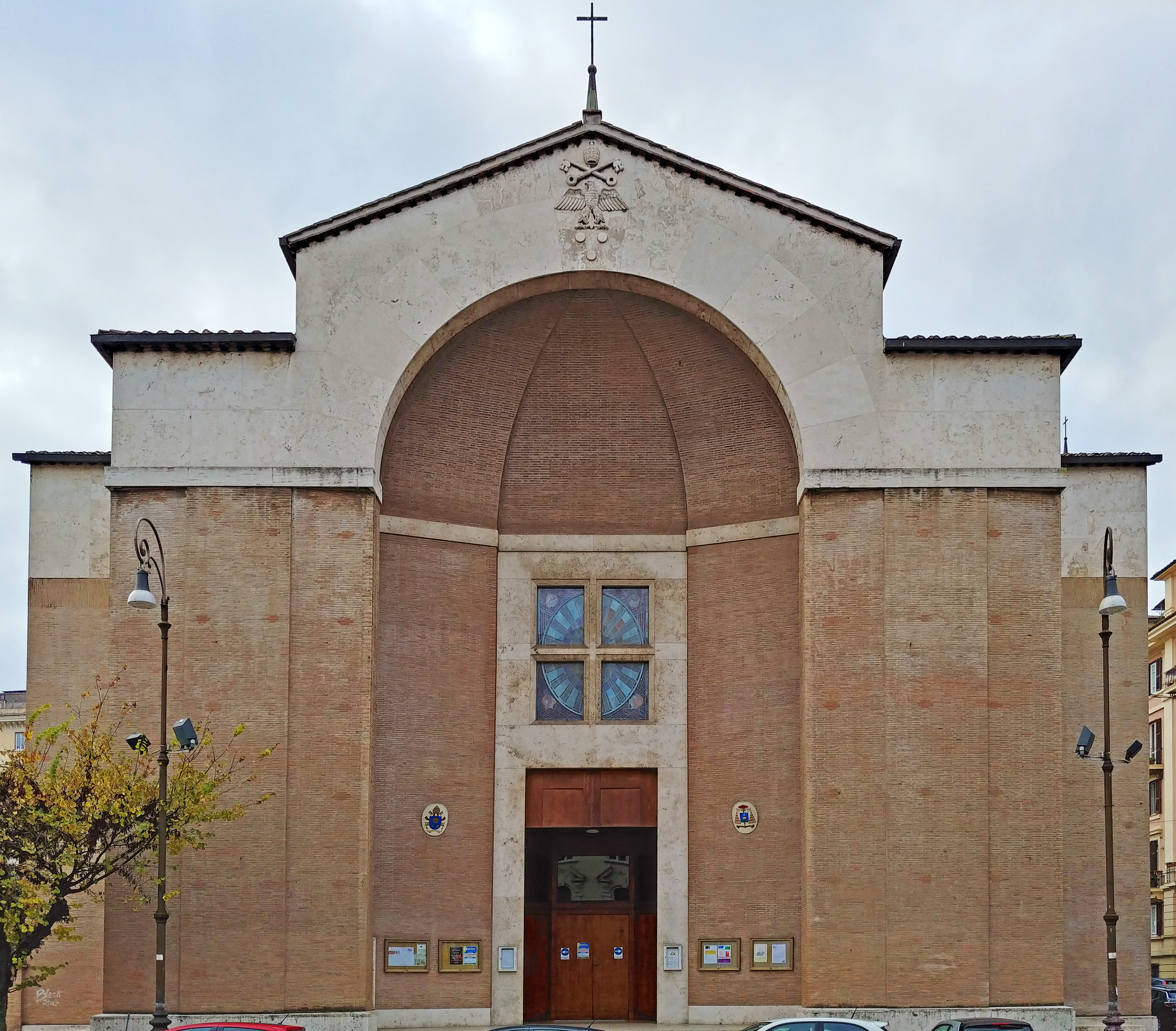
- Facade
- Click on the map for a fullscreen view
- 41°55′21″N 12°30′28″E
- Location: Via Avigliana 3, Q. Trieste, Rome
- Country: Italy
- Language: Italian
- Denomination: Catholic
- Tradition: Roman Rite
- Website: sansaturninomartire.it

History
- Status: titular church
- Dedication: Saturninus of Carthage
- Consecrated: 1940

Architecture
- Architect: Clemente Busiri Vici
- Architectural type: Romanesque Revival
- Groundbreaking: 1935
- Completed: 1940

Administration
- Diocese: Rome

San Saturnino is a 20th-century parochial church and titular church in northern Rome, dedicated to Saturninus of Carthage (died on the Via Salaria in AD 304).

== History ==
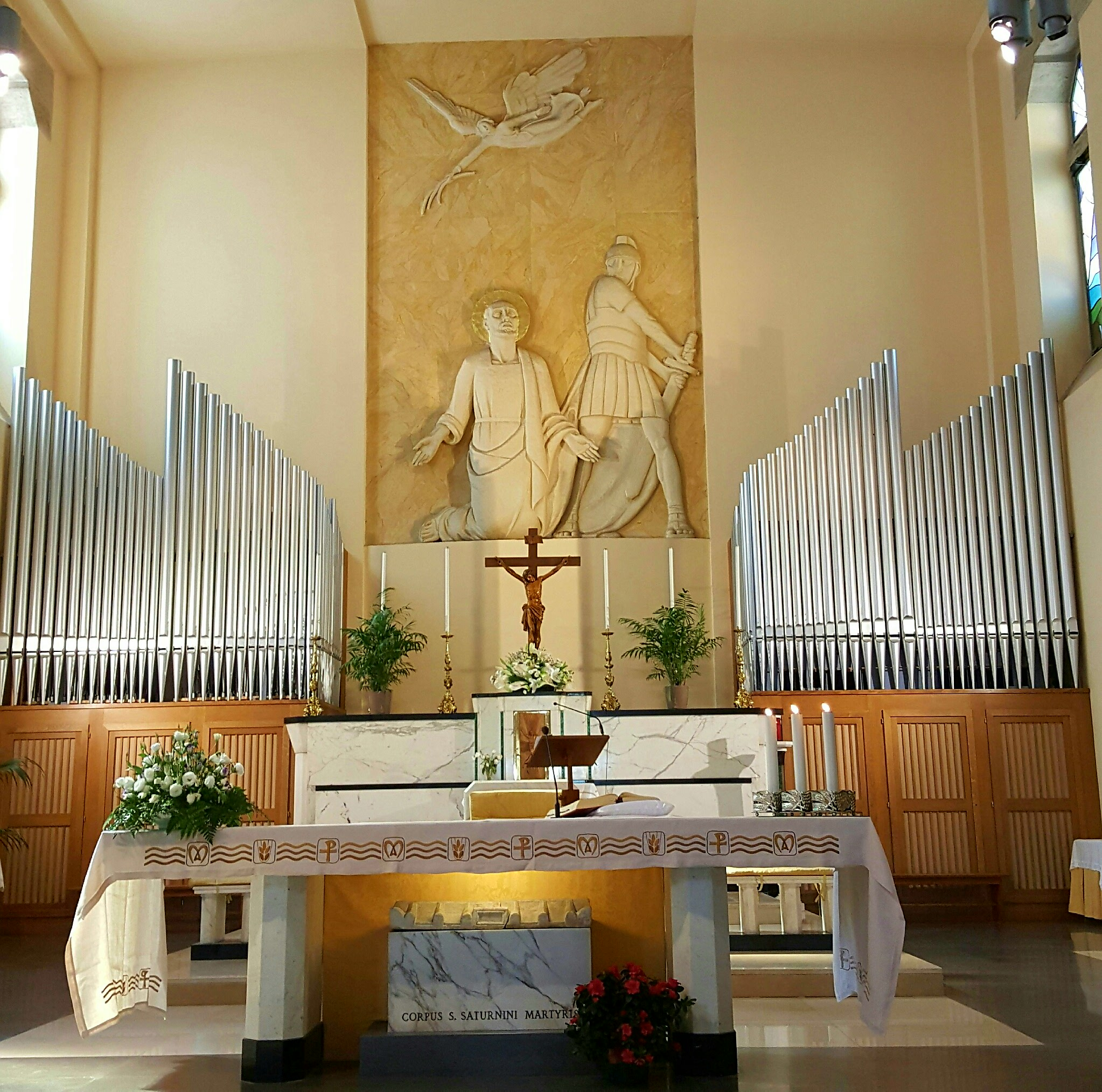
Altar of Saint Saturninus

The church was built in 1935–1940. The relics of Saint Saturninus are interred under the high altar.

On 21 October 2003, it was made a titular church to be held by a cardinal-priest.

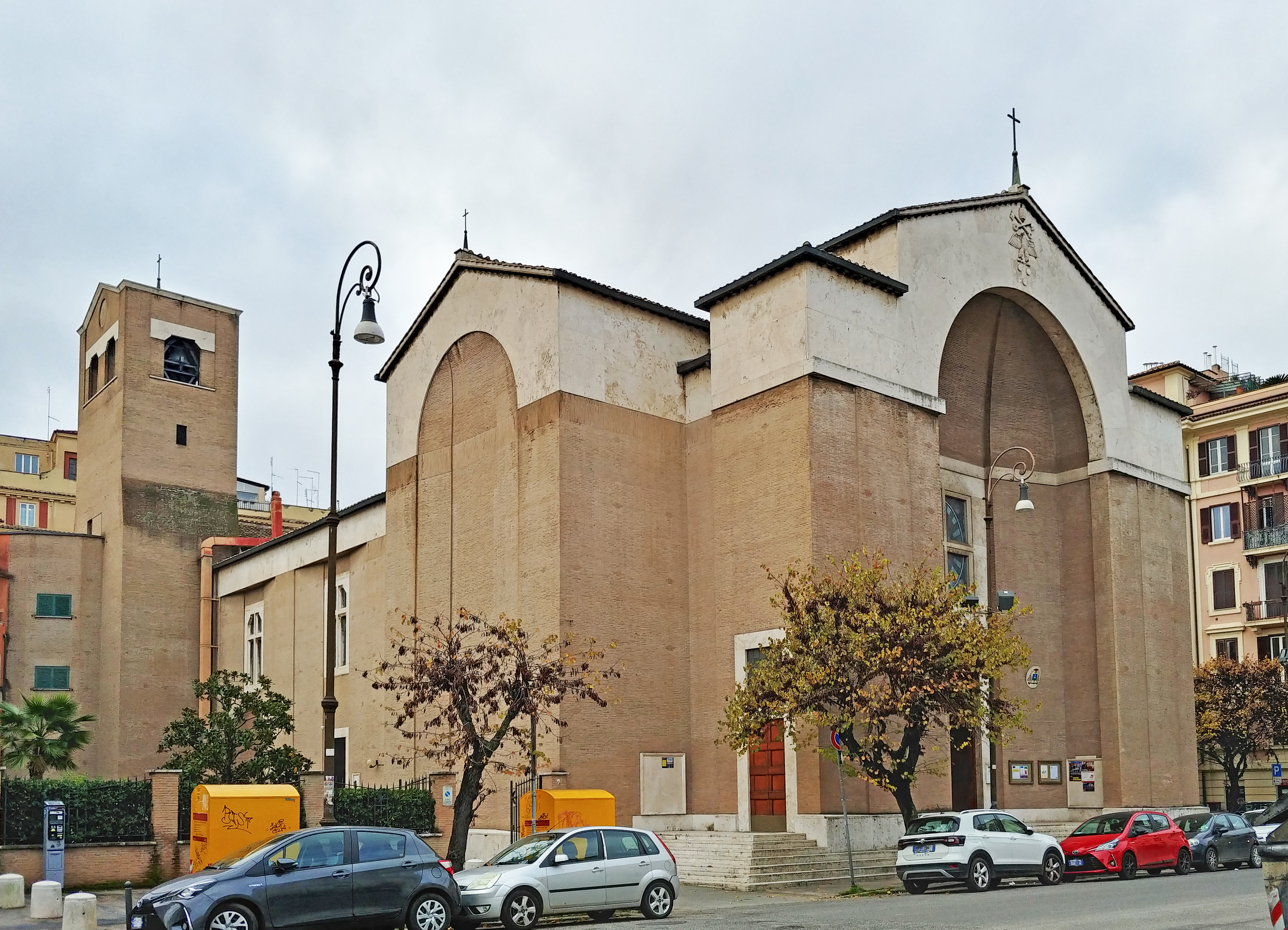
Oblique view

Cardinal-protectors

- Rodolfo Quezada Toruño (2003–2012)
- John Onaiyekan (2012–present)
