= Missionary Society of St. Paul of Nigeria =

Roman Catholic congregation

- Abbreviation: MSP
- Founder: Dominic Cardinal Ekandem
- Founded at: Nigeria
- Type: Clerical Religious Congregation of Diocesan Right (for Men)
- Headquarters: Plot 431/432 Jeremiah Useni Road, Kutunku, Gwagwalada - Abuja
- Region served: Africa, North America, Europe and Caribbean
- Members: 290 as of 2021
- Superior General: Rev. Fr. Callistus Isara, MSP
- Ministry: Primary Evangelisation, Apostolate of the Pen, Conflict Resolution and Reconciliation, School and Hospital chaplaincy apostolates, etc.
- Website: mspfathers.org

The Missionary Society of St. Paul of Nigeria is a Catholic religious congregation based in Nigeria and serving parishes in Africa, North America, Europe, and the Caribbean. It was founded by Cardinal Dominic Ekandem in 1976.

== History ==
The Catholic Bishops' Conference of Nigeria decided to establish the National Missionary Seminary of St Paul, founded by Dominic Cardinal Ekandem, who had first proposed it in 1950, at its meeting in Kaduna in September 1976. Pope Paul VI in 1969 had called for Africans to be missionaries to themselves in Kampala, Uganda. For the institution to take off, Anthony Sanusi, bishop of Ijebu Ode Diocese, donated the premises of the former St Mark’s Teacher Training College at Iperu Remo, Ogun State to be used as its first home. On Mission Sunday, October 23, 1977, the seminary was opened on its temporary site in Iperu Remo. Priests of St Patrick Society of Ireland were invited to assist in the formation program of the seminary.

In February 1978, the Catholic Bishops' Conference unanimously erected the Missionary Society of St Paul of Nigeria into a Pious Union, which was approved by the Congregation for the Evangelisation of Peoples in October 1978 (Prot. 4652/78). The Vicar General of Calabar Diocese, Godwin Akpan, became the first Rector of the Seminary (1977-1988), and later the first Acting Superior General of the Society (1988-1995).

On October 13, 1984, a new permanent site of the seminary campus was opened in Gwagwalada, Abuja, for the study of Philosophy and Theology, and the Iperu campus remained the two-year spiritual Formation House. The headquarters of the Society was moved to Abuja as well. The first member of the Society trained in the seminary, Fr John Osom, MSP was ordained on June 22, 1985, and eleven other members were ordained the next year. Since then, priestly ordinations have become a yearly event in the Society.

The words of St Paul "we are ambassadors for Christ" (2Cor 5, 20) are the Society's motto. Its members take on missionary activities to all nations. Though primary evangelisation is its central mission, the Society is also committed to the apostolate of new evangelisation and the printed word. The close partners of the priest members of the Society are the Associate Missionaries of St Paul, lay faithful who support the work of the Society.

In 1986, members of the Society were sent on foreign missions for the first time to Cameroon, Liberia and the United States of America. Since then, in addition to these countries and Nigeria, members of the Society work in Botswana, the Gambia, Malawi, Chad, South Africa, South Sudan, Kenya, Central Africa Republic, the Bahamas, Canada, the United Kingdom, Ireland, Italy, Sweden, and Grenada.

On March 17, 1994, the Congregation of the Propagation of the Faith gave approval for the canonical erection of the Society as a Society of Apostolic Life of Diocesan Right. The erection was officially done and approval of the Constitutions given by the Ordinary of the Society, John Onaiyekan, on April 16, 1995. Within the same year, the first General Chapter of the Society witnessed the election of Felix Elosi, MSP as its first Superior General. The Society has held four other successful General Chapters in 2001, 2007, 2013 and 2019 and an extraordinary Chapter in 2008. These General Chapters produced Hyacinth Egbebo, MSP, Anselm Umoren, MSP, Victor Onwukeme, MSP, and Callistus Isara, MSP, as Superiors General. Three members of the Society are now bishops in Nigeria: Anthony Adaji, MSP of Idah Diocese (2007), Hyacinth Egbebo, MSP of Bomadi Diocese (2008) and Anselm Umoren, MSP Auxiliary Bishop of Abuja Archdiocese (2012).

As at 2021, the Society had recorded the ordination of 320 priests, 2 deacons and 1 incardinations. The Society grew into the first Missionary Institute of Apostolic life in Africa.

== Superiors general ==
- Felix Elosi (1995 – 2001)
- Hyacinth Oroko Egbebo (2001 – 23 November 2007), later bishop, see below
- Anselm Umoren (2008 – 8 November 2011), later bishop, see below
- Victor Chike Onwukeme (12 September 2013 – 2019)
- Callistus Isara (2019 – )

== Prelates from their ranks ==
- Anthony Ademu Adaji, Bishop of Idah (Nigeria)
- Hyacinth Oroko Egbebo, Bishop of Bomadi
- Anselm Umoren, Titular Bishop of Scampa and Auxiliary Bishop of Abuja (Nigeria)
