= Our Lady Queen of Nigeria Pro-Cathedral, Abuja =

Coordinates: 9.0294°N 7.4830°E

Our Lady Queen of Nigeria Pro-Cathedral
- Our Lady Queen of Nigeria Pro-Cathedral
- Location: Abuja
- Country: Nigeria
- Denomination: Roman Catholic Church

Administration
- Archdiocese: Roman Catholic Archdiocese of Abuja

The Our Lady Queen of Nigeria Pro-Cathedral, also called Abuja Cathedral, is the pro-cathedral of the Roman Catholic Archdiocese of Abuja, the capital of Nigeria. Located on the Funmilayo Kuti street in Garki, is expected to be replaced by the city's Cathedral of the Twelve Apostles upon its completion.

Initially it was called "Church of All Saints" and had its first priest in 1983.

The cathedral parish follows the Latin Rite. It serves as the mother church of the archdiocese (Archidioecesis Abugensis), which was created as a mission sui juris in 1981 and elevated to archiepiscopal status in 1994 via the bull "Quo aptius" of Pope John Paul II.

It is under the pastoral responsibility of Archbishop Ignatius Kaigama. Pope John Paul II visited it in 1988, as did President of Nigeria, Goodluck Jonathan, in 2015.

== See also ==
- Cathedral of the Holy Cross, Lagos
- List of cathedrals in Nigeria
- Roman Catholicism in Nigeria
