= Saturninus of Carthage =

North African Christian martyr

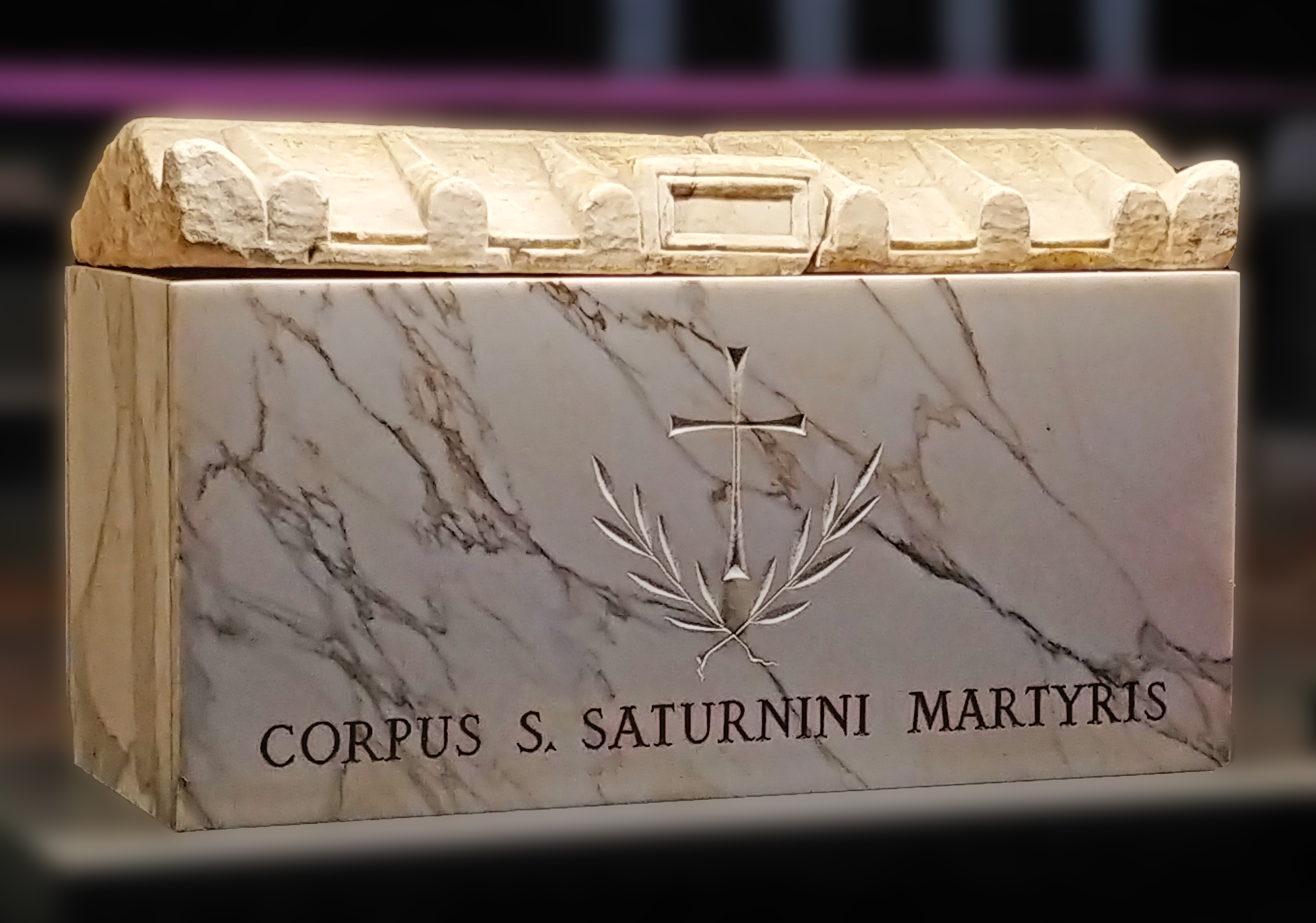
Sarcophagus of the saint under the high altar of San Saturnino church in Rome.

Saturninus of Carthage was a North African Christian martyr killed by Maximian in 304 after being exiled to Rome during the Decian persecution, as stated in an inscription dedicated to him by Pope Damasus I.

He was buried in the Catacomb of Trasone on the via Salaria. Filocalus's Chronograph of 354 records his burial there on 29 November. His body was later translated to San Saturnino church in Rome.

The Roman Martyrology states that he:

under the emperor Decius was tortured for his faith on the rack in his homeland and then exiled to Rome, where, after overcoming other atrocious tortures, he converted the tyrant Gratian to the faith and finally was beheaded and obtained the crown of martyrdom.
