= Anthony Adaji =

Catholic bishop of Idah Diocese

Anthony Ademu Adaji M.S.P.N.
- Bishop of Idah
- Church: Catholic Church
- Diocese: Diocese of Idah
- Appointed: 1 June 2009
- Predecessor: Ephraim Obot
- Previous posts: Titular Bishop of Turuda (2007-2009); Auxiliary Bishop of Idah (2007-2009)

Orders
- Ordination: 1 July 1995
- Consecration: 22 September 2007 by Renzo Fratini

Personal details
- Born: 13 October 1964 (age 61) Ukpaba (in present-day Ankpa LGA), Northern Region, Federal Republic of Nigeria

Anthony Ademu Adaji (born 13 October 1964) is a Catholic prelate and bishop of Idah Diocese, located in the ecclesiastical province of Abuja, in Nigeria.

== Career ==
He was ordained a priest on 1 July 1995 into the Missionary Society of Saint Paul (MSP) congregation. On 1 June 2009, Pope Benedict XVI appointed Adaji Auxiliary bishop of Idah Diocese serving alongside Bishop Ephraim Silas Obot – the first bishop of the diocese who was advanced in age and with health complications. Adaji was ordained as an auxiliary bishop on 22 September 2009 and later received his episcopal installation as full bishop following the death of bishop Obot.
