= Durosimi Meseko =

Nigerian politician

Durosinmi Meseko is a Nigerian politician from Kogi State, born in May 1966. He represented the Kabba/Bunu Federal Constituency in the National Assembly, serving as a member of the Peoples Democratic Party (PDP) from 2003 to 2007.
