= Christ the King Cathedral, Gitega =

Coordinates: 3.4402°S 29.9330°E

Christ the King Cathedral
- Cathédrale du Christ-Roi de Gitega
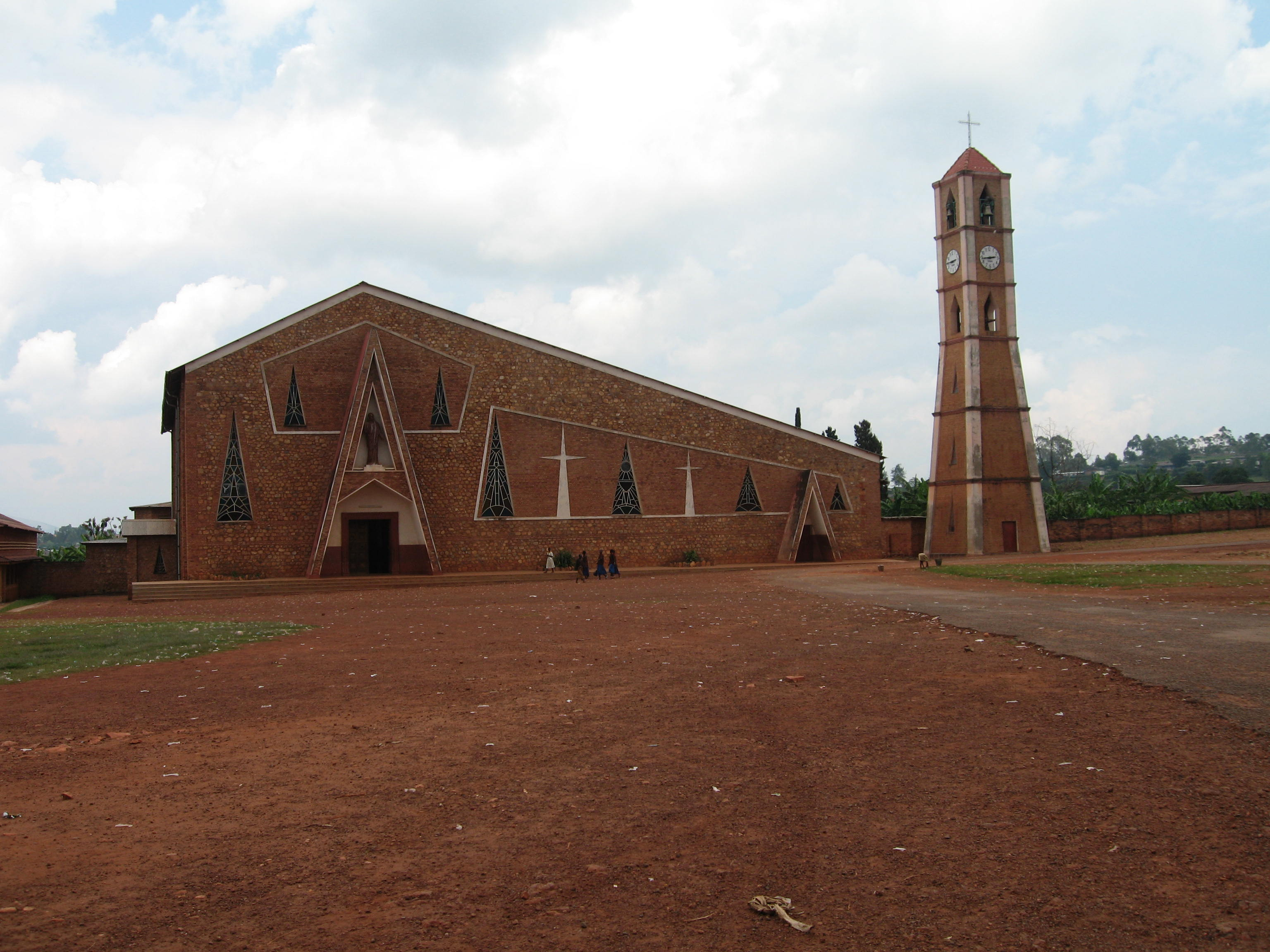
- Christ the King Cathedral
- Location: Gitega
- Country: Burundi
- Denomination: Roman Catholic Church

The Christ the King Cathedral (French: Cathédrale du Christ-Roi de Gitega) is a religious building belonging to the Catholic Church and is located in Gitega in the province of Gitega in the central part of Burundi.

Follow the Latin or Roman rite and functions as the headquarters of the Metropolitan Archdiocese of Gitega (Latin: Archidioecesis Kitegaensis) that was created on November 10, 1959 by the Bull "Cum parvulum" by the Pope John XXIII as part of the ecclesiastical province of Gitega.

Pope John Paul II visited the September 5, 1990 as part of his tour of several African countries. It is under the pastoral responsibility of Archbishop Simon Ntamwana.

== See also ==
- Roman Catholicism in Burundi
- Christ the King Cathedral (disambiguation)
