= Catacomb of Trasone =

Catacomb in Rome, Italy

Coordinates: 41.9203°N 12.4990°E

The Catacomb of Trasone is a catacomb on the left side of the ancient via Salaria, at its junction with via Yser, in the modern-day Parioli quarter of Rome. Begun in the 3rd century, is named after Trason or Thrason, a rich Christian Roman citizen under Diocletian and the owner of the land in which it was dug - he is named in a martyrdom account of Susanna of Rome. Ancient sources also call it Coemeterium Thrasonis ad s. Saturninum (the cemetery of Thrason at [the basilica of] saint Saturninus in memory of the main martyr buried there, the remains of whose above-ground basilica were still visible late in the 16th century.

== Martyrs ==
The most famous saint buried here was Saturninus of Carthage - the Chronograph of 354, in its entry for 29 November, records that he was buried in "the Trason" cemetery on the via Salaria. Originating in Carthage, he was exiled to Rome during the Decian Persecution and died during persecution by Valerian.

The late 7th century pilgrims' itinerary De locis sanctis martyrum quae sunt foris civitatis Romae states that the catacomb contained the bodies of 72 martyrs, whilst the 12 August entry in the 5th century Martyrologium Hieronymianum states that Chrysanthus and Daria were buried in it. No trace of these saints has been found in the catacomb.

== History ==
It originated as a sandstone quarry transformed into a burial place in the 3rd century: from this quarry five levels of galleries branched out (it is one of Rome's deepest catacombs), extending almost completely under the current Villa Grazioli and its park, while a skylight is visible in the courtyard of the Royal Palace of Villa Ada. A basilica to Saint Saturninus was built above ground, as is mentioned in the life of Pope Felix IV in the Liber Pontificalis, stating that he restored its foundations. It was also restored by Pope Adrian I and Pope Gregory IV. The Notitia ecclesiarum urbis Romae and other pilgrims' itineraries mention an underground basilica dedicated to Chysanthus and Daria.

It was first rediscovered late in the 16th century by Antonio Bosio who in the remains of the above-ground basilica (then known as the basilica of Saint Citonina) discovered a now-lost passage leading to the underground galleries. This was discovered again in 1629 by Torrigio, but it was devastated by relic-hunters in the 17th and 18th centuries. It was excavated from 1966 onwards.

== Description ==
The current manhole entrance leads down to the first level. The second level was the former quarry, from which one descends to the lower levels.

On the fourth level are two frescoes which allow the complex to be dated, one showing Moses striking the rock to make water flow and the other showing two scenes from the Book of Jonah. They can be dated to the late 3rd or early 4th century, whilst an inscription dedicated to a Severa can be dated to 269.

== Bibliography (in Italian) ==
- Leonella De Santis; Giuseppe Biamonte (1997). Le catacombe di Roma. Roma: Newton Compton Editori. pp. 170–172.
- Pasquale Testini, Archeologia Cristiana, Edipuglia, 1980, p. 251
