= Auguste Delisle =

Canadian Catholic priest, missionary

Auguste Delisle C.S.Sp.
- Bishop of Lokoja
- Church: Catholic Church
- Diocese: Diocese of Lokoja
- In office: 27 May 1955 – 30 July 1972
- Predecessor: Prefecture established
- Successor: Alexius Obabu Makozi

Orders
- Ordination: 17 June 1934 by Francesco Marchetti Selvaggiani
- Consecration: 24 August 1964 by Sergio Pignedoli

Personal details
- Born: 7 July 1908 Montreal, Quebec, Dominion of Canada, British Empire
- Died: 13 November 2006 (aged 98)

Auguste Delisle (7 July 1908 – 13 November 2006) was a Canadian clergyman and bishop for the Roman Catholic Diocese of Lokoja. He was appointed bishop in 1955. He was born in 1908 in Montreal, Quebec, and died in 2006.
