= Christ the King Cathedral =

Christ the King Cathedral or Cathedral of Christ the King may refer to one of the following cathedrals:

== Roman Catholic ==
=== Botswana ===
- Christ the King Cathedral (Gaborone)

=== Brazil ===
- Christ the King Cathedral, Belo Horizonte

=== Burundi ===
- Christ the King Cathedral, Gitega

=== Canada ===
- Cathedral Basilica of Christ the King, Hamilton, Ontario
- Christ the King Cathedral (Gaspé), Quebec

=== China ===
- Cathedral Church of Christ the King, Qingzhou, in the Roman Catholic Diocese of Weifang

=== India ===
- Christ the King Cathedral, Balasore, in the Roman Catholic Diocese of Balasore
- Christ the King Co-Cathedral, in the Roman Catholic Diocese of Simla and Chandigarh
- Christ the King Cathedral, Aizawl, in the Roman Catholic Diocese of Aizawl
- Christ the King Cathedral, Kottayam, in the Syro-Malabar Catholic Archeparchy of Kottayam
- Kristuraja Cathedral, in the Syro-Malabar Catholic Eparchy of Faridabad
- Christ the King Cathedral, Marthandom, in the Syro-Malankara Catholic Eparchy of Marthandom

=== Iceland ===
- Christ the King Cathedral (Reykjavík)

=== Ireland ===
- Christ the King Cathedral, Mullingar, in County Westmeath

=== Japan ===
- Christ the King Cathedral, Niigata

=== Lithuania ===
- Panevėžys Cathedral of Christ the King

=== Nigeria ===
- Christ the King Cathedral, Aba

=== Poland ===
- Cathedral of Christ the King, Katowice

=== Serbia ===
- Co-cathedral of Christ the King, Belgrade

=== South Africa ===
- Cathedral of Christ The King, Johannesburg

=== United Kingdom ===
- Liverpool Metropolitan Cathedral of Christ the King, in Liverpool, England

=== United States ===
- Cathedral of Christ the King (Atlanta), Georgia
- Cathedral of Christ the King (Lexington, Kentucky)
- Cathedral of Christ the King (Lubbock, Texas)
- Cathedral of Christ the King (Superior, Wisconsin)

=== Vietnam ===
- Christ the King Cathedral, Nha Trang

== Anglican ==
- Christ Church Cathedral in Grafton, Clarence Valley Council, New South Wales, Australia
- Christ the King Cathedral, in the Anglican Diocese of Ballarat, Victoria, Australia
- Cathedral of Christ the King, Kurunegala, in Sri Lanka
- Cathedral of Christ the King, Kalamazoo, in Michigan, United States

== Other denominations ==
- Christ the King Cathedral, Kottayam, India; see Syro-Malabar Catholic Archeparchy of Kottayam § Kottayam Diocese
