= Christ the King Cathedral, Niigata =

Christ the King Cathedral
- 王であるキリスト司教座聖堂
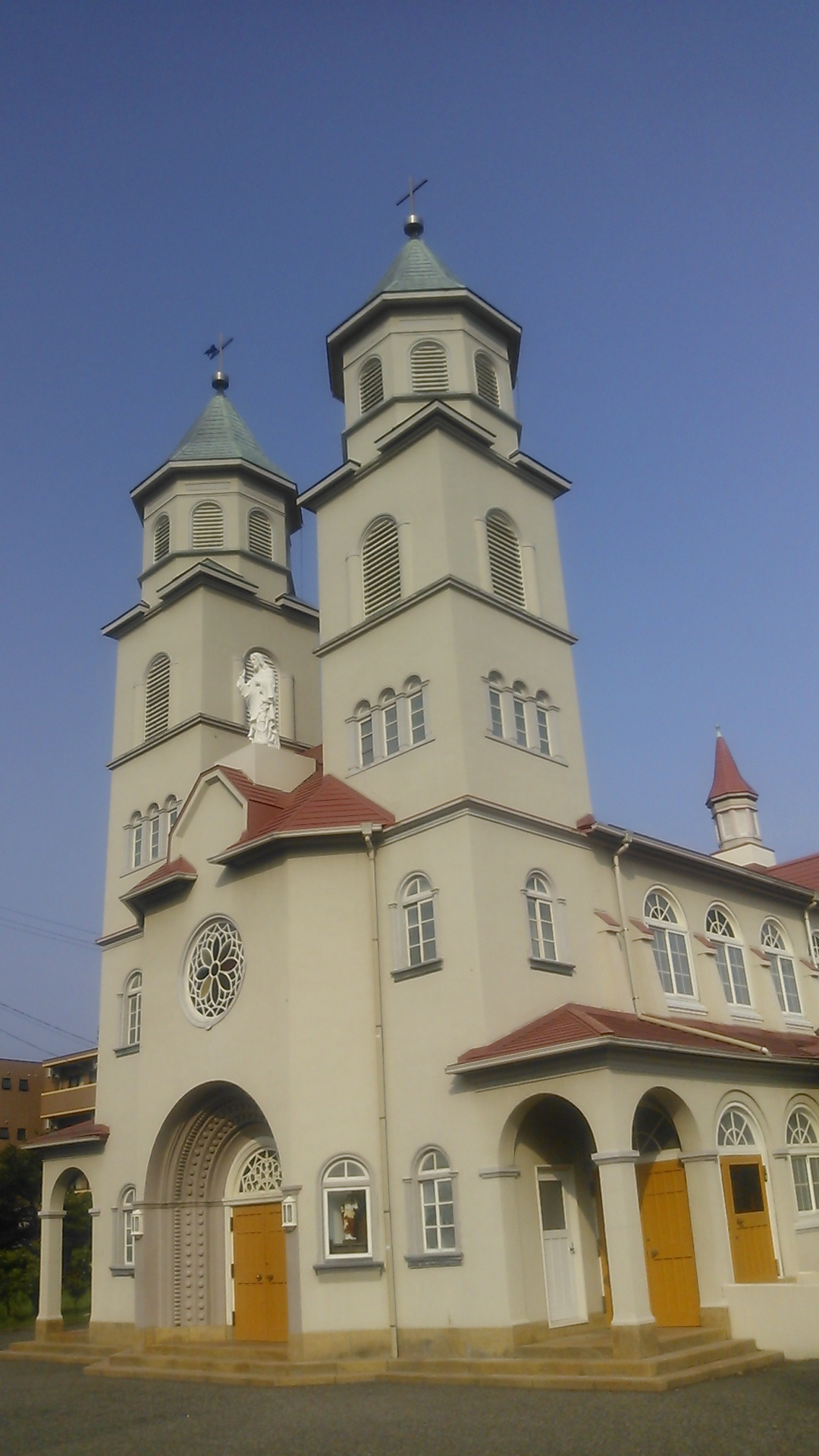
- Christ the King Cathedral
- 37°55′30″N 139°02′19″E
- Location: Niigata
- Country: Japan
- Denomination: Roman Catholic Church
- Website: https://cathedral-niigata.jp/

The Christ the King Cathedral (Japanese: 王であるキリスト司教座聖堂) also called Niigata Church is a religious building that is affiliated with the Catholic Church and is located in the city of Niigata in the prefecture of the same name, in Japan.

The church was dedicated in 1927. It follows the Roman or Latin rite and is the principal church of the diocese of Niigata (Dioecesis Niigataënsis カトリック新潟教区) which was raised to its current status by Pope John XXIII by the Bull "Sicut provido" in 1962.

It is under the pastoral responsibility of the Bishop Tarcisius Isao Kikuchi.

== See also ==
- Roman Catholicism in Japan
- Christ the King Cathedral
