= Lacubaza =

Africa Proconsularis (125 AD)

Lacubaza was a civitas in the Roman province of Africa Proconsularis. The exact location of the town is unknown, though it is believed to have been situated in northern Tunisia.

Lacubaza was the seat of an ancient Christian bishopric, a suffragan of the Archdiocese of Carthage. The only documented bishop is Vindicianus, who took part in the council held at Carthage called in 349 by the Metropolitan bishop, Grato.

The Diocese of Lacubaza is now a titular bishopric of the Roman Catholic Church. Its current bishop is Hyacinth Oroko Egbebo, apostolic vicar of Bomadi.
