= Diocese of Ilorin =

Roman Catholic diocese in Nigeria

Diocese of Ilorin Dioecesis Ilorinensis

Location
- Country: Nigeria
- Territory: Kwara State
- Ecclesiastical province: Ibadan
- Metropolitan: Ibadan
- Coordinates: 8°30′00″N 4°33′00″E

Statistics
- Area: 32,500 km^{2} (12,500 sq mi)
- Population: Total; Catholics: (as of 2022); 2,613,000; 25,750 (1.0%)
- Parishes: 44

Information
- Denomination: Roman Catholic
- Rite: Latin Rite
- Established: May 29, 1969
- Cathedral: Saint Joseph Cathedral in Ilorin
- Secular priests: 58

Current leadership
- Pope: Leo XIV
- Bishop: Anselm Pendo Lawani

Map
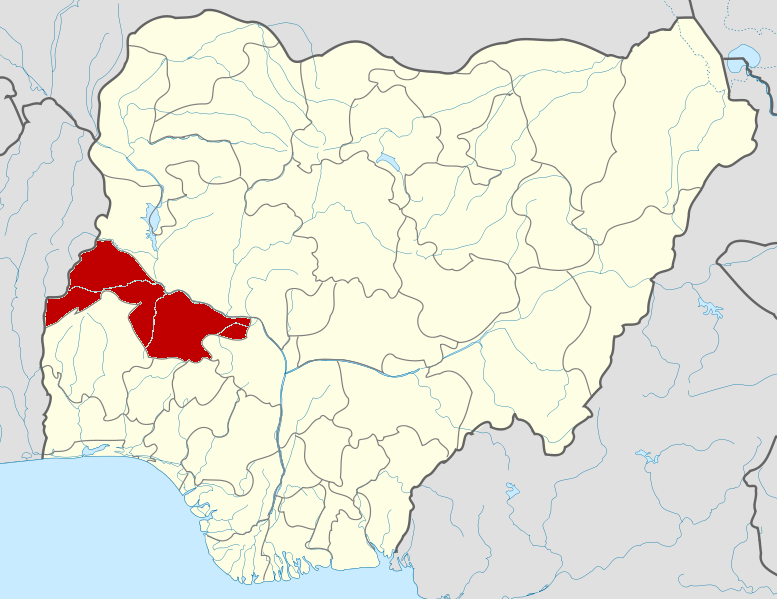
- Ilorin is located in Kwara State which is shown here in red.

Website
- http://www.catholicdioceseofilorin.org/

The Roman Catholic Diocese of Ilorin (Latin: Ilorinen(sis)) is a diocese located in the city of Ilorin in the ecclesiastical province of Ibadan in Nigeria.

== History ==
- January 20, 1960: Established as Apostolic Prefecture of Ilorin from the Roman Catholic Diocese of Ondo.
- May 29, 1969: Promoted as Diocese of Ilorin

== Special churches ==
The Cathedral is Saint Joseph Cathedral in Ilorin, Kwara State.

== Bishops ==
- Prefects Apostolic of Ilorin (Roman rite)
  - Fr. William Mahony, S.M.A. (1960.12.06 – 1969.05.29 see below)
- Bishops of Ilorin (Roman rite)
  - William Mahony, S.M.A. (see above 1969.05.29 – 1984.10.20)
  - John Olorunfemi Onaiyekan (1984.10.20 – 1990.07.07), appointed Coadjutor Bishop of Abuja; future Cardinal
  - Ayo-Maria Atoyebi, O.P. (1992.03.06 – 2019.06.11)
  - Paul Adegboyega Olawoore (2019.06.11 – 2022.01.01)
  - Anselm Pendo Lawani (2024.02.02 – present)

=== Coadjutor Bishop ===
- Paul Adegboyega Olawoore (2018-2019)

=== Auxiliary Bishop ===
- John Olorunfemi Onaiyekan (1982-1984), appointed Bishop here; future Cardinal

=== Other priests of this diocese who became bishops ===
- Martin Igwe Uzoukwu, appointed Bishop of Minna in 1996
- Bulus Dauwa Yohanna (priest here, 1998-2002), appointed Vicar Apostolic of Kontagora in 2012

== See also ==
- Roman Catholicism in Nigeria

== Sources ==
- GCatholic.org Information
- Catholic Hierarchy
- Official website
