= Our Lady of Fatima Cathedral, Kano =

Kano Cathedral
- Our Lady of Fatima Cathedral
- Kano Cathedral
- 12.0127°N 8.5412°E
- Location: Kano
- Country: Nigeria
- Denomination: Roman Catholic Church

History
- Status: Active
- Founded: 1954

The Our Lady of Fatima Cathedral or simply Kano Cathedral, is the name given to a religious building belonging to the Catholic Church in the city of Kano, one of the largest in the African country of Nigeria. It owes its name to the Virgin Mary who Catholics consider the Mother of God, under the invocation of Our Lady of Fatima.

The present structure was established as a parish church in 1954 and obtained the status of Cathedral in 1999 with the bull "Dilectas Afras" under the pontificate of Pope John Paul II. It functions as the main church or mother church of the diocese of Kano (Dioecesis Kanensis) which began as a Mission "sui iuris" in 1991 and was promoted to Apostolic Vicariate in 1995 (papal bull Cum Missio).

The temple follows the Roman Rite of the Catholic Church and is under the responsibility of Bishop John Namawzah Niyiring.

In 2018 a mass was held in this church to commemorate 100 years of Catholicism in the state of Kano with the presence of bishops and religious from all over the country.

== See also ==
- Roman Catholicism in Nigeria
- Assumpta Cathedral, Owerri
