= William Mahony (bishop) =

Catholic bishop in Ireland (1919–1994)

William Mahony SMA
- Bishop of Ilorin
- Church: Catholic Church
- Diocese: Diocese of Ilorin
- In office: 6 December 1960 – 20 October 1984
- Predecessor: Prefecture erected
- Successor: John Onaiyekan

Orders
- Ordination: 18 June 1947 by Eugene O'Doherty
- Consecration: 1 August 1969 by Pope Paul VI

Personal details
- Born: 29 April 1919 Derrybrien, County Galway, United Kingdom of Great Britain and Ireland
- Died: 15 November 1994 (aged 75)

William Mahony, SMA (29 April 1919 – 15 November 1994) was an Irish Catholic prelate who served as bishop of Ilorin.

== Biography ==
The son of Mick and Mary Mahony of Derrybrien, Slieve Aughty, Mahony had two sisters and three brothers. His father, grandfather and two of his brothers were blacksmiths, a motif he incorporated into his coat of arms as a bishop.

Mahony was at the Gort sheep fair when he heard the call of God to become a priest, joining the Society of African Missions in 1936. He studied in Ballinafad Co. Mayo, Cork, Galway, Newry and London.

Following completing his secondary education at Sacred Heart College, Ballinafad, he went to St. Joseph's, Wilton, Cork and began his university studies in University College Cork, before moving to the SMA novitiate at Cloughballymore, Kilcolgan, Co Galway, for two years, studying philosophy and completing his undergraduate degree in University College Galway, earning a B.A. degree (honours) in philosophy and education, in 1943. He entered the SMA major seminary in Dromantine House, Newry, studying theology, and being ordained a priest in St. Colman's Cathedral, in 1947. Following ordination, he gained a teaching diploma from the University of London, in 1948.

In 1948 he was assigned to what would become the Archdiocese of Kaduna in northern Nigeria, teaching there till 1960. In the latter year, he was appointed Prefect Apostolic of Ilorin (which was carved out of the diocese of Ondo), a province of more than thirty thousand square miles and a population of about one million. He was ordained bishop of Ilorin on 1 August 1969 in Kampala, Uganda, by the Pope.
