= Hyacinth Oroko Egbebo =

Nigerian Catholic prelate

Hyacinth Oroko Egbebo M.S.P.N.
- Bishop of Bomadi
- Church: Catholic Church
- Diocese: Diocese of Bomadi
- Appointed: 4 April 2009
- Predecessor: Joseph Egerega
- Previous posts: Titular Bishop of Lacubaza (2007-2017); Auxiliary Bishop of Bomadi (2007-2009)

Orders
- Ordination: 23 June 1990
- Consecration: 2 February 2008 by Renzo Fratini

Personal details
- Born: 23 October 1955 (age 70) Ogriagbene (west of Bomadi), Western Region, Federation of Nigeria, British Empire

Hyacinth Oroko Egbebo, MSP (born 23 October 1955) is a Nigerian Catholic prelate who has served as Bishop of Bomadi since 2017. Before Bomadi became a diocese that year, he served as Apostolic Vicar of Bomadi and Titular Bishop of Lacubaza. He has also served as superior general of the Missionary Society of Saint Paul of Nigeria.

== Biography ==
He was born in 1955 in Nigeria, and made a priest of the Roman Catholic Church in 1990. He was ordained bishop in 2008. He was Auxiliary Bishop and then Apostolic Vicar of Bomadi in Nigeria. He is now Bishop of Bomadi, having become that when Bomadi became a diocese.

In January 2016, Bishop Egbebo, then of Apostolic Vicariate of Bomadi, during the consecration of a Catholic priest under his vicariate, expressed concern over what he described as "high level of impunity and abuse of human rights in the anti-corruption war of President Muhammadu Buhari". He accused Buhari of a selective anti-graft war. He raised a concern over how disobey court order in his fight against corruption. He said "In as much as we would want to commend President Buhari on his zero tolerance on corruption, it is very disheartening and a risk to our democracy that the President would have the impunity to set aside court orders under the guise of his anti-corruption war".
