= Christ the King Cathedral, Aba =

Coordinates: 5.1039°N 7.3656°E

Christ the King Cathedral
- Christ the King Cathedral
- Location: Aba
- Country: Nigeria
- Denomination: Roman Catholic Church

The Christ the King Cathedral is a religious building in the Catholic Church that serves as the cathedral of Aba, a city with more than 500,000 inhabitants in Abia State of Nigeria. The church is the seat of the Bishop of the Diocese of Aba in Nigeria. The first small church of Christ the King in Aba was built by Eugene Groetz in 1929. Before his death in 1948, however, Groetz recognized the need to build a larger church and he sent Akpo Jacob to Italy to study the European Churches.

In 1963 the nave was completed, and in subsequent years various improvements followed. In 1993 a hexagonal baptistery in the nave to the east was added, the sacristy was expanded in 2002, and the exterior was improved with gardens, trees and statues of St. Peter and St. Paul in the west and east of St. Ann. In December 2004, the cathedral was dedicated to Christ the King.

== See also ==
- Roman Catholicism in Nigeria
- Christ the King Cathedral (disambiguation)
