= Teaching in Higher Education =

- Discipline: Education
- Language: English
- Edited by: Aneta Hayes

Publication details
- History: 1996–present
- Publisher: Taylor & Francis
- Frequency: 8/year
- Impact factor: 2.4 (2024)

Standard abbreviations
- ISO 4: Teach. High. Educ.

Indexing
- ISSN: 1356-2517 (print); 1470-1294 (web)
- LCCN: 2018205551
- OCLC no.: 1033814385

Links
- Journal homepage; Online access; Online archive

Teaching in Higher Education is a peer-reviewed academic journal publishing articles that offer critical perspectives on teaching in the setting of higher education. It was established in 1996 and is published eight times per year by Taylor & Francis. The founding editor-in-chief was Len Barton (UCL Institute of Education), and the current one is Aneta Hayes (University of Portsmouth, UK). According to the Journal Citation Reports, the journal has a 2024 impact factor of 2.4, ranking it 142nd out of 762 journals in the category "Education & Educational Research".
