= Jacqueline Dunkley-Bent =

- Education: University of Surrey
- Occupation: Chief Midwifery Officer
- Employer: NHS

Jacqueline Dunkley-Bent OBE was England's first Chief Midwifery Officer and Professor of Midwifery at King's College London and London South Bank University.

== Early life and career ==
Dunkley-Bent received her diploma in midwifery at the Royal College of Midwives, Her master's degree at Middlesex University and her doctorate at King's College London. She went on to complete her post-graduate teaching certificate at Surrey University before becoming a lecturer at Middlesex University. Dunkley-Bent has worked as a nurse and midwife, as well as in several management positions. She was the head of maternity, children and young people. She was part of the team that delivered Prince George and Princess Charlotte. She is the midwifery advisor for the Tommy's Charity National Advisory Board. In spring 2019 she was appointed the first Chief Midwifery Officer in the NHS, making her the most senior midwife in England.

In 2015 Dunkley-Bent won the Health Services Journal BME Pioneers award and received an OBE in 2017. In the 2020 and 2021 Powerlist, Dunkley-Bent was included as one of the 100 most influential people in the UK of African/African-Caribbean descent. The International Confederation of Midwives appointed Dunkley-Bent as its first chief midwife in May 2023. In May 2023, she was succeeded as England's Chief Midwifery Officer by Kate Brintworth.
