= Diocese of Bomadi =

Latin Catholic ecclesiastical jurisdiction in Nigeria

Diocese of Bomadi Dioecesis Bomadiensis

Location
- Country: Nigeria
- Territory: portions of Delta State and Rivers State and the entire Bayelsa State
- Ecclesiastical province: Benin City
- Deaneries: 5: Bomadi; Yenagoa; Agudama; Imiringi; Patani
- Coordinates: 5°10′00″N 5°56′00″E

Statistics
- Area: 13,140 km^{2} (5,070 sq mi)
- Population: Total; Catholics: (as of 2022); 3,905,250; 54,016 (1.4%)
- Parishes: 46

Information
- Denomination: Catholic Church
- Sui iuris church: Latin Church
- Rite: Roman Rite
- Established: 21 September 2017
- Cathedral: Our Lady of the Waters Cathedral, Bomadi
- Secular priests: 70

Current leadership
- Pope: Leo XIV
- Bishop: Most Rev. Hyacinth Oroko Egbebo

Map
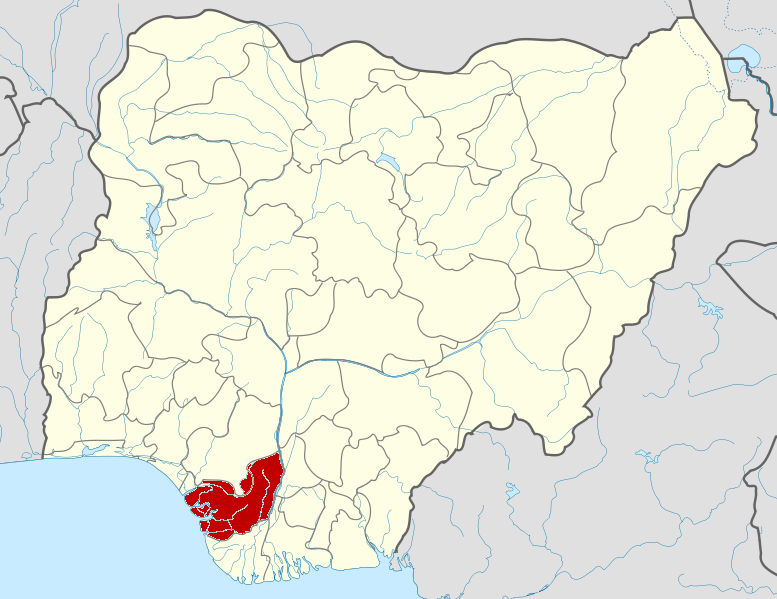
- Bomadi is located in southeastern Delta State which is located here in red.

The Diocese of Bomadi (Latin: Dioecesis Bomadiensis) is a Latin Church ecclesiastical jurisdiction or diocese of the Catholic Church in Nigeria. Its episcopal see is in Bomadi, Delta State. The diocese is a suffragan in the ecclesiastical province of the metropolitan Archdiocese of Benin City.

== Territory ==
The Apostolic Vicariate of Bomadi straddles the Niger River and Niger Delta and includes portions of Delta State and Rivers State.

== History ==
- 17 March 1991: Established as Mission “sui iuris” of Bomadi from the Dioceses of Port Harcourt and Warri.
- 15 December 1996: Promoted as Apostolic Vicariate of Bomadi
- 21 September 2017: elevated to Diocese

== Special Churches ==
- Our Lady of the Waters Cathedral, Bomadi

== Bishops ==
- Ecclesiastical Superior of Bomadi
  - Fr. Thomas Vincent Greenan (17 March 1991 – 15 December 1996)
- Vicars Apostolic of Bomadi
  - Bishop Joseph Egerega (3 March 1997 – 4 April 2009)
  - Bishop Hyacinth Oroko Egbebo (4 April 2009 – 21 September 2017 see below)
- Bishops of Bomadi
  - Hyacinth Oroko Egbebo (see above 21 September 2017 – present)

=== Auxiliary Bishop ===
- Hyacinth Oroko Egbebo, M.S.P.N. (2007-2009), appointed Vicar Apostolic here
