= Anselm Umoren =

Nigerian Catholic prelate

Anselm Umoren (born 14 April 1962) is a Nigerian Catholic prelate who serves as the auxiliary bishop of the Archdiocese of Abuja.

== Biography ==
Umoren was born on 14 April 1962 in Ukana Nto, Ikot Ekpene, Akwa Ibom State, Nigeria. He attended Queen of Apostles Minor Seminary, Afaha Obong, Abak. After his secondary education, he joined the Missionary Society of St. Paul of Nigeria and had his education in philosophy and theology at the National Missionary Seminary of St. Paul, Gwagwalada, Abuja. He was ordained priest on 18 July 1988.

From 1988 to 1992, he served in the house of formation at Iperu-Remo; from 1992 to 1995, he served as a missionary priest in the Diocese of Kenema, Sierra Leone; from 1995 to 2001, he served as a missionary priest in the Diocese of Buea, Cameroon and from 1995 to 2003, he became the general adviser. From 2003 to 2005, Umoren had his Masters in Development Studies from the Kimmage Development Studies Centre and Masters in International Peace Studies from the Irish School of Ecumenics in Dublin, Ireland. He was the superior general of the Missionary Society of St. Paul of Nigeria from 2008 until 8 November 2011 when he was appointed a bishop.
