= Bugewa Apampa =

Nigerian researcher

- Education: University of Benin, University of Manchester, University of Sussex
- Scientific career
- Fields: Pharmacy education

Bugewa Omawumi Apampa is a professor of Pharmacy Education at the University of Sussex and the former Director of Pharmacy Development. At the time of her promotion to professor, she was one of 18 black female university professors in the UK.

== Early life and career ==
Apampa received her first class Honours Degree in Pharmacy from the University of Benin. She moved to the UK in 1983 to pursue a Master's Degree in Pharmacy at the University of Manchester. After her Master's, she completed her PhD at the University of Manchester, with a thesis titled 'The Biological and Pharmacological effects of Interleukin-1ß'.

Apampa worked as a pharmacy manager and community pharmacy lead before pursuing a degree in Clinical Pharmacy. She returned to academia in the roles of director of learning and teaching and programme director at the Medway School of Pharmacy, which is a collaboration between the University of Kent and the University of Greenwich. During her time here, she received the University of Kent's Sciences Faculty Teaching Prize.

In 2016, Apampa joined the University of Sussex as the Director of Pharmacy Development and was responsible for setting up the Pharmacy Degree programme at Sussex University. While at Sussex, she was included in the 'Twelve Women in Academia' exhibition. In 2017, she was appointed a Fellow of the Royal Pharmaceutical Society.
