= Sidi-Meskin =

Sidi-Meskin, anciently known as Thunusuda, is a railway town and archaeological site in the Gouvernorat of Jendouba, Northern Tunisia. It is located in the Medjerda valley at 36.45N, 8.66E, outside of Bou Salem, and is near to Djendouba, Mechtat el Anad, and Djebel Bou Rbah. The town is located at an elevation of 430 meters above sea level, and has a mosque and railroad station.

The climate in Sidi Meskine is warm and temperate with more rainfall in the winter than in the summer. According to Köppen and Geiger, this climate is classified as Csa and the temperature averages 18.0 °C. The average annual rainfall is 502 mm.

== History ==
Historically, this region was important and wealthy. The historical importance becomes clear with the nearby great Roman cities of Bulla Regia and Chemtou.

The Medjerda valley became Roman after the Third Punic War about 146BC and it quickly became an important region for agriculture, with the rolling plains home to numerous Imperial estates. The town is mentioned, like many other nearby settlements, in the Saltus Burunitanus document of Commodus.

The Valley fell to the Vandal Kingdom around 423 and for a century was ruled by the Arian kings until in 533 the Orthodox Byzantines replaced them.

The area was held by Byzantium until the Muslim conquest of the Maghreb at the end of the 7th century.

During the Roman Empire, under the name of Thunusuda the town was part of Roman North Africa, Africa Proconsularis. It was on the Medjerda river between Simitthu and Bulla Regia, and like them both was the seat of an ancient bishopric, which survives today as a titular see of the Roman Catholic Church.
