= Roman Catholic Diocese of Minna =

Roman Catholic diocese in Nigeria

Diocese of Minna Dioecesis Minnaensis

Location
- Country: Nigeria
- Territory: eastern portion of Niger State
- Ecclesiastical province: Kaduna
- Metropolitan: Kaduna
- Coordinates: 9°36′50″N 6°33′25″E

Statistics
- Area: 36,031 km^{2} (13,912 sq mi)
- Population: Total; Catholics: (as of 2022); 3,817,920; 98,575 (2.6%)
- Parishes: 62

Information
- Denomination: Roman Catholic
- Rite: Latin Rite
- Established: 17 September 1973
- Cathedral: Saint Michael Cathedral in Minna
- Secular priests: 125

Current leadership
- Pope: Leo XIV
- Bishop: Most Rev. Martin Igwe Uzoukwu

Map
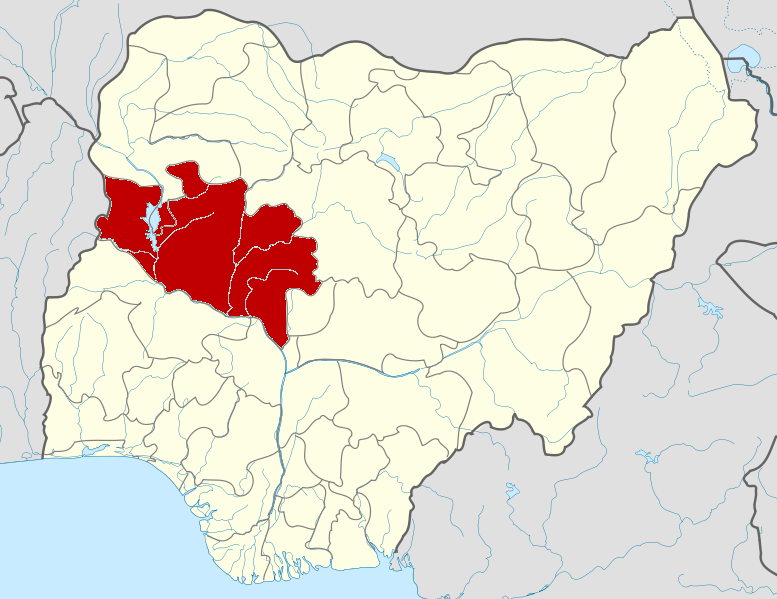
- The Diocese of Minna is located in eastern Niger State which is shown here in red.

The Roman Catholic Diocese of Minna (Latin: Minnaën(sis)) is a diocese located in the city of Minna in the ecclesiastical province of Kaduna in Nigeria.

== History ==
- 9 November 1964: Established as Apostolic Prefecture of Minna from Metropolitan Archdiocese of Kaduna
- 17 September 1973: Promoted as Diocese of Minna

== Special churches ==
The Cathedral is St. Michael's Cathedral in Minna.

== Leadership ==
- Prefects Apostolic of Minna (Roman rite)
  - Father Edmund Joseph Fitzgibbon, S.P.S. (25 November 1964 – 17 September 1973), resigned; future Bishop
- Bishops of Minna (Roman rite)
  - Bishop Christopher Shaman Abba (17 September 1973 – 5 June 1996), appointed Bishop of Yola
  - Bishop Martin Igwe Uzoukwu (since 5 June 1996)
  - Bishop Luka Sylvester Gopep (Auxiliary Bishop since 9 September 2020)

== Persecution ==
On 15 January 2023, suspected Fulani herdsmen attacked the residence of the parish priests of Kafin Koro. They set fire to the house. Fr Collins managed to escape the burning building and was shot in the leg, but Fr Isaac Achi was burned to death.

Fr Paul Sanogo, and Brother Melchior Mahinini, originally from Mali and from Tanzania, respectively, were kidnapped on 2 August. The priest and seminarian belong to the Missionaries of Africa. They were both released on 23 August, physically unharmed, though traumatised.

== See also ==
- Roman Catholicism in Nigeria
