= Killing of Iniubong Umoren =

Nigerian kidnapper

Uduak Akpan
- Born: Frank Uduak Akpan; 2001; Uyo, Akwa Ibom State, Nigeria
- Convictions: Kidnapping, rape and murder
- Penalty: Death by hanging

Frank Uduak-Abasi Akpan, also known as Ezekiel Uduak Akpan, is a Nigerian from Uyo in Akwa Ibom State who was found guilty of kidnapping Iniubong Umoren, known as Hiny Humorenon Twitter.

Uduak-Abasi Akpan was found guilty on 4 August 2022 by the Akwa Ibom State High Court in Uyo of killing jobseeker Iniubong Umoren.

== Conviction ==
Justice Bassey Nkanang, the trial judge, also gave Akpan a life sentence for rape in his ruling. After the court ruling, Akpan attempted to run out of the court but the security personnel on the scene stepped in to stop him.

In his ruling on 4 August 2022, the judge, Bassey Nkanang, stated that the convicted man will be hanged to death.

Mr. Akpan was given a life sentence after Mr. Nkanang found him guilty of rape. The prosecutor, according to the judge, has established beyond a reasonable doubt Mr. Akpan's guilt of both rape and murder.

However, he released and exonerated Mr. Akpan's father and sister, the second and third defendants in the case.

Umoren, a University of Uyo philosophy graduate, died in April 2021. While awaiting mobilization for the National Youth Service Corps (NYSC) program, she was looking for a job.

Iniubong Umoren, a philosophy graduate from the University of Uyo (UNIUYO), was murdered, raped, and buried in a small grave in April 2021 by Uduak-Abasi Akpan, a man accused of having committed other rapes.

With the promise of a job, Uduak-Abasi Akpan allegedly persuaded his 26-year-old victim to visit his family's home in Nung Ikono Obio village in the Uruan local government region where he raped, killed, and buried her in a shallow grave.
