= Uduak Archibong =

Academic and nursing researcher

Uduak Emmanuel Archibong
- Born: Nigeria
- Education: University of Hull (PhD); University of Nigeria, Nsukka (BSc)
- Awards: Order of the British Empire (2014)
- Scientific career
- Workplaces: University of Bradford
- Thesis: Promoting family-centred care through primary nursing practice in Nigeria : an action research project (1995)

Uduak Emmanuel Archibong MBE FRCN is a Professor of Diversity and Director of the Centre for Inclusion and Diversity at the University of Bradford. She is a Fellow of the Royal College of Nursing and a Fellow of the West African College of Nursing.

== Early life and education ==
Archibong was born and raised in rural Nigeria. Here she trained in nursing and achieved first class honours at the University of Nigeria, Nsukka. She moved to Hull, England, where she earned a doctoral degree researching family-centred care and nurse's education in Nigeria. She retrained as a nurse in the British system, and started practising in National Health Service hospitals. She worked in the Hull Royal Infirmary and the Queensgate Care Home. Archibong recognised the underrepresentation of black and minority ethnic women and men in British healthcare, and that healthcare professionals of colour often experienced racism from their patients and colleagues.

== Research and career ==
In 1995 Archibong moved to the University of Bradford, where she worked as a lecturer in nursing. She was promoted to Senior Lecturer then Head of Nursing in 1999. She was made Fellow of the West African College of Nursing in 2001 and Professor of Diversity in 2004. Archibong serves as the university strategic adviser for equality and diversity. She demonstrated that black and minority ethnic clinicians in the National Health Service were more likely to be involved with disciplinary action than their white colleagues who had similar track records and behaviour.

She was appointed Professor of Diversity and Director of the Centre for Inclusion and Diversity at the University of Bradford, where she led the Genovate network.

=== Awards and honours ===
She was appointed Fellow of the Royal College of Nursing in 2012. In 2015 she was made an Order of the British Empire for her services to higher education and equality. She was named as one of the Northern Power Women in 2019 and one of Bradford's Inspirational Women in 2020.

She was featured in the exhibition Phenomenal Women: Portraits of UK Black Female Professors alongside her University of Bradford colleague Engobo Emeseh.
