= British Journal of Sociology of Education =

The British Journal of Sociology of Education
- Discipline: Education, Social Policy, Sociology
- Language: English
- Edited by: David James

Publication details
- History: 1980–present
- Publisher: Routledge (United Kingdom)
- Frequency: 8/year
- Impact factor: 1.324 (2016)

Standard abbreviations
- ISO 4: Br. J. Sociol. Educ.

Indexing
- ISSN: 0142-5692 (print); 1465-3346 (web)

Links
- Journal homepage; Online access; Online archive

The British Journal of Sociology of Education is a peer-reviewed academic journal in the fields of education and sociology. According to the Journal Citation Reports, the journal has a 2016 impact factor of 1.324.
