= Alexius Obabu Makozi =

- Bishop of Port Harcourt
- Church: Catholic Church
- Diocese: Diocese of Port Harcourt
- In office: 31 August 1991 – 4 May 2009
- Predecessor: Godfrey Okoye
- Successor: Camillus Archibong Etokudoh
- Previous posts: Bishop of Lokoja (1972-1991); Titular Bishop of Fallaba (1971-1972); Auxiliary Bishop of Lokoja (1971-1972)

Orders
- Ordination: 8 December 1961
- Consecration: 30 May 1971 by John Kwao Amuzu Aggey

Personal details
- Born: 15 February 1932 Okene, Kabba Province, Northern Region, Colony and Protectorate of Nigeria, British Empire
- Died: 16 January 2016 (aged 83)

Alexius Obabu Makozi (born 15 February 1932 in Okene – 16 January 2016) was a Nigerian clergyman and bishop for the Roman Catholic Diocese of Lokoja. He was appointed bishop in 1971; he later assumed the same role in Port Harcourt. He died in 2016.
