= Iyiola Solanke =

British academic

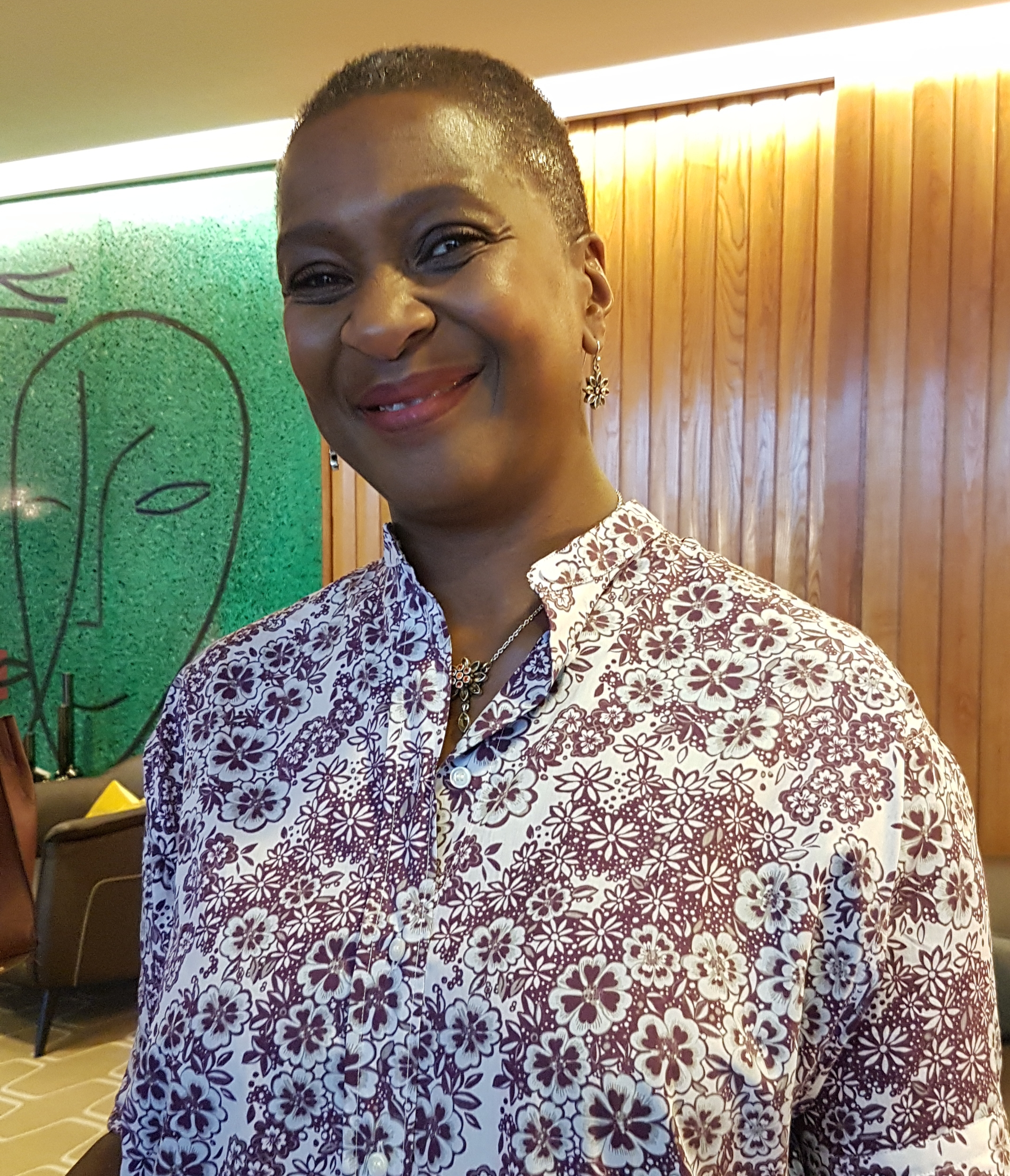
- at TEDxLondon Beyond Borders in May 2019

Academic background
- Education: University of London; London School of Economics

Iyiola Solanke is an Academic Fellow in the Inner Temple and Jacques Delors Professor of European Union Law at the University of Oxford, where she is a Fellow of Somerville College. Previously, she was the Chair in European Union law at the University of Leeds. She is specialized in the European Union and racial integration, and founded the Black Female Professors Forum in 2017.

== Early life and education ==
Solanke earned a bachelor's degree in German and Drama at the University of London, and graduated in 1992. She moved to the London School of Economics for her graduate studies, earned a master's degree and PhD in 2005. She worked as a Teaching Fellow at the London School of Economics. She joined the University of Michigan Law School as a Jean Monnet Fellow in 2007.

== Research and career ==
Solanke investigates governance in European institutions, including the European Court of Justice. She specialises in discrimination law and European Union law. Solanke joined the University of Leeds in 2010. That year, Solanke was one of the first people to be appointed Academic Fellow of the Inner Temple. She founded Temple Women's Forum North in 2013. The forum exists to extend outreach from the Inner Temple to legal professionals in the North East. Solanke investigates discrimination law as a stigma using sociological and socio-psychological theories. She is a visiting professor at Wake Forest University, where she teachers courses European Union law. She has written about the need for proper rights of European Union nationals after the United Kingdom has left the European Union.

Solanke was appointed to the University of Salamanca in 2017. She was made a member of the Valuation Tribunal for England, which looks to support legal appeals for the population of the United Kingdom. In January 2018 Solanke was appointed the Fernand Braudel Fellow at the European University Institute, where she is working on the theory and practise of judiciary diversity in Europe.

Solanke was appointed chair of the inquiry into the history of eugenics at University College London. The inquiry was launched in November 2018, and will inform the University College London strategy on teaching and studying eugenics, as well as identifying its relationships with modern-day racism.

=== Advocacy and public engagement ===
Solanke founded the Black Female Professors Forum in 2017. She has written for the Huffington Post and is a speaker at TEDxLondon in 2019.

In January 2018, Solanke joined a commission investigating the death of Oury Jalloh.

=== Books ===
- Solanke, Iyiola (2010). Making Anti-Racial Discrimination Law. Routledge. ISBN 978-0415685474.
- Solanke, Iyiola (2015). EU Law. Pearson. ISBN 978-1408228333.
- Solanke, Iyiola (2017). Discrimination as Stigma – A Theory of Anti-Discrimination Law. ISBN 9781849467384.
