= Diocese of Idah =

Roman Catholic diocese in Nigeria

Diocese of Idah Dioecesis Idahinus

Location
- Country: Nigeria
- Territory: Kogi State
- Ecclesiastical province: Abuja
- Metropolitan: Abuja
- Coordinates: 7°05′00″N 6°45′00″E

Statistics
- Area: 15,113 km^{2} (5,835 sq mi)
- Population: Total; Catholics: (as of 2022); 2,629,112; 318,724 (12.1%)
- Parishes: 65

Information
- Denomination: Roman Catholic
- Rite: Latin Rite
- Cathedral: Saint Boniface Cathedral in Idah
- Secular priests: 99

Current leadership
- Pope: Leo XIV
- Bishop: Anthony Adaji

Map
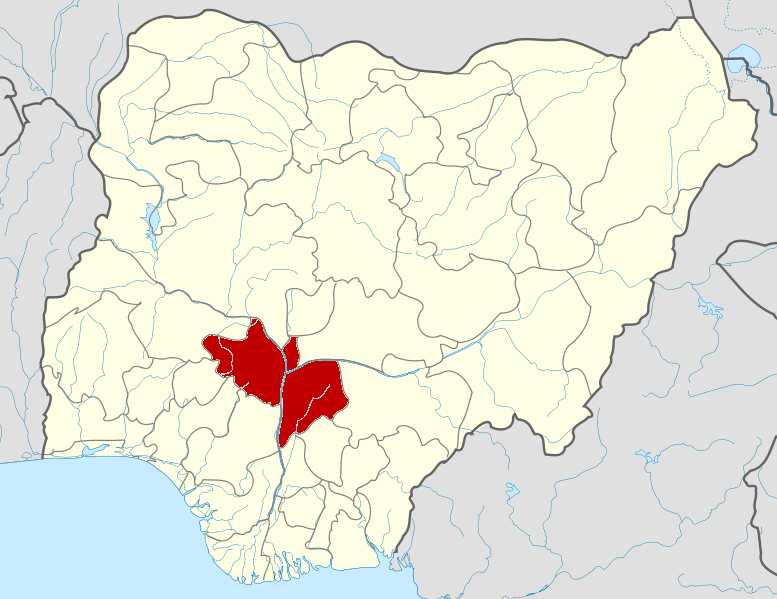
- Kogi State is shown in red.

The Roman Catholic Diocese of Idah (Latin: Idahin(us)) is a Latin suffragan diocese located in the city of Idah, Kogi State in the ecclesiastical province of Abuja, in Nigeria, yet remains subject to the Roman missionary Congregation for the Evangelization of Peoples.

Idah is located along the Niger river in Kogi State of Nigeria. The diocese mainly serves the Igala, Bassa and Igbo ethnic groups, who live in Kogi east along the Niger and Benue rivers, below their confluence, around Lokoja.

== History ==
The first recorded Christian activities in this area are attributed to the services of the Church Missionary Society, a branch of Anglicanism, especially members of the 1841 British Niger Expedition, that included the African and Yoruba ex-slave, Samuel Ajayi Crowther, later to become an Anglican Bishop.

== Special churches ==
The Cathedral episcopal see is St. Boniface Cathedral, in Idah, which takes its name from the German missionary founding bishop of Fulda, St. Boniface (Winifred).
