= Kabba =

- Kabba shown within Nigeria
- Coordinates: cities7°50′00″N 6°04′00″E
- Country: Nigeria
- State: Kogi State
- LGA: Kabba/Bunu

Area
  - Total: 330 km^{2} (130 sq mi)
- Time zone: UTC+1 (WAT (UTC+1))
- National language: Yorùbá

Kabba is a town in Kogi State in mid west Nigeria. It lies near the Osse River, at the intersection of roads from Lokoja, Okene, Ogidi, Ado-Ekiti, and Egbe. The town is about 295 kilometers away from Abuja. It is 511 kilometers from Lagos.

Archbishop John Olorunfemi Onaiyekan, of the Roman Catholic Archdiocese of Abuja, based in Abuja, Nigeria, was born there.

== Early and colonial history ==
Kabba formed part at one time of the Bida Emirate, and under Fula rule the armies of Bida regularly raided for slaves. Lokoja, a city which up to 1902 was the principal British station in the protectorate, is situated in this province. The site of Lokoja, with a surrounding tract of country at the junction of the Benue and Niger rivers, was ceded to the British government in 1841 by the attah of Idah, whose dominions at that time extended to the right bank of the river. The first British settlement failed. In 1854 MacGregor Laird, who had taken an active part in promoting the British exploration of the river, sent William Balfour Baikie, who was successful in dealing with the locals and in 1857 became the first British consul in the interior. The town of Lokoja was founded by him in 1860.

In 1868 the consulate was abolished and the settlement was left wholly to commercial interests. In 1879 Sir George Goldie formed the Royal Niger Company, which bought out its foreign rivals and acquired a charter from the British government. In 1886 the company made Lokoja its military centre, and on the transfer of the company's territories to the Crown it remained for a time the capital of the Northern Nigeria Protectorate. In 1902 the political capital of the protectorate was shifted to Zungeru in the province of Zaria, but Lokoja remained the commercial centre.

During colonial times, Kabba was divided into four administrative divisions. British and native courts of justice were established. A British station was established at Kabba town, which was accessible by road from Lokoja, and roads were opened through the province.

The Northern Region of Nigeria, which is now defunct, included all of the current Kogi State.

== Description ==
Kabba is a trade centre for coffee, cocoa, yams, cassava, maize, sorghum, shea nuts, peanuts (groundnuts), beans, cotton, and woven cloth produced by the Yoruba, Ebira, and other peoples of the surrounding area.

Kabba people speak a dialect of the Yoruba Language called Owe.

Kabba is the headquarters of the Kabba/Bunnu local government area of Kogi state and the current Chairman of Kabba/Bunu Local Government is Hon.E. O. Olorunleke Moses. Kabba has a tripodal traditional leadership called: Obaro, Obadofin and Obajemu, with the Obaro who is also the chairman of the Okun traditional council as head. The present Obaro is Oba Solomon Owoniyi (Obaro Oweyomade 1) who took over in 2018 after the demise of Oba Michael Olobayo (Obaro Ero Il). His palace is located at Odo-Aofin. Other notable settlements in Kabba include Aiyeteju, Odi-olowo, Kajola, Odo-ero, Odolu, Fehinti, Surulere, other settlements refer to as Ikowaopa includes Iyah, Otu, Egbeda, Gbeleko, Okedayo, Kakun, Ohakiti, Obele, Ogbagba, Ayonghon, Ayedun, Ayetoro Egunbe of Obangogo, Iduge, Adesua, Asanta, Korede, Okekoko, Katu, Apanga and others.

Kabba kingdom is divided into three major communities with a total of 14 clans:

- Kabba – 6 clans.
- Katu – 3 clans.
- Odolu – 5 clans.

Secondary Schools in Kabba include Government Science School Okedayo, Federal Government Girls College, Saint Augustine's College, Saint Barnabas Secondary School, Saint Monica's College, Sacred Heart College Iyah – Kabba, Bishop McCalla Secondary School, Local Government Comprehensive High School, Christ Secondary School, Oloruntobi Group of Schools, Green Valley Grammar School, Local Government Secondary School Kakun, Aunty Fola Excel School, Wise Virgin Secondary School, Local Government school Otu-Egunbe, kogi state university kabba, Kogi State College Of Education Technical Egbeda, and College of Agriculture, a division of Agricultural Colleges Ahmadu Bello University Zaria.

Also in Kabba is the ancient Sacred Heart Catholic church which has produced numerous priests in Nigeria and across the globe including the Archbishop John Olorunfemi Onaiyekan.

Kabba is the present headquarters of Kogi Western senatorial district and also the headquarters of Kabba-Bunu-Ijumu Federal Constituency.

== Notable people ==
- Etannibi Alemika, Iluke Bunu
- Joseph Abiodun Balogun, Isanlu
- Abubakar Musa, Mopa
- Archbishop John Onaiyekan, Abuja, Nigeria.
- Tunde Ednut
