= List of Catholic dioceses in Nigeria =

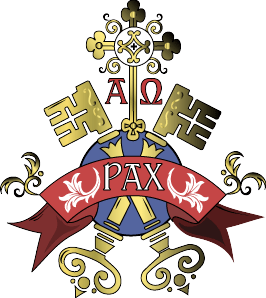
Traditional Catholic Digital Graphics (1)

The Catholic Church in Nigeria is mainly composed of a Latin hierarchy, joined in a national Episcopal Conference of Nigeria, and a single Eastern Catholic (transnational) see, comprising:

- 9 Latin rite ecclesiastical provinces, each under a Metropolitan Archbishop, with a total of 44 suffragan dioceses
- one missionary apostolic vicariate
- one Maronite diocese, for all Western and Central Africa

There are no titular sees. All defunct jurisdictions have current successor sees.

There is an Apostolic Nunciature (papal diplomatic representation at embassy-level) to Nigeria in the national capital, Abuja. It also hosts the papal Permanent Observer to Economic Community of West African States (ECOWAS).

== Eastern Catholic ==
=== Exempt (directly under the Holy See) ===
- Maronite Catholic Eparchy of Annunciation of Ibadan, with see in Ibadan, Oyo state

== Current dioceses ==
=== Ecclesiastical Province of Abuja ===
- Metropolitan Archdiocese of Abuja
  - Diocese of Gboko
  - Diocese of Idah
  - Diocese of Katsina-Ala
  - Diocese of Lafia
  - Diocese of Lokoja
  - Diocese of Makurdi
  - Diocese of Otukpo

=== Ecclesiastical Province of Benin City ===
- Metropolitan Archdiocese of Benin City
  - Diocese of Auchi
  - Diocese of Issele-Uku
  - Diocese of Uromi
  - Diocese of Warri
  - Diocese of Bomadi

=== Ecclesiastical Province of Calabar ===
- Metropolitan Archdiocese of Calabar
  - Diocese of Ikot Ekpene
  - Diocese of Ogoja
  - Diocese of Port Harcourt
  - Diocese of Uyo

=== Ecclesiastical Province of Ibadan ===
- Metropolitan Archdiocese of Ibadan
  - Diocese of Ekiti
  - Diocese of Ilorin
  - Diocese of Ondo
  - Diocese of Osogbo
  - Diocese of Oyo

=== Ecclesiastical Province of Jos ===
- Metropolitan Archdiocese of Jos
  - Diocese of Bauchi
  - Diocese of Jalingo
  - Diocese of Maiduguri
  - Diocese of Pankshin
  - Diocese of Shendam
  - Diocese of Wukari
  - Diocese of Yola

=== Ecclesiastical Province of Kaduna ===
- Metropolitan Archdiocese of Kaduna
  - Diocese of Kafanchan
  - Diocese of Kano
  - Diocese of Katsina
  - Diocese of Kontagora
  - Diocese of Minna
  - Diocese of Sokoto
  - Diocese of Zaria

=== Ecclesiastical Province of Lagos ===
- Metropolitan Archdiocese of Lagos
  - Diocese of Abeokuta
  - Diocese of Ijebu-Ode

=== Ecclesiastical Province of Onitsha ===
- Metropolitan Archdiocese of Onitsha
  - Diocese of Abakaliki
  - Diocese of Aguleri
  - Diocese of Awgu
  - Diocese of Awka
  - Diocese of Enugu
  - Diocese of Nnewi
  - Diocese of Nsukka
  - Diocese of Ekwulobia

=== Ecclesiastical Province of Owerri ===
- Metropolitan Archdiocese of Owerri
  - Diocese of Aba
  - Diocese of Ahiara
  - Diocese of Okigwe
  - Diocese of Orlu
  - Diocese of Umuahia

== See also ==
- Catholic dioceses (structured view)
- Outline of Nigeria

== Sources and external links ==
- GCatholic.org - data for all sections.
- Catholic Bishops' Conference of Nigeria
- Catholic News Service of Nigeria
- Catholic-Hierarchy entry.
- Nigerian Catholic Diocesan Priests Association (NCDPA)
- Jurisdictions and Ordinaries in Nigeria
