= Mater Amabilis Secondary School =

Secondary school in Anambra State, Nigeria

Location
- Umuoji, Anambra State; Nigeria; 6.1129°N 6.8739°E

Information
- Type: Public single sex secondary boarding school
- Motto: Vincit Omnia Veritas lit. 'Truth Conquers All'
- Established: January 1962, 15; 64 years ago
- Educational authority: Anambra State Ministry of Education
- Principal: Fr. Francis Onwuchulum (manager); Lucy Ibekwe (principal)
- Teaching staff: 40 (2025)
- Years: JSS1–SS3
- Gender: girls
- Enrolment: 1000 (2025)
- Campus: Suburban
- Colours: Green and white
- Website: materamabilisumuoji.org

Mater Amabilis Secondary School is a Catholic boarding high school in Umuoji, Anambra State, Nigeria. It is operated by the Roman Catholic Archdiocese of Onitsha and was founded on 15 January 1962 by Archbishop Charles Heerey.

== History ==
The school was founded by Archbishop Charles Heerey on 15 January 1962. In 1905, Igwe Okafor Ugwumba, the traditional monarch of Umuoji invited the Irish Catholic missionaries to develop Umuoji after he saw their works and improvements to Onitsha. Bishop Joseph Shanahan, the Apostolic Prefect of the Lower Niger Mission sent Jacob Chukwuemeka Odiakosa, a cathecist and local teacher. Jacob built the Umuoji parish on a land donated by the community. In 1951, Fr. John Jordan became the parish priest of the parish. Because he previously worked in the Education House in Onitsha, he was able to build Our Lady's Teacher Training College. On 15 January 1962, Archbishop Charles Heerey converted the college into an all-girls boarding secondary school. It was renamed as Mater Amabilis Secondary School. About 60 candidates were admitted. Miss Margaret Ward became the first principal while Justina Egbuna became the senior prefect. The school was operated by the Catholic Church from 1962 until the period when the Nigerian Civil War began in 1967. Amidst the war, many missionary schools were captured and destroyed by the government. Miss Margaret Ward, who returned to Ireland, handed over her position to Mr. Ochiabuto, who became the first indigenous principal. The government of Peter Obi returned all the missionary schools to the church in 2010.

== Academics ==
=== Honours ===
Mater Amabilis, along St. Michael's Model Comprehensive Secondary School, Nimo and All Hallows Seminary, Onitsha won in the 2023 Malaysia International Debate Championship. Also, the school won the Anambra State Best School of the Year in the same year. Mater Amabilis have spanned success in the Onitsha Archdiocesan regional science competition AVOSCO as well as InterswitchSPAK. It emerged the State Champions in the Milo Basketball Championship.

Mater Amabilis won the 2023 National Entrepreneurship Exhibition and Awards competition at Abuja. Anambra State won the 2022 National interschool Presidential Debate with a team of four students of which one is from Mater Amabilis.

== Administration ==
- Archbishop Charles Heerey CSSp – Founder
- Miss Margaret Ward (1962 – 1967)
- Mr. Ochiabuto (1967 – 1972)
- E.U Onwuagha (January 1972 – May 1972)
- Patience Egbuna (1972 – 1976)
- Mrs. Uzodimma (1976 – 1978)
- Mrs. J.A Azike (1979 – 1983)
- Mr. Ochiaya (1984 – 1987)
- Mrs. Iwenjora (1988–1994)
- Mrs. M.O Nwafor (1995–1995)
- Mrs. C.O Nwachukwu (1995 – 1996)
- Mrs. C.C Okoye (1997 – 2000)
- Ngozi Agbasimalo (Principal, 2001 – 2003)
  - Mrs. C. Nwolum (Principal of the Junior Secondary, 2001)
- Rose Dim (2003 – 2005)
  - Lilian Nnezianya (Principal of the Junior Secondary, 2005 – 2008)
- Angela Obodozie (2005 – 2012)
- Fr. Tochukwu Ibe (Manager, 2010 – 2021)
  - Josephine Emodi (Principal, 2012 – 2013)
  - Ebele Okoli (Principal, 2013 – 2020)
- Fr. Francis Onwuchulum (Manager, 2021–)
  - Florence Ezebube (Principal, 2020–)

== Notable alumni ==
- Ngozi Chuma-Udeh, Anambra State Commissioner for Education
