= Catholic Church in Nigeria =

- Type: National polity
- Classification: Catholic
- Governance: Catholic Bishops' Conference of Nigeria
- Pope: Leo XIV
- President: Matthew Man-Oso Ndagoso
- Region: Nigeria
- Language: English, Latin
- Members: 38.2 million (2026)

The Catholic Church in Nigeria is part of the worldwide Catholic Church, under the spiritual leadership of the Pope, the Curia in Rome, and the Catholic Bishops' Conference of Nigeria (CBCN).

As of 2026, the president of the CBCN is Matthew Man-Oso Ndagoso, Archbishop of Kaduna. He followed the previous president, Lucius Iwejuru Ugorji.

== Overview ==
The Latin and Eastern Catholic Churches comprise the world's largest Christian Church and the largest religious grouping globally. In 2005, there were an estimated 19 million baptised Catholics in Nigeria. In 2010, the Catholic population accounted for approximately 12.6% of the population, 70% of which can be found in Southeast Nigeria.

Historically, the Holy Ghost Fathers maintained a strong presence in Igboland in today's South-eastern Nigeria, whereas the White Fathers operated in Western and Northern Nigeria, and the Society of African Missions in Lagos.

Nigeria, together with the Congo-Kinshasa, boasts of the highest number of priests in Africa. The boom in vocations to the priesthood in Nigeria is mainly in the South-eastern part, especially among the Igbo ethnic group, of which the first evangelizers were Holy Ghost Fathers.

The second papal visit to the country in 1998 witnessed the beatification of Blessed Cyprian Michael Iwene Tansi. Pope John Paul II proclaimed him blessed at Oba, Onitsha Archdiocese, a local Church established by the apostle of eastern Nigeria, Bishop Joseph Shanahan, CSSp.

The official patron saints of Nigeria are Mary, Queen of Nigeria, and Patrick of Ireland.

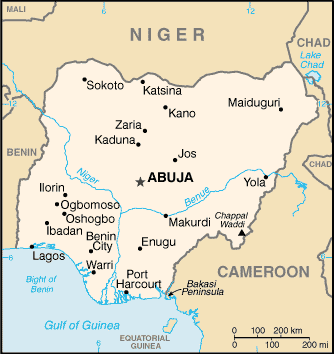
Map of Nigeria

== Demographics ==
Christianity was followed by an estimated 46.18% of the Nigerian population in 2020; one-quarter of Christians in Nigeria are Catholic (12.39% of the country's population).

In the same year, over 9,500 priests and 6,500 religious sisters served over 4,000 parishes.

=== Church of the Agudas ===
Old communities of Catholics in the country include those of some Yorubas of the South-West, who are known in the Yoruba language as Ijo Aguda (lit. "Church of the Agudas") due to their historic connection to the Brazilian Nigerian community. The link between these Brazilians, commonly called Agudas, and the wider community of Yoruba Catholics dates back to the establishment of a group of lay believers in Lagos in the decades prior to the construction of the Holy Cross Cathedral in the city in 1881.

== List of dioceses ==
The Catholic Church in Nigeria is organized into ecclesiastical provinces, each headed by a Metropolitan Archbishop. Each province consists of a Metropolitan Archdiocese and several Suffragan Dioceses. In addition, areas not yet established as dioceses are organized as Apostolic Vicariates.

Archdioceses	9
Suffragan Dioceses	51
Parishes	4,944 (2023)
Diocesan Priests	8,312
Religious Priests	1,997
♦Total Priests	10,309 (2023)
Religious Women	6,741
Major seminaries in Nigeria	6
Major seminarians	6,333
Minor seminaries in Nigeria	20
Minor seminarians	
♦Total seminarians	
Educational institutes	4,163
Charitable institutes	1,202
References	GCatholic page for 2023

- Abuja
  - Gboko
  - Idah
  - Katsina-Ala
  - Lafia
  - Lokoja
  - Makurdi
  - Otukpo
- Benin City
  - Auchi
  - Bomadi
  - Issele-Uku
  - Uromi
  - Warri
- Calabar
  - Ikot Ekpene
  - Ogoja
  - Port Harcourt
  - Uyo
- Ibadan
  - Ekiti
  - Ilorin
  - Ondo
  - Osogbo
  - Oyo
- Jos
  - Bauchi
  - Jalingo
  - Maiduguri
  - Pankshin
  - Shendam
  - Yola
- Kaduna
  - Kafanchan
  - Kano
  - Kontagora
  - Minna
  - Sokoto
  - Zaria
- Lagos
  - Abeokuta
  - Ijebu-Ode
- Onitsha
  - Abakaliki
  - Aguleri
  - Awgu
  - Awka
  - Ekwulobia
  - Enugu
  - Nnewi
  - Nsukka
- Owerri
  - Aba
  - Ahiara
  - Okigwe
  - Orlu
  - Umuahia

Immediately subject to the Holy See:

- Maronite Catholic Eparchy of the Annunciation

== Episcopal conference ==
The Catholic Bishops' Conference of Nigeria is the Nigerian episcopal conference. Its current President is Lucius Iwejuru Ugorji.

== Catholic traditionalism ==
A more traditionalist subset of the Catholic Church is also present in Nigeria and embodied by the Priestly Fraternity of St. Peter (Nne Enyemaka Shrine, Umuaka). There also exists a community of the irregular status Society of St. Pius X (Saint Michael's Priory, Enugu).

== Catholic universities in Nigeria ==
- Caritas University, Amorji-Nike
- Spiritan University, Nneochi.
- Godfrey Okoye University, Enugu
- Madonna University (Ihiala), Okija
- Our Saviour Institute of Science and Technology, Enugu
- VUNA, Veritas University Abuja (The Catholic University of Nigeria), Abuja
- Augustine University Ilara
- Pan-Atlantic University, Lagos
- Dominican University, Ibadan

== Major seminaries in Nigeria ==
- Seminary of Saints Peter and Paul, Ibadan, Oyo State, Nigeria
- Seminary of All Saints, Uhiele Ekpoma, Edo State, Nigeria
- Bigard Memorial Seminary, Enugu
- St. Thomas Aquinas Major Seminary, Makurdi
- St. Augustine's Major Seminary, Jos
- National Missionary Seminary of St. Paul, Gwagwalada
- St Joseph Major Seminary Ikot Ekpene
- Blessed Tansi Major Seminary Onitsha, Anambra State
- St Albert The Great Major Seminary Abeokuta
- St. John of the Cross Spiritual Year Seminary, Ekpoma
- Seat of Wisdom Major Seminary, Owerri
- Seat of Wisdom Major Seminary, Umuahia Campus
- JohnPaul II Major Seminary, Awka
- Good Shepherd Major Seminary, Kaduna
- Claretian Institute of Philosophy, Nekede Owerri
- Spiritan Institute of Theology Attakwu Enugu
- Spiritan Institute of Philosophy, Isienu Nsukka
- Don Bosco Institute of Philosophy Affiliated to Salesian Pontifical University (Rome)
- Dominican Institute

== Minor seminaries in Nigeria ==
- St Augustine's seminary, Amechi Ezzamgbo, Abakaliki, Ebonyi State
- Holy Ghost Juniorate Seminary, Ihiala, Anambra State. (Spiritans)
- Queen of Apostles Seminary, Afaha Obong, Abak, Akwa Ibom State
- Immaculate Conception Seminary, Mfamosing, Cross River State
- St John Vianney Minor Seminary, Barkin-Ladi, Plateau State
- St James' Junior Seminary, Yandev Gboko
- St Jude's Minor Seminary, Kuje Abuja
- St Theresa's Minor Seminary Oke-Are Ibadan
- Sacred Hearts Minor Seminary Akure
- St Clement's Minor Seminary, Adankolo-Lokoja, Kogi State
- St Paul's Seminary Ukpor, Nnewi Anambra State
- All Hallows Seminary, Onitsha Anambra State
- St Joseph's Seminary Special Science School, Awka-Etiti Anambra State.
- Mercy Seminary, Bende Abia State
- Immaculate Conception Seminary, Ahiaeke Umuahia, Abia State
- St Dominic Savio Seminary, Akpu, Anambra State
- St John Bosco Seminary, Isuaniocha, Anambra State
- Holy Martyrs of Uganda seminary Effurun, Delta State
- Annunciation Seminary Amaudara, Abia State
- St John-cross minor seminary, Isienu-Nsukka, Enugu state
- St Charles Borromeo seminary, Imiringi, Bayelsa State.
- St Mary's Seminary Umuowa, Orlu, Imo State.
- Bonus Pastor Seminary Osina, Ideato North, Imo State.
- Assumpta Minor Seminary, Owerri Archdiocese.
- Mater Ecclesiae Seminary, Nguru Mbaise, Ahiara Diocese
- St Peter Claver's Seminary Okpala Owerri Archdiocese
- Pope John Paul II Seminary Yala Okpoma Ogoja Diocese
- St Peter's Seminary Ogii, Okigwe Diocese
- Sacred Heart Seminary, Rumuebiekwe Port Hacourt, Port hacourt Diocese
- St Felix Seminary Ejeme-Anigor, Delta State
- St Joseph Seminary Basawa, Zaria, Kaduna State.
- St Charles Borromeo Minor Seminary, Madakiya Kaduna State
- St Peter's Minor Seminary, Katari Kaduna State
- St Peter's Minor Seminary, Yola Adamawa State
- St Joseph's Minor Seminary, Shuwa Adamawa State
- Sacred Heart Minor Seminary, Jauro Yinu Taraba State
- St Paul Minor Seminary, Benin City, Edo State

== Nigerians who have been canonized or beatified ==
- Blessed Cyprian Michael Iwene Tansi, from Anambra State, beatified by Pope John Paul II, 22 March 1998

== Catholic religious congregations founded in Nigeria ==
- Daughters of Divine Love
- New Evangelization Sisters of Mother of Perpetual Help)
- Sons of Mary, Mother of Mercy Congregation
- Daughters of Mary, Mother of Mercy Congregation, founded in 1961 (DMMM).
- Holy Family Fathers and Brothers of the Youth (HFFBY), established in 2003.
- Holy Family Sisters of the Needy
- Missionary Sisters of Divine Mercy, Nnewi, Nigeria
- Sisters of the Eucharistic Heart of Jesus, Ikeja, Lagos-State.
- Sisters of Jesus Crucified, Uratta, Owerri, Imo State
- Missionary sister of Jesus and Mary, Warri

== Missionary societies active in Nigeria ==
- Society of African Missions
- The Spiritans (Congregation of the Holy Spirit, C.S.Sp.)
- The Augustinians (Order of Saint Augustine, O.S.A.)
- Missionary Sisters of Our Lady of Apostles
- St. Louis Sisters
- Salesians of Don Bosco Salesians of Don Bosco (SDB)]
- Missionaries of Africa
- Pontifical Mission Societies of Nigeria (PMS Nigeria)
- Aid to the Church in Need
- Missionary Society of St. Paul
- Order of Preachers (Dominicans)
- Order of Discalced Carmelites
- The Franciscans
- Society of Jesus (Jesuits)
- The Cleratian Missionary Fathers
- The Oblates Of St Joseph
- The Redemptorists
- Vocationists The Society of Divine Vocations
- Daughters of St Paul
- (Missionary Sisters of Divine Mercy P. O. Box 611 Nnewi Nigeria. Cell: +2348033802674)
- Oblates of the Virgin Mary
- Missionary Oblates of Mary Immaculate

== Persecution ==
Catholic Church in Nigeria faces severe persecution. According to the CBCN, at least 145 priests have been kidnapped, 11 have been murdered, and four remain missing between 2015 and 2025, though figures provided months later by the Nigerian Church itself show higher numbers of kidnapped priests. Report by the NGO International Society for Civil Liberties and Rule of Law (Intersociety) stated that at least 15 priests were kidnapped between January and August 2025 by Fulani, Boko Haram and other forces. The phenomenon, according to the report, is due to a combination of attacks by jihadist groups and organized criminal gangs operating for profit, with priests being victims of both violent ambushes and financial extortion. In December 2025 a report by the Nigerian Catholic Bishops' Conference found that over the past decade at least 212 priests had been kidnapped in Nigeria. According to the document, 183 of these were eventually released, while 12 were kidnapped and three died as a result of their captivity. Four priests were still unacounted for at the time the study was released. However, according to Aid to the Church in Need, data from 18 dioceses was not included in the report, wherefore the actual number may be higher.

In Nigeria, the Boko Haram insurgency aims to establish an Islamic state in Nigeria. This has resulted in the persecution of Christians in Nigeria. There has been a tendency of "mischaracterisation of the situation as civil conflict". The number of Nigerian Christians killed for their identification as Christians accounts for 70% of those being killed for their faith worldwide. The academic Journal of African Studies and Sustainable Development published a paper in 2020 that noted that since 2015, over 12,000 Christians have been killed in Nigeria. Christian human rights organisations, such as Global Christian Relief have provided higher figures, such as documenting in 2023 that 52,250 Christians were murdered for their faith in the previous fourteen years. In 2025, this garnered international attention with United States president Donald Trump vowing military action in Nigeria if the attacks against Christians did not subside; on Christmas Day 2025, the United States targeted ISIS cells in Nigeria.

In November 2025 the Catholic Bishops of Nigeria issued a statement saying that "it is a matter of grave concern that several predominantly Christian communities, particularly in the Northern and middle belt regions of the country, have come under repeated and brutal attacks, resulting in heavy casualties and the tragic loss of many Christian lives" and adding that "Such prolonged unbearable conditions have given credence to allegations of ‘genocide’ in some quarters. Yet, mindful of the sacred dignity and inestimable worth of every human life, we are equally deeply concerned that Muslims and many other innocent citizens of diverse ethnic backgrounds have also been victims of this same cruelty that continues to desecrate our common humanity."

In February 2026 the Catholic Secretariat of Nigeria, which is the administrative wing of the Nigerian Bishops' Conference, published a statement criticising the Government for inaction following a wave of violence that left 160 dead and many more abducted in the Middle Belt. "The recurring carnage has become a stain on the conscience of our nation. How can it be justified that, outside of war, over 160 innocent civilians were slaughtered in one coordinated attack in Woro, Kwara State? How do we explain the repeated killings and abductions in Agwara and Tungan Gero in Niger State, the wiping out of entire farming communities in Katsina and Kaduna, and the ongoing violence in Borno? This is not ‘instability’ but a massacre allowed by silence and a betrayal of every Nigerian’s right to live in peace", said the statement, as quoted by Aid to the Church in Need. The article points out that the majority of the victims were not Christians, but Muslims who refused to embrace a radical version of Islam proposed by the terrorists.

In August 2026 the Catholic bishops of Nigeria again called on the Government to act to stem endemic violence in the country, following a series of apparently unrelated massacres.

== See also ==
- List of Catholic dioceses in Nigeria This page also gives quick access to many internet links to official websites of the Nigerian dioceses.
- List of cathedrals in Nigeria
- List of saints from Africa
- Religion in Nigeria
- Christianity in Nigeria
