= Valerian Okeke =

Catholic Archbishop of Onitsha Archdiocese

His Grace, The Most Reverend Valerian Maduka Okeke
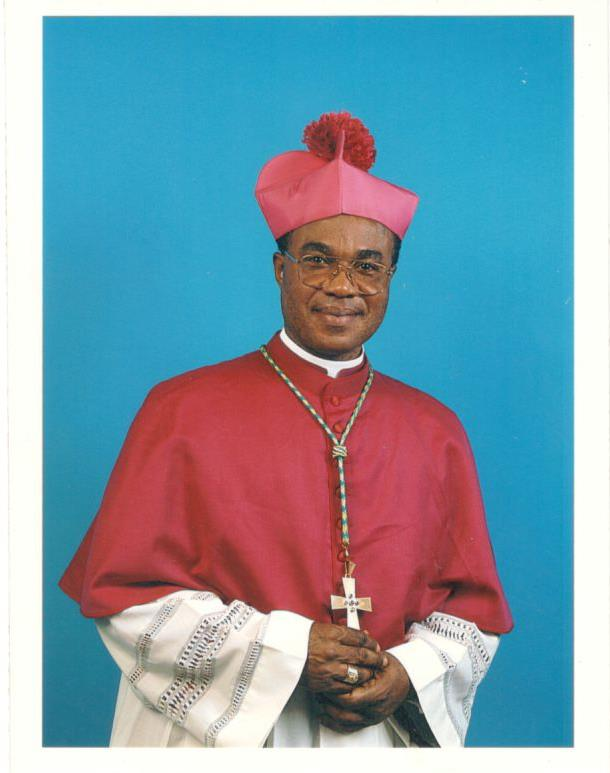
- Native name: Maduka
- Archdiocese: Onitsha
- Province: Onitsha
- See: Onitsha Ecclesiastical Province
- Predecessor: Albert Obiefuna

Orders
- Ordination: 11 July 1981 by Francis Arinze
- Consecration: 9 February 2002 by Osvaldo Padilla

Personal details
- Born: Valerian Maduka; 20 October 1953 Umudioka, Anambra, Nigeria
- Denomination: Catholic
- Residence: Basilica of the Most Holy Trinity, Onitsha
- Parents: Gabriel and Catherine Okeke
- Education: Christ the King College, Onitsha All Hallows Seminary, Onitsha Bigard Memorial Seminary, Enugu
- Motto: Ut Vitam Habeant (Jn 10:10)
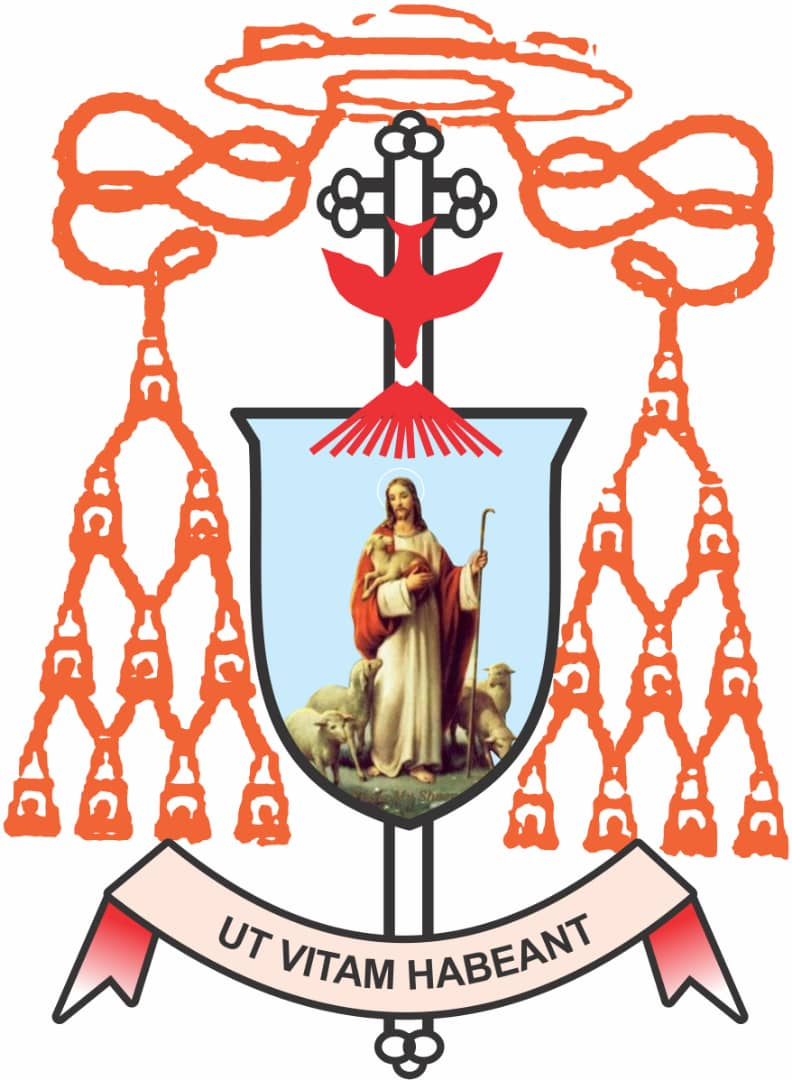
- Coat of arms
- Website: archbishopvalokeke.org

Valerian Maduka Okeke// (born 20 October 1953) is a Nigerian Catholic prelate who has served as Archbishop of Onitsha since 2003.

== Biography ==
Okeke was born in Umudioka, Anambra State and ordained to the priesthood on 11 July 1981 by Cardinal Francis Arinze, who was then the Archbishop of Onitsha. After his ordination, he worked as a parish vicar at Holy Trinity Cathedral, Onitsha, under Emmanuel Otteh. Valerian Okeke later served as parish priest of Our Lady of Seven Sorrows' Parish, Umuoji (1983- 1986).

He served as the Rector of the provincial seminary, Bigard Memorial Seminary, Enugu, before he was appointed the co-adjutor Archbishop of Onitsha by Pope John Paul II, on 28 November 2001. He was consecrated on 9 February 2002 by Archbishop Osvaldo Padilla.

Since his ordination, Okeke has served on various committees of the Catholic Bishops' Conference of Nigeria and as chairman of the conference Pastoral Affairs Department, Catholic Secretariat of Nigeria in 2017. Presently, he is the chairman of the Catholic Bishop's Conference commission on Seminaries.

He oversaw the increase of the number of parishes in Onitsha Archdiocese from 70 to 183 over 15 years. He has seen to the dedication of many churches in the archdiocese. He has priests on loan to the diocese of Belleville, Illinois. His contacts extend to the Igbo Community in Ozone Park, Queens, New York, where he drew over 400 mostly Igbo for a Confirmation service.

Okeke personally visits the Onitsha prisons three times every year. The Federal Government of Nigeria through the Chief of Prisoner services honored him with the prestigious award of grand patron of Nigerian correctional services. Through the Archbishop Valerian Okeke Foundation (AVOF) he is able to send young ambassadors of good will to countries like Ghana.

Archbishop Valerian encouraged the state government to return the mission schools in Anambra State to the church. When the Schools were eventually returned by the Governor Peter Obi-led administration, Archbishop Valerian spearheaded the massive reconstruction and rehabilitation of Mission schools which were taken away from the Church by the military government after the civil war. He initiated policies for proper holistic formation of the individual. These policies included training of teachers, training of Priests as specialists in education fields, school science competition, re-introduction of priests as manager/principals to the secondary schools and proper religious education These unprecedented reforms in Mission Schools under his watch have resulted in Mission schools winning laurels in both local, national and international competitions.

Under his watch, the first university was established in the commercial city of Onitsha. it was named after Bishop Joseph Shanahan to pay tribute to the contributions of the early missionaries who brought faith and introduced formal education [19].

== Publications ==
- The nature and identity of the church : Nigerian theological perspectives, Nsukka (2002).
- Christian witness : essays in memory of Archbishop Stephen Nweke Ezeanya, with Valerian Maduka. Enugu: Delta Publications (2003).
- Go, make disciples of all nations. Enugu: Snaap Press (2006)
- Bigard diamond jubilee reflections. Nsukka: Fulladu (2000).
- Pastoral Letters -
1. That they may have life (2004)
2. The Measure of love (2005)
3. Our Glorious Heritage (2005)
4. If only you have faith (2006)
5. Go Make Disciple of All Nations (2006)
6. You and the Common Good (2007)
7. The Family and human life (2008)
8. Our Greatest Legacy (2009)
9. The Splendour of Prayer (2010)
10. Gratitude (2011)
11. The dignity of Labour (2012)
12. Living Hope (2013)
13. Catholic Education and National Development (2014)
14. Democracy and Christian Values (2015)
15. Blessed are the Merciful (2016)
16. Blessed are the Peacemakers (2017)
17. Mary Our Mother (2018)
18. The Holy Eucharist: Our strength ( 2019)
19. The Sacraments; Our treasure (2020)
20. The Priesthood; Gift and Sacrifice ( 2021)
21. Holy Spirit: Man's Helper and Friend ( 2022)
22. The Hour of Glory; Suffering in the Life of a Christian (2023)
