= Cathedral Basilica of the Most Holy Trinity, Onitsha =

The Basilica of the Most Holy Trinity
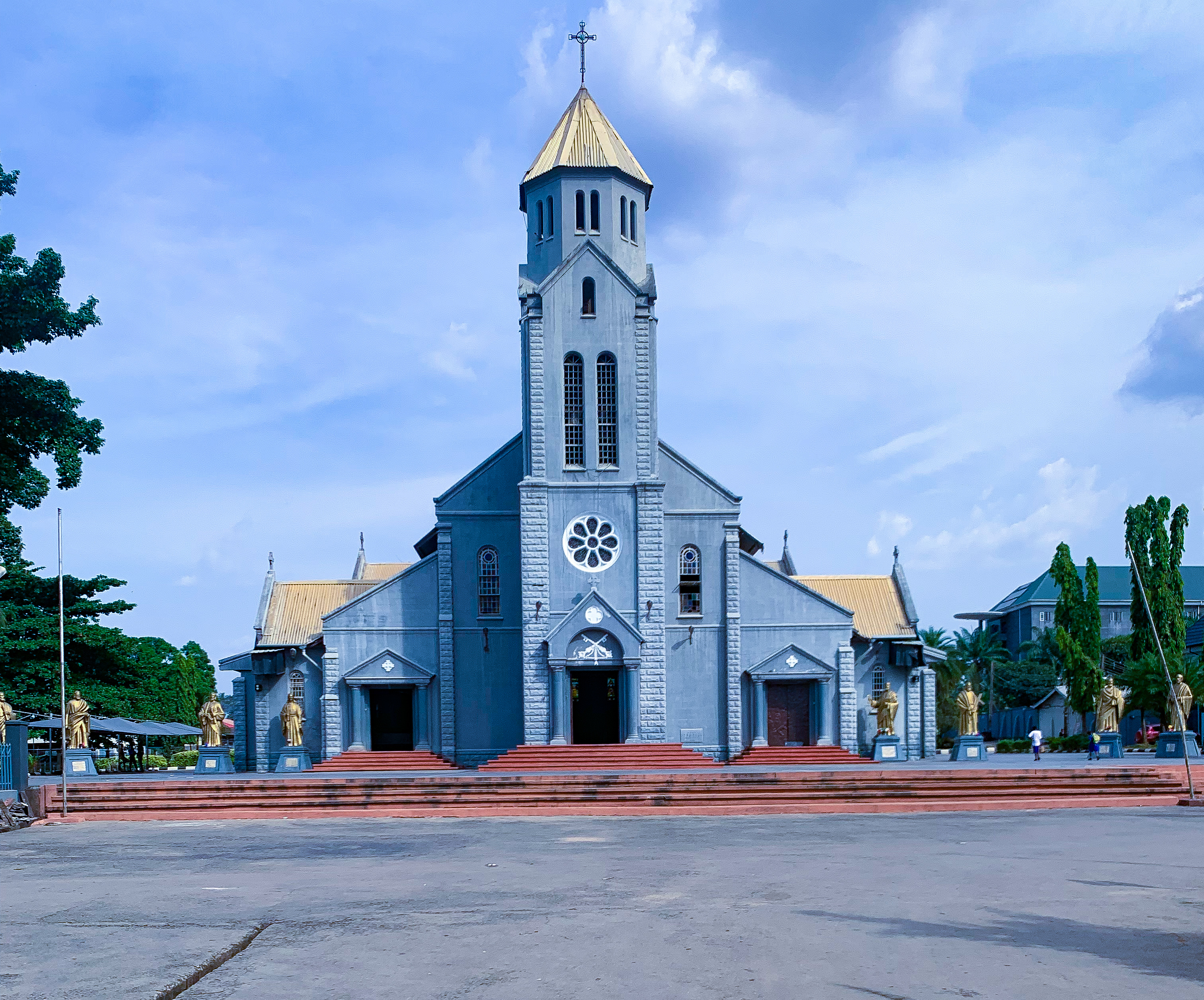
- The Basilica of the Most Holy Trinity
- Location: Onitsha
- Country: Nigeria
- Denomination: Roman Catholic

History
- Founder: Bishop Joseph Shanahan

Administration
- Archdiocese: Roman Catholic Archdiocese of Onitsha

Clergy
- Archbishop: Valerian Okeke
- Rector: Rev Fr Johnbosco Ezika

The Cathedral Basilica of the Most Holy Trinity is a Roman Catholic cathedral and minor basilica dedicated to the Trinity and located in Onitsha, Nigeria. The basilica is seat of the Archdiocese of Onitsha. It contains the relics of Blessed Cyprian Michael Iwene Tansi, as well as the tombs of Bishop Joseph Shanahan and Archbishops Charles Heerey, Stephen Ezeanya and Albert Obiefuna. It is the only basilica in Nigeria.

== History ==
In December 1935, when Bishop Joseph Shanahan arrived in Onitsha from Ireland to bless the edifice, the newly built Cathedral that Shanahan saw was heart stopping in its splendor. The basilica which was then the cathedral stands on elevated piece of land which is part of the 20 hectares made available for Fr. Lutz and his team by Obi Anazonwu and chiefs of Onitsha on 6 January 1886.

Till 1930 what served as the central place of worship for the vicariate was the dual purpose building erected in 1914, the present holy Trinity primary school. The Holy Trinity cathedral was built between 1930 and 1935. In 1932, Bishop Shanahan handed over the mantle of leadership of the church to Bishop Charles Heerey on account of ill health especially the eyes. He retired and left for Ireland to allow the new Bishop a free hand. Shanahan was invited back for the jubilee and a major activity of the jubilee was the blessing of the cathedral.

The cathedral like many other houses in Onitsha was battered during the Nigerian Civil War. The post war reconstruction happened to collide with the early period of the recommendations of the Vatican ll council especially regarding the liturgy. So the church in Onitsha while repairing the damages to the Holy Trinity cathedral reconstructed it to be in tune with the new liturgy.

In 1994, the Archbishop of Onitsha Albert Kanenechukwu Obiefuna was transferred to Onitsha to take over the ailing Archbishop Stephen N. Ezeanya. Responding to the ever soaring number of worshipers who throng the Holy Trinity cathedral, Archbishop Obiefuna undertook to enlarge and expand accommodation in the cathedral. The conclusion of the modification was made to coincide with the centenary of the arrival of Bishop Shanahan in Onitsha. Thus on 5 December 2002 the work of the modification was brought to an end by the re-dedication of the reconstructed cathedral. The Holy Trinity cathedral has been a scene of many memorable occasions. Notable was the return and the reburial of the remains of Bishop Shanahan in 1956, Archbishop Heerey in 1967 and Archbishop Ezeanya in 1996 and Archbishop Obiefuna in 2011. An indisputably unique treasure in the cathedral is the relics of Blessed Michael Cyprian Iwene Tansi who was beatified by Pope John Paul II in 1998.

Holy Trinity cathedral was elevated and promoted to a minor Basilica by Pope Benedict XVI on 28 May 2007 under the episcopacy of Archbishop Valerian Maduka Okeke.

== Timeline ==
- Building completed – 1935
- Cathedral consecrated – 5 December 1960
- Basilica decreed – 28 May 2007
- Basilica erected – 8 March 2008
