= Francis Arinze =

Nigerian Catholic cardinal (born 1932)

His Eminence Francis Arinze
- Cardinal; Cardinal Bishop of Velletri–Segni; Prefect Emeritus of the Congregation for Divine Worship and the Discipline of the Sacraments
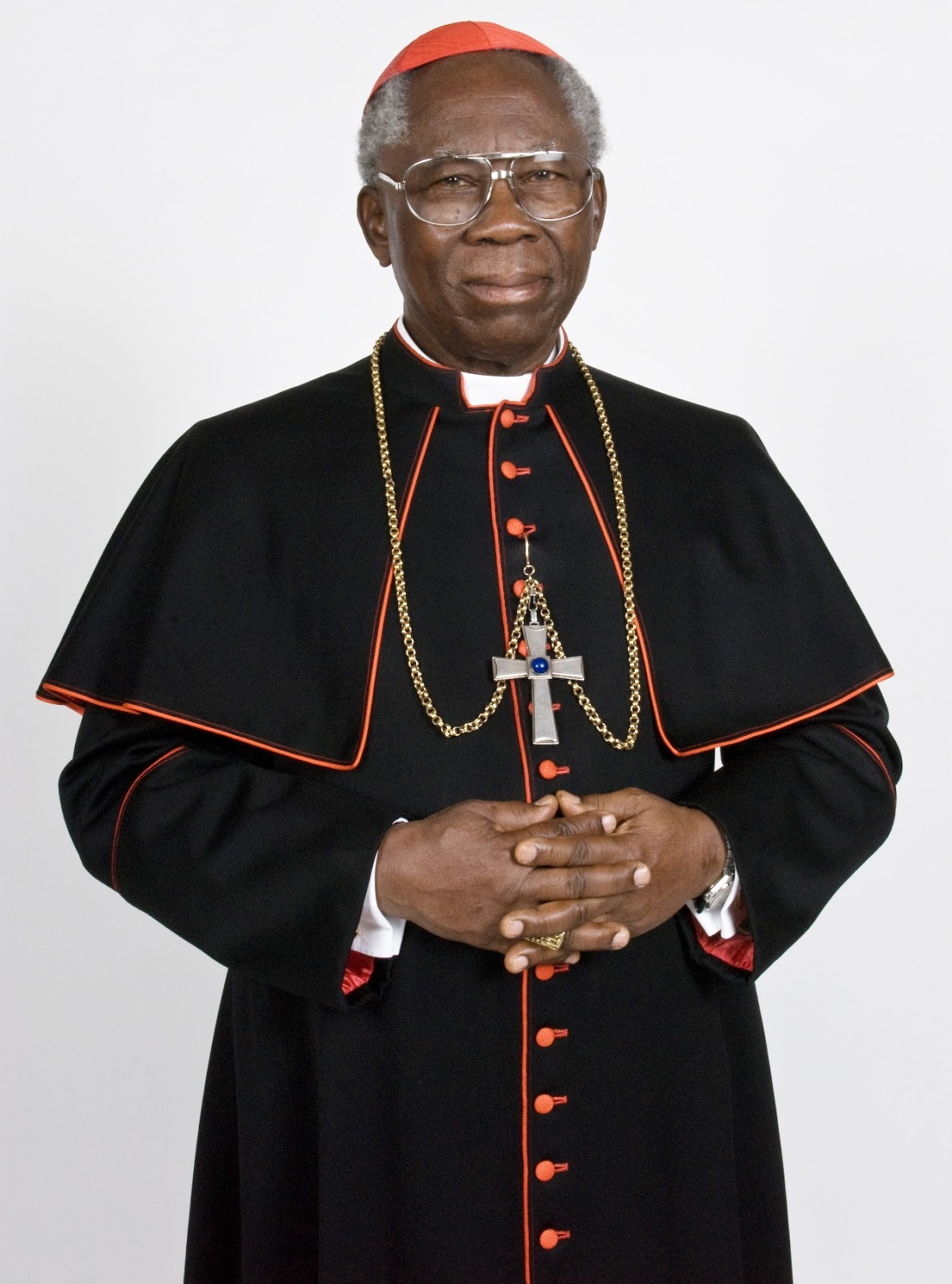
- See: Velletri-Segni
- Appointed: 1 October 2002
- Term ended: 9 December 2008
- Predecessor: Jorge Arturo Augustin Medina Estévez
- Successor: Antonio Cañizares Llovera
- Other post: Cardinal-Bishop of Velletri-Segni
- Previous posts: Coadjutor bishop of Onitsha (1965–1967); Titular bishop of Fissiana (1965–1967); Archbishop of Onitsha (1967–1985); President of the Catholic Bishops' Conference of Nigeria (1979–1984); Pro-Prefect of the Pontifical Council for Interreligious Dialogue (1984–1985); Cardinal deacon of San Giovanni della Pigna (1985–1996); President of the Pontifical Council for Interreligious Dialogue (1985–2002); Cardinal priest of San Giovanni della Pigna (1996–2005)

Orders
- Ordination: 23 November 1958 by Gregorio Pietro Agagianian
- Consecration: 29 August 1965 by Charles Heerey
- Created cardinal: 25 May 1985 by Pope John Paul II
- Rank: Cardinal deacon (1985–1996); Cardinal priest (1996–2005); Cardinal bishop (since 2005)

Personal details
- Born: 1 November 1932 (age 93) Onitsha, Colony of Nigeria, British Empire
- Motto: Regnum Christi floreat (lit. 'May the Kingdom of Christ flourish')
- Coat of arms

Styles of Francis Arinze
- Reference style: His Eminence; The Most Reverend Eminence
- Spoken style: Your Eminence
- Religious style: Cardinal
- Informal style: Cardinal

Francis Arinze (//; born 1 November 1932) is a Nigerian prelate of the Catholic Church, who served as the Prefect of the Secretariat for Non-Christians from 1984 to 2002 and Prefect of the Congregation for Divine Worship and the Discipline of the Sacraments from 2002 to 2008. He previously served as the Archbishop of Onitsha from 1967 to 1985 and as the president of the Catholic Bishops' Conference of Nigeria from 1979 to 1984. Arinze is the current Cardinal Bishop of Velletri–Segni since 2005 and was one of the principal advisors to Pope John Paul II and was considered papabile at the 2005 Papal conclave. According to Cardinal John Onaiyekan, Arinze is the only surviving council father among the few who went from Nigeria to the Second Vatican Council.

Born in Eziowelle, Anambra State, Nigeria, Arinze was made a cardinal in 1985 and named Cardinal-bishop of Velletri-Segni in 2005.

== Early life, family, and education ==
Francis Arinze was born on 1 November 1932 as the third out of seven children. Born in Eziowelle, Anambra State, Southeastern Nigeria, his father was Arinze Nwankwu (later baptised as Joseph) and his mother was Bernadette Mgbafor Arinze (née Ekwoanya). He has three brothers: Christopher, Linus, and Faustin; and three sisters: Cecilia, Victoria, and Catherine. Arinze's birth name, Anizoba (meaning "May the land save, may the spirit save, may the earth spirit save you") was formed from the name of the spirit called Ani, who cares for the earth, the traditions and customs of the people according to the African religion, which the family practiced until Francis became nine years old on 1 November 1941, when he was baptised as Francis into the Catholic Church by Father Cyprian Tansi, whom he would later serve as an altar server. He also developed interest to the priesthood but his father opposed him citing "you will not become a priest because if you become a priest, you will not marry and you won't have children and you will be hearing all the bad things people do in your two ears and that is not good".

Arinze, along his siblings attended the missionary school. Parents saw how the missionaries dominated the society and their influence on children were positive, they baptised their children. Arinze's two elder brothers and his sisters were also baptised. Arinze completed his primary school at St. Anthony's Dunukofia. The following year, in 1947 at age 15, he was admitted into All Hallows Seminary, Onitsha (then in Nnewi but was part of now Bigard Memorial Seminary Enugu), where he studied philosophy and graduated in 1952. In 1955, he went to Rome to study theology at the Pontifical Urban University.

On 23 November 1958, Arinze was ordained by Gregorio Pietro Agagianian, who later became a cardinal. He remained in Rome, where he completed his master's degree in theology in 1958 and his doctorate in sacred theology, summa cum laude in 1960. His doctoral theses, "Igbo Sacrifice as an introduction to the Catechesis of Holy Mass" was highly cited by scholars and was later published into a book in 1970 by the Ibadan University Press under the title Sacrifice in Ibo Religion. From 1961 to 1962, Arinze served as the regional director of Catholic education for eastern Nigeria, as well as taught liturgy, logic, and basic philosophy at Bigard Memorial Seminary. He went to London to further his formal education at the Institute of Education, where he bagged a diploma in 1964.

== Episcopacy ==
On 6 July 1965, Pope Paul VI appointed Arinze as bishop of the Titular diocese of Fissiana and coadjutor to Charles Heerey, the Archbishop of Onitsha, hence making him the youngest Catholic bishop in the world when Heerey consecrated him on 29 August 1965 at the age of 32. He attended the final session of the Second Vatican Council in 1965. When Heerey died on 6 February 1967, Pope Paul VI appointed Arinze to succeed him as archbishop on 26 June 1967. He became the first native African to head a diocese. (Note: Although Arinze was the titular bishop and coadjutor to Heerey, he was a titular archbishop, therefore he didn't have the right to succeed the office of the archbishop of Onitsha upon Heerey's resignation or death.)

The Nigerian Civil War broke out few days after the episcopacy of Arinze began. Because the Archdiocese of Onitsha was located in the secessionist state Biafra, he became a refugee, fleeing to Adazi and then Amichi, where he stayed until the war ended in 1970. He recalled supervising the distribution of relief materials to other refugees as well as the sick and hungry Biafrans. He was known to have kept the diocese independent of the warring factions. At the end of the war, the Nigerian government deported all foreign missionaries working in the archdiocese, leaving only the native clergy and religious, who were few in number. Catholic schools were also confiscated.

When the war ended, he continued as the archbishop and the president of the Catholic Bishop's Conference of Nigeria (CBCN). An advocate of interfaith dialogue, Arinze was known to work well with Muslims in Nigeria, hence Pope John Paul II appointed him as pro president of the Vatican City's Secretariat for non-Christian believers (present Dicastery for Interreligious Dialogue). On 9 March 1985, Arinze resigned as archbishop of Onitsha.

=== Episcopal anniversaries ===
In August 2025, Arinze was praised by Peter Obi on his 60th episcopal anniversary, via Twitter, as "a living witness to faith and renewal in the Catholic Church".

== Cardinalate ==
Pope John Paul II named Arinze Cardinal-Deacon of San Giovanni della Pigna in a consistory held on 25 May 1985. He received his cardinal's hat in Rome on 25 May 1985, while Stephen Ezeanya succeeded him as the Archbishop of Onitsha. After ten years he exercised his option to be raised to the rank of cardinal-priest, which Pope John Paul approved on 29 January 1996. Two days after he became a cardinal, Arinze was appointed president of the Secretariat for Non-Christians, which was renamed the Pontifical Council for Interreligious Dialogue in 1988.

He served in various related capacities including as the president of the Special Assembly for Africa of the Synod of Bishops. He also received honours in this capacity: On 24 October 1999 he received a gold medallion from the International Council of Christians and Jews for his outstanding achievements in inter-faith relations. He traveled extensively and became a popular speaker in the United States.

Arinze was a member of the Committee of the Great Jubilee in 2000. In that capacity, he worked closely with individual bishops and priests throughout the world in preparation for the rare celebration. On 1 October 2002, Pope John Paul II named him prefect of the Congregation for Divine Worship and the Discipline of the Sacraments.

=== Conclaves ===
From early 2000, observers reportedly suggest that Arinze might become the successor of Pope John Paul II, hence making him the first African-born Pope in 1500 years, since Pope Gelasius (492–496). Other African Popes were Pope Miltiades (311–314) and Pope Victor I (183–203)

When Pope John Paul II died on 2 April 2005, all major Vatican officials were dissolved automatically, including Arinze's position. Among the 115 cardinal electors, he was the only African cardinal considered papabile for the 2005 papal conclave, where Cardinal Ratzinger, later Pope Benedict XVI was elected on 19 April 2005. Pope Benedict XVI retained him as the prefect of the Congregation for Divine Worship on 21 April 2005. On 25 April of the same year, the Pope elevated him to the position of a Cardinal Bishop, heading the Suburbicarian Diocese of Velletri-Segni, a post Pope Benedict XVI held before he was elected Pope. On 9 December 2008, Arinze retired as the prefect of the Congregation of Divine Worship.

== Notable views ==
=== Interfaith dialogue ===
Although Arinze, like Pope John Paul II, was known to be very conservative with the Catholic doctrine, he is an advocate for interfaith dialogue. He asserted that every religion have to adapt to their way of seeking salvation. He reportedly also said that Buddhists, Muslims, and Jews can get to heaven.

In July 2009, he delivered a major speech promoting interreligious dialogue at The City Club of Cleveland.

=== Eucharist ===
In May 2018, he addressed the ongoing controversies about granting access to the Holy Eucharist. He objected to any interpretation of Pope Francis' Amoris laetitia that would allow a Catholic remarried without an annulment to receive Communion as an act of mercy, saying that Christ saw that condition as adultery and "We cannot be more merciful than Christ." With respect to the proposal endorsed by many German bishops to allow the Protestant spouses of Catholics to receive communion, he said that it was not a question of "hospitality" and the celebration of Mass is "not an ecumenical service".

=== Vatican Council II ===
In 2009, Arinze gave a commencement address at the Augustine Institute in Denver. He actively teaches Catechism of the Catholic Church via Familyland TV to the Americas, the Philippines, Africa, and Europe. He has produced over 1,700 television programs with the Apostolate for Family Consecration. The programs cover almost all of Pope John Paul II's encyclicals and apostolic letters, the teachings of the Second Vatican Council, and many other topics.

=== Vocation ===
On 13 June 2025 in a meeting with Nigerian students in Rome, Arinze clarified his view on Christian vocation, asserting that "every person has a unique vocation, understood as God's specific plan for their life". He also stated that "vocation is not limited to the priesthood or religious life, but also to any profession ranging from law, engineering, music, or academia".

=== Nigerian politics ===
On 30 April 2025, Arinze, after welcoming some priests at his residence in the Vatican, charged the priests to help in reducing pain in Nigeria through giving the congregation messages of hope. He labelled Nigerian politicians as "a sad group".

== Distinctions and legacy ==
Arinze has received honorary degrees from universities including the University of Nigeria in 1986, the Catholic University of America in 1998, Wake Forest University in 1999, the University of Santo Tomas in 2001, the University of Notre Dame in 2003, the University of St. Mary of the Lake in 2003, and Seton Hall University in 2005.

On 5 October 2021, a center for peace and reconciliation was established in Arinze's name in Nigeria. In 1985, Arinze was awarded the chieftaincy title of the "Ochudouwa" of Eziowelle, his hometown. He was listed along Victorinus Youn Kong-hi, Daniel Verstraete and José de Jesús Sahagún de la Parra as the four surviving Council Fathers of the Second Vatican Council held between 1962 and 1965.

== Bibliography ==
- Sacrifice in Ibo Religion (University of California Press, 1970)
- The Church in Dialogue: Walking With Other Believers (1990)
- Meeting Other Believers: The Risks and Rewards of Interreligious Dialogue (1998)
- Religions for Peace: A Call for Solidarity to the Religions of the World (2002)
- The Evangelizing Parish (Ignatius Press, 2018)
- The Family Catechism on Tape, Apostolate for Family Consecration
- Divine Providence: God's Design in Your Life (2005)
- Building Bridges: Interreligious Dialogue on the Path to World Peace (2004)
- Cardinal Reflections: Active Participation and the Liturgy (2005)
- The Holy Eucharist (Our Sunday Visitor, 2001) ISBN 0-87973-978-9
- Celebrating the Holy Eucharist (2006)
- Religions for Peace (Darton, Longman & Todd, 2002)
- God's Invisible Hand: The Life and Work of Francis Cardinal Arinze, Ignatius Press, 2006
- Great Figures in Salvation History: David and Solomon, an interview with Cardinal Arinze and Roy Schoemann, Ignatius Press, 2006

Catholic Church titles
New title	— TITULAR — Bishop of Fissiana; 1965 – 1967	Succeeded by Leo Rajendram Antony
Preceded by Charles Heerey	Archbishop of Onitsha; 1967 – 1985	Succeeded by Stephen Nweke Ezeanya
Preceded by Jean Jadot	President of the Pontifical Council for Interreligious Dialogue; 1985 – 2002	Succeeded by Michael L. Fitzgerald
New title	Cardinal Deacon of S. Giovanni della Pigna; 1985 – 1996	Succeeded by Raffaele Farina
New title	Cardinal Priest of S. Giovanni della Pigna pro hac vice 1996 – 2005	Succeeded by Raffaele Farina
Preceded by Jorge Medina Estévez	Prefect of the Congregation for Divine Worship and the Discipline of the Sacraments; 2002 – 2008	Succeeded by Antonio Cañizares Llovera
Preceded by Joseph Ratzinger	Cardinal Bishop of Velletri-Segni; 2005 –	Incumbent
