= CBCN =

CBCN may refer to:

- Catholic Bishops Conference of Nigeria, an Episcopal Conference of the Roman Catholic Church
- CBCN-FM, the North Bay rebroadcaster of CBCS-FM
- Chiropractic Board of Clinical Nutrition, a specialty council of the American Chiropractic Association
