= Regina Pacis Model Secondary School =

Secondary school in Anambra State, Nigeria

- 21 Awka Road, Onitsha, Anambra State; Nigeria

Information
- Type: Public single sex secondary boarding and day school
- Motto: "In Caritate et Fide Laborare" lit. 'In Charity and Faith to Work'
- Established: 1962; 64 years ago
- Educational authority: Anambra State Ministry of Education
- Director: Rev. Fr. Jerome-Melvin Obiekezie
- Years: JSS1–SS3
- Gender: girls
- Campus: Urban
- Website: reginapacisschool.com.ng

Regina Pacis Model Secondary School is a Catholic girls high school in Onitsha, Anambra State, Nigeria. It is operated by the Roman Catholic Archdiocese of Onitsha and was founded in 1962 by Archbishop Charles Heerey.

== History ==
The school was founded by Charles Heerey, the then Archbishop of Onitsha in 1962. Construction of school building began in 1966 when Fr. A. Byne was appointed as the director of the centre by the archbishop.

== Academics ==
The school was invited in 2023 by the Oxford Royale Academy to participate in their summer programme games in the United Kingdom.

In 2018, a team of five students from Regina Pacis developed the Fake Drug Detection app (FD-Detector) which won them the Junior Gold Awards in the World Technovation Challenge in Silicon Valley, US. The students were Promise Nnalue, Jessica Osita, Nwabuaku Ossai, Adaeze Onuigbo, and Vivian Okoye.

In 2023, a team invented "Smart Sticks", a device for blind people to detect obstacles not less than 120 cm away from a blind person. It was displayed during the pastoral visit of Valerian Okeke. The invention also received recognition from the Obi of Onitsha Alfred Achebe.
