= Charles Heerey =

Irish Catholic prelate

The Most Reverend Charles Heerey C.S.Sp.
- Archbishop of Onitsha
- Church: Roman Catholic Church
- Archdiocese: Onitsha
- Appointed: 24 January 1927
- Installed: 11 May 1985
- Term ended: 6 February 1967
- Predecessor: Joseph Shanahan
- Successor: Francis Arinze
- Previous posts: Titular Bishop of Balanea (1927); Coadjutor Vicar Apostolic of Southern Nigeria (1927); Vicar Apostolic of Southern Nigeria (1931)

Orders
- Ordination: 24 September 1921
- Consecration: 29 May 1927 by Joseph Shanahan

Personal details
- Born: 29 November 1890 Castlerahan, Ireland
- Died: February 6, 1967 (aged 76) Nigeria
- Buried: Cathedral Basilica of the Most Holy Trinity, Onitsha
- Education: Blackrock College; Rockwell College; Holy Ghost Missionary College, Kimmage Manor, Dublin; University College Dublin (BA)

Charles Heerey (29 November 1890—6 February 1967) was an Irish Catholic prelate who served as the Archbishop of the Archdiocese of Onitsha from 18 April 1950 until his death on 6 February 1967.

Born in Castlerahan, Ireland, Heerey attended Blackrock College and Rockwell College for his elementary education, and St. Mary's Rathmines and Holy Ghost Missionary College, Kimmage Manor, Dublin for his secondary education. He graduated with a BA from the University College Dublin, and was ordained a priest in Dublin on 24 September 1921 by the Congregation of the Holy Spirit.

After his ordination, Heerey moved to Nigeria in 1922. In 1927, he was appointed as the Titular Bishop of Balanea and the Coadjutor Vicar Apostolic of Southern Nigeria in order to help Bishop Joseph Shanahan. In 1931, he succeeded Bishop Shanahan as the Vicar Apostolate until the vicariate was elevated to an Archdiocese in 1950, he became the Archbishop of the newly created Onitsha. He died while in office in 1967 and was succeeded by future Cardinal Francis Arinze.

== Biography ==
Heerey was born on 29 November 1890 in Castlerahan, Ireland. He had his primary education at Blackrock College and Rockwell College while his secondary education at St. Mary's Rathmines and Holy Ghost Missionary College, Kimmage Manor, Dublin. He further went to the University College Dublin, where he obtained his bachelor's degree. He was ordained priest on 24 September 1921 by the Congregation of the Holy Spirit. On 24 January 1927, Heerey was appointed as the Coadjutor Vicar Apostolic of Southern Nigeria and the Titular Bishop of Balanea. He was consecrated on 29 May 1927. He served as Council Father during the Second Vatican Council. On 21 May 1931, he succeeded Bishop Joseph Shanahan as the Vicar Apostolic of Southern Nigeria. The vicariate was elevated as the Archdiocese of Onitsha and Heerey became its bishop, a position he held from 18 April 1950 until his death on 6 February 1967. He was succeeded by Francis Arinze.

During his episcopacy, Heerey founded several educational institutions in the Southern Nigeria, among them, All Hallows Seminary, Onitsha and Bigard Memorial Seminary, Enugu in 1924; Christ the King College, Onitsha on 2 February 1933, Holy Rosary College, Enugu in 1935 and is run by the Missionary Sisters of the Holy Rosary, Sisters of the Immaculate Heart of Mary, Mother of Christ in 1937, Queen of the Rosary College, Onitsha on 7 October 1942; Mater Amabilis Secondary School, Umuoji and Regina Pacis Model Secondary School, Onitsha in 1962. He also founded the Catholic Women Organization (CWO). According to Daily Sun, Heerey was known for fighting slavery and promoting girl's education.

Catholic Church titles
Preceded by Matthew Gibney	— TITULAR — Bishop of Balanea; 1927 – 1950	Succeeded by Edward Francis Joseph Schlotterback, O.S.F.S.
Preceded by Joseph Shanahan	Vicars Apostolic of Southern Nigeria; 1931 – 1934	superseded
New title	Archbishop of Onitsha; 1950 – 1967	Succeeded by Francis Arinze
