= Cyprian Michael Iwene Tansi =

Igbo Nigerian priest (1903–1964)

Blessed Cyprian Michael Iwene Tansi OCSO
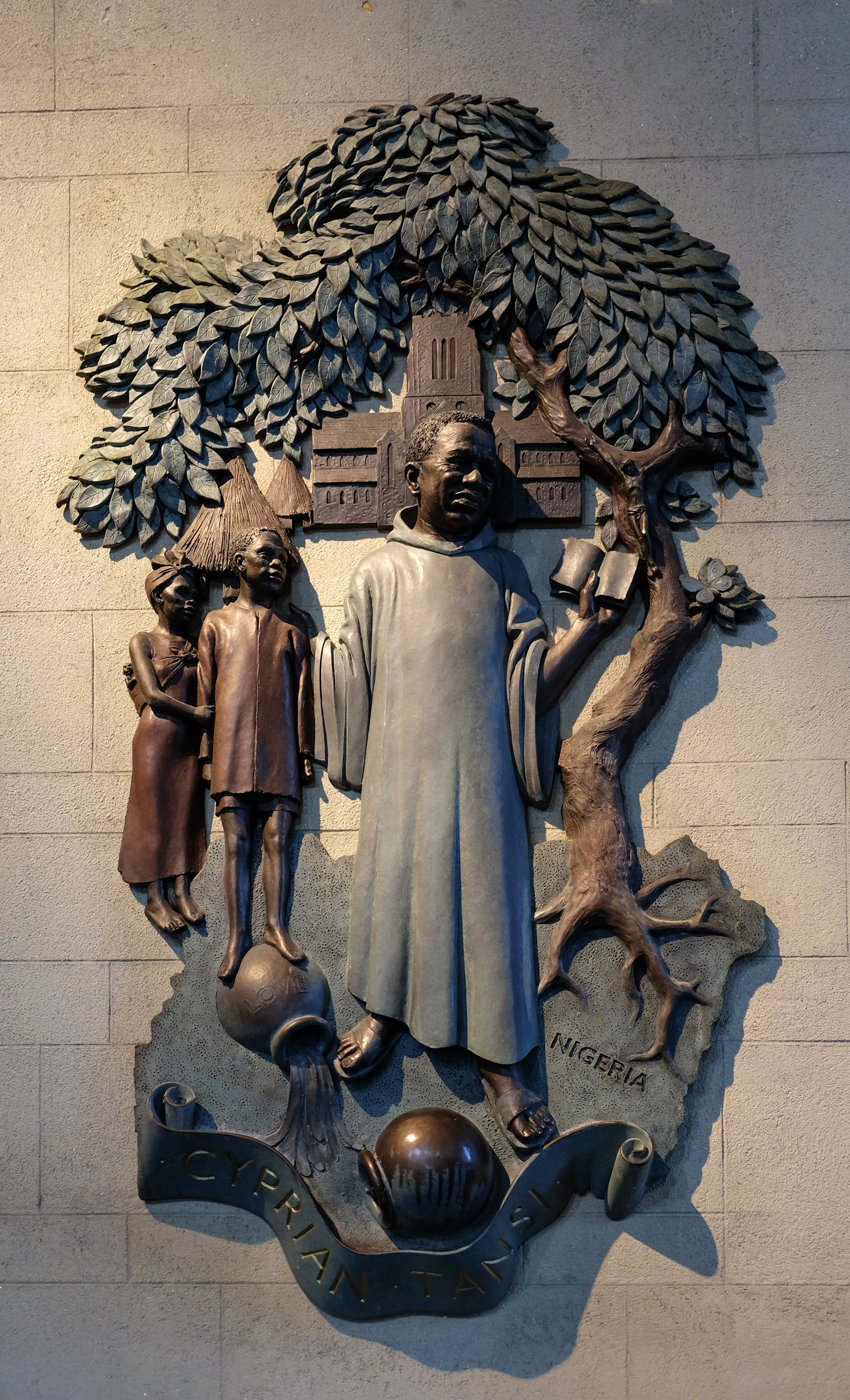
- Sculpture of Tansi mounted on the wall of Mount St Bernard Abbey

Priest and Monk
- Born: September 1903; Aguleri, Southern Nigeria Protectorate
- Died: 20 January 1964 (aged 60); Leicester, England
- Venerated in: Catholic Church
- Beatified: 22 March 1998 by Pope John Paul II
- Major shrine: Cathedral Basilica of the Most Holy Trinity, Onitsha & Mount St Bernard Abbey, Coalville, Leicestershire
- Feast: 20 January

Cyprian Michael Iwene Tansi //, OCSO (September 1903 – 20 January 1964) was an Igbo Nigerian priest of the Catholic Church who worked in the Archdiocese of Onitsha and later became a Trappist monk at Mount Saint Bernard Monastery in England.

On 22 March 1998, he was beatified by Pope John Paul II. His feast day is 20 January.

== Birth and historical background ==
Tansi was born in September 1903, in an area of Nigeria under the control of the Royal Niger Company (RNC). The RNC maintained a trading outpost in Aguleri, purchasing palm oil from local farmers to sell abroad. Relations between the local population and the foreign company were often strained. Michael's father, Tabansi of Igbezunu, was once taken hostage by the Royal Niger Company and later released.

Michael was the oldest son. His name Iwene meant 'let malice not kill'. His parents were poor farmers; they were not Christian. His mother was sentenced to death by a medicine man because he decided she was responsible for the deaths of several youngsters in the village. After her death from swallowing poison, Iwene's father married again. He and his second wife had four boys and one girl.

When Iwene was a young child, he became permanently blinded in one eye as a result of a mud-fight with other children.

His father sent Iwene to Holy Trinity School in Onitsha, which was run by the Holy Ghost Fathers. Tabansi meant for his son to get a better education that would help lead their family out of poverty. Michael was baptized on 7 July 1913 with the Christian name of Michael. At the school, Michael served as an altar boy and catechist. Upon graduating, he became a teacher, and worked as such from 1919 to 1925, Later, he became headmaster at St. Joseph's school in Aguleri.

== Seminarian ==
At that time, few locals in Nigeria were becoming priests. Most of the clergy were Europeans. While Igbo could become priests, they were subject to strict discipline and were often expelled from seminary for relatively minor lapses. Tansi took asceticism seriously and once fasted to such extremes that he became ill as a result.

Michael attended St. Paul Seminary in Igbariam from 1925 to 1937. His family criticized his entrance to the seminary, because they wanted him to go into business, as his father had planned. There, he developed a particular devotion to the Sacred Heart of Jesus and to the Blessed Virgin Mary.

== Parish priest ==
At that time in Nigeria, almost all priests were foreign missionaries. Few Africans were being ordained to the priesthood. Tansi was ordained a priest for the Archdiocese of Onitsha at the Cathedral Basilica of the Most Holy Trinity in Onitsha on 19 December 1937.

As Black priests became more common, some followed the lifestyle of the foreign missionaries. Monks and nuns also lived more comfortably than most Nigerians, and some people began looking at taking holy orders as a priest, monk or nun as a way to escape poverty.

When he became a parish priest, he lived an austere life in comparison to the priests around him. He built his own home using traditional materials. He would sleep on any bed, even if it was uncomfortable. He would eat even poorer food than what the local people ate, surviving on tiny portions of yam. He went by foot, used bicycles, and sometimes had a motorbike. He also travelled during rainstorms.

Nigerian Catholics were not accustomed to this kind of priest. He became popular in the four parishes he served in: Nnewi, Dunukofia, Akpu/Ajalli, and his home town Aguleri. He organized programs for the needy, taught people building techniques, and was remembered as being kind.

He also stood up against oppression of women within the traditional culture and advised women to fight back against those who would rape or mistreat them. On one occasion, a female parishioner was attacked by a group of males, and she fought back against them. Fr Michael, who was nearby, came on his bicycle and joined with her and fought them until they fled. He then encouraged her to bring the assailants to court, which she did, winning the case against them and forcing them each to pay her four pounds; this case was a milestone in the establishment of women's rights in Nigeria.

He was unyielding in confronting vice among his flock. He had a special interest in preparing young women for marriage. With the help of local nuns, the women were taught about Christian marriage and how to care for the children they would have. He would organize the community to place the bride to be in a special home wherein she would be looked after until she got married. He would not allow men to see their brides before they got married, and if the groom attempted to go there without Fr. Tansi's permission, he could be penalized. He also had a women's group organized, who would enforce disciplines on their own members to avoid premarital sex and deter abortion. He was strict with students who failed to work hard at the parish school. He was known to hide near the school; when he saw students coming late, he would emerge from hiding and penalize them. He was remembered for being a perfectionist, which sometimes caused resentment. Later, his experience as a novice monk gave him insight into his earlier methods and caused him to reconsider.

He also was opposed to some aspects of the traditional pagan culture in Nigeria. Nigerian pagans had murdered his own mother after claiming she was a witch who had caused mischief.

== Trappist monk ==
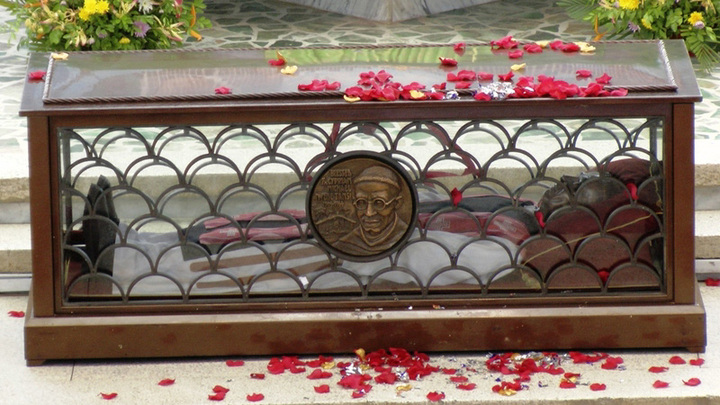
The body of Blessed Cyprian Michael Iwene Tansi on display during his silver jubilee celebration at Holy Family Catholic Church, Festac Town, Lagos

While serving in his last parish, in his own hometown of Aguleri from 1949-1950, Michael began to become attracted to the monastic life. At that time, there were no monasteries established in Nigeria, and the Bishop was interested in the idea of sending some candidates to a monastery in Europe who would become monks in Europe and later return to Nigeria to start up the first Nigerian monastery. Michael and others were selected for this project.

1950 was a jubilee year in the church, and Michael was first sent to on a pilgrimage to Rome. He was then sent to the Trappist abbey of Mount St. Bernard in England. He arrived on 8 June 1950. At the monastery, he entered the novitiate and then took vows, receiving as his monastic name Cyprian, after the Roman martyr. Father Cyprian worked in the refectory and bookbindery, and in the vegetable gardens and orchard. Father Anselm Stark, who knew Fr Cyprian, recalled: "As a person he was very ordinary, very humble, obviously a great man of deep prayer and dedication."

Cyprian was sensitive to criticism, and his novice master was hard on the new monks. This caused him much stress, and it was during this trying time that he understood that he had made some mistakes in Nigeria with the hard discipline and expectations he had placed on those under him. Despite his fears of racial prejudice, he was accepted by most of the other monks. The English winter was also hard on him.

He was commissioned to establish a monastery not in Nigeria, but in neighboring Cameroon. Ill health changed those plans. His health deteriorated, but he accepted death with no complaint. Before he died, he went to Leicester Royal Hospital, and, when he was examined, the doctor came out of the examination and spoke with monastery priest Fr. James, saying: "Can you help me please, Father? This man must be in terrific pain, but he will only admit that he has 'a little pain.'" He died the same day, as a result of arteriosclerosis and a ruptured aneurysm. The date of his death was 20 January 1964.

His body was buried at the monastery in England, but was later interred at the Cathedral Basilica of the Most Holy Trinity, Onitsha, Nigeria.

== Quotations ==
- "Count no one saved, until he is found in heaven" (Onye afuro na enuigwe, si aguyi na)
- "Do not be imitating the whites in everything, strive hard to gain the Kingdom of God. The whites are already in heaven in this world, but you are suffering every want. Are you going to suffer also in the next world: Life on earth could be compared to the journey of a young student who received a slip for a registered parcel, and he had to go to Lagos to claim this parcel. On the way he passed through many beautiful towns, towns with very attractive things in the shops. He started going from one shop to another, stretching his hands to the beautiful things he saw. He stopped so often in these big towns that he almost forgot what he was travelling for. It was after a long time that he ultimately reached Lagos, and when he went to claim the parcel he was told that the parcel had lain in the post for so long without him arriving to claim it that they had finally decided to send it back to the sender."
- "God will give you double for what you give Him"
- "If you want to eat vultures, you may as well eat seven of them, so that when people call you "vulture eater" you really deserve the name. If you want to become a Catholic, live as a faithful Catholic, so that when people see you, they know that you are a Catholic. If you are going to be a Christian at all, you might as well live entirely for God."
- "Whether you like it or not, saving your soul is your own business. If you are weak and fall by the wayside, we shall push you aside and tread on you as we march forward to meet God."
- "She is not 'Onye Bem' (a common Nigerian expression for wife, meaning "a person of my house") but your wife, your better half, part of your own body. 'Onye' means a stranger which your wife is not. You must recognize the worth and position of your wife and treat her as your partner and your equal. Unless you do that, she is not a wife to you but a servant, and that is not what God wants a wife to be to the husband."

== Veneration ==
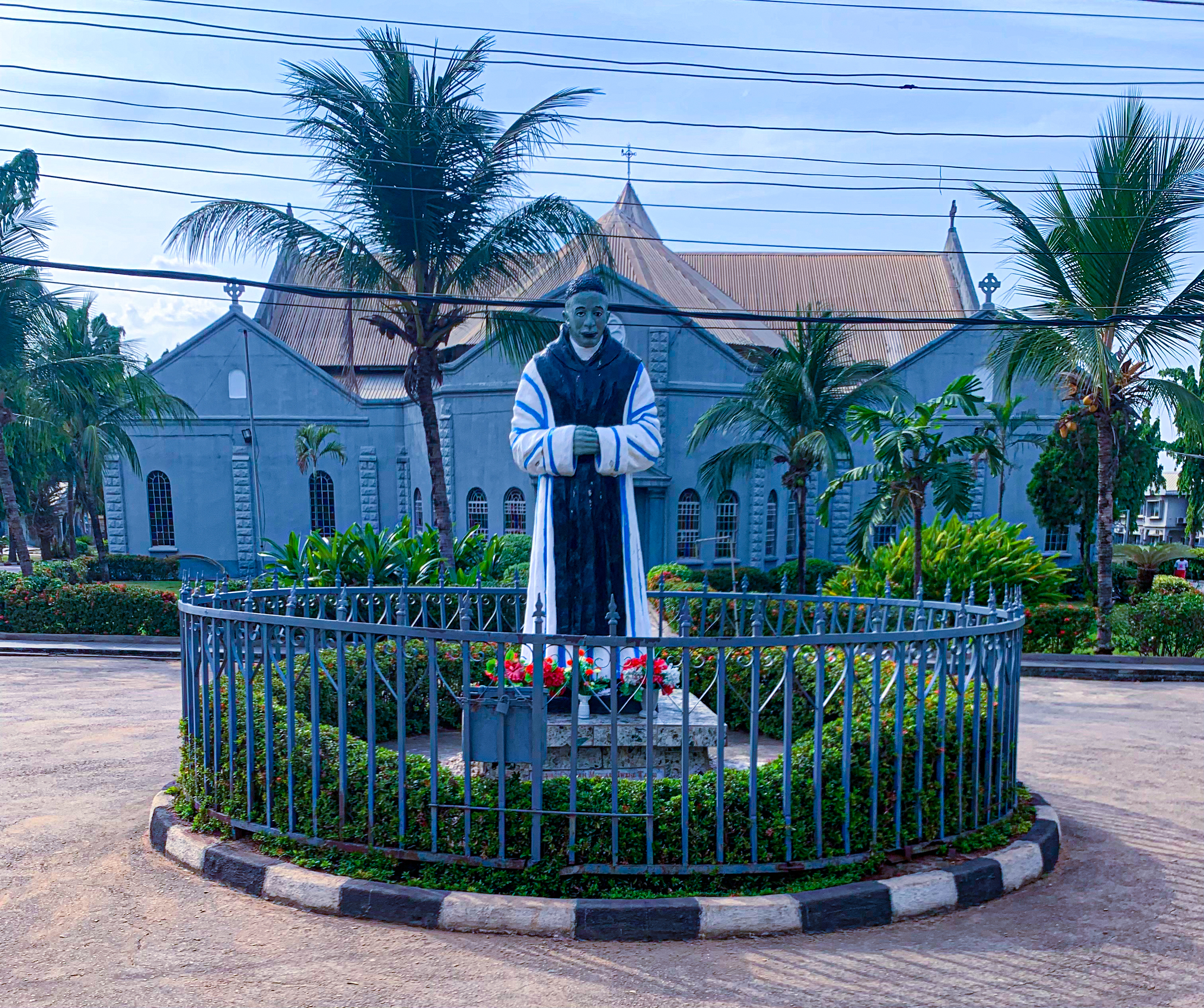
Blessed Tansi at Cathedral Basilica of Most Holy Trinity Onitsha.

Cardinal Francis Arinze stated that he was inspired by Tansi, who was his teacher.

He was beatified by Pope John Paul II on 22 March 1998, at Oba, Nigeria, becoming the first West African to be beatified. Pope John Paul said: "Blessed Cyprian Michael Tansi is a prime example of the fruits of holiness which have grown and matured in the Church in Nigeria since the Gospel was first preached in this land. He received the gift of faith through the efforts of the missionaries, and, taking the Christian way of life as his own, he made it truly African and Nigerian."

There is a statue of Tansi outside Most Holy Trinity Basilica in Onitsha. In 2010, Michael Cyprian Iwene Tansi was named a patron of Nigerian priests. Archbishop Valerian Okeke compared Tansi to St John Mary Vianney as a model of sanctity.

=== Institutions named after Blessed Cyprian Iwene Tansi ===
1. Blessed Iwene Tansi Major Seminary, Onitsha Anambra State Nigeria (Provincial Seminary)
2. Blessed Iwene Tansi Secondary School, Aguleri
3. Blessed Iwene Tansi Parish, Umudioka
4. Blessed Iwene Tansi Parish, Awada-Onitsha
5. Blessed Iwene Tansi Parish, Mba Farm, Onitsha
6. Blessed Iwene Tansi Parish, Ugwu Orji Owerri Imo State
7. Blessed Iwene Tansi Parish, Transekulu, Enugu State
8. Blessed Iwene Tansi Chaplaincy, Nike Grammar School, Enugu State
9. Blessed Iwene Tansi Chaplaincy, Chukwuemeka Odumegwu Ojukwu University (Igbariam Campus)
10. Tansi International College Awka
11. Tansian University, Umunya.
12. Blessed Michael Tansi Catholic Church, Aba
13. Blessed Iwene Tansi Parish, Ijebu-Ode Ogun State
14. Blessed Michael Tansi Parish, Awule, Akure, Ondo State
15. Blessed Tansi Parish, Benin City, Edo State
16. Blessed Tansi Catholic Church, Ugboroke, Uvwie, Delta State
17. Blessed Michael Iwene Tansi Chaplaincy, Ebonyi State University (Ishieke Campus)
