= Michael Tansi Memorial Secondary School, Aguleri =

Michael Tansi Memorial Secondary School is a mission school, owned specifically by Aguleri Diocese of the Roman Catholic Mission, and is situated in Aguleri, Nigeria. The school derives its name from the deceased Blessed Cyprian Michael Iwene Tansi, who hails from Aguleri and doubles as the school's patron saint.

== Academic achievements ==
The school has been ranked as the best school in the region and has featured and excelled in both internal and external competitions. It won the Archbishop Valerian Okeke Science Competition for Aguleri Region with excellent performances in both the Senior and Junior Categories.

== Facilities ==
The school has the following facilities;

- A well–stocked library
- computer laboratory
- Science laboratories
- Classrooms
- School bus
- Sporting equipment and facilities

== Motto ==
The school's motto is Knowledge And Fear Of God.

== Statistics ==
The school has nearly 700 students and admits nearly a hundred students per term.
