= San Giovanni della Pigna, Rome =

San Giovanni della Pigna
- Church of Saint John in Pigna
- Chiesa dei Santi Giovanni Evangelista e Petronio
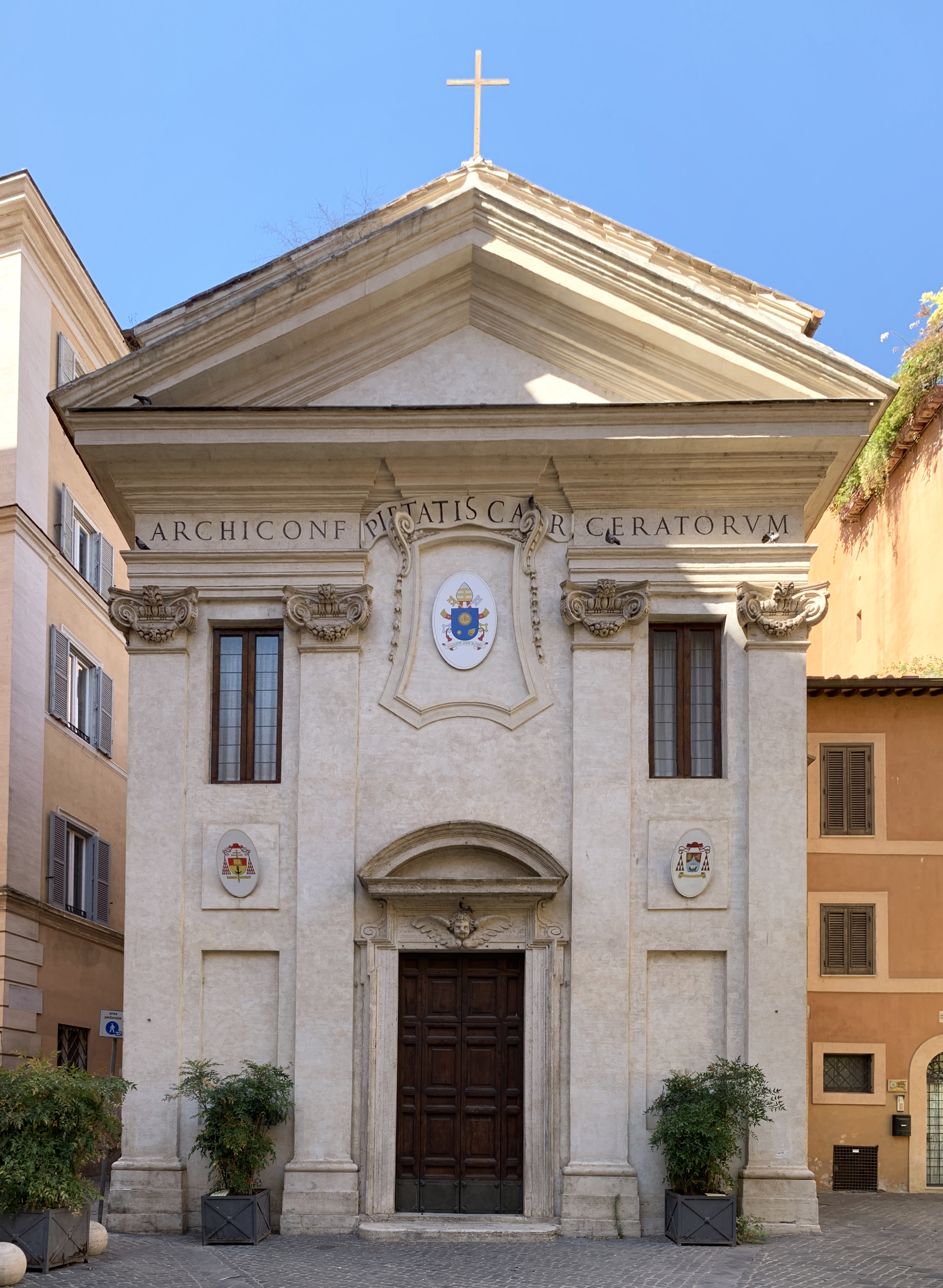
- Façade
- Click on the map for a fullscreen view
- 41°53′50″N 12°28′41″E
- Location: Traversa Vicolo della Minerva, Pigna, Rome
- Country: Italy
- Language: Italian
- Denomination: Catholic
- Tradition: Roman Rite

History
- Status: titular church
- Dedication: John the Baptist
- Dedicated: 1624
- Earlier dedication: Pope Eleutherius and Genesius of Rome

Architecture
- Functional status: titular church
- Architect: Angelo Torroni
- Style: Baroque
- Groundbreaking: 3rd century AD
- Completed: 1624

Administration
- Diocese: Rome

San Giovanni della Pigna is a small Roman Catholic church located on Traversa Vicolo della Minerva in the rione Pigna of Rome, Italy. The church was made a cardinalate deaconry by Pope John Paul II in 1985.

== Description ==
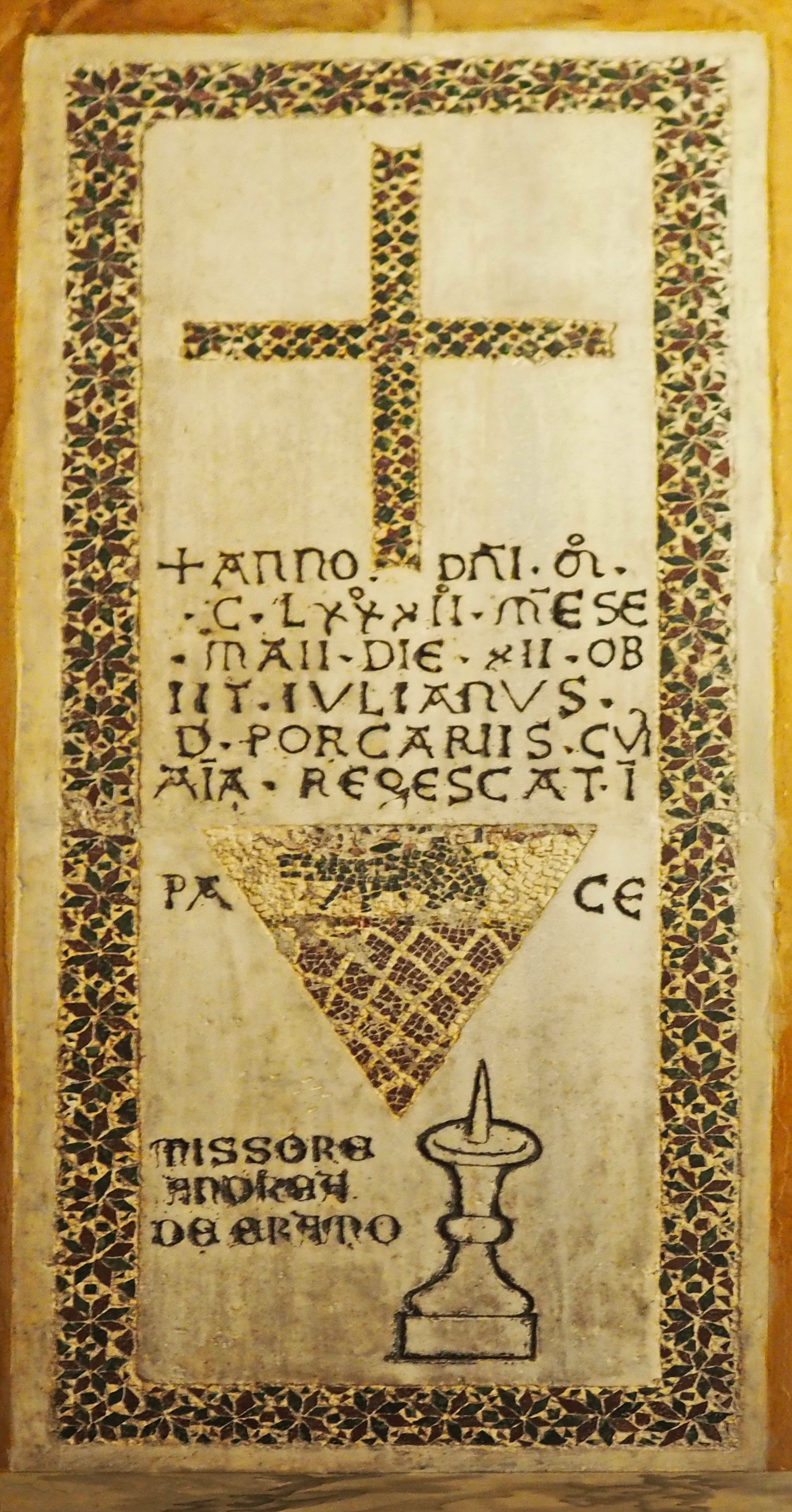
Tombstone of Giuliano Porcari, 1282

Initially a church dedicated to Saints Eleuterio and Ginnasi Martyrs was located here. In ruinous state, it was granted by Pope Gregory XIII to the 'Archconfraternity of the Pietà verso il carcerati, led by the Jesuit Giovanni Talier. The lay organization made outreach to prisoners, including galley prisoners. Pope Sixtus V granted them the right to pardon one prisoner under the death sentence. In 1624, the church was refurbished under the designs of Angelo Torroni. The main altarpiece depicts St John the Baptist by Baldassare Croce; a Pieta by Luigi Garzi; and a Martyrdom of St Eleuterio by Giacomo Zoboli.

== List of Cardinal Deacons ==
- Francis Arinze (1985 - 2005)
- Raffaele Farina, SDB (2007 - )
