= Stephen Ezeanya =

Nigerian Catholic prelate

The Most Reverend Stephen Ezeanya
- Emeritus Archbishop of Onitsha
- Church: Roman Catholic Church
- Archdiocese: Onitsha
- Appointed: 9 May 1985
- Installed: 11 May 1985
- Term ended: 25 February 1995
- Predecessor: Francis Arinze
- Successor: Albert Obiefuna

Orders
- Ordination: 20 December 1953
- Consecration: 11 May 1985 by Francis Arinze

Personal details
- Born: Stephen Nweke Ezeanya; 31 March 1921 Nnokwa, Anambra State, Nigeria
- Died: November 12, 1996 (aged 75) Anambra State, Nigeria
- Buried: Cathedral Basilica of the Most Holy Trinity, Onitsha

Stephen Nweke Ezeanya (31 March 1921—12 November 1996) was a Nigerian Catholic prelate who served as the Archbishop of the Archdiocese of Onitsha from 9 March 1985 until his retirement on 25 February 1995.

== Biography ==
After Francis Arinze was appointed cardinal, Ezeanya was ordained as the bishop of Onitsha. He was installed as the Archbishop of the diocese on 11 May 1985.
