= St. Joseph Major Seminary, Ikot Ekpene =

Catholic seminary in Akwa Ibom State, Nigeria

St. Joseph Major Seminary is a Catholic seminary in Ikot Ekpene, Akwa Ibom State, Nigeria.

== History ==
St. Joseph Major Seminary was founded in 1976 as the philosophical campus of Bigard Memorial Seminary in Enugu, Nigeria. Until 1 March 1991 when it changed to its current name, the seminary was called "Bigard Memorial Seminary, Ikot Ekpene". It ceased to be a philosophical campus in 1987 following the establishment of the department of Sacred Theology as well as the admission of theology students for the 1989 and 1990 academic session. The seminary has two departments: philosophy and theology, with each requiring a four year studies as well as trainings of students to the Catholic priesthood.

== Notable people ==
- Thomas Ifeanyichukwu Obiatuegwu, auxiliary bishop of the Diocese of Orlu
