= Apostolate for Family Consecration =

U.S. Roman Catholic lay movement

The Apostolate for Family Consecration is an American Catholic lay movement headquartered in Bloomingdale, Ohio, founded in 1975 by Jerry and Gwen Coniker, the latter of whom is now a candidate for sainthood.

== History ==
In 1971, Jerry Coniker (1938–2018) sold his business and with his wife Gwen (1939–2002) and their eight children moved to Fátima, Portugal, for what he called "a two-year retreat." Coniker had founded Coniker Systems, which manufactured communications, time management, and sales control systems for Fortune 500 companies. An anti-abortion activist concerned for the family, Coniker decided he "couldn't succeed politically without bringing people back to God."

Upon their return to the U.S., Coniker became the executive director of a Franciscan ministry, the Militia Immaculata, in Wisconsin.

In 1975, the Conikers founded the Apostolate for Family Consecration, which received official approval from the Catholic Church later that year. Among other works, they began producing television shows for EWTN.

In 1990, the ministry borrowed US$1 million to buy an abandoned seminary property from the Diocese of Steubenville, and began to restore the buildings, many of which had not been used in two decades, and expand the property. It paid off the debt in 1996.

In 1999, the Conikers were named by Pope John Paul II as one of twenty couples who advised the Pontifical Council for the Family. In 2004, the pope named Coniker a consultor for the Council. In 2007, in a "Decree of Recognition and Approval" issued by Pope Benedict XVI through the Pontifical Council for the Laity, the Apostolate was declared "a private international association of the faithful of pontifical right, with a juridical personality, according to canons 298-311 and 321-329 of the Code of Canon Law.". Referring to one of the Apostolate's slogans in his statement at the occasion, Bishop Josef Clemens said that "‘Families evangelizing families’ is not only a beautiful Christian ideal, it is an urgent need in society today, so that the human and Christian values of the family might be promoted in their fullness."

Gwen Coniker died of cancer in 2002, and in June 2007 the Bishop of Steubenville let the cause for her canonization proceed. The initial investigation, into whether she showed "heroic virtue," began that September. Part of the evidence presented was her refusing to abort her eleventh child, Theresa, when her doctor said the pregnancy would burst her uterus and kill her. The baby was delivered safely, and she had two more children.

== Organization ==
Today, the Apostolate operates Catholic Familyland, a 950-acre (3.8 km^{2}) Catholic resort and retreat center in eastern Ohio. It offers several catechetical and educational programs for families and parishes. It has also published a two-volume Apostolate's Family Catechism, which was approved by the American Catholic bishops.

Headquartered at Catholic Familyland in central Ohio (established 1990), the Apostolate has had international influence in the Archdiocese of Manila (starting in 1994); México (starting in 1999); Belgium (starting in 2000); Myanmar; Russia; Nigeria (starting in 2004); and Portugal. At one time it also ran the Familyland Television Network, whose studios are located at Catholic Familyland. Much of that content can be found on its YouTube channel.

Among the Apostolate's supporters are Cardinal Francis Arinze, former President of the Pontifical Council for Interreligious Dialogue (1984–2002) and then the prefect of the Congregation of Divine Worship (2002–2008), when he retired.; Saint Mother Teresa of Calcutta, who joined the advisory council in 1976 (the Conikers were invited by Fox News to offer commentary during her funeral); Cardinal Alfonso López Trujillo, president of the Pontifical Council for the Family (1990–2008); and then-Cardinal Joseph Ratzinger. Cardinal Mario Luigi Ciappi, O.P., who had served as the papal theologian for five popes, including John Paul II, became the Apostolate's theological director.

== See also ==
- Catholic spirituality
- Universal call to holiness
