= Bigard Memorial Seminary =

Catholic seminary in Enugu, Nigeria

- Motto: Eritis mihi testis
- Motto in English: You shall be witnesses
- Type: University
- Established: 1924; 102 years ago
- Religious affiliation: Roman Catholic
- Rector: Rev. Fr. Albert Ikpenwa
- Students: 780 seminarians (2023)
- Location: Enugu, Enugu State, Nigeria
- Campus: Suburban
- Website: www.bigardenugu.org

Bigard Memorial Seminary is a Catholic seminary in Enugu, Nigeria.

== History ==
Bigard Memorial Seminary was formerly known as St. Paul's Seminary, Onitsha. Founded in 1922 and officially opened in 1924 by Bishop Joseph Shanahan, the seminary has undergone several relocations including from Onitsha to Igbariam. it was later moved to Eke and Okpala before settling at a permanent site in Enugu. In 1951, the seminary was renamed 'Bigard Memorial Seminary' in honour of Stephanie and Jeanne Bigard, the French mother-daughter foundresses of the Opus Sancti Petri Apostoli society, which helped to fund the seminary's building under Bishop Charles Heerey. The permanent site at Enugu was officially opened on 4 March 1951 by Archbishop David Matthews.

Throughout its history, the seminary has received notable visitors, including Pope John Paul II, who visited in 1982, making it the first Nigerian seminary to host a Pope. The seminary celebrated its 75th anniversary in 1999 and its centenary in 2024. The seminary opened philosophy campuses at Ikot Ekpene in 1976 and Owerri in 1989. These campuses later became independent seminaries: St. Joseph Major Seminary, Ikot Ekpene, and Seat of Wisdom Major Seminary, Owerri.
