= Aguleri =

Aguleri Aguleri Ike Okpa, Ike Ego Agulụ Enyi Mba
- City
- Aguleri
- Nickname: Aguleri bụ Enyi
- Interactive map of Aguleri
- Country: Nigeria
- State: Anambra State
- LGA: Anambra East
- National language: Igbo

Government
  - Type: Traditional
  - Igwe: HRM Igwe (Dr.) Michael Chukwuneme Idigo V, (Ezeudo I)

Population (2006)
  - Total: 1,500,000
  - Ethnicity: Igbo others
  - Religion: Odinani 60% No Religion 20.5% and Christianity 19.5%
- Demonyms: Onye Aguleri (singular); Ndi Aguleri (plural) (Igbo)

Aguleri is a medium-sized town situated in the Anambra Valley in southeastern Nigeria, a country on the west coast of Africa. It is the largest town in the Anambra East local government area of Anambra State. It is the town of the newly established Roman Catholic Diocese of Aguleri.

Aguleri is bordered by Umueri, Anam, and Nando to the west; Anaku, Omor, Ifite Ogwari, Igbakwu, and Umueje to the east; Iggah, Ojjor, Asaba, and Ogwurugwu communities of Uzo Uwani LGA in Enugu State to the south; and Obele, Odeke, and Eshonwa communities of Ibaji LGA in Kogi State to the north. Census figures estimate the population of Aguleri to be close to 3 Million people. The town covers an area of approximately 480 square kilometers.

The ruling family of Aguleri is the Idigo family, whose dynasty has lasted for over ten decades. The current king is HRM Michael Chukwuneme Idigo V, (Ezeudo I).

== History ==
According to oral tradition, the origin of Aguleri is traced to a man named Eri 4500 BC. Eri is said to have settled at the bank of the river, where he established an altar of onyx at the confluence of the Ezu and Omabala rivers. Due to annual flooding, Eri relocated inland to Eri-aka near the Odanduli stream, and eventually to the site where he established Obu Uga (Obu-Gad).

Eri had several children: Agulu (Aguleri), Attah, Oba, Menri, and Adamgbo (Iguedo, his only daughter). All of Eri's children lived together with him in Aguleri until his death, after which they dispersed to found different kingdoms. Attah, the second son, left to establish the Igala kingdom, while Oba moved on to found the Benin kingdom. Menri later departed Aguleri to establish the Nri kingdom. Eri's eldest son, Agulu-eri (Aguleri), remained behind and inherited his father's land, expanding the kingdom. Aguleri had three wives: Ada, Omali, and Eke, and fathered four sons: Ivite, Igboezunu, Enugwu, and Eziagulu.

Ada, the first wife, did not conceive initially. Agulu (Aguleri) subsequently married Omali, his second wife, who bore him a son named Ivite (first son). Later, Ada gave birth to a son named Igboezunu (second son). Agulu (Aguleri) then married his third wife, Eke, with whom he had two sons: Enugwu (third son) and Eziagulu (fourth son). These three wives of Aguleri formed Akwukwonato.

== Villages ==
Aguleri is currently divided into three main quarters: Igboezunu, Ivite, and Enugwu na Eziagulu (Ugwu na Adegbe), with component families present in both Aguleri Uno and Aguleri Otu.

In Igbo culture, property inheritance follows the birth order, with the first child having the first choice of property. Therefore, the villages in Aguleri include: Homeland (Enuobodo), Igboezunu-otu, Ivite-otu, Eziagulu-otu, Enugu-otu, generally known as Aguleri-otu, which is situated in the lower part of the Omambala River.

New settlements known as Ugwu Ndi-Uka (Mbito) belong to Egbeagu village in Eziagulu Aguleri, where early Roman Catholic missionaries initially settled before spreading the gospel to the hinterland. Today, Amaeze (Otuocha) serves as the urban area of Aguleri.

The soil in Aguleri is highly fertile, supporting the cultivation of various food crops for both commercial purposes and subsistence farming. Aguleri is recognized as a significant agricultural hub and Blessed land within Anambra State.

== Culture and festivals ==
Aguleri, as a historically significant city, hosts numerous cultural events and features several cultural monuments, including Agbanabo Ezu na Omabala, Ajana Ukwu, Ugwu Ogodo, Ovilivo, Otutu Nzu, Aro Oleme Nklisi, Ngene Ovile sacred spring Deities, and many other historical sites spread across the ancient city of Aguleri. The city celebrates various festivals, prominently including the Alo Mmuo (New Yam Festival, also known as Ivejioku festival) and Igba Ada festival, which involve participation from all parts of the town and feature performances by various masquerades. The Ovalla festival is particularly revered, drawing a range of activities and celebrations that are highly esteemed by Aguleri residents. Olili Obibia Eri is another significant festival held in the seventh native month to honor Eri, considered the father of Aguleri and the Igbo race. Additional festivals include Uta Oba, celebrated exclusively by titled men, as well as the Akwali festival, Oluta Festival, and Nzideana festival marking the end of the seasonal flood and the beginning of the new farming season.

In the average home of an Aguleri citizen, it is customary to keep kola nuts, garden eggs, and peanut butter on hand in case of visits from strangers or guests. The offering of kola nuts to visitors marks the beginning of any visitation, symbolizing a warm welcome. This ritual is rooted in prayers and blessings offered to the supreme God (Chukwu) and other deities for the protection of both the visitor and the host. It is a customary practice observed during traditional ceremonies among the people of Aguleri.

The Ovala festival is a royal celebration held on the first Eke market day of the year. It attracts dignitaries from various backgrounds, and neighboring village leaders also visit to pay respects to the Igwe (traditional ruler) of Aguleri on this occasion.

== Infrastructure ==
The community is responsible for the construction and maintenance of the majority of public infrastructure in Aguleri. This includes facilities such as Ivite Aguleri Primary Health Care, Aguleri Town Hall, St. Joseph Memorial High School Aguleri, Justice Chinwuba Memorial Secondary School Aguleri, Willie Obiano Secondary School Enugwu Aguleri, Col. Mike Attah Secondary School Aguleri, Postal Agency, Aguleri Community Bank, Nkwo Igboezunu Market, Eke UgwunaAdagbe Market, Access Bank, Odene Aguleri Head Bridge, Aguleri High Court and Judges quarters, 54 Squadron Mobile Police Force Aguleri barracks, Aguleri Civic Center, Aguleri Regional Water Scheme, Orient Staff Residential Quarters, and other similar facilities are community-owned and maintained.

Michael Tansi Memorial Secondary School, Aguleri, is administered by the Onitsha Archdiocese of the Roman Catholic Mission.

== Notable people ==
Notable people from Aguleri include:

- Willie Obiano, former Governor of Anambra State
- Cyprian Michael Iwene Tansi, Nigerian priest of the Catholic Church who worked in the Archdiocese of Onitsha and later became a Trappist monk at Mount Saint Bernard Monastery in England
- Benjamin Chinedu Obidigwe, former member of the House of Representatives of Nigeria

== Climate ==
Aguleri has a tropical climate which is known by a hot, rainy season and a hot, dry season. The climate is hot and humid for most of the year, with average temperature.
