= Justice Development and Peace Caritas Onitsha =

Justice Development and Peace Caritas (JDPC) Onitsha
- Formation: 1990
- Type: Non-governmental organization (NGO)
- Legal status: Active
- Headquarters: Basilica of the Most Holy Trinity, Onitsha, Anambra State, Nigeria
- Coordinates: 6.1431°N 6.7922°E
- Region served: Anambra State, Nigeria
- Methods: Advocacy, legal aid, community development, micro-credit support
- Website: jdpconitsha.org

Justice Development and Peace Commission Onitsha established 1990 is a non-profit organization under the Catholic Archdiocese of Onitsha. It is focused on community engagement, human development and social justice. It is commonly called JDPC. It is a faith-based organization that is under the Department of Church and Society. There is a JDPC in most of the Catholic Archdiocese in Nigeria. It is a social and charity arm of the Catholic church through which it reaches out to numerous people in need in order to improve their standard of living.

According to Caritas Evidence, the organization is dedicated to addressing issues of poverty, inequality, and social injustice, while fostering peace and development in communities across Nigeria.

== Activities ==
JDPC Onitsha had a review meeting in Awka on peace, security, peaceful election and service delivery project in Anambra State. This was in preparation for the then coming election to create enabling environment for the voters. The need for good leadership and representation has been called by JDPC Onitsha to enhance in governance in Nigeria.

=== Cancer engagement ===
JDPC Onitsha collaborated with Development Initiative for Technology and Empowerment (DITEm) and Pink Health Foundation on the commemoration of 2022 World Cancer Day in Onitsha Anambra State. The theme for 2020 World Cancer Day "Close the Care Gap," was marked with free cancer screening to 53 women. The event took place at St. Jude Parish, Fegge, Onitsha, Anambra State.

=== Collaboration ===
JDPC Onitsha has collaborated with Development Initiative for Technology and Empowerment (DITEm) and Pink Health Foundation on Cancer engagement activities. It also collaborated with Development in Practice (DiP), Justice Development and Peace Commission (JDPC) Awka, JDC Nnewi, African Center for Leadership and Strategic Development and Civil Rights Concern (CRC) on Voice to the People Project. JDPC Onitsha also partnered with Christian Aid Nigeria.

== Flooding ==
The JDPC was meant to carry out renovation project in twelve primary schools and health centers in Ogbaru local government area in Anambra State that were damaged during the flood. Also noted was that JDPC Onitsha built the capacities of 12 people in Ogbaru to enable them support the project under the Disaster Risk Reduction, (DRR) approach for response on the flooding areas. This project was given to them by the Catholic Relief Services. The project was titled “Flood Disaster Risk Reduction and Management. According to the Project Lead of the organization, “for the health services, our focus is primary health centers which provide health care services to the local communities. We are retrofitting one health center in each of the 12 communities. In all, we are going to renovate 12 health centers. Also, in each of these communities, we are renovating 12 schools.” The JDPC Dunukofia region also had a campaign on environmental safety where they had a walk with the placards written ” Don’t litter the environment with paper, canny, bottles and sachets, Stop dumping refuse, put your refuse in a waste bag amongst other as well as chanting, Governor Soludo help us, people are dying here!”

=== Projects ===
- Flood Disaster Risk Reduction and Management Project, funded by Catholic Relief Services. This project focused on the renovation of primary schools and health centres in Ogbaru local government area of Anambra state.
- Peace, Security, Peaceful Election and Service Delivery Project.
- Voice to the People Project (V2P): A governance project for the poor and the marginalized which was supported by Christian Aid Nigeria. The project was carried out in 48 communities in Anambra state with support from Christian Aid (CA) and was funded by UK Aid The V2P had a gender perspective that ensured gender equality and women empowerment. It was carried out in Anambra State also led by Christian Aid Nigeria.
- Governance and Transparency Fund: Power to the People Project. A project that focused on making governance work for the poor and the marginalized people in Nigeria

== Executive Directors of JDPC Onitsha ==
- Rev. Fr. Dr. Martin Onukwuba.
- Rev. Fr. Dr. Edwin Udoye.

=== Publications ===
- Anambra state budget on watch: 2014 budget performance monitoring.
- Understanding Advocacy for Effective Performance in Governance. ISBN 978-978-927-062-0
- The JDPC Magazine: A quarterly production of Justice Development and Peace Commission, Archdiocese of Onitsha
