= Archdiocese of Onitsha =

Latin Catholic jurisdiction in Anambra State, Nigeria

Archdiocese of Onitsha Archidiœcesis Onitshanus
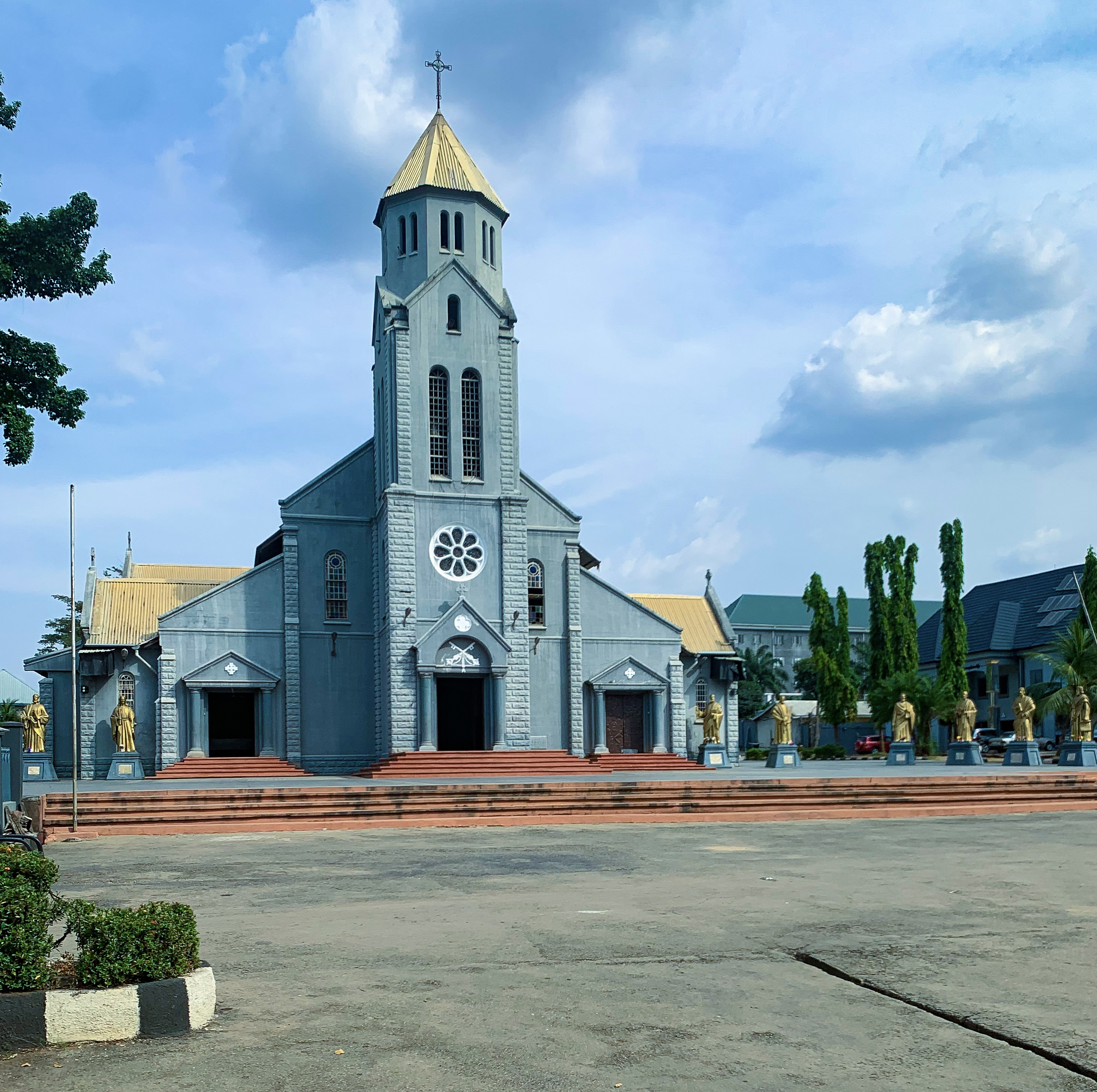
- Holy Trinity Basilica

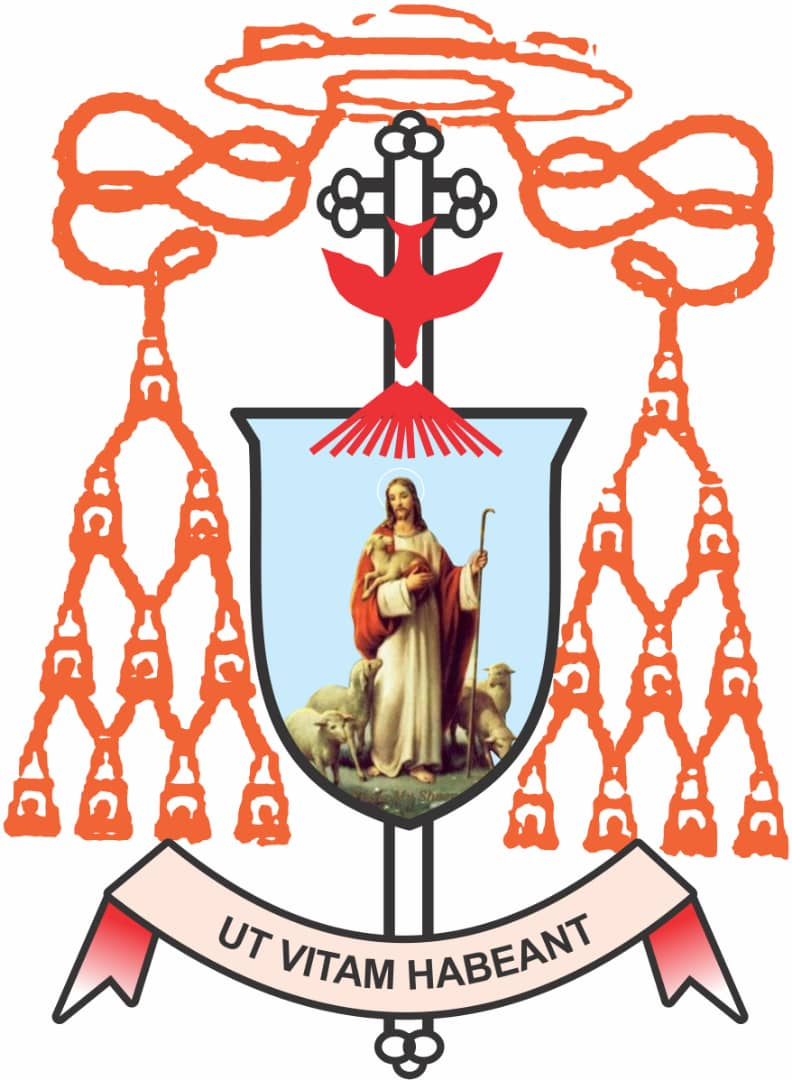
- Coat of arms

Location
- Country: Nigeria
- Ecclesiastical province: Onitsha
- Coordinates: 6°9′59.9472″N 6°46′59.9226″E

Statistics
- Area: 1,390 km^{2} (540 sq mi)
- Population: Total; Catholics: (as of 2023); 2,203,820; 1,857,060 (84.3%)
- Parishes: 126

Information
- Denomination: Catholic Church
- Sui iuris church: Latin Church
- Rite: Roman Rite
- Established: July 27, 1889; 137 years ago, as Apostolic Prefecture of the Lower Niger; April 16, 1920; 106 years ago, as Apostolic Vicariate of the Southern Nigeria; April 18, 1950; 76 years ago, as Archdiocese of Onitsha
- Cathedral: Cathedral Basilica of the Most Holy Trinity, Onitsha
- Patron saint: Cyprian Michael Iwene Tansi
- Secular priests: 428

Current leadership
- Pope: Leo XIV
- Archbishop: Valerian Okeke
- Suffragans: Abakaliki, Aguleri, Awgu, Awka, Enugu, Ekwulobia, Nnewi, Nsukka
- Vicar General: Johnbosco Okafor
- Episcopal Vicars: Victor Mbanisi; Martin Ikeagu; Aloysius Ikekwe; Victor Ezeanya

Map
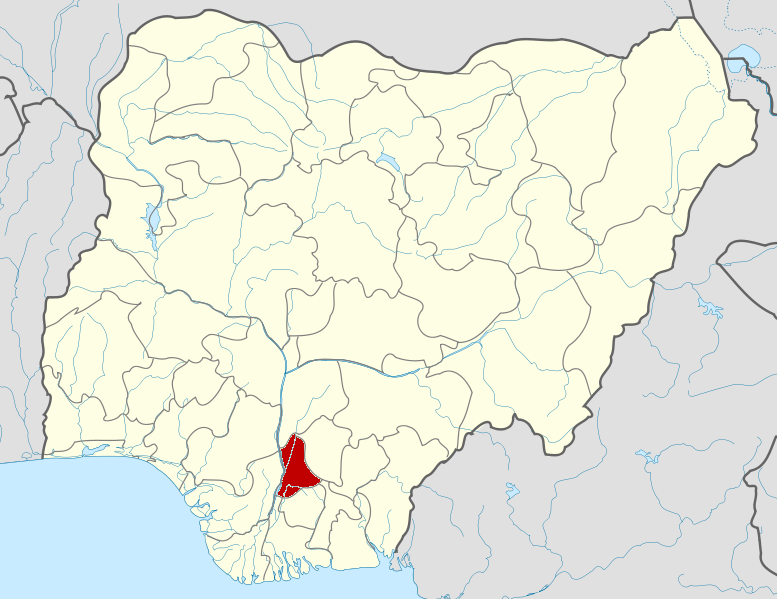
- Anambra's location in the Nigeria map

Website
- www.onitsha-archdiocese.org

The Archdiocese of Onitsha (Latin: Archidiœcesis Onitshanus) is a Latin Church archdiocese of the Catholic Church located in Anambra State, Nigeria. It encompasses the towns of Onitsha, Ogidi, Nkpor, Nnobi, Ojoto, Oba, Nkwelle Ezunaka, Umuoji, Umudioka and Abatete.

The Archdiocese of Onitsha is the largest diocese in Nigeria by population, encompassing 196 parishes that serve around 1.3 million Catholics, in addition to hundreds of Catholic schools, hospitals and charities. The archdiocese also operates All Hallows Seminary in Onitsha. The archbishop is also the metropolitan of the larger Ecclesiastical Province of Onitsha.

Trinitas Newspaper is the digital news outlet of the archdiocese and includes a website, social media channels, and a weekly e-newsletter.

Bishop Joseph Shanahan was appointed the first Apostolic Prefect of what was then the Apostolic Prefecture of the Lower Niger in 1889 and the Apostolic Vicar of the Apostolic Vicariate of Southern Nigeria in 1920. Francis Cardinal Arinze became the first indigenous archbishop of the diocese. On 28 November 2001, Valerian Okeke was appointed Coadjutor archbishop of Onitsha by Pope John Paul II. He was consecrated the archbishop of the diocese on 9 February 2002 by Archbishop Osvaldo Padilla.

== Prelature ==
The ordinary of the Archdiocese of Onitsha is an archbishop whose cathedral is the Cathedral Basilica of the Most Holy Trinity in Onitsha. The archdiocese is the metropolitan see of the ecclesiastical province of Onitsha, which includes the following suffragan dioceses:

- Abakaliki
- Aguleri
- Awgu
- Awka
- Ekwulobia
- Enugu
- Nnewi
- Nsukka

The ecclesiastical province includes all of Anambra State, Enugu State, and Ebonyi State. As such, the metropolitan archbishop possesses certain limited authority over the suffragan sees of the province (see Ecclesiastical Province § Catholic Church).

== History ==
The Catholic Mission was established in Nigeria on 5 December 1885 with the advent of the missionaries of the Holy Ghost Fathers when they came to Onitsha. They include the religious mainly from France, Ireland and Alsace–Lorraine. On 25 July 1889, Onitsha was erected as an Apostolic Prefecture of the Lower Niger. It was formed from the larger Apostolic Vicariate of Benin Coast.

On 16 April 1920, the Prefecture was promoted as the Apostolic Vicariate of Southern Nigeria. On 9 July 1934, the Vicariate was renamed from Southern Nigeria to Apostolic Vicariate of Onitsha-Owerri and later on 12 February 1948, as the Vicariate of Onitsha.

On 18 April 1950, the Vicariate was promoted to an archdiocese together with the archdioceses of Lagos and Kaduna. Its cathedral was granted a minor basilica in 2007.

== Leadership ==
Prefects Apostolic of Lower Niger {Niger Inferiore}

- Father Léon-Alexander Lejeune, C.S.Sp. 23 May 1900 – 5 September 1905
- Father Joseph Shanahan, C.S.Sp. 20 September 1905 - 16 April 1920 see below

Vicars Apostolic of Southern Nigeria {Nigeria Meridionale}

- Bishop Joseph Shanahan, C.S.Sp. see above 16 April 1920 - 21 May 1931
- Bishop Charles Heerey, C.S.Sp. 21 May 1931 – 9 July 1934 see below

Vicar Apostolic of Onitsha-Owerri

- Bishop Charles Heerey, C.S.Sp. see above 9 July 1934 – 12 February 1948 see below

Vicar Apostolic of Onitsha

- Bishop Charles Heerey, C.S.Sp. see above 12 February 1948 – 18 April 1950 see below

Archbishops of Onitsha

- Archbishop Charles Heerey, C.S.Sp. see above 18 April 1950 – 26 June 1967
- Archbishop Francis Arinze 1967.06.26 – 1985.03.09, already appointed Pro-Prefect of the Secretariat of Non-Christians in 1984; elevated to Cardinal in 1985
- Archbishop Stephen Ezeanya 1985.03.09 – 1995.02.25
- Archbishop Albert Obiefuna 1995.02.25 – 2003.09.01
- Archbishop Valerian Okeke since 2003.09.01

=== Coadjutor Bishops ===
- Francis Arinze (1965–1967), did not have right of succession (?) but was appointed Archbishop here; future Cardinal
- Charles Heerey, C.S.Sp. (1927–1931), as Coadjutor Vicar Apostolic
- Albert Obiefuna (1994–1995), as Coadjutor Archbishop
- Valerian Okeke (2001–2003), as Coadjutor Archbishop

=== Auxiliary Bishops ===
- John Anyogu (1957–1962), appointed Bishop of Enugu
- Denis Chidi Isizoh (2015- 2023) appointed Bishop of Aguleri
- Emmanuel Otteh (1990–1996), appointed Bishop of Issele-Uku

== Other archdiocesan priests who became bishops ==
- Albert Obiefuna, appointed Bishop of Awka in 1977; later returned here as Coadjutor
- Hilary Paul Odili Okeke, appointed Bishop of Nnewi in 2001
- Jude Thaddeus Okolo (priest here 1983–2001), appointed nuncio and titular archbishop in 2008
- Mark Onwuha Unegbu (priest here, 1944–1948), appointed Bishop of Owerri in 1970

== Parishes ==
- Holy Trinity Cathedral Basilica (Onitsha)

== Schools ==
- Queen of the Rosary College, Onitsha.
- Regina Pacis Secondary School, Onitsha
- Mater Amabilis Secondary School, Umuoji
- St. Kizito Secondary School, Umudioka.
- St. Charles College, Onitsha
- Christ the King College, Onitsha
- Michael Tansi Memorial Secondary School, Aguleri
- All Hallows Seminary
- Blessed Iwene Tansi Seminary, Onitsha
- St. Augustine of Hippo Group of Schools, Nkpor.

== Catholic charitable organizations ==
- Justice Development and Peace Caritas Onitsha.

== Religious figures associated with archdiocese ==
Blesseds

- Cyprian Michael Iwene Tansi

== See also ==
- Catholic Church in Nigeria
- Justice Development and Peace Caritas Onitsha, the diocese's charity arm
