= Peter Iornzuul Adoboh =

Nigerian Catholic priest (1958–2020)

Peter Iornzuul Adoboh (14 April 1958 – 14 February 2020) was a Nigerian Roman Catholic bishop.

Iornzuul Adoboh was born in Nigeria and was ordained to the priesthood in 1984. He served as the first bishop of the Roman Catholic Diocese of Katsina-Ala, Nigeria, from 2013 until his death in 2020.
