= Diocese of Katsina =

Roman Catholic diocese in Nigeria

Diocese of Katsina Dioecesis Katsinensis

Location
- Country: Nigeria
- Territory: Katsina
- Ecclesiastical province: Kaduna
- Metropolitan: Kaduna
- Coordinates: 12°43′03″N 7°59′06″E

Statistics
- Area: 29,000 km^{2} (11,000 sq mi)
- Population: Total; Catholics: (as of 2023); 9,669,439; 19,000 (0.2%)
- Parishes: 20

Information
- Denomination: Roman Catholic
- Rite: Latin Rite
- Established: 16 October 2023
- Cathedral: St. Martin De Porres Cathedral, Katsina
- Secular priests: 15

Current leadership
- Pope: Leo XIV
- Bishop: Rev. Gerald Mamman Musa

Map
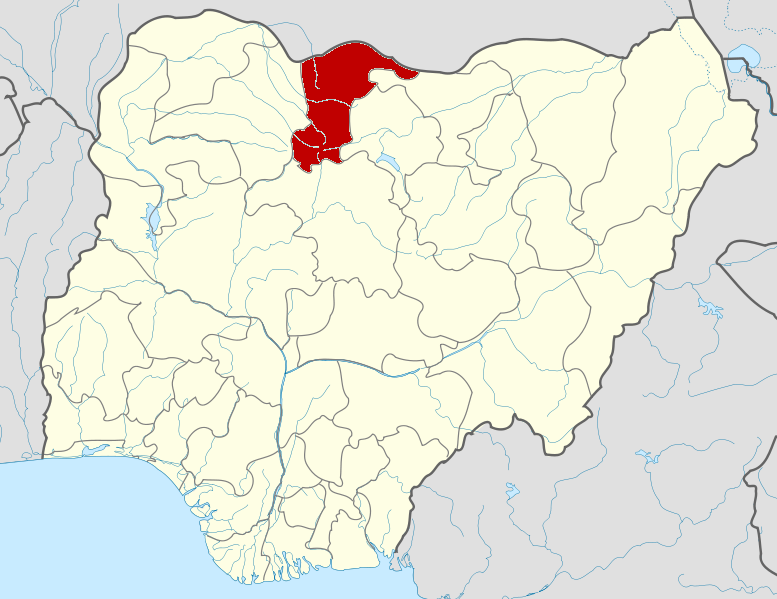
- The Diocese of Katsina includes all of Katsina State.

The Roman Catholic Diocese of Katsina (Latin: Katsinen(sis)) is a diocese located in the city of Katsina in the ecclesiastical province of Kaduna in Nigeria. Its territory is made up of the state of Katsina. It was established by Pope Francis in 2023.

== History ==
- October 16, 2023: Established as the Diocese of Katsina from the Roman Catholic Diocese of Sokoto.

== Special churches ==
The Cathedral is St. Martin De Porres Cathedral in Katsina city.

== Bishops ==
- Diocese of Katsina (Roman rite)
  - Bishop Gerald Mamman Musa (2023.10.16 - present)

== Sources ==
- GCatholic.org Information
- Catholic Hierarchy
- Nigerian Catholic Diocesan Priests Association page about Katsina Diocese
