= All Hallows Seminary =

Catholic seminary in Anambra State, Nigeria

Coordinates: 6°8′44.70″N 6°48′54.66″E

All Hallows Seminary is a Catholic private seminary in Onitsha, Anambra State, Nigeria.

== History ==
The seminary was founded in 1924 by Bishop Joseph Shanahan. The first rector was Rev. Fr. William O'Donnel as the first Rector. The seminary moved to several places before settling in its permanent site in Onitsha in February 1952 when it moved down to the present site in Onitsha.

== Notable people ==
- Amechi Akwanya
- Francis Arinze

== Sources ==
- Udoye, Edwin Anaegboka (2011). Resolving the Prevailing Conflicts Between Christianity and African (Igbo) Traditional Religion Through Inculturation. LIT Verlag Münster. ISBN 978-3-643-90116-3.
- Njoku, Akuma-Kalu; Uzukwu, Elochukwu (2014-10-21). Interface Between Igbo Theology and Christianity. Cambridge Scholars Publishing. ISBN 978-1-4438-7034-4.
- Nwosu, Vincent A. (1985). The Catholic Church in Onitsha: People, Places, and Events, 1885-1985. Etukokwu Press.
