= Albert Obiefuna =

Nigerian archbishop (1930–2011)

- Archbishop of Onitsha
- Church: Catholic Church
- Archdiocese: Archdiocese of Onitsha
- In office: 25 February 1995 – 1 September 2003
- Predecessor: Stephen Ezeanya
- Successor: Valerian Okeke
- Previous posts: Coadjutor Archbishop of Onitsha (1994-1995); Bishop of Awka (1977-1994)

Orders
- Ordination: 21 December 1963 by Gregorio Pietro Agagianian
- Consecration: 5 February 1978 by Girolamo Prigione

Personal details
- Born: Albert Kanene Obiefuna; 30 January 1930 Oraukwu, Southern Nigeria, Colony and Protectorate of Nigeria, British Empire
- Died: 11 May 2011 (aged 81)

Albert Kanene Obiefuna (30 January 1930 – 11 May 2011) was a Roman Catholic archbishop of the Roman Catholic Archdiocese of Onitsha, Nigeria.

Ordained to the priesthood in 1963, Obiefuna became Bishop of Awka in 1977, Archbishop of Onitsha in 1995 and retired in 2003.
