= Diocese of Ekwulobia =

Roman Catholic diocese in Nigeria

Diocese of Ekwulobia Dioecesis Ekvulobianus
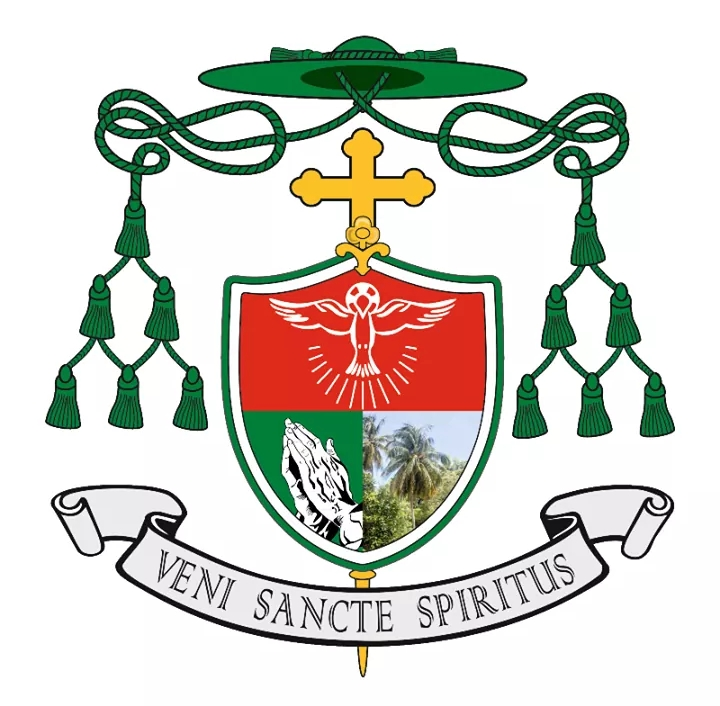
- Coat of arms

Location
- Country: Nigeria
- Territory: Anambra State
- Ecclesiastical province: Onitsha
- Metropolitan: Onitsha

Statistics
- Area: 676 km^{2} (261 sq mi)
- Population: Total; Catholics: (as of 2022); 994,308; 609,818 (61.3%)
- Parishes: 87

Information
- Denomination: Catholic Church
- Sui iuris church: Latin Church
- Rite: Roman Rite
- Established: 5 March 2020
- Cathedral: St. Joseph Cathedral
- Secular priests: 514

Current leadership
- Pope: Leo XIV
- Bishop: Peter Ebere Okpaleke

The Diocese of Ekwulobia is a Latin Church ecclesiastical jurisdiction or diocese of the Catholic Church located in Anambra State, Nigeria. It is a suffragan diocese in the ecclesiastical province of the metropolitan Onitsha.

The first Bishop of Ekwulobia, Peter Ebere Cardinal Okpaleke, was installed on 29 April 2020.

== History ==
- 5 March 2020: Established as Diocese of Ekwulobia from the Diocese of Awka.
- The cathedral is St. Joseph's Catholic Church.

== Leadership ==
- Peter Ebere Cardinal Okpaleke (29 April 2020 – present)

== See also ==
- Roman Catholicism in Nigeria

== External link ==
GCatholic website
