= Diocese of Katsina-Ala =

Roman Catholic diocese in Nigeria

Diocese of Katsina-Ala Dioecesis Katsinensis-Alensis

Location
- Country: Nigeria
- Territory: Sankera geopolitical zone, Benue State
- Ecclesiastical province: Abuja
- Metropolitan: Abuja
- Headquarters: Katsina-Ala
- Coordinates: 7°10′0″N 9°17′0″E

Statistics
- Area: 6,465 km^{2} (2,496 sq mi)
- Population: Total; Catholics: (as of 2022); 301,350; 217,300 (72.1%)
- Parishes: 40

Information
- Denomination: Roman Catholic
- Rite: Latin Rite
- Established: 29 December 2012
- Cathedral: Cathedral of St. Gerard Majella, in Katsina-Ala
- Patron saint: Saint Gerard Majella
- Secular priests: 36
- Language: Tiv, English

Current leadership
- Pope: Leo XIV
- Bishop: Isaac Bundepuun Dugu
- Metropolitan Archbishop: Ignatius Kaigama
- Vicar General: Fr Godwin Bagu

Map
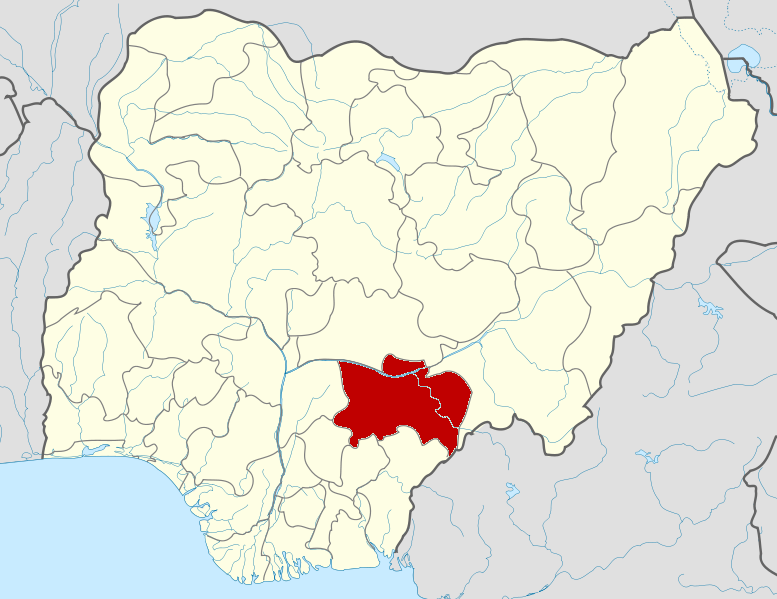
- Katsina-Ala is located in Benue State which is shown in red.

The Roman Catholic Diocese of Katsina-Ala (Latin: Katsinen(sis)- Alen(sis) is a diocese located in the city of Katsina-Ala in the ecclesiastical province of Abuja in Nigeria.

Its cathedral is the church of St. Gerald of Majella in Katsina-Ala.

== Territory ==
The Diocese is located in a portion of Benue State and includes the districts of Katsina-Ala, Logo, and Ukum and portions of Guma, Taraba and Buruku.

== Leadership ==
- Peter Iornzuul Adoboh (29 December 2012 – 14 February 2020)
- Isaac Bunde Dugu (9 April 2022 – present)

== History ==
The diocese was established on 29 December 2012 from the Diocese of Makurdi.

== See also ==
- Catholic Church in Nigeria
