= Diocese of Aguleri =

Roman Catholic diocese in Nigeria

Diocese of Aguleri Dioecesis Aguleriensis

Location
- Country: Nigeria
- Territory: (Northern Anambra State) Anambra West, Anambra East, Oyi and Ayamelum
- Ecclesiastical province: Onitsha
- Metropolitan: Onitsha
- Deaneries: 6
- Coordinates: 6°20′40.560″N 6°51′34.697″E

Statistics
- Area: 1,388 km^{2} (536 sq mi)
- Population: Total; Catholics: 1,857,060; 357,965 (19.3%)
- Parishes: 63
- Schools: 162

Information
- Denomination: Roman Catholic
- Rite: Roman Rite
- Established: February 12, 2023; 3 years ago
- Cathedral: Saint Joseph Cathedral Aguleri
- Secular priests: 120

Current leadership
- Pope: Leo XIV
- His Lordship: Denis Chidi Isizoh
- Vicar General: Very Rev Professor Akwanya Nicholas

Map

Website
- https://aguleridiocese.org.

The Roman Catholic Diocese of Aguleri (Latin: Dioecesis Aguleriensis) is a diocese of the Roman Catholic Church in Nigeria.

== History ==
On 12 February 2023 the diocese was established from the archdiocesan territories of Onitsha to which it was made a suffragan diocese.

== Ordinaries ==
- Bishops of Aguleri
  - Denis Chidi Isizoh (12 February 2023 - Present)

== See also ==
- Roman Catholicism in Nigeria
