= Catholic Bishops' Conference of Nigeria =

Assembly of Catholic bishops

Catholic Bishops’ Conference of Nigeria
- Abbreviation: CBCN
- Formation: March 15, 1958; 68 years ago
- Type: Episcopal conference
- Location: Lagos, Nigeria
- Members: Catholic bishops of Nigeria
- President: Archbishop Matthew Man-Oso Ndagoso
- Vice-President: Archbishop Alfred Adewale Martins
- Parent organization: Catholic Church
- Website: cbcn-ng.org

The Catholic Bishops' Conference of Nigeria is the Catholic episcopal conference of Nigeria.

== See also ==
- Catholic Church in Nigeria
