= Joseph Shanahan =

Irish Catholic prelate

Joseph Ignatius Shanahan C.S.Sp.
- Apostolic Vicar of Southern Nigeria
- Native name: Seosamh Ó Seanacháin
- Church: Catholic Church
- See: Apostolic Vicariate of Southern Nigeria
- In office: 20 September 1905 – 21 May 1931
- Predecessor: Léon-Alexander Lejeune
- Successor: Charles Heerey
- Other post: Titular Bishop of Abila Lysaniae (1920-1943)

Orders
- Ordination: 22 April 1900
- Consecration: 6 June 1920 by Denis Kelly

Personal details
- Born: 6 June 1871 Currafrusha, Glankeen (near present-day Borrisoleigh), County Tipperary, United Kingdom of Great Britain and Ireland
- Died: 25 December 1943 (aged 72) Nairobi, Colony and Protectorate of Kenya, British Empire

Joseph Ignatius Shanahan (6 June 1871 – 25 December 1943) was an Irish Catholic prelate who served as Prefect Apostolic of Lower Niger and Vicar Apostolic of Southern Nigeria (now elevated as the Archdiocese of Onitsha).

== Early life (1871–1886) ==
=== Early life ===
Shanahan was born Currafrusha, Glankeen, Borrisoleigh, County Tipperary, Ireland on 6 June 1871. He was baptised on 7 June by Father PJ Morris, the parish priest at Borrisoleigh Parish. His father was Daniel Shanahan and his mother was Margaret Walsh from Glenmore. They married on 17 June 1864 in Templederry. The wedding was officiated by Father John Kenyon and the witnesses were John Shanahan and Mary Walsh. They had four children: Mary (born in 1865), Michael (born in 1860), John (born in 1869), and Joseph.

By 1879, Joseph had started attending school at Clohinch. In December 1884, he had transferred with his brother Richard to an older school at Gortnagoona. During his early school years, he was commonly called Joe. Joseph's confirmation name Ignatius is assumed to be taken after Ignatius of Loyola since he wrote extensively about his teaching in a spiritual notebook compilation during his novitiate in France. He served Masses on Sundays and weekdays as well as learnt Latin responses at Mass even though he was usually discouraged by his brother Michael who was already a second year juniorate student at Blackrock College. Joseph was closer and played with John.

Gortnagoona school record shows that Joseph was in class five in January 1885 when he transferred from Clohinch, and would continue study until 31 July 1886 when he must have finish class six.

=== Family ===
The Department for Education's 1892 record recognises Mary as a temporal assistant at Templederry Female from 15 May and later as an assistant from 1 October and again in 1899 as temporal assistant. She married Joseph Dawson from Maynooth on 7 November 1900 at Aughrim Street Church in Dublin. The officiating priest was Joseph. Mary and her husband supported Joseph and because of their influence, Joseph has access to Maynooth College where he carried out his pastoral work. Because they owned a garage business, they provided Joseph with a car for his missionary works in Ireland. Mary died in March 1940 when Joseph was in Nairobi and he received the news on 17 March. The Department of Education's 1884 record showed that Joseph's eldest brother Michael who attended Juniorate at Blackrock College from 1879 to 1881 had applied for assistant teacher at Clohinch Boys' School but was rejected because he was underage, hence he traveled to Australia.

The National School's record shows that John was temporal assistant at Clohinch National School in 1889. Alongside his friend Gerald, he moved to Australia on 22 December 1900 and arrived at Victoria, Australia in February 1901. They stayed at Ballarat area following the influence of Br. Adelm who had lived in Australia from 1888 to 1891. John died in 1924 and according to his death certificate, he lived for 25 years at Victoria; he was principal of St. Joseph Catholic Primary School where his wife Dora (née McMahon) taught the infant classes. John married Dora in 1910 and at the time of his death, he had three children: Kathleen aged 14, Richard Daniel aged 10, and John Francis aged 6.

== France (1886–1897) ==
Shanahan moved to France from Templederry National School for an eleven year study. He was ten years when his uncle had traveled to France. He was offered invitation to join him. He joined the Holy Ghost Order in Beauvais, France in 1886, where his uncle Pat Walsh (Brother Adelm) had also joined the Holy Ghost Fathers. He returned to Ireland, to Rockwell College, where he served as prefect and dean of studies. He was ordained in 1900 in Blackrock College, and went to Nigeria in 1902. He was instrumental in the setting up of the Kiltegan Fathers when in 1920, following his ordination in Maynooth as Bishop for Southern Nigeria (then a British protectorate) he appealed to students in Maynooth College for missionaries to Nigeria and Africa.

In 1924 Bishop Shanahan founded a missionary society for women, the Missionary Sisters of the Holy Rosary, in Killeshandra, County Cavan, Ireland.

He returned to Africa, to Kenya to act as chaplain to the Carmelite Sisters in Nairobi in 1938. Bishop Shanahan died at Nairobi, Kenya, on Christmas Day 1943 aged 72 years, and was initially buried in the community cemetery in St Mary's School in Nairobi, Kenya. However, in January 1956 his remains were brought back to Nigeria for the "second burial" in the Cathedral Basilica of the Most Holy Trinity, Onitsha.

The Bishop Shanahan National School, in Templeogue, Dublin, developed on land donated by the Holy Ghost Fathers, is named in his honour. Shanahan University is a proposed university being developed in the diocese of Onitsha.

== Episcopacy ==
Shanahan left Nigeria for Europe in July 1919 for medical treatment most probably after trekking to Cameroon in order to be fit to attend the General Chapter of the Holy Ghost Fathers Congregation in August. When he arrived at Sierra Leone, he was hospitalised with appendicitis and inflammation of the bowels yet he managed to move to Dublin from Liverpool. Arriving on 4 August, he was moved to St. Vincent Hospital under the treatment of Doctor JB. Magennis and was to stay in the hospital till the end of the month and the middle of September. He was absent during the congregation. (Note: Shanahan wasn't the only Irish delegate to have missed the Chapter because of illness. Others include: Bishop John Neville, who became sick after travelling from East Africa and was hospitalised upon arrival at Southampton hence he was replaced by Friday. Michael Downey, the superior of Blackrock; Bishop John O'Gorman received treatment in Sierra Leone but was discharged earlier to travel for the Chapter.)

Shanahan left the hospital with an option to live with his sister Mary or live in the Provincialate located in St. Mary's, Rathmines. During this time, a student journal reported that he had dinner at St. Mary's in 16 September 1919. Also, another source reported that while in the hospital, Shanahan, who learnt that Fr. Thady O'Connor was absent for medical leave from the tropics and that Fr. Edward Keen who was the Director of the Senior Scholasticate has been medically advised to take a break from academia, suggested that Fr. O'Connor take Auxiliary role at the Senior seminary while Fr. Leen replace his works in Nigeria.

== Death and legacy ==
Shanahan was renowned for initiating a formidable educational system in Igbo land.

== Sources ==
- Farragher, Seán P. (23 October 2016). "Bishop Joseph Shanahan, CSSp. Selected Studies". Internet Archive.
