= RMS St. Patrick =

RMS St. Patrick is the name of the following ships:

- RMS St. Patrick (1822)
- RMS St. Patrick (1825)
- RMS St. Patrick (1833)

== See also ==
- HMS Saint Patrick
- St. Patrick (disambiguation)
