= St. Patrick's =

St. Patrick's or Saint Patrick's may refer to:

== Associated with St. Patrick ==
- Saint Patrick, the Catholic patron saint of Ireland
- Saint Patrick's Day, the saint's feast day
- St. Patrick's blue, the saint's colour
- Saint Patrick's Saltire, a flag design that is part of the Union Jack
- Saint Patrick's Breastplate, a prayer in Old Irish
- Saint Patrick's Society for the Foreign Missions, a Catholic religious order in Ireland

== Sporting clubs ==
- St Patrick's Athletic F.C., an Irish association football club in Dublin
- St Patrick's GFC, Cullyhanna, a Gaelic football club in County Armagh
- St. Patrick's GAC Loup, a Gaelic football club in Londonderry

== Places ==
=== Australia ===
- St Patrick's Seminary, a Catholic seminary in Manly, New South Wales in Australia
- St Patrick's Cemetery, North Parramatta in Parramatta, New South Wales

=== Canada ===
- St Patrick's, Newfoundland and Labrador, a community in the Baie Verte electoral district of the Province of Newfoundland and Labrador
- St Patrick's (civil parish, Prince Edward Island) in the Province of Prince Edward Island
- Saint Patrick Parish, New Brunswick in the Province of New Brunswick

=== Ireland ===
- St Patrick's Pontifical University, Maynooth, a Catholic university and seminary in County Kildare
- St Patrick's Purgatory, a pilgrimage site in County Donegal
- St Patrick's (civil parish, Clare and Limerick)
- St Patrick's Street in Cork
- St Patrick's, Carlow College, a third level liberal arts college in Carlow
- Dublin St Patrick's, a constituency in the British Parliament that was dissolved in 1922

=== Pakistan ===
- St. Patrick's High School, Karachi, a secondary school in Karachi

=== Singapore ===
- Saint Patrick's School, Singapore, a secondary school in Singapore

=== South Africa ===
- St. Patrick's Christian Brothers' College, Kimberley

=== Sri Lanka ===
St. Patrick's College, Jaffna

=== United States ===
- Saint Patrick's Seminary and University in Menlo Park, California

== Other ==
- Saint Patrick's Battalion, an American unit which deserted & fought on the Mexican side in the Mexican–American War

== See also ==
- Saint Patrick (disambiguation)
- St. Patrick's Cathedral (disambiguation)
- St. Patrick's Church (disambiguation)
- St. Patrick's College (disambiguation)
- St. Patrick's School (disambiguation)
- St. Patrick's High School (disambiguation)
