= Saint Patrick (disambiguation) =

Saint Patrick may refer to:

- Saint Patrick, patron saint of Ireland
  - Saint Patrick's Day, a holiday celebrated on the saint's feast day
- Saint Patrick, Bishop of Prusa

== Places ==
- Saint Patrick Parish, Dominica
- Saint Patrick Parish, Grenada
- Saint Patrick Parish, New Brunswick, Canada
- Saint Patrick Parish, Saint Vincent and the Grenadines
- St. Patrick (provincial electoral district), a defunct district in Ontario, Canada
- St. Patrick (TTC), a subway station in Toronto, Ontario, Canada
- St. Patrick, Minnesota, US
- St. Patrick, Missouri, US
- St. Patrick, Ohio, US

== Ships ==
- HMS Saint Patrick, a Royal Navy ship, in service 1666–1667
- RMS St. Patrick, several ships
- ST St Patrick, a tugboat
- TSS St Patrick
- TrSS St Patrick
- St Patrick, ro-pax ferry, built 2002
- MS St Patrick II

== Other ==
- St Patrick (horse), a racehorse
- "St. Patrick", 2014 song from White Noise by PVRIS

== See also ==
- St. Patrick's (disambiguation)
- St. Patrick's Cathedral (disambiguation)
- St. Patrick's Church (disambiguation)
- St. Patrick's College (disambiguation)
- St. Patrick's School (disambiguation)
- St. Patrick's High School (disambiguation)
- San Patricio, Spanish for Saint Patrick
