= Patrick =

Patrick may refer to:

- Patrick (given name), list of people and fictional characters with this name
- Patrick (surname), list of people with this name

== People ==
- Saint Patrick (c. 385–c. 461), Christian saint
- Gilla Pátraic (died 1084), Patrick or Patricius, Bishop of Dublin
- Patrick, 1st Earl of Salisbury (c. 1122–1168), Anglo-Norman nobleman
- Patrick (footballer, born 1983), Brazilian right-back
- Patrick (footballer, born 1985), Brazilian striker
- Patrick (footballer, born 1992), Brazilian midfielder
- Patrick (footballer, born 1994), Brazilian right-back
- Patrick (footballer, born May 1998), Brazilian forward
- Patrick (footballer, born November 1998), Brazilian attacking midfielder
- Patrick (footballer, born 1999), Brazilian defender
- Patrick (footballer, born 2000), Brazilian defender
- John Byrne (Scottish playwright) (born 1940), also a painter under the pseudonym Patrick
- Don Harris (wrestler) (born 1960), American professional wrestler who uses the ring name Patrick

== Multimedia ==
=== Films ===
- Patrick (1978 film), an Australian horror film
- Patrick (2013 film), an Australian remake of the 1978 film
- Patrick (2018 film), a British comedy film
- Patrick (2019 film), a Belgian comedy-drama film

== Places ==
- Patrick, Queensland, Barcaldine Region, Queensland, Australia
- Patrick (parish), Isle of Man
- Patrick, South Carolina, US
- Patrick County, Virginia, US

== Organisations ==
- Patrick (sportswear company), founded in 1892
- Patrick Corporation, an Australian transport company
- Patrick Division, a former division in the NHL

== See also ==
- Croagh Patrick, a mountain in the west of Ireland
- Patric (disambiguation)
- Partick (disambiguation)
- Saint Patrick (disambiguation)
- St. Patrick's (disambiguation)
