= Cathedral of Our Lady of Assumption =

Roman Catholic church in Nnewi

Coordinates: 6.0229°N 6.9218°E

- Cathedral of Our Lady of Assumption
- Location: Nnewi, Anambra State
- Country: Nigeria
- Denomination: Catholic Church
- Tradition: Latin Church

History
- Status: Cathedral
- Dedicated: 14 January 2026

Architecture
- Functional status: Active
- Architectural type: Church

Administration
- Diocese: Nnewi

Clergy
- Bishop: Jonas Benson Okoye

The Cathedral of Our Lady of Assumption is a Roman Catholic church located in Nnewi, Anambra State, Nigeria. Dedicated to Blessed Virgin Mary, the cathedral serves as the seat of the bishop of Nnewi.

== History ==
The Diocese of Nnewi is a suffragan diocese created from the Archdiocese of Onitsha on 28 November 2001. The church project to serve as a central local church of Nnewi was already initiated by the Nnewi Catholic Community before the diocese was created. In the 2010s, the project was reportedly built by the community with Ifeanyi Ubah as the major donor, however in 2022, the diocese formally assume control of the construction through its building committee. The cathedral was dedicated on 14 January 2026.
