= Diocese of Awka =

Roman Catholic diocese in Nigeria

Diocese of Awka Dioecesis Avkaensis
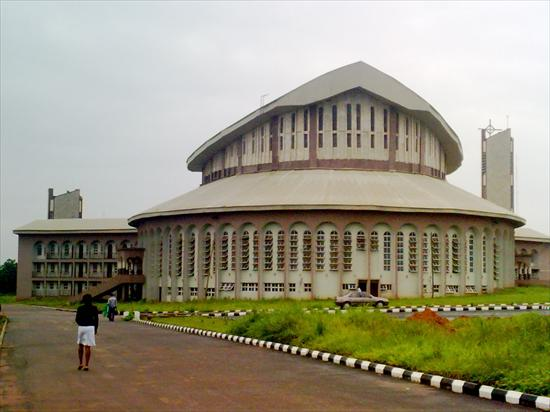
- Saint Patrick Cathedral, Awka

Location
- Country: Nigeria
- Territory: a portion of Anambra State
- Ecclesiastical province: Onitsha
- Metropolitan: Archbishop of Onitsha
- Coordinates: 6°12′25″N 7°04′04″E

Statistics
- Area: 775 km^{2} (299 sq mi)
- Population: Total; Catholics: (as of 2022); 433,300; 306,830 (70.8%)
- Parishes: 111

Information
- Denomination: Roman Catholic
- Rite: Latin Rite
- Established: 10 November 1977
- Cathedral: St. Patrick's Cathedral
- Secular priests: 271

Current leadership
- Pope: Leo XIV
- Bishop: Most Rev. Paulinus Chukwuemeka Ezeokafor

Map
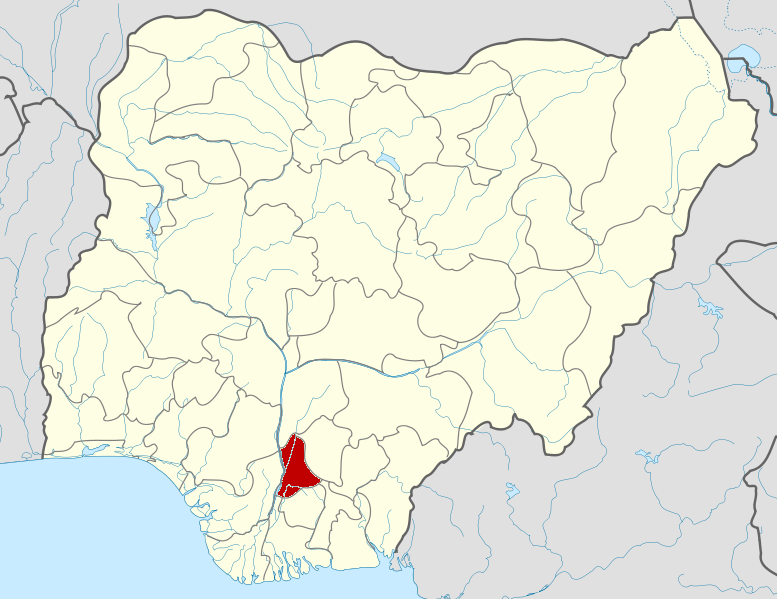
- Awka is located in Anambra State which is shown here in red.

The Roman Catholic Diocese of Awka (Latin: Avkaën(sis)) is a diocese located in the city of Awka, Anambra State in the ecclesiastical province of Onitsha in Nigeria.

== History ==
- 10 November 1977: Established as Diocese of Awka from the Metropolitan Archdiocese of Onitsha
- 5 March 2020: Lost territory to the newly created Diocese of Ekwulobia

== Universities ==
- Peter University, Achina-Onneh

== Special churches ==
The Cathedral is St. Patrick's Cathedral in Awka.

== Bishops ==
- Bishops of Awka (Roman rite)
  - Bishop Albert Kanene Obiefuna (10 November 1977 Appointed - 9 September 1994 Appointed, Coadjutor Archbishop of Onitsha)
  - Bishop Simon Akwali Okafor (9 September 1994 Appointed - 17 April 2010 Retired)
  - Bishop Paulinus Chukwuemeka Ezeokafor (8 July 2011 – present)

=== Auxiliary Bishops ===
- Solomon Amanchukwu Amatu (2000-2005), appointed Coadjutor Bishop of Okigwe
- Paulinus Chukwuemeka Ezeokafor (2007-2011), appointed Bishop here
- Simon Akwali Okafor (1992-1994), appointed Bishop here
- Jonas Benson Okoye (2014-2021)

=== Other priest of this diocese who became bishop ===
- Peter Ebere Okpaleke, appointed Bishop of Ahara in 2012

== See also ==
- Roman Catholicism in Nigeria

== Sources ==
- GCatholic.org Information
- Catholic Hierarchy
