= St Patrick's College =

Saint Patrick's College may refer to:

== Australia ==
- St Patrick's College, Ballarat, Victoria
- St Patrick's College, Campbelltown, New South Wales
- St Patrick's College, East Melbourne, Victoria
- St Patrick's College, Goulburn, New South Wales (closed 2000)
- St Patrick's College, Gympie, Queensland
- St Patrick's College, Mackay, Queensland
- St Patrick's College, Manly, a seminary in New South Wales
- St Patrick's College, Shorncliffe, Brisbane, Queensland
- St Patrick's College, Strathfield, New South Wales
- St Patrick's College, Sutherland, New South Wales
- St Patrick's College, Townsville, Queensland
- St Patrick's Technical College, Edinburgh North, South Australia

== Ireland ==
- St. Patrick's, Carlow College, a third level college
- St Patrick's College, Cavan, an all-male secondary school
- St Patrick's College, Dublin, a former teacher training college affiliated to Dublin City University
- Coláiste Phádraig (Lucan), a secondary school for boys in County Dublin
- St Patrick's College, Maynooth, a pontifical university and national seminary
- St. Patrick's College, Thurles, a teacher training college affiliated to University of Limerick
- St. Patrick's College, Tuam, a former secondary school for boys in County Galway

== United Kingdom ==
- St Patrick's College, Armagh, now part of St Patrick's Grammar School
- St Patrick's College, Ballymena, County Antrim
- St Patrick's College, Banbridge, County Down
- St Patrick's College, Belfast, a former secondary school
- St. Patrick's College, Dungannon, a voluntary grammar school in County Tyrone
- St. Patrick's College, Knock, a Roman Catholic diocesan grammar school in Belfast
- St Patrick's College, Maghera, County Londonderry
- St Patrick's College, London, a private higher education college at Tower Hill
- St Patrick's Catholic College, Thornaby-on-Tees, North Yorkshire
- St Patrick's and St Brigid's College, Claudy, County Londonderry

== Other countries ==
- St. Patrick's College (Ottawa), a former part of Carleton University, Canada
- St. Patrick's College, Silverstream, Upper Hutt, New Zealand
- St. Patrick's College, Wellington, New Zealand
- St. Patrick's College (Karachi), affiliated with the University of Karachi, Pakistan
- St. Patrick's College, South Africa, a co-educational boarding school in Kokstad, KwaZulu Natal
- St. Patrick's College, Jaffna, a private school in Gurunagar, Sri Lanka

== See also ==
- St. Patrick's High School (disambiguation)
- St. Patrick's School (disambiguation)
- St. Patrick's (disambiguation)
