= Simon Akwali Okafor =

Nigerian Catholic bishop (1934–2014)

- Bishop of Awka
- Church: Catholic Church
- Diocese: Diocese of Awka
- In office: 9 September 1994 – 17 April 2010
- Predecessor: Albert Obiefuna
- Successor: Paulinus Ezeokafor
- Previous posts: Titular Bishop of Augurus (1992-1994); Auxiliary Bishop of Awka (1992-1994)

Orders
- Ordination: 21 July 1963 by Godfrey Okoye
- Consecration: 30 May 1992 by Francis Arinze

Personal details
- Born: 16 November 1934 Ifiteukpo (present-day Ifitedunu), Onitsha Province, Colony and Protectorate of Nigeria, British Empire
- Died: 29 August 2014 (aged 79)

Simon Akwali Okafor (16 November 1934 – 29 August 2014) was a Roman Catholic bishop.

Born in the old Ifiteukpo, now Ifitedunu in Dunukofia Local Government Area of Anambra State, Nigeria on 16 November 1934, to Ogbuefi Okafor and Ifeoma Okafor, Bishop Okafor was ordained as a priest on 21 July 1963 at the age of 29 by Bishop Godfrey Mary Okoye, C.S.Sp.

Okafor was appointed titular bishop of Augurus and auxiliary bishop of the Roman Catholic Diocese of Awka, Nigeria, in 1992.

On 9 September 1994, Bishop Simon Akwali Okafor, was appointed 2nd Catholic Bishop of Awka Diocese at the age of 59+, and retired on 17 April 2010 and the age of 75.

He died on Friday, 29 August 2014 at the age of 80, as Bishop Emeritus of Awka, and was buried on Tuesday, 7 October 2014 at the Crept Chapel, St Patrick's Cathedral. Awka.

As a priest, he served as the Secretary to the then Catholic Archbishop of the Old Onitsha Archdiocese (now Cardinal Francis Arinze)

As an educationist he was a lecturer and a Provost of the former College of Education in Awka.

Notes: Archives by Ifeoma Ezenyilimba of Fides Media Ltd
