= Patric =

Patric may refer to:

- PATRIC, the Pathosystems Resource Integration Center, a bacterial infectious disease information system
- Patric (singer) (born 1947), full name Patrick Martin, French singer
- Patric (footballer, born 1987), full name Anderson Patric Aguiar Oliveira, Brazilian football forward
- Patric (footballer, born 1989), full name Patric Cabral Lalau, Brazilian football right-back
- Patric (Spanish footballer) (born 1993), full name Patricio Gabarrón Gil, Spanish football right-back

== See also ==
- Patrick (disambiguation), various meanings including a given name and a surname
