= San Patricio =

San Patricio is Spanish for "Saint Patrick". As a name it may have several meanings:

== Places ==
- San Patricio del Chañar, town in Argentina
- San Patricio, Chile, a village in south-central Chile
- San Patricio, Jalisco, community in Jalisco state, Mexico
- San Patricio, New Mexico, community in Lincoln County, U.S.
- San Patricio, Paraguay
- San Patricio, Ponce, Puerto Rico, barrio
  - San Patricio River (Río de San Patricio), Puerto Rico
- San Patricio, Texas, U.S. city
- San Patricio County, Texas, on the Gulf Coast, U.S.
- Avenida San Patricio (San Patricio Avenue), street and neighborhood in Guaynabo, Puerto Rico
  - San Patricio Plaza, shopping mall in Guaynabo, Puerto Rico

== Others ==
- Battle of San Patricio in the Texas Revolution
- Saint Patrick's Battalion (Batallón de San Patricio), mostly-Irish (-American) expatriate unit in the Mexican-American War
  - San Patricio (album), a 2010 album by the Chieftains
- SS San Patricio, Chilean (and Liberian) cargo ship, mid-20th century
- San Patricio Church massacre, in Argentina

== See also ==
- Saint Patrick (disambiguation)
