= South Lotts =

Neighbourhood of Dublin

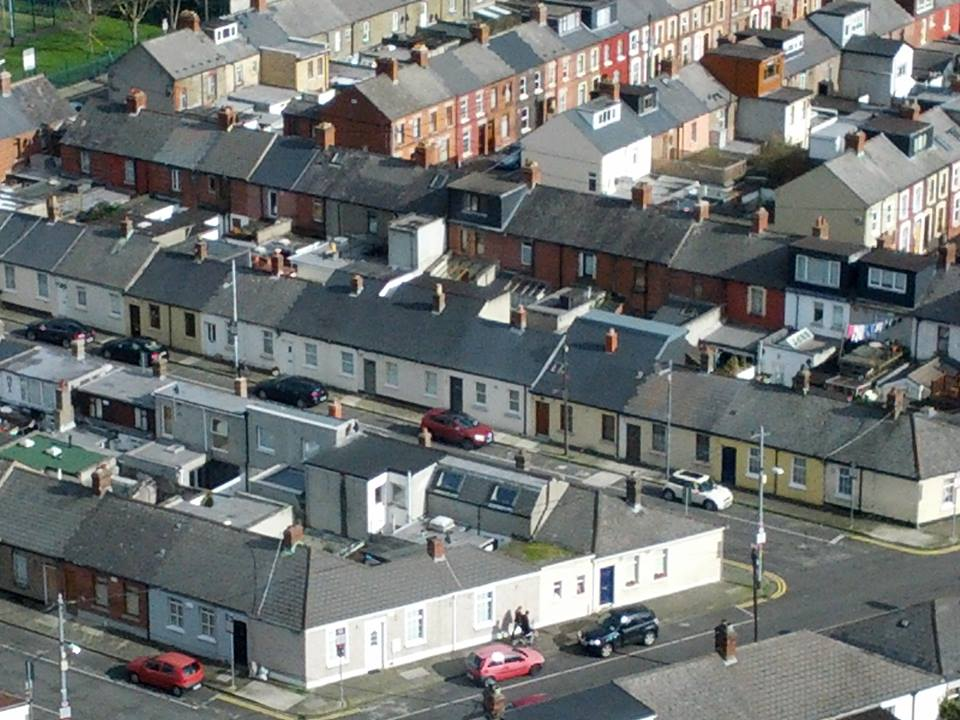
View of South Lotts from top floor of the Google Docks (Montevetro) building. The corner of South Dock Street Park can be seen as well as houses on South Dock, Gordon, Howard, Hope, Joy, Penrose, and Doris Streets.

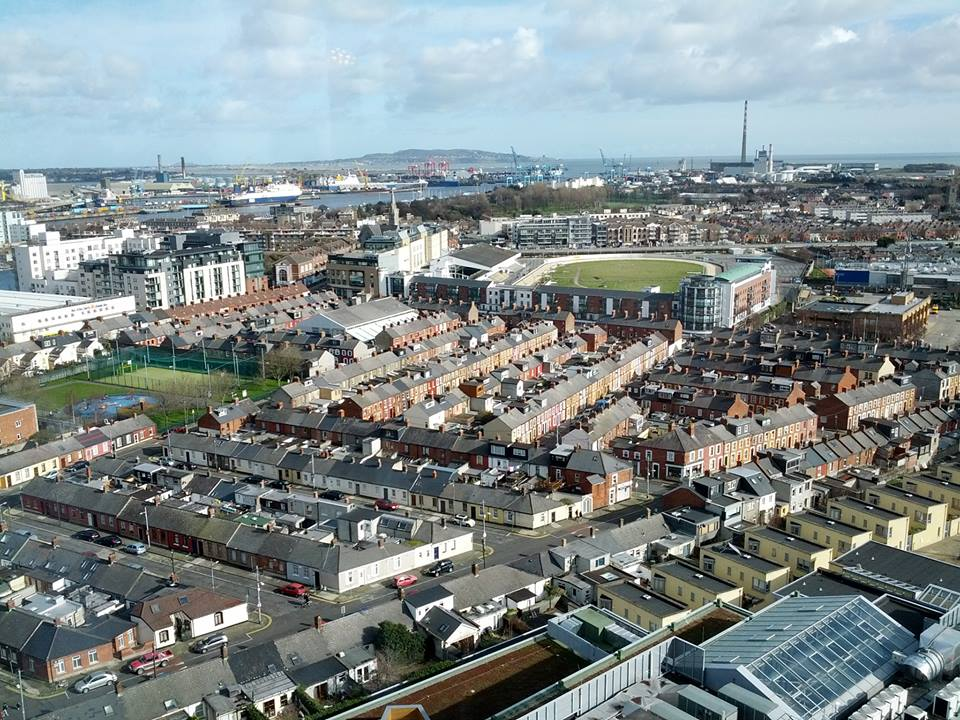
Broader view of Ringsend from the Montevetro building

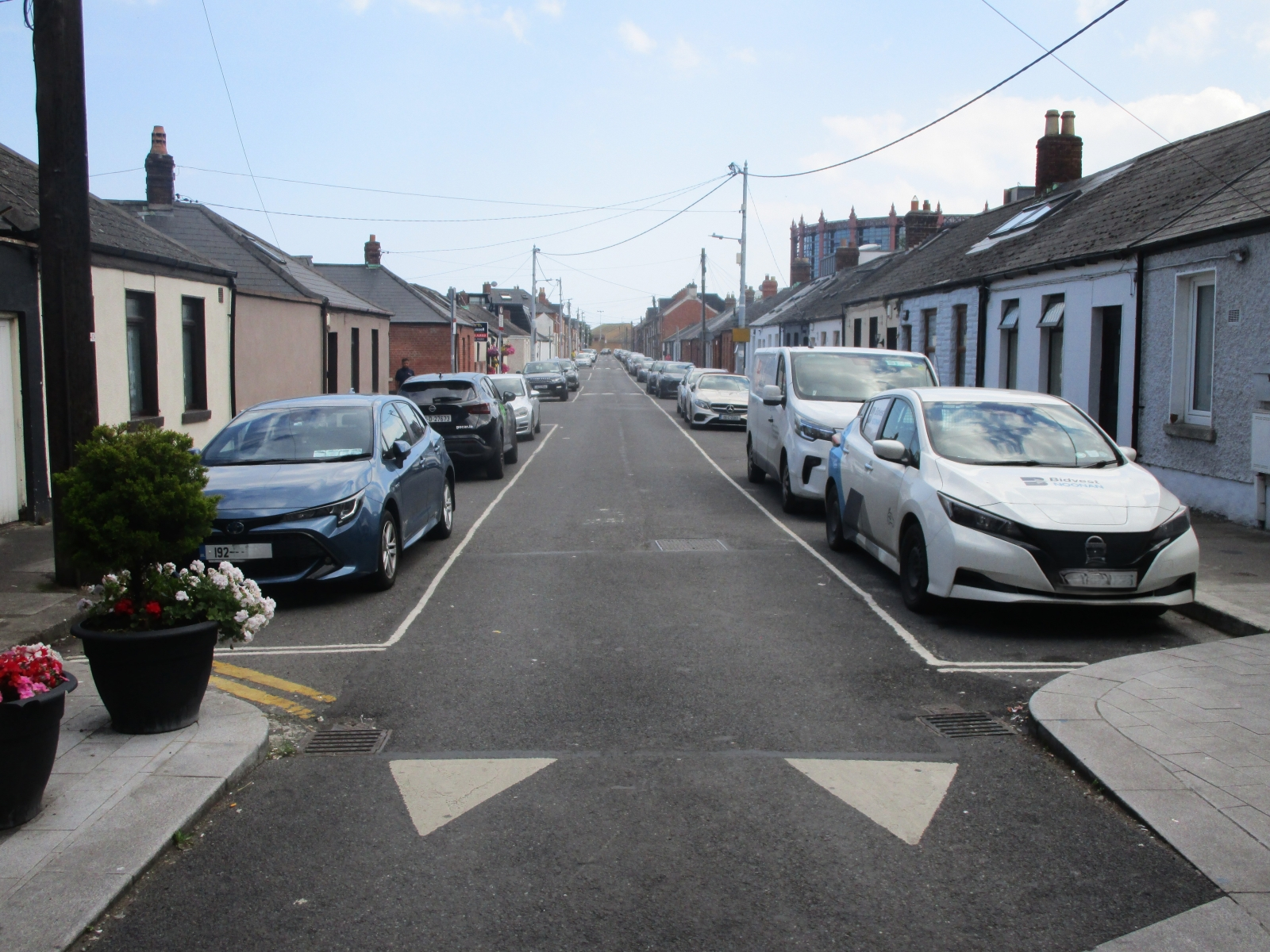
Gordon Street seen from the Barrow Street

South Lotts is a small area to the south of the river Liffey in inner-city Dublin 4, one km east of Dublin City Centre, Ireland. It was created following the embankment of the River Liffey in 1711 between the city and Ringsend, thereby reclaiming the marshes as North and South Lotts. It is at the westernmost end of Ringsend, overlapping with the Grand Canal Dock area, but is generally accepted to be within Ringsend.

The district originally referred to 51 reclaimed plots of land directly behind City Quay which were sold to the highest bidder in 1723. A detailed history of South Lotts is given in the 2008 book Dublin Docklands - An Urban Voyage by Turtle Bunbury, in the chapter "The Docklands - South Lotts & Poolbeg".

== Boundaries and streets ==
South Lotts is bordered to the north by Ringsend Road, to the west by Barrow Street, to the east by South Lotts Road and to the south by Grand Canal Street.

Streets included in South Lotts are:

- Barrow Street
- Doris Street - Possibly named after William Doris, an Irish Member of Parliament and Chief Whip of the Irish Parliamentary Party (1910–1918).
- Gerald Street - Possibly named for Samuel Beckett’s uncle Dr Gerald Beckett (1884-1950), County Wicklow Medical Officer and sometime president of Greystones Golf Club. Gerald’s brother James built the cottages.
- Gordon Street - Named for Charles George Gordon (1833 – 1885)
- Hastings Street - Named for Francis Rawdon Hastings (1754-1826)
- Hope Street - Named for the spirit of hope that accompanied these new constructions
- Howard Street - Probably named for Howard Beckett, son of William, brother of Gerald and James, and uncle of Samuel Beckett the playwright
- Joy Street
- Ormeau Street
- Penrose Street - Possibly named by Ringsend glassworkers after George and William Penrose who founded the Penrose Glass House in Waterford in 1783. The company later became Waterford Crystal
- Somerset Street - Probably named for Edward Seymour, 12th Duke of Somerset (1804 – 1886), a staunch opponent of Gladstone’s Irish policies. His wife was a granddaughter of the playwright Richard Brinsley Sheridan
- South Dock Place
- South Dock Street
- South Lotts Road

== Buildings ==
The South Lotts includes the area south of Gordon Street which has been developed by an Irish property developer (now in receivership) into an area called The Gasworks. It includes a flat complex as well as the home of Google's European headquarters in the Gasworks House and Gordon House - along with the Google Docks (previously the Montevetro) building, Dublin's tallest commercial building - across Barrow Street in the Grand Canal Dock area.

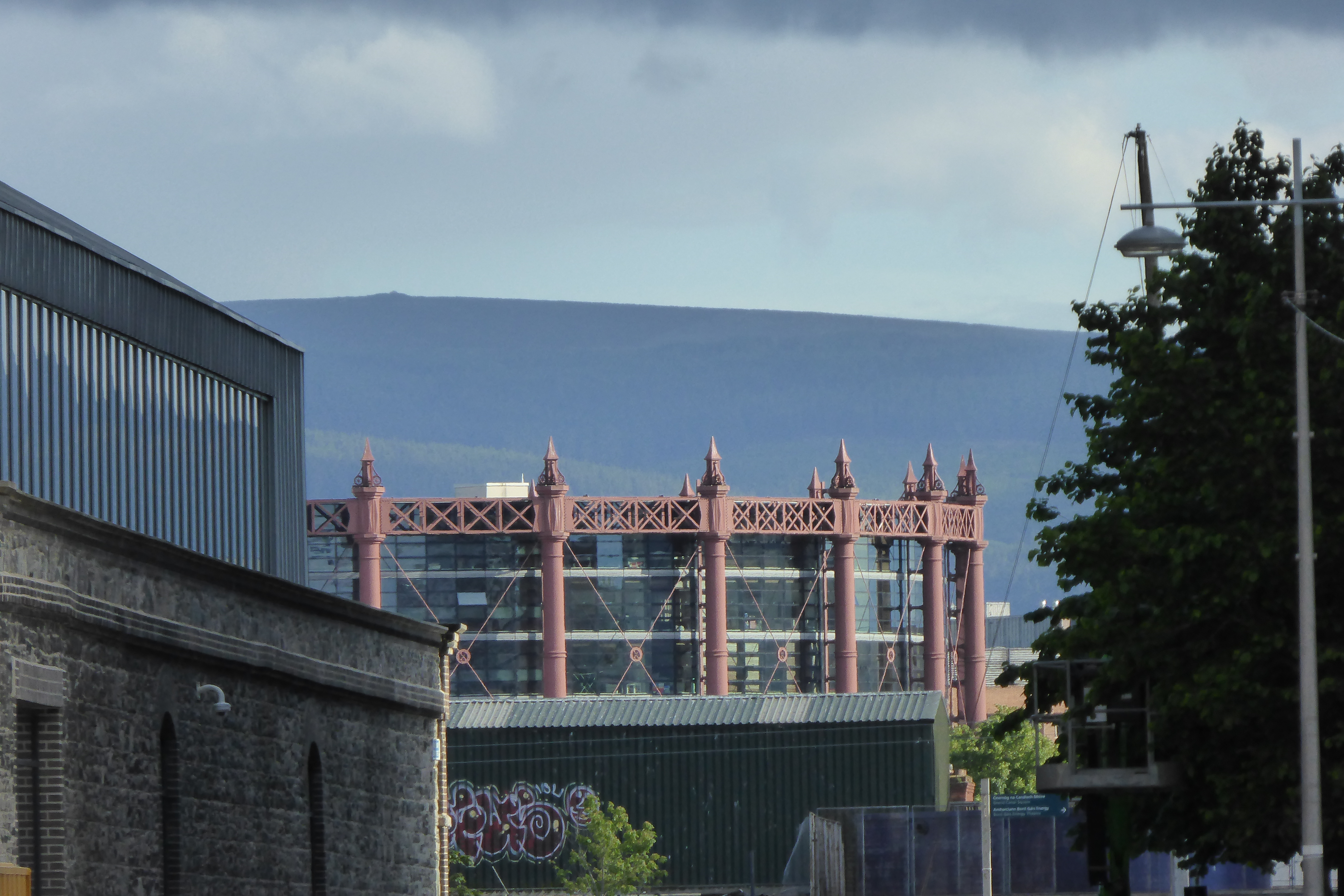
The Gasworks apartments inside the gasometer frame

The flat complex includes the Alliance building - originally a gasometer, converted into a block of apartments. The building was owned by Liam Carroll's Zoe Developments originally, but the company went into receivership. Forty of the apartments were sold but none of those who paid deposits went on to sign contracts and many left as they realised the apartments were overpriced. Zoe Developments applied for and received permission from Dublin City Council to convert the building into a hotel, but it shortly turned out that a combination of too many hotel rooms and price-cutting meant there was no market for that either.

South Lotts is known more as the area of single and double-storey terraced houses which were built between 1890 and 1910 to house the dockers working locally. The area was developed by James Beckett. The two-storied dwellings are typically red-bricked, two up, two down terraced houses with a small backyard. They are fronted directly onto the footpath.

The two up two down houses were built in the Belfast style with two rooms upstairs and two rooms downstairs. The houses have two upstairs windows and a single larger window downstairs overlooking the street. The lavatory was built within the backyard when built at first. The facades are red bricked with blonde bricks around the door and windows.

Some of the houses in the area were built without the blonde bricks, however, the decoration is with granite support plinths above the windows and doors. Each house originally contained a large fireplace in the front room downstairs and a smaller cast iron fireplace in the upstairs front and back rooms. Between the houses are older reclaimed bricks. Those bricks are believed to have been reclaimed from brick houses knocked down elsewhere in Dublin.

The single-storied houses are at the west end of South Lotts. Many have been converted to include a second storey, mostly not visible from the street.

A number of commercial businesses operate in the South Lotts area including Ringsend's post office (inside the Eurospar on Barrow Street), coffee shops, a sandwich bar and a beauty salon.

== Media ==
The area has been used as a location in four major studio films:

- In the Name of the Father
- Educating Rita (Joy and Penrose Streets)
- The General
- Nothing Personal

Advertising agencies have also filmed and photographed in the area for various commercials such as Eir and Vodafone. Marriage Equality Ireland's video "Sinead's Hand" (2009) featured a number of South Lotts scenes (link).
