= St. Patrick's High School =

St. Patrick High School, St. Patrick's High School and other variants may refer to:

In Canada:

- St. Patrick's High School (Halifax) in Halifax, Nova Scotia
- St. Patrick's High School (Ottawa) in Ottawa, Ontario
- St. Patrick's Catholic High School in Sarnia, Ontario
- St. Patrick High School (Thunder Bay) in Thunder Bay, Ontario
- St. Patrick Catholic Secondary School in Toronto
- École St. Patrick High School in Yellowknife, Northwest Territories
- St. Patrick's High School (Quebec City) in Quebec City, Quebec
- St. Patrick Regional Secondary School in Vancouver, British Columbia

In India

- St. Patrick's Higher Secondary School, Asansol, India
- St. Patrick's High School, Secunderabad, India

In Kenya:

- St. Patrick's High School (Iten, Kenya)

In Liberia:

- St. Patrick's High School (Liberia)

In Pakistan

- St Patrick's High School, Karachi, Sindh, Pakistan

In the United Kingdom:

- St Patrick's and St. Brigid's College, in Claudy, Northern Ireland
- St Patrick's High School (Keady), in Keady, Northern Ireland
- St Patrick's Roman Catholic High School, in Eccles, England

In the United States:

- St. Patrick High School (Chicago), Illinois
- St. Patrick's High School (Maysville, Kentucky)
- St. Patrick High School (Portland, Michigan)
- St. Patrick Catholic High School (Biloxi, Mississippi)
- St. Patrick High School (North Platte, Nebraska)
- St. Patrick High School (New Jersey) in Elizabeth, New Jersey

== See also ==
- St. Patrick's College (disambiguation)
- St. Patrick's School (disambiguation)
