= St. Patrick's Church, Lookout =

St. Patrick's Church
- St. Patrick's Church
- 16°47′21″N 62°11′17″W
- Location: Lookout
- Country: Montserrat; United Kingdom
- Denomination: Roman Catholic Church

The St. Patrick's Church is a religious building of the Catholic Church which is located in the town of Lookout on the Caribbean island of Montserrat, part of the Lesser Antilles and a British overseas territory.

The temple follows the Roman or Latin rite and depends on the missions of Divine Mercy which is under the jurisdiction of the Diocese of Saint John's - Basseterre (Dioecesis Sancti Ioannis Imatellurana).

In 1997 the church was affected by a volcanic eruption that caused damage to much of the island, and only until 2009 could complete the reconstruction and reopening of the temple.

== See also ==
- Roman Catholicism in the United Kingdom
- St. Patrick's Church (disambiguation)
