= Jonas Benson Okoye =

Nigerian Catholic prelate

- Bishop of Nnewi
- Church: Catholic Church
- Diocese: Diocese of Nnewi
- Appointed: 9 November 2021
- Predecessor: Hilary Paul Odili Okeke
- Previous posts: Titular Bishop of Masclianae (2014-2021); Auxiliary Bishop of Awka (2014-2021)

Orders
- Ordination: 29 August 1992 by Albert Obiefuna
- Consecration: 29 August 2014 by Augustine Kasujja

Personal details
- Born: 25 January 1963 (age 63) Kaduna, Northern Region, Federation of Nigeria

Jonas Benson Okoye (born 25 January 1963) is a Nigerian Catholic prelate who has served as the bishop of the Diocese of Nnewi since 9 November 2021.

== Biography ==
Okoye was ordained a priest on 29 August 1992. On May 30, 2014, he was appointed the titular bishop of Masclianae and auxiliary bishop of Awka by Pope Francis. He was consecrated a bishop by the Apostolic Nuncio to Nigeria, Archbishop Augustine Kasujja, on August 29 of the same year. The co-consecrators were the Archbishop of Onitsha, Valerian Okeke, and the Bishop of Awka, Paulinus Ezeokafor. On November 9, 2021, Pope Francis appointed him Bishop of Nnewi and his installation took place on February 10, 2022.
