= St. Patrick's Church, Carriacou =

St. Patrick's Church
- St. Patrick's Church
- Location: Carriacou
- Country: Grenada
- Denomination: Roman Catholic Church

The St. Patrick's Church is a religious building belonging to the Catholic Church and is located in the town of Hillsborough the main town of the island of Carriacou, the largest and most populous in the Grenadine Islands center that is part of Grenada.

The temple follows the Roman or Latin rite and depends on the Catholic Diocese of Saint George in Granada (Dioecesis Sancti Georgii). It was dedicated to St. Patrick, a Catholic missionary who is known as the patron saint of Ireland. Religious services are offered entirely in English. Not to be confused with another church dedicated to San Patricio located in Sauteurs on the main island of Grenada.

== See also ==
- Roman Catholicism in Grenada
- St. Patrick's Church (disambiguation)
