= St. Patrick's Cathedral =

St. Patrick's Cathedral may refer to:

== Australia ==
- St Patrick's Basilica, Fremantle, Western Australia
- St Patrick's Cathedral, Ballarat, Roman Catholic Diocese of Ballarat, Victoria
- St Patrick's Cathedral, Melbourne, Victoria
- St Patrick's Cathedral, Parramatta, New South Wales
- St Patrick's Cathedral, Toowoomba, Queensland
- St Patrick's Cathedral, Bunbury, Western Australia

== Barbados ==
- St. Patrick's Cathedral, Bridgetown

== Canada ==
- St. Patrick's Basilica, Montreal, Quebec
- St Patrick's Basilica, Ottawa, Ontario
- St. Patrick's Cathedral, Thunder Bay, Ontario
- St. Patrick's Church, St. John's, Newfoundland

== India ==
- St Patrick's Cathedral, Pune

== Northern Ireland ==
- St Patrick's Cathedral, Armagh (Church of Ireland)
- St Patrick's Cathedral, Armagh (Roman Catholic)

== Republic of Ireland ==
- St Patrick's Cathedral, Dublin (Church of Ireland)
- St Patrick's Cathedral, Trim, County Meath (Church of Ireland)
- St. Patrick's Cathedral, Skibbereen, County Cork (Roman Catholic)
- St Patrick's Cathedral, Killala, County Mayo (Church of Ireland)

== Lesotho ==
- St. Patrick's Cathedral, Mohale's Hoek

== Madagascar ==
- St Patrick's Cathedral, Andranomena, Toliara

== United States ==
- Our Lady of La Vang Parish, formerly Saint Patrick Proto-Cathedral Parish, California
- Cathedral of Saint Patrick (Norwich, Connecticut)
- St. Patrick's Co-Cathedral (Billings, Montana)
- Pro-Cathedral of Saint Patrick in Newark, New Jersey
- St. Patrick's Cathedral (Midtown Manhattan), New York City
- St. Patrick's Old Cathedral, Lower Manhattan, New York City
- Cathedral of Saint Patrick (Charlotte, North Carolina)
- Cathedral of Saint Patrick (Harrisburg, Pennsylvania)
- Cathedral Parish of Saint Patrick (El Paso, Texas)
- St. Patrick Cathedral (Fort Worth, Texas)

== Elsewhere ==
- St Patrick's Cathedral, Auckland, New Zealand
- Saint Patrick's Cathedral, Karachi, Pakistan
- St. Patrick's Cathedral, Awka

== Other ==
- "St. Patrick's Cathedral", instrumental pieces of music on The Dubliners' album Further Along from 1996

== See also ==
- St. Patrick's Church
- Saint Patrick
- Saint Patrick's Day
- Saint Patrick (disambiguation)
