= École St. Joseph School =

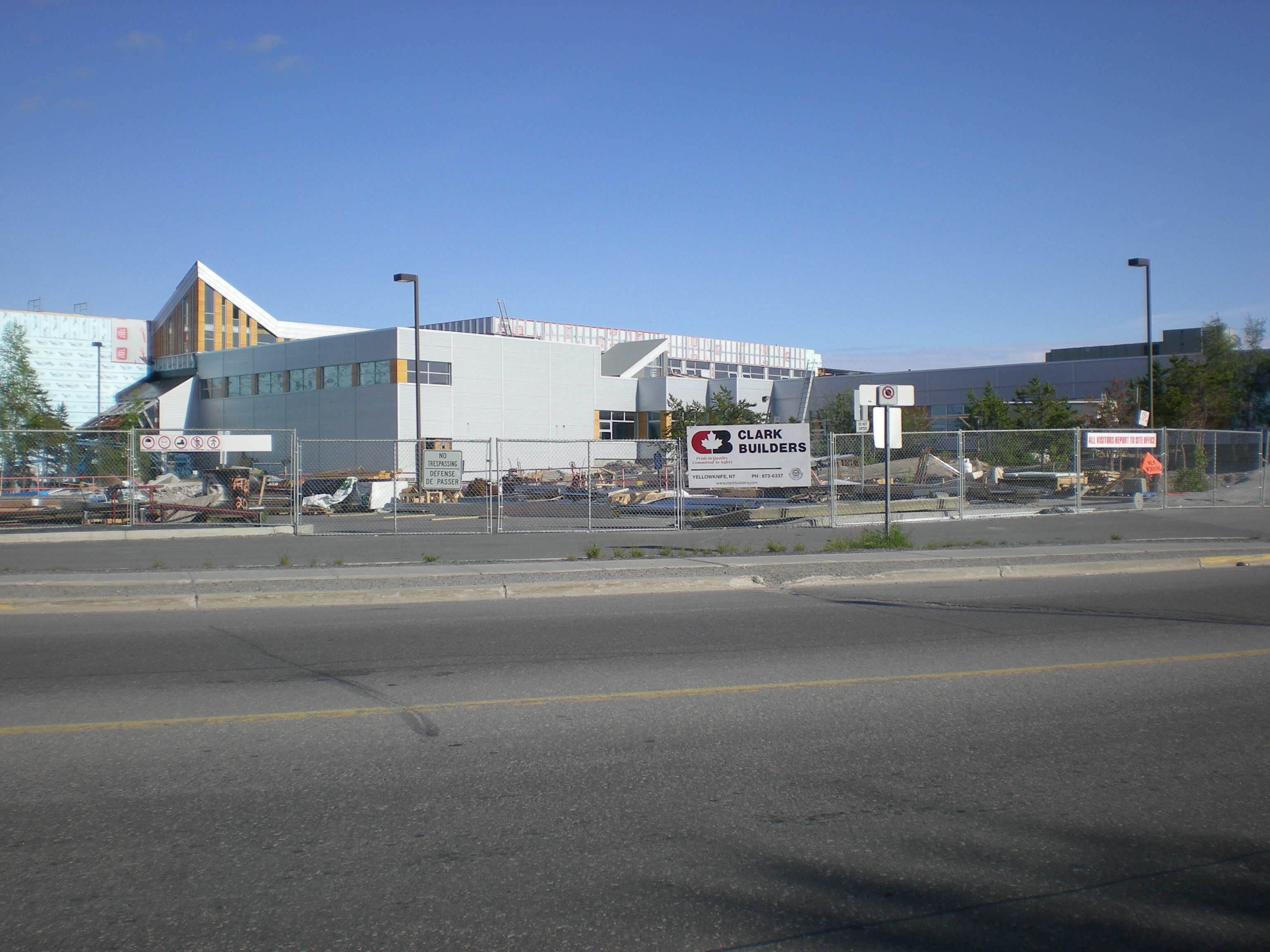

Location
- 489 Range Lake Road; Yellowknife, Northwest Territories, X1A 2N5; Canada; 62°26′37″N 114°24′38″W

Information
- School type: middle school
- Religious affiliation: Catholic
- Established: 1978
- School board: Yellowknife Catholic School Board
- Superintendent: Adam Murray
- Principal: Alicia Larade
- Staff: 60
- Grades: K-7
- Enrollment: 550
- Language: English, French immersion
- Website: www.ycs.nt.ca/st-joseph/

École St. Joseph School is an elementary/middle school in Yellowknife, Northwest Territories, Canada, operated by the Yellowknife Catholic School Board. The school was opened in September 1978 and is named in honour of the Sisters of St. Joseph.

In addition to English, St. Joseph's offers the French immersion program for all students. The school had a severe fire caused by arson in 2006, causing the students in the 2006–2007 school year to be held at three different schools. The school went through major renovations until 2010 when all students were brought back to the main building.

== See also ==
- List of schools in the Northwest Territories
