= RMS St. Patrick (1822) =

British ship

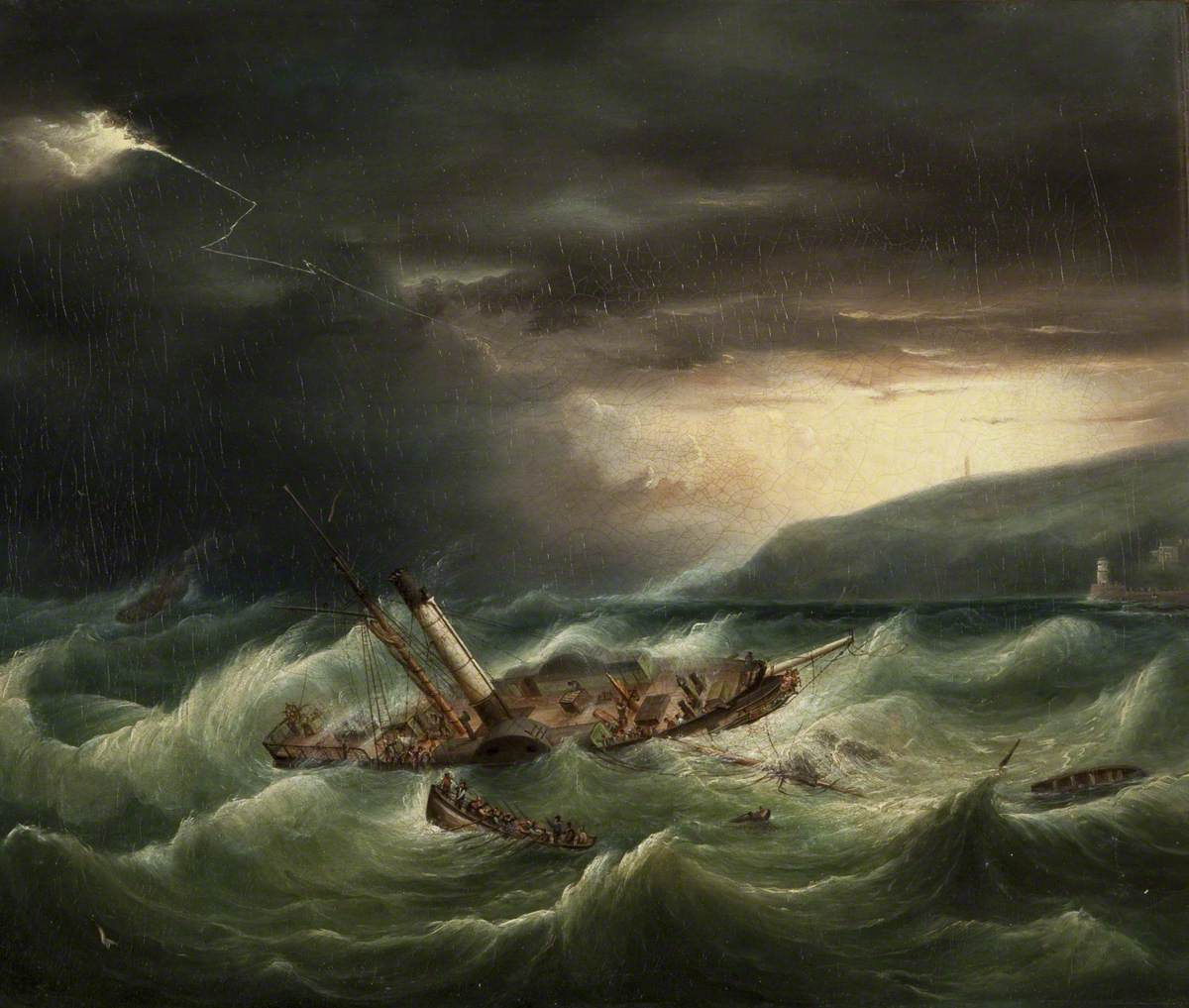
- The St. Patrick's sister ship, St. George, sinking in 1830

History

United Kingdom
- Name: RMS St. Patrick
- Owner: T. Lance, K. Pringle, J. Watson and others
- Operator: St George Steam Packet Company
- Port of registry: Liverpool
- Route: Bristol–Dublin–Liverpool–Bristol (1822, 1823–1824); Cork–Bristol (Aug 1822 – Sep 1823); Lisbon–Porto (1824–1832)
- Ordered: 1821/22
- Builder: Mottershead & Hayes, engine by Fawcett, Preston & Co., Liverpool
- Launched: 21 April 1822, 22 April 1822
- Out of service: Sold to Joao Baptista Angelo da Costa and Co. 1824

Portugal
- Name: SS Restaurador Lusitano
- Acquired: 12 April 1824
- In service: 1832
- Out of service: 11 September 1832
- Fate: Sunk 11 September 1832

General characteristics
- Tons burthen: 173
- Length: 130 ft (40 m)
- Beam: 22.08 ft (6.73 m)
- Draught: 13.66 ft (4.16 m)
- Propulsion: Paddle wheels; Double engine; 55 hp (41 kW); Three masts
- Speed: 10 knots

The first RMS St Patrick of the St. George Steam Packet Company was a wooden paddle steamer, launched by Mottershead & Hayes of Liverpool on 22 April 1822 (Note: note that Kennedy, John (1903). The History of Steam Navigation (PDF). Liverpool. p. 37. says 21 April at 10:30) for passenger service. The ship first served on the line's Dublin to Liverpool route, with a stopover in Bristol. The ship was sold in 1824 to Portuguese interests and renamed the ship Restaurador Lusitano, which operated on the Lisbon to Porto route. Civil war broke out in 1828 and the vessel was chartered for service by the Absolutists in 1832. While sailing with troops and supplies, Restaurador Lusitano was severely damaged in a storm while attempting to aid another vessel in trouble. The damage was too much and Restaurador Lusitano sank on 11 September 1832.

== Description ==
The builder's registration on 27 April 1822 stated the ship had a tonnage of 173 tons, was 130 feet (40 m) long with a beam of 20 feet 1 inch (6.12 m) and a draught of 13 feet 8 inches (4.17 m). St Patrick was powered by a double engine of 55 horsepower (41 kW) made by Fawcett, Preston & Co. of Liverpool.

== Construction and career ==
St. Patrick was launched at 10:30am on 21 April 1822 (although another source says 22 April, without a time) and her sister the St. George was launched the following day. This excited those in Liverpool as she was the first steamer built in the port, and the finest ship built there yet. She was registered as BT107 in Liverpool on 29 April 1822 to T. Lance, K. Pringle, J. Watson and some others, and served the St. Patrick Steam Packet Company, an element of the St. George Steam Packet Company which served the Dublin-Liverpool route, although the St. Patrick herself also stopped at Bristol. The company was in fierce rivalry with the War Office Steam Packet Company, particularly against their PS Hibernia. The St. Patrick "did not carry troops for the War Office, nor was she out for more than a night" indicating her speed and mail contract meant she was considered supreme. Furthermore, the Hibernia was 'a bit of a flop' (Farr 4), though it was likely just out of bad luck rather than poor design.

St. Patrick commenced service in May 1822, captained by J.P. Phillips, and arrived in Bristol on 10 May, and henceforth sailed the route Bristol-Dublin-Liverpool-Bristol, but also stopping at Tenby. The route took around 9/10 days to complete. The St. Patrick was a speedy packet ferry, doing Dublin-Bristol in 23.5 hours (an average of 9.3 knots, 17.2 km/h, 10.7 mph) in August 1822, and doing it in 23 hours (9.5 kn, 17.6 km/h, 10.9 mph) the next month. On 19 August, she began a Cork-Bristol service to compete with the War Office SPC, and continued this route until September 1823 when she returned to the old route as it was more profitable. On 27 June 1823, she got in a collision with the Hibernia and another ship called the Emerald Isle. The Emerald Isle suffered a crushed passenger, and lost rails, bulwarks, waterways and 30 ft (9.1 m) of her starboard planking, while the St. Patrick lost part of her head and cutwater. When she was sold in 1824, another St. Patrick was built in Liverpool to replace it. Later, because of the loss of that second St. Patrick near Waterford, a third St Patrick was built at Liverpool in 1833 to replace that one.

=== Portuguese service ===
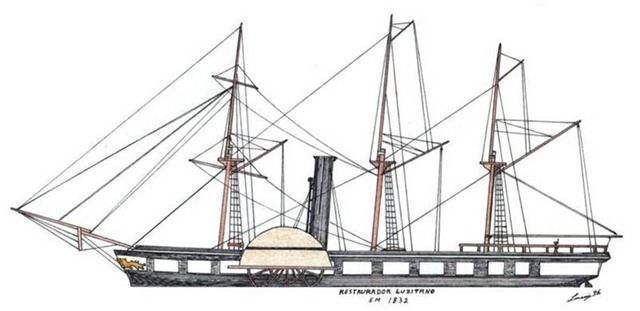
1832 drawing of the SS Restaurador Lusitano

Antonio Julia da Costa, the owner of the Portuguese shipping company Joao Baptista Angelo da Costa and Co., had recently lost his steamship Paquete Lusitano (which provided the Lisbon–Porto route) and so arranged to purchase a replacement steamer from Liverpool. The two-year-old St. Patrick was sold to his company and ran the route of the lost steamer. She was renamed Restaurador Lusitano (sometimes written as Luzitano), which meant "restored Lusitano"- or, in other words, 'replacement for the earlier ship Paquete Lusitano'. She left on her maiden voyage as the Restaurador Lusitano on 1/2 March and called at Lisbon to pick up 30 passengers, then arrived at Porto around a day later. On her second voyage, she sailed Porto–Belém in just 17 hours (an average of 11 knots, 20 km/h, 13 mph). However on two occasions, in bad weather, she sailed the route in 40 and 43 hours. In her first 8 months, she carried over 4,000 passengers. Disappointingly, she was described by a traveller in 1827 as poor- her engines were not very powerful and supposedly only doing 2 knots (3.7 km/h; 2.3 mph) when sailing against the wind, which meant she took twice as long as the advertised 24 hours to travel the route. In summer 1828, she briefly returned to Liverpool for repairs. Later that year, civil war broke out in Portugal. In 1832, due to a siege in Porto, the Restaurador Lusitano was unable to continue her passenger service and was chartered to the Absolutionists.

=== Final voyage ===
The Restaurador Lusitano left Lisbon in September 1832 bound for north Portugal loaded with siege guns and troops. In stormy weather, one of the warships, the brig Audaz lost her forward topmast and the steamer was commissioned to tow her. However, the strain of the warship almost pulled off her entire stern, causing many leaks which caused her to sink there on 11 September, off Aveiro before the enemy fleet, which did not attack. 189 artillerymen and 19 crew were lost, despite the efforts of a nearby frigate to save some men. Her wreck's approximate position is at 40°38′N 8°52′W.

== Sources ==
- Dawson, Charles (June 2000). Shephard, John (ed.). "Three Early Steamers" (PDF). The Bulletin. Vol. 44, no. 1. The Liverpool Nautical Research Society. Archived from the original (PDF) on 30 January 2022.
- Kennedy, John (1903). The History of Steam Navigation (PDF). Liverpool.
- "Portuguese Shipwrekcs – Restaurador Lusitano". liverpool.ac.uk.
- Sea Breezes, Volume 3, (Liverpool, 1947), Public Record Office, Kew Gardens, London, Transcripts & Transactions, BT 107/129 Liverpool 1822/33 Grahame Farr, West Country Passenger Steamers (Prescot, 1967), 12. Farr recounts the riposte from the competitor and a new attack on page 29. Farr,29 Farr, 13
