= Diocese of Nnewi =

Roman Catholic diocese in Nigeria

Diocese of Nnewi Dioecesis Nneviensis

Location
- Country: Nigeria
- Territory: northern portion of Anambra State including these local government areas: Nnewi North and Nnewi South, Ekwusigo and Ihiala (minus Uli and Amorka)
- Ecclesiastical province: Onitsha
- Metropolitan: Onitsha
- Coordinates: 6°01′11″N 6°54′53″E

Statistics
- Area: 1,160 km^{2} (450 sq mi)
- Population: Total; Catholics: (as of 2022); 1,080,350; 554,021 (51.3%)
- Parishes: 121

Information
- Denomination: Roman Catholic
- Rite: Roman Rite
- Established: 28 November 2001
- Cathedral: Cathedral of Our Lady of Assumption, Nnewi
- Secular priests: 299

Current leadership
- Pope: Leo XIV
- Bishop: Most Rev. Jonas Benson Okoye
- Metropolitan Archbishop: Valerian Okeke

Map
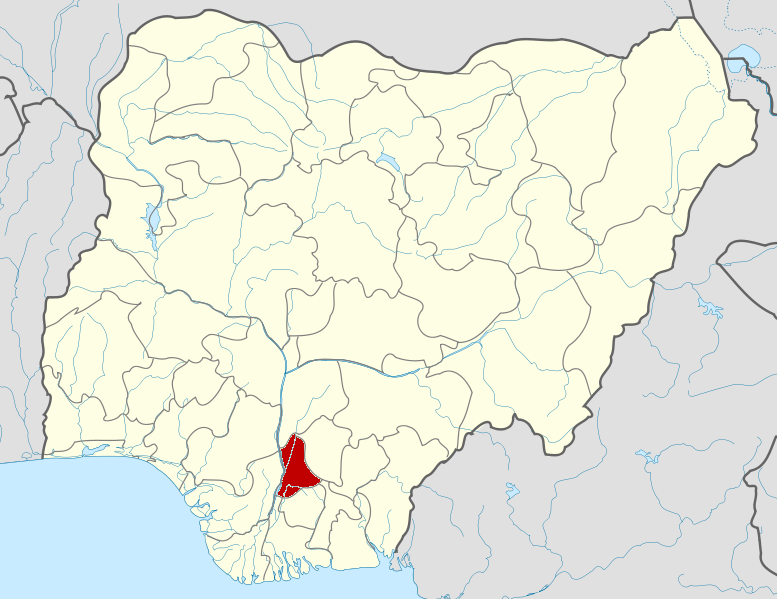
- The diocese as seen in the red part of the map

Website
- www.nnewicathdiocese.org

The Roman Catholic Diocese of Nnewi (Latin: Nnevien(sis)) is a diocese in Nnewi, Anambra State, Nigeria. It is under the ecclesiastical province of Onitsha.

== History ==
- November 28, 2001: Established as Diocese of Nnewi from the Metropolitan Archdiocese of Onitsha

== Special churches ==
The Cathedral is Cathedral of Our Lady of Assumption in Nnewi.

== Bishops ==
- Bishops of Nnewi Bishop(Roman rite)
  - Current Bishop Jonas Benson Okoye (since February 2022)
  - Bishop Emeritus Hilary Paul Odili Okeke (since November 9, 2001)

=== Other priest of this diocese who became bishop ===
- Jude Thaddeus Okolo, appointed nuncio and titular archbishop in 2008

== See also ==
- Roman Catholicism in Nigeria

== Sources ==
- GCatholic.org Information
- Catholic Hierarchy
