= Partick (disambiguation) =

Partick is an area in Glasgow.

Partick may also refer to:

- Partick (UK Parliament constituency)
- Partick station
- Partick F.C. (1875), a historical football club
- Glasgow Partick (UK Parliament constituency)

== See also ==
- Partick Thistle F.C., professional football club
- Partick Thistle W.F.C., women's football club
- Partick Castle
- Partick Central railway station
- Patrick (disambiguation)
