= St. Patrick's Church =

St. Patrick's Church, Saint Patrick's Church, St. Patrick's Roman Catholic Church or Saint Patrick's Roman Catholic Church, and similar, may refer to:

== Australia ==
- St Patrick's Church, Adelaide, a heritage-listed church in Adelaide, South Australia
- St Patrick's Catholic Church, Brandon, a heritage-listed former church in Shire of Burdekin, Queensland
- St Patricks Church, Fortitude Valley, a heritage-listed church in Brisbane, Queensland
- St Patrick's Church, Gympie
- St Patrick's Church, Mount Perry, a heritage-listed church in the North Burnett Region, Queensland
- St Patrick's Church, Rosevale, a heritage-listed church in the Scenic Rim Region, Queensland
- St Patrick's Church, The Rocks, Sydney
- St Patrick's Catholic Church, York, Western Australia
- St. Patrick's Catholic Church, Yungaburra, a heritage-listed church in the Tablelands Region, Queensland

== Canada ==
- St. Patrick's Roman Catholic Church (Calgary), Alberta
- St. Patrick's Church (Carbonear), Newfoundland and Labrador
- St. Patrick's Church, St John's, Newfoundland and Labrador
- St. Patrick's Church, Halifax, a heritage-listed church in Nova Scotia
- St. Patrick's Church (Toronto), Ontario
- St. Patrick's Church (Quebec City), Quebec
- St. Patrick's Basilica, Montreal, Quebec

== Grenada ==
- St. Patrick's Church, Carriacou

== India ==
- St. Patrick Church, Siddakatte, Karnataka

== Ireland ==
=== County Dublin ===
- St. Patrick's Church, Ringsend

=== County Louth ===
- St. Patrick's Church, Dundalk

=== County Waterford ===
- St Patrick's Catholic Church, Waterford

=== County Kildare ===
- St. Patrick's Church, Straffan

== Isle of Man ==
- St. Patrick's Church, Jurby

== Montserrat ==
- St. Patrick's Church, Lookout

== United Kingdom ==
- St Patrick's Church, Bolton, Greater Manchester
- St Patrick's Church, Bradford, West Yorkshire
- St Patrick's Church, Hove, East Sussex
- St Patrick's Church, Huddersfield, West Yorkshire
- St Patrick's Church, Leeds, West Yorkshire
- St Patrick's Catholic Church, Leicester, Leicestershire
- St Patrick's Church, Liverpool, Merseyside
- St Patrick's Church, Newport, Wales
- Our Lady of Mount Carmel and St Patrick Church, Oldham, Greater Manchester
- St Patrick's Church, Patrington, East Yorkshire
- St Patrick's Church, Preston Patrick, Cumbria
- St Patrick's Church, Salter Street, Earlswood, West Midlands (on Warwickshire border)
- St Patrick's Church, Soho Square, London
- St Patrick's Church, Waterloo, London

== United States ==
- St. Patrick's Catholic Church (Loxley, Alabama)
- St. Patrick's Roman Catholic Church (Bisbee, Arizona)
- St. Patrick Catholic Church (Los Angeles), California
- St. Patrick's Catholic Church, San Francisco, California
- St. Patrick Mission Church (Denver, Colorado)
- St. Patrick's Church (Bridgeport, Connecticut)
- St. Patrick Catholic Church (Miami Beach), Florida
- Saint Patrick Catholic Church, Tampa, Florida
- Saint Patrick Catholic Church, Honolulu, Hawaii
- Old St. Patrick's Church (Chicago), Illinois
- St. Patrick's Roman Catholic Church (Lagro, Indiana)
- St. Patrick's Catholic Church, Cedar, Iowa
- St. Patrick's Church (Cumming, Iowa)
- Saint Patrick's Church (Dubuque, Iowa)
- St. Patrick's Church-Garryowen, Iowa
- St. Patrick's Catholic Church (Georgetown, Iowa)
- St. Patrick Church (Imogene, Iowa)
- Saint Patrick's Church (Iowa City, Iowa)
- St. Patrick's Catholic Church (Perry, Iowa)
- St. Patrick's Catholic Church (Atchison, Kansas)
- St. Patrick's Catholic Church (Louisville, Kentucky)
- St. Patrick's Church (New Orleans), Louisiana
- St. Patrick's Catholic Church (West Pointe à la Hache, Louisiana)
- St. Patrick's Catholic Church (Newcastle, Maine)
- St. Patrick's Church (Fall River, Massachusetts)
- St. Patrick's Church (Lowell, Massachusetts)
- St. Patrick's Parish Complex (Ann Arbor, Michigan)
- Chapel of St. Theresa-the Little Flower (Detroit, Michigan) (known as St. Patrick Church)
- St. Patrick's Catholic Church (Meridian, Mississippi)
- Old St. Patrick's Church (Gravois Mills, Missouri)
- St. Patrick's Co-Cathedral (Billings, Montana)
- St. Patrick's Parish and Buildings (Jersey City, New Jersey)
- St. Patrick's Parochial Residence-Convent and School (Elmira, New York)
- St. Patrick's Cathedral (Manhattan), New York
- St. Patrick's Church (Staten Island, New York)
- St. Patrick's Church (Syracuse, New York)
- St. Pius X Catholic Church (Cincinnati, Ohio), (formerly St. Patrick's Church)
- Saint Patrick Church (Columbus, Ohio)
- St. Patrick's Catholic Church (Glynwood, Ohio)
- St. Patrick's Catholic Church and School, (Kent, Ohio)
- St. Patrick's Catholic Church (St. Patrick, Ohio)
- St. Patrick's Catholic Church (Toledo, Ohio)
- St. Patrick's Catholic Church (Wellington, Ohio), listed on the NRHP as Old St. Patrick's Church
- Saint Patrick's Roman Catholic Church (Independence, Oregon)
- St. Patrick Catholic Church (Portland, Oregon)
- St. Patrick's Roman Catholic Church (Cowansville, Pennsylvania)
- St. Patrick's Catholic Church and Rectory (Nashville, Tennessee)
- St. Patrick's Catholic Church (Washington, D.C.)
- St. Patrick's Episcopal Church (Washington, D.C.)
- St. Patrick's Roman Catholic Church (Adell, Wisconsin)
- Saint Patrick's Church (Benton, Wisconsin)
- St. Patrick's Church (Eau Claire, Wisconsin)
- St. Patrick's Roman Catholic Church (Madison, Wisconsin)
- St. Patrick's Roman Catholic Church (Milwaukee, Wisconsin)
- St. Patrick's Roman Catholic Church (Racine, Wisconsin)

== See also ==
- St. Patrick's Cathedral (disambiguation), including St. Patrick's Basilica
- Iglesia San Patricio
