= Yellowknife Catholic School Board =

Catholic school board in the Northwest Territories, Canada

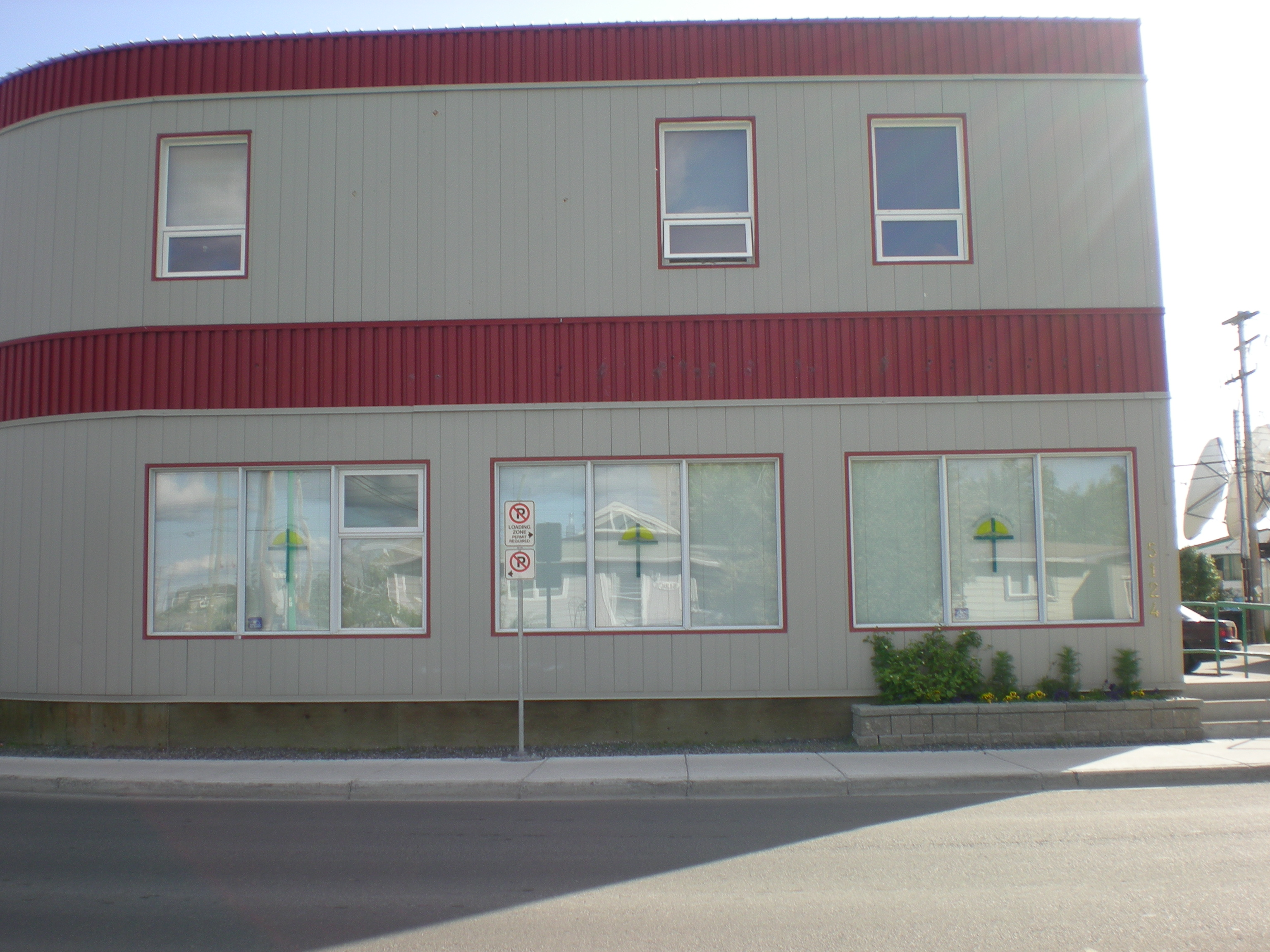
- Yellowknife Catholic School Board office

Address
- 5124 49 Street Yellowknife, Northwest Territories, X1A 2P4; Canada
- Coordinates: 62°27′08″N 114°21′56″W

District information
- Motto: Where Learning Lights the Spirit
- Superintendent: Simone Gessler
- Asst. superintendent(s): Patrick Sullivan; Mahesh Adhikary
- Chair of the board: Tina Schauerte
- Schools: 3
- Budget: CA$n/a million

Students and staff
- Students: 1,500 (approx.)
- Staff: 250 (approx.)

Other information
- Board members: Susan Waddell; Christine Lewandowski; Steven Voytilla; Gerri Whiteford; Melanie Williams
- Website: www.ycs.nt.ca

The Yellowknife Catholic School Board is the religious school board responsible for Catholic schools in Yellowknife, Northwest Territories, Canada. The board is made up of a chair and five other elected members.

== Yellowknife Catholic Schools ==
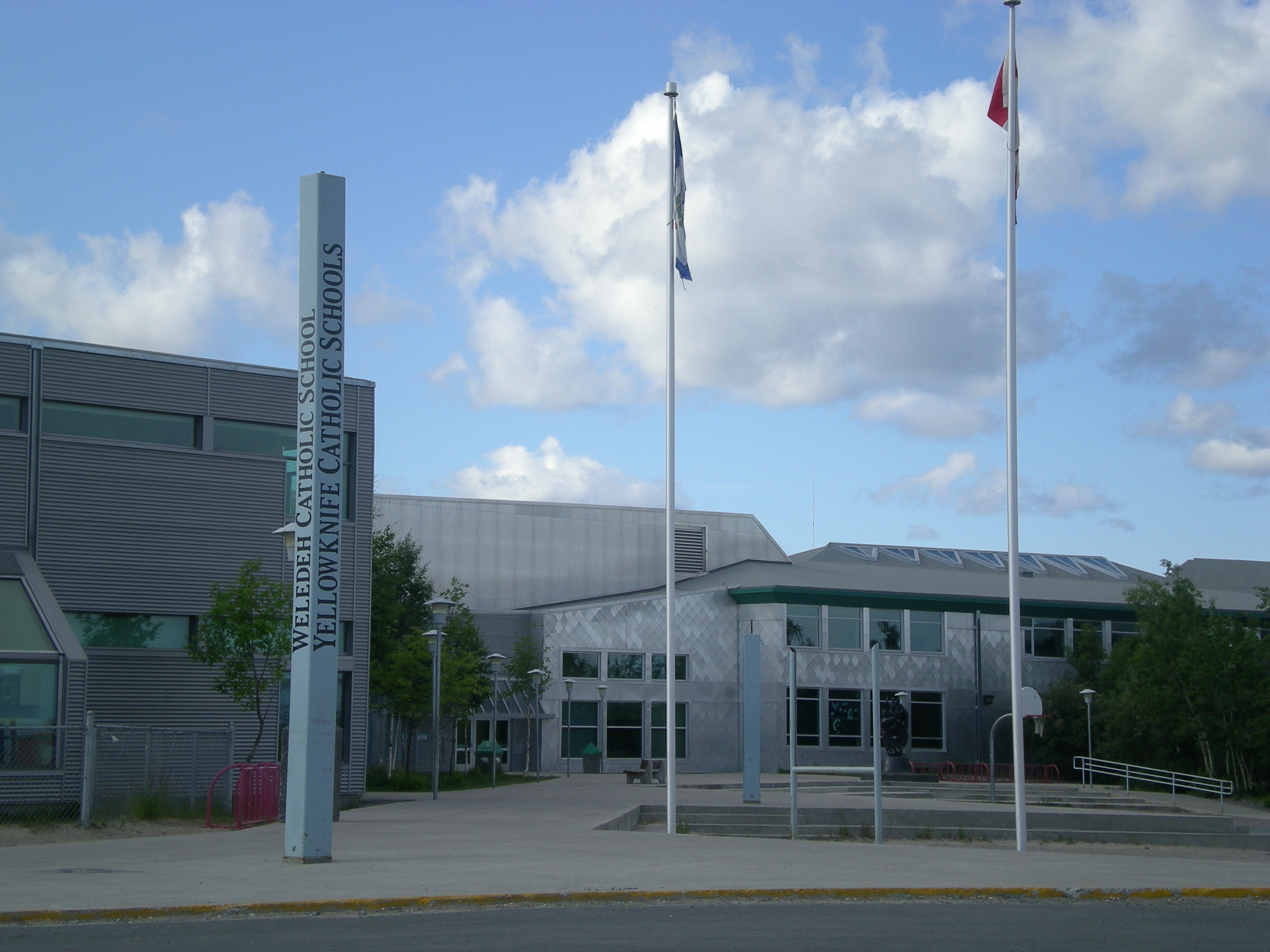
Weledeh Catholic School^{map 1}

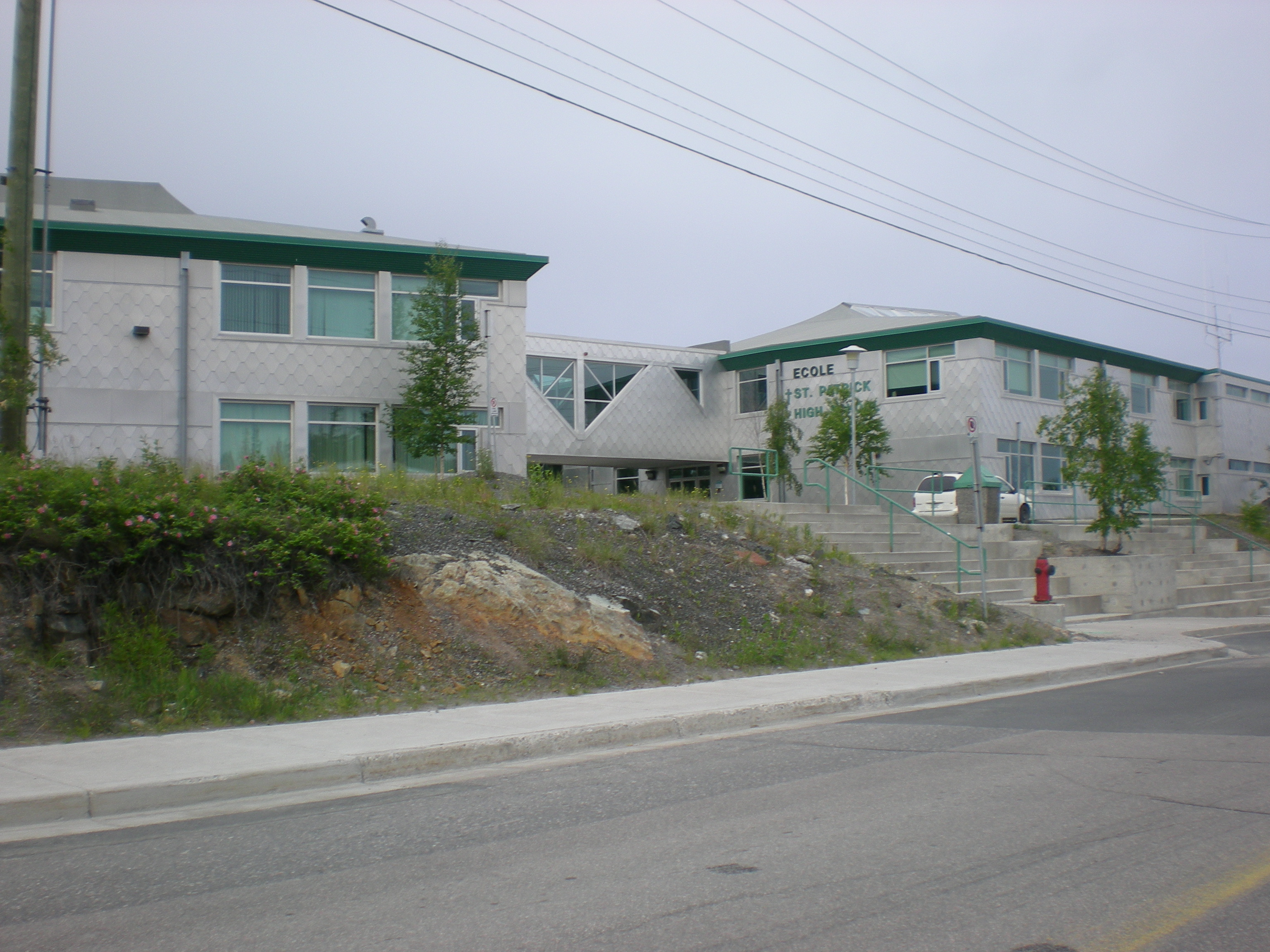
École St. Patrick High School^{map 2}

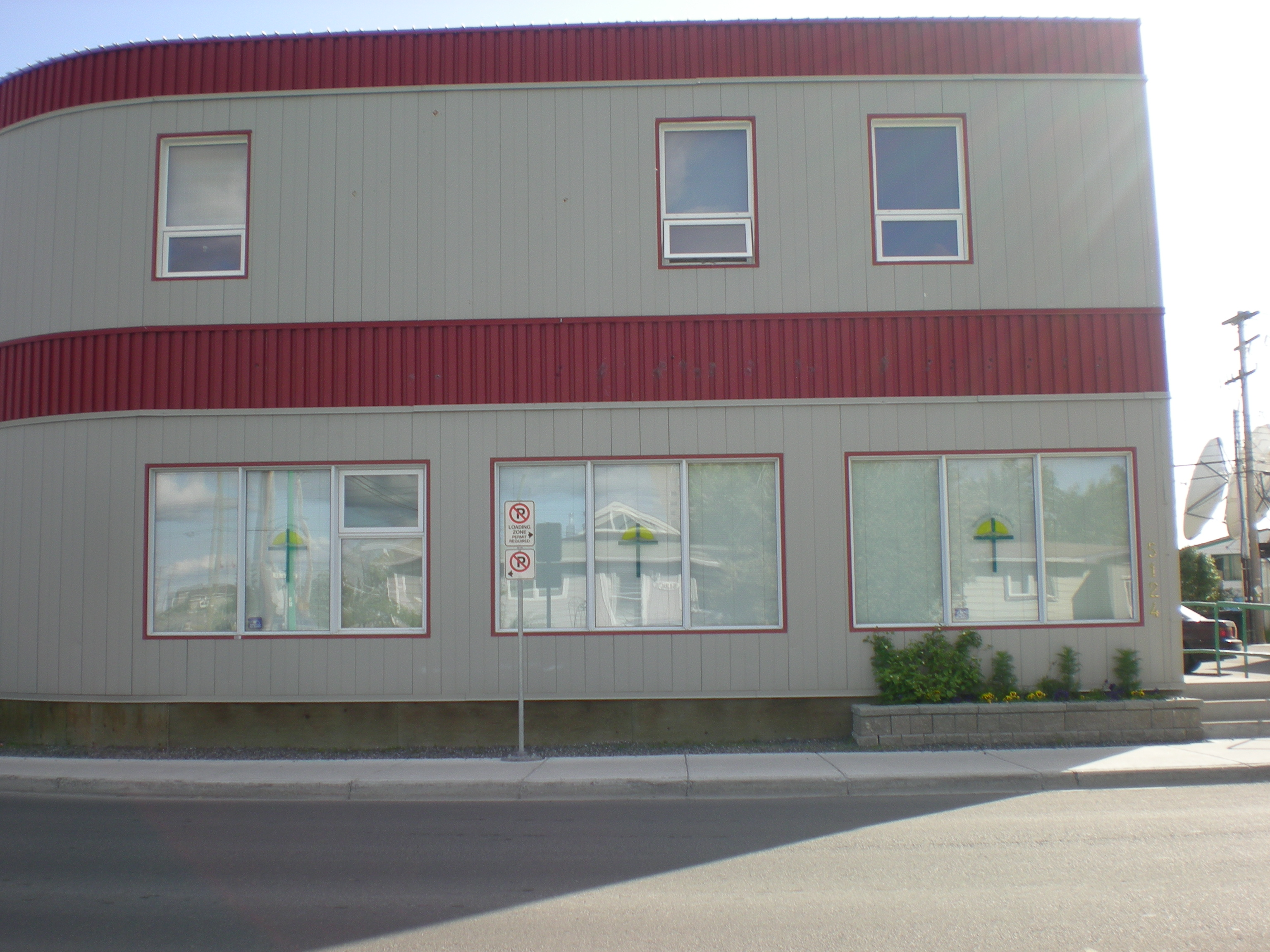
Board office^{map 3}

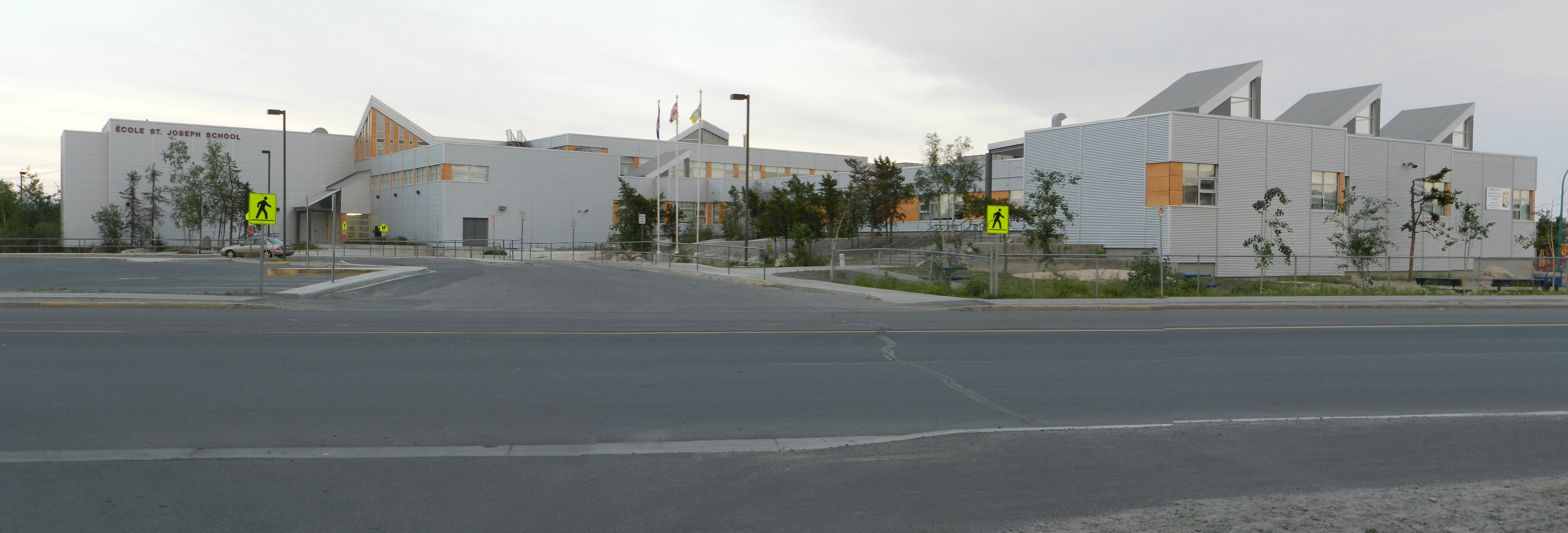
École St. Joseph School^{map 4}

== List of schools ==
| School> | Grades | Principal | Staff | Students | Notes & references |
|---|---|---|---|---|---|
| École St. Joseph School | JK – 7 | Paul Kelly | 48 | | |
| École St. Patrick High School | 8 – 12 | Don Reid | 56 | | Includes the Kimberlite Career & Technical Centre^{map 5} |
| Weledeh Catholic School | JK – 7 | Alicia Larade | 68 | | |

== See also ==
- List of schools in the Northwest Territories
- Education in Canada

== Mapping ==
- Weledeh Catholic School, 62°27′19″N 114°21′53″W
- St. Patrick High School, 62°27′23″N 114°21′47″W
- Yellowknife Catholic School Board, 62°27′11″N 114°22′01″W
- École St. Joseph School, 62°26′37″N 114°24′38″W
- Kimberlite Career & Technical Centre, 62°27′24″N 114°21′46″W
