= RMS St. Patrick (1825) =

Irish steam packet ferry

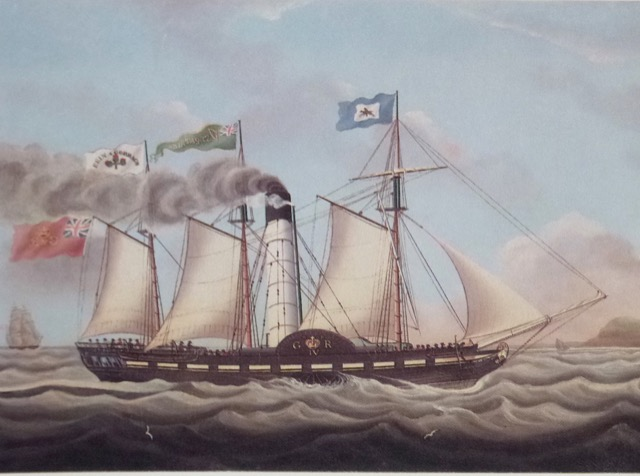
- RMS St Patrick arriving in Cork (1827)

History

United Kingdom
- Name: RMS St Patrick
- Namesake: Saint Patrick
- Owner: St George Steam Packet Company
- Route: Cork-Waterford
- Ordered: 1825
- Builder: Clarke and Nicholson, Liverpool (Main ship), Fawcett & Preston, Liverpool (Engines)
- Launched: 19 August 1825
- Completed: 1825
- Out of service: 24 November 1831
- Fate: Struck sand bank at Boyce's Bay 24 November 1831

General characteristics
- Tons burthen: 203/300
- Length: 130 ft (40 m)
- Beam: 22 ft (6.7 m)
- Propulsion: Paddle wheels; 120 hp (89 kW) engines; Three masts

The second RMS St. Patrick was a steam packet ferry of the St George Steam Packet Company which served entirely in Ireland, running from Cork to Waterford. She was ordered in 1825 following the selling of the first St. Patrick the previous year. She continued serving the company until 1831, when she grounded with no loss of life. She was launched on 19 August 1825 in Liverpool with a tonnage of 203 or 300 depending on the source (mentioned in infobox). She measured 130 ft (40 m) in length by 22 ft (6.7 m)

== Loss ==
On 24 November 1831, the St. Patrick grounded on a sand bar in thick fog off Hook Tower in Waterford at the end of her voyage. There were no casualties, and she was not commanded by her normal captain on her fateful voyage. An unnamed newspaper said:

"Information was received in this city on Monday, of the loss of the St. Patrick steamer (late of Bristol), on Friday evening last [24 November 1831], about six o'clock, off the Hook Tower, Waterford, in a dense fog. Her bottom is said to be beat out. The crew and passengers were saved. She was bound from Cork to Waterford, and it was intended to put her on the line from the latter port to Liverpool. Her usual Captain (Goff) was not on board at the time of the accident."

Following the disaster, the wreck was not refloated or even salvaged, but a new ship by the same name was ordered. Divers in 1989 reported finding pieces of brass on the seabed in 9 ft (2.7 m)-12 ft (3.7 m) of water around 52°9' N, 6°55' W. Although this is close to where the vessel is reported to have sunk, many ships have also been lost in that area. Her replacement RMS St. Patrick also sank nearby seven years later.
