= St. Patrick's Cathedral, Awka =

Roman Catholic church in Awka

Coordinates: 6°13′21″N 7°04′22″E

St. Patrick's Cathedral
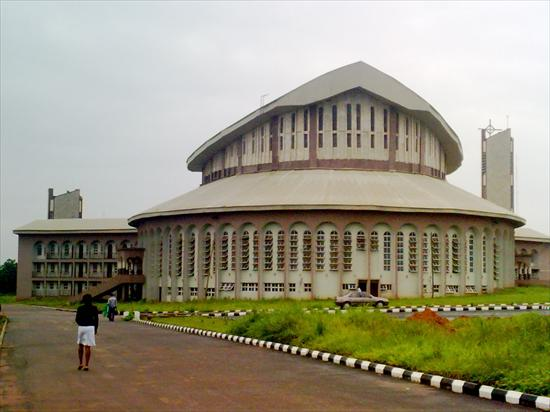
- View of the cathedral from entrance gate
- St. Patrick's Cathedral
- Location: Awka, Anambra State
- Country: Nigeria
- Denomination: Catholic Church
- Tradition: Latin Church

History
- Status: Cathedral
- Dedication: Saint Patrick

Architecture
- Functional status: Active
- Architectural type: Church

Administration
- Diocese: Awka

Clergy
- Bishop: Paulinus Ezeokafor

St. Patrick's Cathedral is a Roman Catholic church located in Awka in Anambra State, Nigeria. The cathedral is dedicated to Saint Patrick, and is the seat of the bishop of Awka.

The cathedral is part of St. Patrick's Cathedral Church which was created in 1954.
