= St. Patrick's Church, Ringsend =

Roman catholic church in Dublin, Ireland

St. Patrick's Church
- St. Patrick's Church, Ringsend
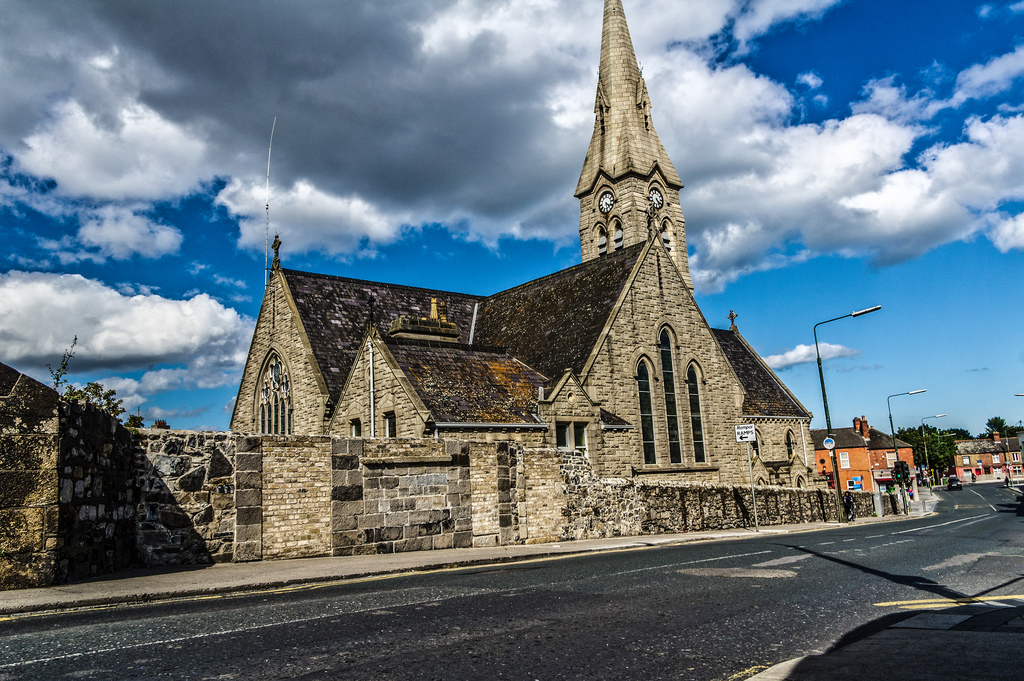
- St. Patrick's Church
- 53.34189°N 6.22814°W
- Location: Ringsend; County Dublin
- Country: Ireland
- Denomination: Roman Catholic
- Website: stpatrickschurchringsend.com/

History
- Dedication: Saint Patrick

Architecture
- Architect: William Henry Byrne; Ralph Henry Byrne
- Architectural type: Gothic Revival

Administration
- Archdiocese: Dublin
- Deanery: Donnybrook
- Parish: Ringsend

St. Patrick's Church is a Roman Catholic church in Ringsend, Dublin.

The church was designed by W.H. Byrne and Son in a Gothic revival style which was common for Roman Catholic churches of the period in Ireland.

The foundation stone was laid by the Archbishop of Dublin on 29 October 1911. The contractor was William Conolly & Sons of Dominick Street, Dublin.
