= RMS St. Patrick (1833) =

History

United Kingdom
- Name: RMS St. Patrick
- Owner: St George Steam Packet Company
- Port of registry: Liverpool
- Route: Liverpool-Waterford
- Builder: Humble, Hurry & Milcrest, Liverpool, Sir John Tobin
- Launched: 1833
- Out of service: Sold to Waterford Steam Packet Company in 1836
- Fate: Struck rocks north of Hook Tower during storm 28th November 1838. 6 lost, 23 saved. Approximate position 52° 8' N, 6° 56' W.

General characteristics
- Tons burthen: 269
- Length: 149 ft (45 m)
- Beam: 29 ft (8.8 m)
- Propulsion: Paddle wheels

The third RMS St. Patrick was a steam packet ferry ordered by the St George Steam Packet Company after the loss of the second one and was registered B129 by her builders in Liverpool. Not much is known about her service life, but her sinking is a dramatic one. She was sold to Waterford Steam Packet Company in 1836. Research is currently being done from newspaper archives to compile the full sinking article with as much accuracy as is possible.

== Loss ==
The St. Patrick departed from Liverpool at 6/7 am on Tuesday, 27 November 1838 loaded with her usual load of cargo and at least 29 passengers. As she progressed on her journey, she braced the winds of a near-hurricane that had been blowing S.S.W. for about a week.

At half-past one, her entire fore-gaff was ripped away by the wind. The storm kept going through the night, and at 1 am she took on water via her hatches, settling her down a little. This was not a serious concern, however, as steamers like these often faced serious damage during rough seas.

At 4:30, the Tuskar light was spotted and estimated to be around 4 miles away. She then steered west-half-north until 8 am, when she was hauled to and headed westward. Around that time, a brig, which was suffering the storm just as much as her, passed, but the St. Patrick was unable to help. She then lay to until 12:30, still battling the heavy gale and thick rain.

Afterwards, she bore away for the final stretch to Waterford harbour. The carpenter was working hard on securing the crank hatches as the ship further struggled with the storm and took on considerable water. At 2:30pm, the foresail was destroyed by a large wave, while there was still no land in sight, and the ship hauled to under the mainsail on starboard. The sea was measured to be 15 fathoms (27 m; 90 ft) deep at this time.

At 3pm, a heavy wave struck behind the starboard paddle box, taking out the starboard lifeboat, part of her bulwarks, her binnacle, some of her railing, and the main hatches were caved in. 5 seamen were injured and the carpenter was then put to work securing the destroyed hatches with tarps.

At 3:20, another squall took the galley and main winch and poured down the broken hatches, which caused her to settle down by the stern. The clouds began to part at 4:10pm, and the crew spotted Hook Light 4 miles away at N.N.W., to which they took the mainsail in and bore away. Soon afterwards, the aftcastle was washed over, taking out the helm, skylights, companionway, first mate John Tucket and seaman Rowley Tone; the relieving tackles were immediately hooked on in a desperate attempt to keep control, which proved effective as the vessel answered very well. At 5pm, the hook of the portside tackle broke and second mate William Trace/Trail was carried away. Now completely out of control, she was carried into the rocks of Hook Point, near the small village of Churchtown, which she struck at 5:10 pm.

The main gangway was broken in and the hull began to rapidly flood, and the passengers and crew were assembled on the forecastle, where they were able to drop onto the rock from the bowsprit. One of the passengers, Mr. Fitzgerald, got off safely, but climbed back aboard to look for his missing wife. He found her successfully, but just then the ship broke in two abaft of the paddles, and they were both drowned. The couple were born in the nearby town Tipperary, but had been living in America for the past 3 years, and had presumably taken a ship across the Atlantic to Liverpool, where they boarded the St. Patrick in hopes to return home; alas they met their fate together.

Captain Schutz notably broke his arm during his escape. When the tide went out, the survivors were able to be rescued by the locals of Churchtown, in particular a Mr. King and another known only as "Power", gave up their beds and food for the survivors. In the words of the Waterford Mirror, 1st Dec 1838, We have to mention the kind, hospitable treatment received from the poor inhabitants of the place, especially one of the name of Power, who gave up their beds for our use, and their scanty supply of provisions, Capt. Dickens of the Fort of Duncannon, the Rev Mr. Lowe, Chaplain of the Fort, and the Rev Charles William Doyne, of Feathard, were most attentive to the Captain and shipwrecked seamen, supplying them with money and necessaries of life, for which they desire to record their lively and grateful remembrance.

Her wreck continued to be destroyed to the point that "not a plank remained". The loss was estimated at £24,000.
