= Peter University, Achina-Onneh =

Private university in Nigeria

Coordinates: 5.996°N 7.143°E

Peter University, Achina/Onneh
- Motto: Ut Omnes Excellant
- Motto in English: That all May Excel
- Type: Private university
- Established: 2020
- Founders: Catholic Dioceses of Awka and Ekwuluobia
- Accreditation: 2020
- Affiliations: ICAN
- Religious affiliation: Catholic church
- Vice-Chancellor: Fr Prof. Chukwuemenam Umezinwa
- Location: Achina and Onneh, Anambra, Nigeria
- Campus: Suburban
- Website: https://www.puni.edu.ng/

Peter University, Achina/Onneh is a private university in Nigeria. It is an approved university by the Federal Government of Nigeria and owned by the Catholic Dioceses of Awka and Ekwulobia. It is located in Achina and Onneh towns of Aguata and Orumba local government areas, respectively in Anambra State, Nigeria.

== Accreditation ==
On May 12, 2022, the National Universities Commission (NUC) approved of 12 private universities in Nigeria. Peter University was one of them. The institution is in affiliation with ICAN.

== Matriculation ==
In 2024, Peter University had its maiden matriculation ceremony with about two hundred fresh students.
