= École St. Patrick High School =

École St. Patrick High School St. Pat's
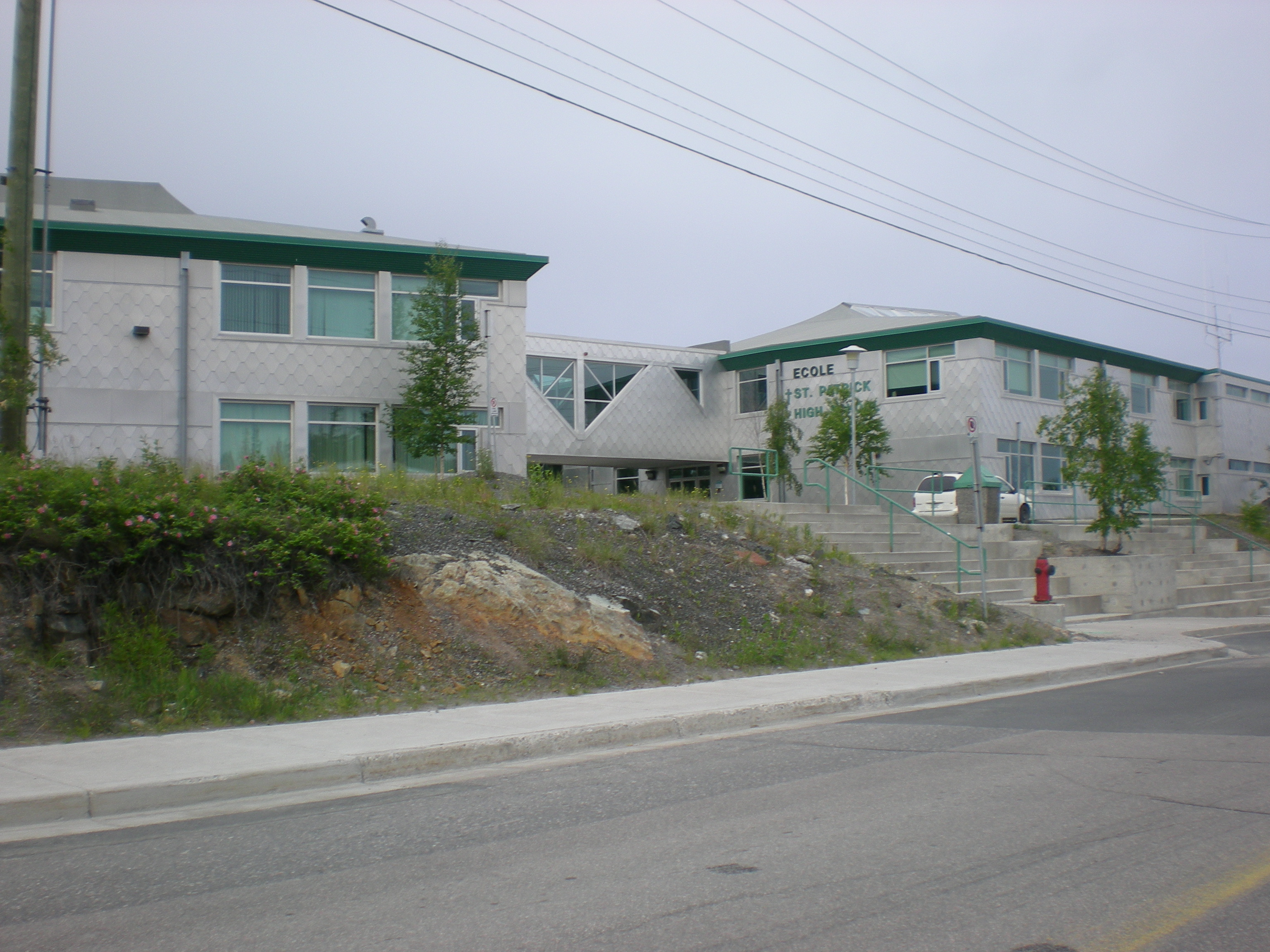

Location
- Box 2880, 5010 - 44 Street; Yellowknife, Northwest Territories, X1A 2R2; Canada
- Coordinates: 62°27′23″N 114°21′47″W

Information
- School type: High school
- Motto: Let Your Light Shine
- Religious affiliation: Catholic
- Established: 1961
- School board: Yellowknife Catholic School Board
- School district: YCS
- Area trustee: Tina Schauerte, Susan Waddell, Christine Lewandowski, Todd Slack, Steven Voytilla, Gerri Whiteford, Melanie Williams
- Principal: Todd Stewart
- Grades: 8-12
- Language: English, French immersion
- Colours: Green and White
- Mascot: Shammy
- Team name: Irish
- Website: www.esphs.nt.ca

École St. Patrick High School is a Catholic school in Yellowknife, Northwest Territories, Canada. It is operated by the Yellowknife Catholic School Board (YCS).

The Catholic School system was established with the erection of the first K-12 school in 1953. In 1961, a separate Catholic High School called St. Patrick High was completed. St Patrick High School burned down in 1964 but was quickly rebuilt. The two schools operated separately until 1967 when expansion of St. Patrick School allowed all grades within the same building. In the 1990s, the current St. Patrick High School was completed. The original school was demolished in 2000 and a separate elementary section was established and christened Weledeh Elementary School.

Along with English, St. Patrick's offers the French immersion program for students in grades 9–12.

== See also ==
- List of schools in the Northwest Territories
