= St. Patrick's School =

Saint Patrick School, Saint Patrick's School or St Patrick's School may refer to:

== Australia ==
- St Patrick's College, Ballarat, an independent Catholic boys school in the city of Ballarat, Victoria, Australia.

== Singapore ==
- Saint Patrick's School, Singapore

== United Kingdom ==
- St. Patrick's Grammar School, Armagh in Northern Ireland
- St Patrick's Catholic Primary School in Stafford, England

== United States ==
- St. Patrick's Episcopal Day School in Washington, D.C.
- Saint Patrick School (San Jose, California)
- St. Patrick Catholic School (Miami Beach, Florida)
- Saint Patrick School (Pelham, New Hampshire)
- Saint Patrick School (New Jersey) in Chatham, New Jersey
- St. Patrick High School (New Jersey) oldest in New Jersey (now closed)

== See also ==
- St. Patrick's High School (disambiguation)
- St. Patrick's College (disambiguation)
