= St. Patrick Catholic Church (Miami Beach) =

Church building in Florida, United States

Coordinates: 25.811483°N 80.13508°W

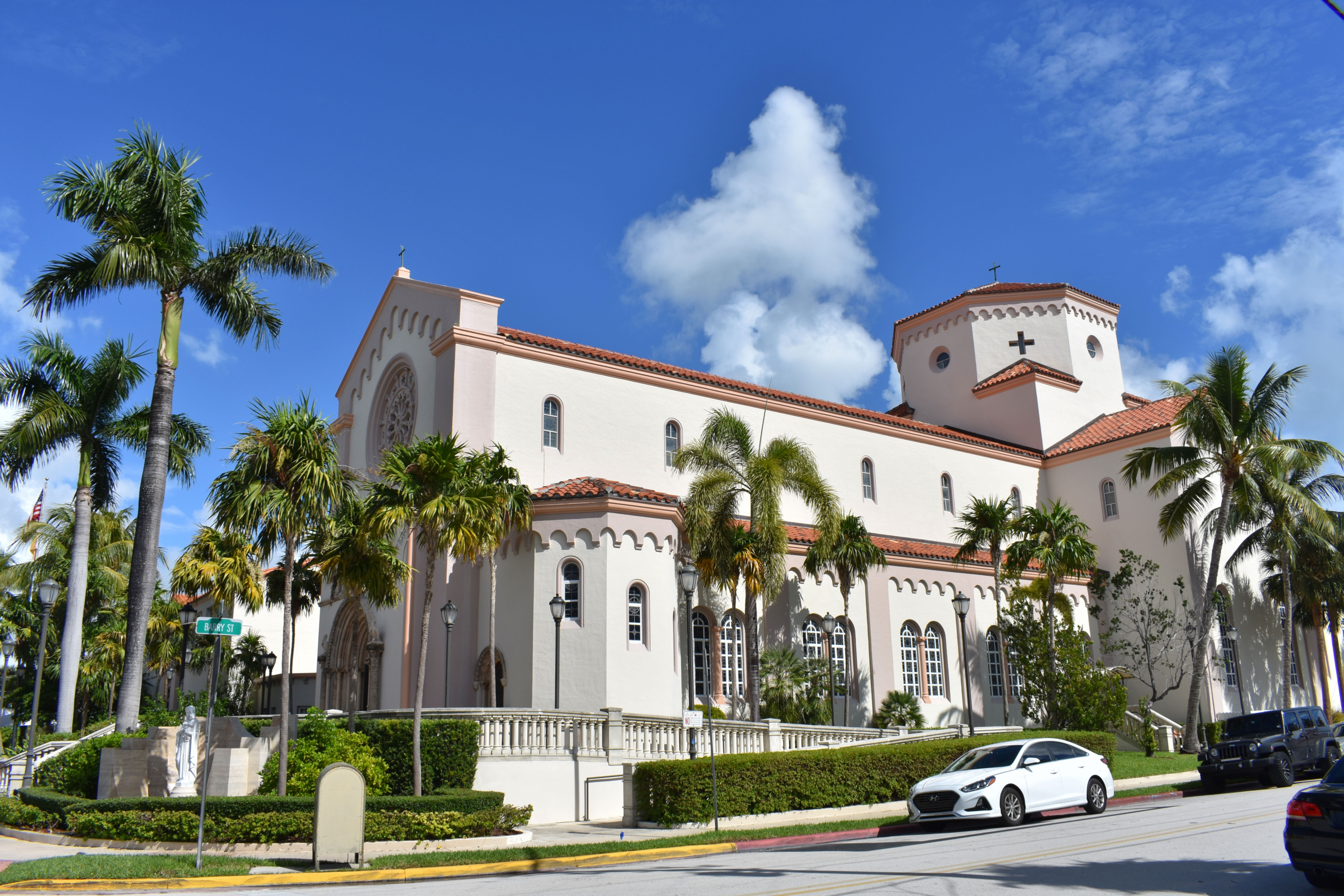
St. Patrick Catholic Church in Miami Beach

St. Patrick Catholic Church was the first Catholic parish on Miami Beach. The church is located at 3716 Garden Avenue, Miami Beach, Florida 33141. Father Roberto Cid is pastor.

== History ==
Father William Barry was born in Ireland and ordained a priest in the Cathedral of Baltimore for the Diocese of St. Augustine in June 1910. He was a pastor at four Churches and in May 1926 transferred to Miami Beach to found St. Patrick Church. He remained pastor until 1966 prior to his death in 1967.

The first mass was celebrated in Miami Beach Gardens theater on 41st Street and Alton Road on Sunday, May 13th, 1926.

Carl G. Fisher, a non-Catholic, donated five polo stables to Father Barry for use as a church and school for St. Patrick Parish. On June 2, 1926, the first mass was held in a refurbished stable.

After the September 17, 1926 hurricane, Father Barry and a committee of parishioners chose a site of twelve lots between 39th and 40th streets for a new church, rectory, convent, school, recreation hall, and auditorium.

On February 22, 1928, the cornerstone for the church was laid. The church was dedicated on February 3, 1929. The seating capacity is 700.

In 1942, Miami Beach became host to an OCS Army base. Local hotels and motels were taken over by hundreds of thousands of servicemen. Father Barry allowed the army to use all parish facilities.

== St. Patrick Catholic Church Pastors ==
- Rev. William Barry (1926-1966)
- Rev. Msgr. James J. Walsh (1966-1971)
- Rev. Rene H. Gracida (1971-1972)
- Rev. Joseph P. Cronin (1972-1981)
- Rev. James P. Murphy (1981-1996)
- Rev. Msgr. John Vaughan (1996-2012)
- Rev. Roberto Cid (2012-Present)
