= St. Patrick Catholic School (Miami Beach, Florida) =

St. Patrick School
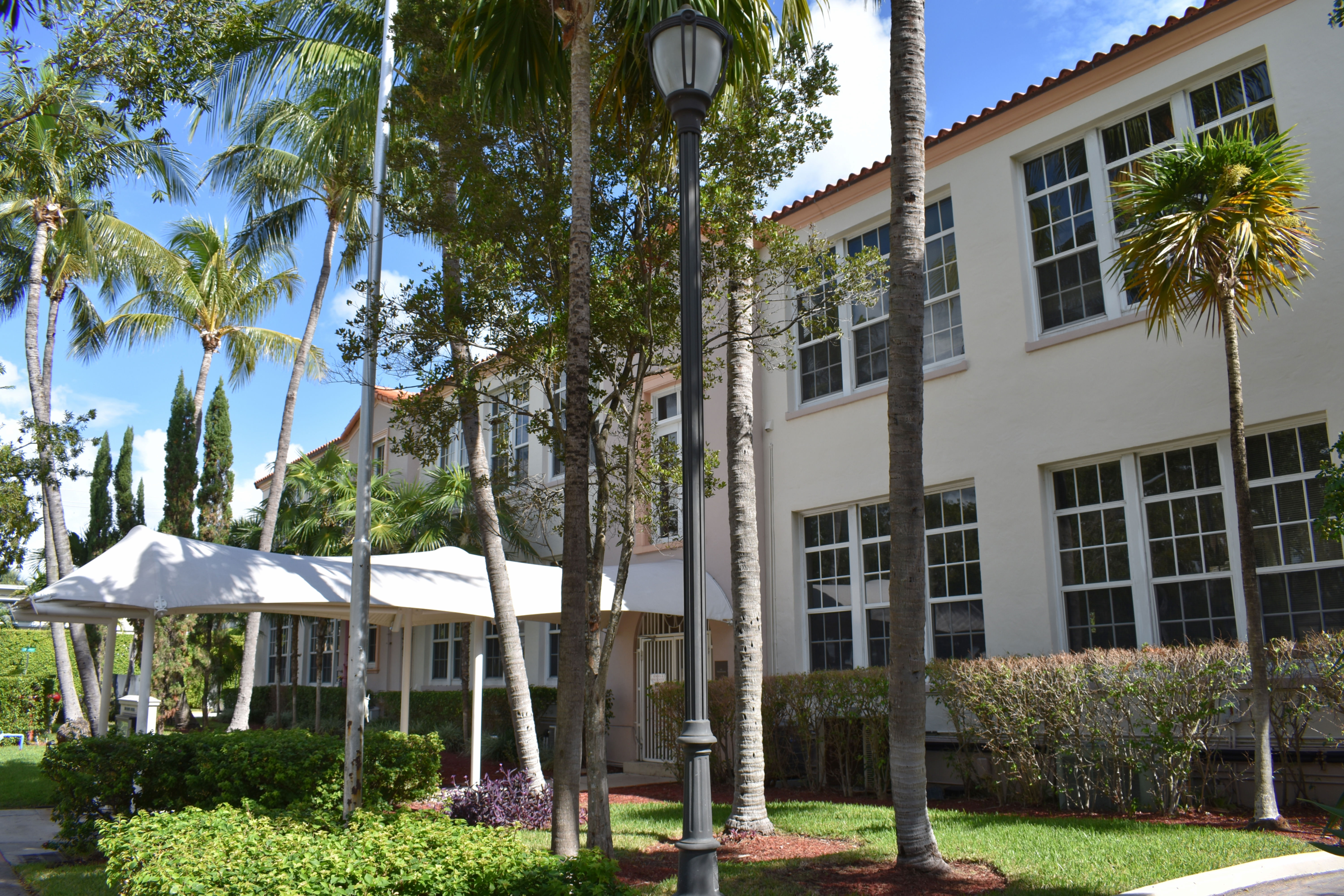

Location
- 3700 Garden Avenue; Miami Beach, Miami-Dade County, Florida 33140-3851; United States; 25.811425°N 80.135041°W

Information
- School type: Catholic school
- Religious affiliation: Christianity
- Denomination: Catholic Church
- Patron saint: Saint Patrick
- Established: 1926
- Status: Open
- NCES School ID: 00257078
- Principal: Bertha Moro
- Faculty: 23 (on an FTE basis)
- Grades: K-8
- Enrollment: 297 (2021-22)
  - Kindergarten: 30
  - Grade 1: 24
  - Grade 2: 23
  - Grade 3: 37
  - Grade 4: 41
  - Grade 5: 36
  - Grade 6: 38
  - Grade 7: 32
  - Grade 8: 36
- Student to teacher ratio: 12.9:1
- Hours in school day: 7.2
- Campus type: Small city
- School fees: $1095.00
- Annual tuition: $13,050.00
- Affiliation: NCEA
- Website: stpatrickmiamibeach.com/school/

St. Patrick Catholic School, also called St. Patrick Parish School, is a private Catholic school located at 3700 Garden Avenue, Miami Beach, Florida. It is the parish school for the St. Patrick Catholic Church.

== History ==
In 1926, Monsignor William Barry and five Adrian Dominican Sisters remodeled five polo stables that Carl G. Fisher had donated to the parish into five classrooms and a cafeteria.

Due to the damage caused by the 1926 Miami hurricane to the school buildings, the school did not open until two weeks after the hurricane had passed—also, only 20 of the 150 students registered before the hurricane attended on opening day.

In 1927, two more classrooms were added. There was only one high school graduate in the class of 1927, 1928, and 1929, and only three graduates in 1930.

A $75,000 building permit was issued on May 31, 1930, for St. Patrick Catholic Elementary and High School—the first of three units of the two-story school building, completed in 1932, opened in September.

Accreditation in the Southern Association of Colleges and Schools became a reality in 1933, along with the acceptance by Florida.

The last 12th grade graduation was in 1972, with 37 graduates. The school continues to provide education from Kindergarten to 8th grade.

In 1976, the school was first accredited by the Florida Catholic Conference. In 1988, it was named a "National School of Excellence" by the United States Department of Education. Bertha Moro is the school principal.

== Leadership ==
Below are lists of individuals who have led the school.

=== First Five Sisters at School (1926) ===
- Sister Miriam Fenner
- Sister Francis Margaret Grix
- Sister Jane Catherine Hauser
- Sister Blanche Kelly
- Sister Leo Clare Thornton

=== Principals ===
- Sister Blanche Kelly (1926–1930)
- Sister Leo Clare Thornton (1930–1936)
- Sister Ann Terence McClear (1936–1942)
- Sister Rose Ann McIntosh (1942–1946)
- Sister Mary Aurelia Gray (1946–1952) -- Grade School
- Sister Hildegarde Brennan (1946–1952) -- High School
- Sister John Therese Singer (1952–1958)
- Sister Marcella Gardner (1958–1964)
- Sister Hildegarde Brennan (1961–1962) -- High School
- Sister Patricia Ellen (Mary June) Secor (1964–1972) -- Grade School
- Sister Hildegarde Brennan (1964–1966) -- High School
- Sister Ann Catherine Gleason (1966–1970) -- High School
- Sister Mary June Secor (1970–1972) -- High School
- Sister Jean Elizabeth Nugent (1972–1979) -- Grade School
- Sister Eva (1979–1980)
- Sister Eva [regent principal] (1980–1982)
- Sister Enedina Rodriguez (1982–1983)
- Mrs. Christine Lamadrid (1983–1994)
- Sister Winifred (1994–1996)
- Mrs. Josephine Kenna (1996–2000)
- Mrs. Bertha Moro (2000–Present (2026))
