= St George Steam Packet Company =

Private maritime transport company

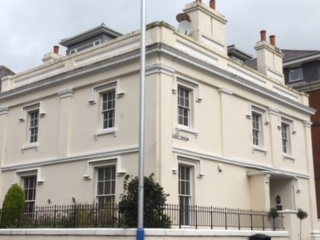
- The former offices of the St George Steam Packet Company, Douglas, Isle of Man
- Industry: Shipping
- Founded: 1821
- Defunct: 1843
- Successor: Cork Steamship Company
- Headquarters: Liverpool, England / Isle of Man
- Area served: Liverpool; Douglas; Dublin

The St George Steam Packet Company – also referred to as the Liverpool and Isle of Man Steam Packet Company or the St George Steamship Company – was a privately owned maritime transportation company incorporated in 1821. In the early 1840s the business was acquired by the Cork Steamship Company.

== Company operations ==
=== Establishment ===
The St George Steam Packet Company commenced operations in 1822. Formed the previous year, the company secured the services of the shipbuilders Thomas Wilson of Liverpool who constructed several powerful steamers for the company, one of which was the RMS St George. Further additions to the fleet followed, such as her sister ship, the RMS St. Patrick, however the St George rapidly won a reputation for comfort and speed. For a time the St George was placed on the company's Liverpool – Douglas schedule, but was subsequently transferred to the Liverpool – Dublin operation.

The best known of the early steamer concerns operating to the Isle of Man was the St George Company. Whilst it is important in relation to the foundation of the Isle of Man Steam Packet Company, it had little to do with the early development of Manx services and compared with David Napier and the Mersey and Clyde Steam Navigation Company. The St George Steam Packet Company could best be described as a group of companies. At this time individual steamers tended to have different owners and often had their own operating titles; however some shareholders owned shares in numerous steamers and in such a manner and by using the same shipping agents in each port a group was built up.

=== Operation & rivalries ===
The brand new steamer St George was placed on the Liverpool – Douglas – Greenock station on Tuesday 25 June 1822, in direct competition with Napier's City of Glasgow. Each ship sailed on the same days at the same time. A month of furious racing ensued: both ships were equally matched. However, as David Napier had two other ships on the station and was the established operator, the two concerns soon came to an agreement whereby the St George was transferred to the Liverpool – Dublin – Tenby – Bristol route in agreement that Napier would not place a steamer on that route. Apart from one call in 1827, the St George did not reappear at Douglas again until 1830. The company still maintained their operation to the Isle of Man and from April 1825 a thrice weekly service was being operated by either the Prince Llewellyn or the St David in addition to a service which was operated to North Wales.

From July 26, 1826, the Kingstown operated a service from Dublin to Douglas; in advertisements this ship actually operated under the name of the St George War Office Steam Packet. The service ceased at the end of September which at that time, with the onset of winter gales, was normal practice. The Kingstown resumed operations to the Isle of Man from July 1827 when she was placed on the main Liverpool – Douglas thrice weekly schedule. The company were trying to obtain the mail contract between the two ports and in addition to this advertised a service for light cargo.

The St David which was fairly small and slower than her rivals was offered for sale in the spring of 1828, however no interest was expressed in a purchase and she resumed plying to Douglas in April of that year. Although she was operated by the St George Group (see establishment) at this time her sailing notices appear under the name of John Watson, 19 Water Street, Liverpool, and the St George Steam Packet Offices are listed as being at 21, Water Street. This fact is important as it may be seen as a reason as to why the vessel came into disrepute, due to subsequent lack of investment and poor maintenance, this being one of the primary factors which would lead to the establishment of the Isle of Man Steam Packet Company in 1830.

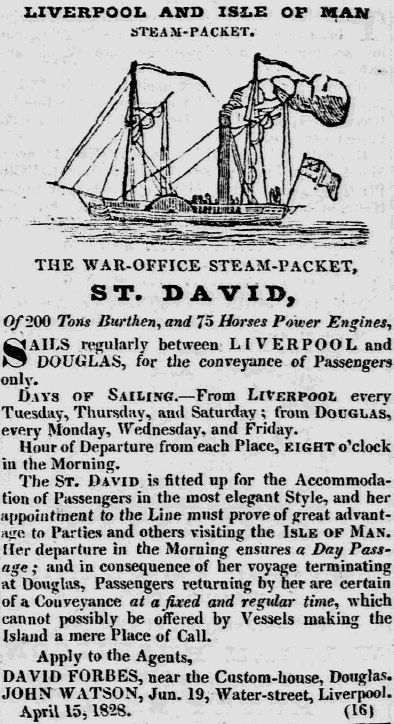
Advert for passage between Liverpool and Douglas on the St David

In 1828 the St David operating under the agency of John Watson on behalf of the St George Company secured the mail contract to the Isle of Man. The St David was able to tailor its service as opposed to the Scottish packets which called at Douglas en route from the Mersey to the Clyde and thereby provided only an indifferent winter service. The St David, because Douglas was her destination, not merely a port of call, could therefore suit her sailing times to the tides and so enter Douglas Harbour and therefore did not have to ferry her mail and passengers ashore – which in rough winter conditions could be an arduous and exhausting undertaking. Thus the St David became highly popular on the Island, as all winter she provided a regular, reliable weekly service, except for one week in October 1828, when the company replaced her with the unsuitable Satellite.

In the spring of 1829 the St David increased her service to thrice weekly. However, by this time no investment was being made in the vessel and maintenance on her was poor, with the company showing a reluctance to have her overhauled. By August the lack of regular maintenance could no longer be ignored and complaints began to be made about her unreliability and the irregularity of the mail service. During a spell of bad weather some work was undertaken, but by the end of September things had become so bad that the St David had to be withdrawn from service in order to undergo a complete overhaul.

No steamer was available to replace the St David and consequently the company resorted to chartering Mersey Ferries in order to operate the schedule, which were highly unsuitable to such an undertaking. The ferry Abbey caused particular discomfort, a contemporary report stating: "She'd not even a bed or pan, or bucket for the sick."

The St David arrived back on station on 24 November, and once more began to provide a reliable although slow service in all weather, however this was to no avail. The hiatus as a consequence of her overhaul, coupled to the unreliable service offered by the replacements, had driven the Manx population to despair. The autumn of 1829 marked a turning point in sea operations between Liverpool and Douglas. If the company had of obtained a suitable relief steamer from another part of the St George Group and given the St David a thorough overhaul the trouble with the service would not of arisen, and it is possible that the Isle of Man Steam Packet Company would not have been formed.

By the early part of 1830 it was widely known that a rival company was being formed to undertake competition. In late May the Prince Llewellyn replaced the St David for a week – no chances were being taken this time, now that a rival boat (the Mona's Isle) was under construction. By early June the main St George Company seems to of taken over the service, as notices appeared asking debtors of the St David to settle up; the affairs of her company were being cleared up.

The St George again started operating on 21 June 1830, and continued on the schedule until replaced by the Sophia Jane which arrived from Portsmouth on 1 July and operated the usual thrice weekly schedule.

=== Isle of Man Steam Packet Company ===
With the formation of the Mona's Isle Company in 1830, which would later become the Isle of Man Steam Packet Company, stern competition was offered to the St George Company who at the time were operating their steamer Sophia Jane between Liverpool and the Isle of Man. Unlike previous ships which served the Isle of Man the new company's vessel, Mona's Isle, was not constructed primarily to carry cargo and was very well appointed for the carriage of passengers.

With their vessel Mona's Isle, the remit of the new company was to open up the Liverpool – Douglas service and to beat the opposition.

On Monday 16 August Mona's Isle sailed for Liverpool. The Sophia Jane under the command of Lieutenant John Tudor, R.N., sailed at the same time and reached Liverpool one and a half minutes ahead. On Wednesday 18 August a similar race took place back to Douglas with a similar result. But on Friday 20 August, returning from Liverpool, Mona's Isle came in 40 minutes ahead. The pattern was established and Sophia Jane was regularly beaten, on one occasion in a gale, by over three hours.

The early defeats were probably caused by the fact that Mona's Isle's new engine took time to run in and full speed was not attainable at first. Mona's Isle, however, had proved herself capable of travelling between Liverpool and Douglas in eight hours at a speed of 8.5 knots (15.7 km/h; 9.8 mph).

The St. George Company engaged in a price-cutting war, offering single steerage fares for as low as 6d one way. So fierce had become the rivalry that when it became known that the Mona's Isle had gone on a trip to Bangor, the Sophia Jane was sent there to race her back to Douglas. The mail was put on the Ormrod which was so unskillfully navigated that her first landfall was St Bees Head. She finally reached Douglas in pouring rain with 200 people, nearly all on deck, after 22 hours at sea.

The St George Company withdrew the Sophia Jane and re-introduced their largest and fastest steamer, the St. George on 22 September 1830. However, Mona's Isle won the first race largely because of the astuteness of Capt. William Gill. Seeing a south-westerly gale developing, he had the coal and cargo moved to the windward side of the vessel, to prevent the windward paddle lifting out of the water.

By October 1830, Mona's Isle had established herself as the principle steamer between Liverpool and Douglas.

A letter to the Editor of the Liverpool Mercury stated:-

"Your impartiality in giving insertion to correct communications has induced me to forward you a few particulars respecting the interesting opposition at present existing in steam navigation with the Isle of Man. The triumphant result of the competition between the Mona's Isle and the Sophia Jane is pretty well known and needs no remark, which induced the St. George Company to try their last resource by placing the St. George on the station, confident that (although the Sophia Jane was beaten) the St. George could not share a similar fate. On Wednesday last the Mona's Isle and the St. George were opposed to each other in their passage from this port, and the Mona's Isle performed the distance in a shorter time, but it was on Friday that their safety was put to the test. On that day they left here together, about 11 o'clock a.m., the wind blowing right ahead and approaching to a storm, which continued to increase during the day. At 4 p.m. the hull and smoke of the St. George were left out of sight. The Mona's Isle arrived in Douglas a few minutes before one o'clock on Saturday, and the St. George not until nearly seven, being a difference of six hours in favour of the Manx boat. This is certainly the most surprising feat ever performed in steam navigation, particularly when the hitherto unrivalled character of the St. George is taken into consideration, and also the tempestuous state of the weather during the passage."

— Liverpool Mercury. Friday 1 October 1830.

=== Loss of the St George ===
On Friday 19 November 1830, under the command of Lieutenant John Tudor R.N., the St George arrived in Douglas from Liverpool with mail and passengers.

Once her passengers and mail were unloaded, the St George proceeded to take her anchorage in the vicinity of Conister Rock using the fixed chain cable which had been secured for the task. The night was stormy, with strong gusts of wind from the southwest which increased in ferocity as the wind backed to the southeast on the morning of 20 November. At 05:00hrs the chain cable holding the St George began to give way and she began to drive in between the Pollock and Conister rocks.

Steam had been kept up during the night, with the crew at their stations, but the force of the sea together with the ship's proximity to the Conister Rock meant she struck the rock before any attempt to back her out could prove successful. The St George struck the rock violently, immediately filled and settled down forward, with her head to the land and lying almost broadside to the most ruggered part of the rock.

Lieutenant Tudor immediately ordered distress signals to be made as well as the foremast to be cut away with a view to forming a raft so as that when the dawn came they might be rescued by boats from the lee side of the vessel, but this was found to be impractical. From his home at the Fort Anne Sir William Hillary observed the disaster taking place and immediately made for the pier in order to initiate a rescue. Together with Lt Robinson (RN), William Corlett (agent for the St George Steamship Company), Issac Vondy his coxswain, and a volunteer crew of 14 Sir William set out to render assistance.

On approaching the St George the lifeboat's anchor was let go to the windward, and by veering down upon the wreck an attempt was made to take off the people from the weather quarter, but the surf would not enable this to be carried out. The lifeboat was then backed between the St George and the rocks, and despite warnings from Lt Tudor of the dangers this would present to the lifeboat, the crew of the lifeboat persevered and were initially successful. The lifeboat had now got into a situation where the rolling sea was causing it to become swamped and began to sustain damage with the rudder being disabled and six out of the ten oars either broken or lost. Coupled to this, Sir William, Corlett and two boatmen had been washed overboard.

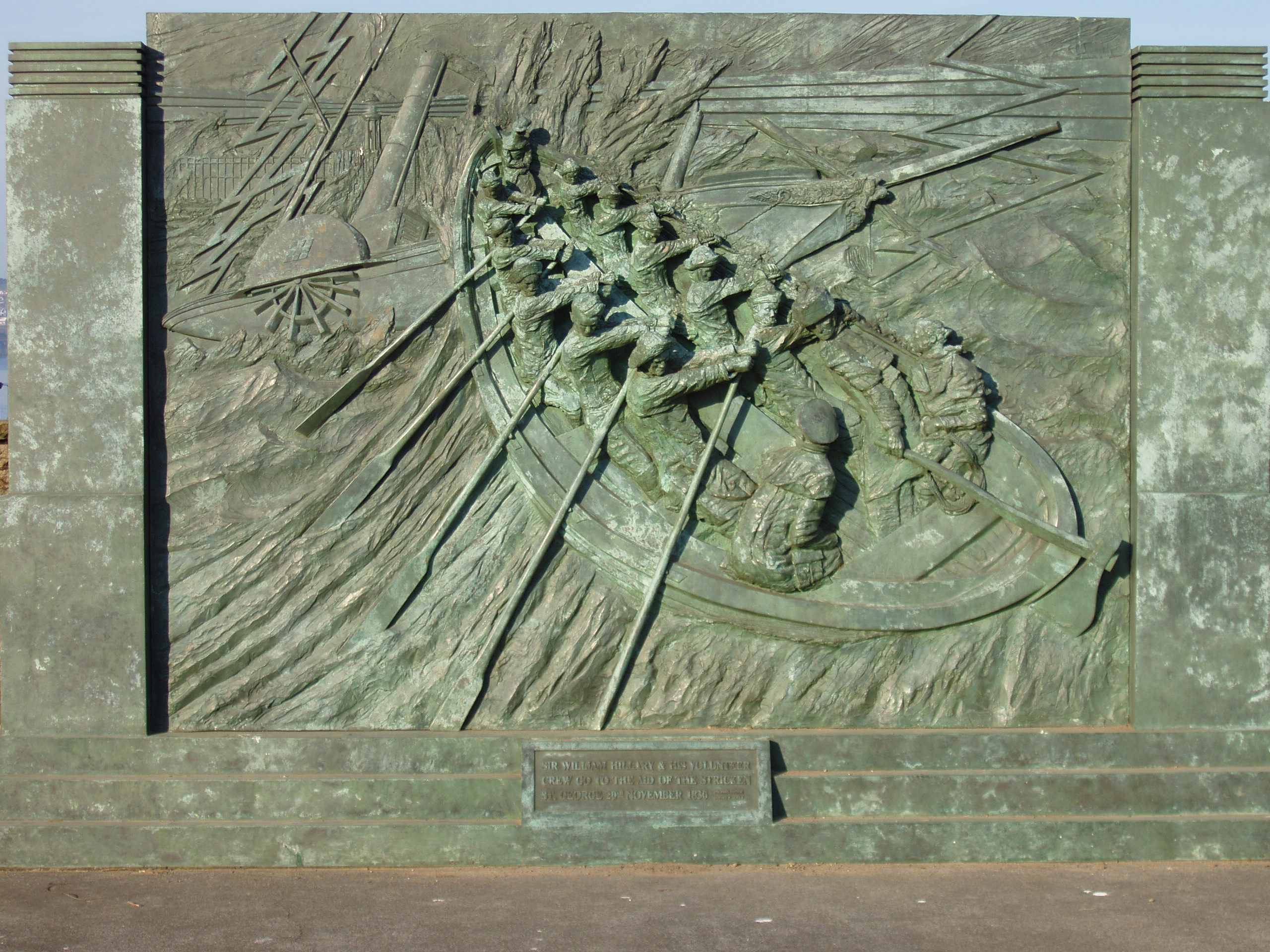
Memorial erected along the Loch Promenade in Douglas

Corlett and the two boatmen were swiftly got back into the boat, but Sir William, unable to swim, seized a rope which was hung from the vessel's side by which he was able to support himself until Lt Tudor assisted by Lt Robinson managed to get a badly injured Sir William aboard. From the disabled state of the boat and the loss of the oars it became impossible to take off the people and proceed windward by hauling up her anchor, as was originally intended. Any route to the leeward was blocked by the rigging of the mast which had been cut away and this left the lifeboat hemmed in between the wreck, the Conister Rock and by a point of rock which ran out beyond it.

The situation of the crews of the St George and the lifeboat remained perilous for two hours, a critical situation, but after time the rigging of the fallen mast was cut away with knives and an axe which were fortunately in the boat. The size of the swell increased as the tide rose and now swept the decks of the St George nearly burying the lifeboat, and one last effort was made to extricate themselves from a situation which at any time could have proved fatal.

The crew of the St George consisted of 22 and the lifeboat 18. They finally all managed to get into the lifeboat, by now taking a large quantity of water which had to be constantly bailed out by the use of buckets which had been taken from the St George. With the use of the remaining oars the lifeboat was cast off and the cable cast away, but she struck violently on the low ridge of the rock, filled, and striking again was washed over, leaving her occupants holding on by ropes. The cable was then cut, and the sea coming round the bow of the St George drove the lifeboat broadside on, upon the sheltered side of the Conister Rock thus avoiding the potential catastrophe, and they were then able to proceed towards the shore a quarter of a mile away.

They were met by two boats which had put out from the pier and proceeded through the sound to approach them under the shelter of the lee of the rock. Some of the St George's crew were transferred into the first boat, and the other boat, commanded by Lt Sleigh R.N. was able to get a line to the lifeboat and thus take it successfully in tow to the beach. None of the forty men involved were lost.

Following the rescue, Sir William Hillary received the following letter from Lieutenant John Tudor:

"My Dear Sir – Allow me to return you (in the name of the crew of the St. George and myself) our most grateful thanks for the very great personal exertions of yourself, Lieut. Robinson (RN)., Mr William Corlett and the Life Boat's crew during the gale of yesterday morning.

I want words, Sir, to express to you what we then felt, and what we shall ever feel, for the noble and determined manner in which you persevered in coming to our assistance, after we had considered it our duty to warn you off, for, the vessel having bilged, the severity of the gale, the position of the wind, and the time of the tide, there did not appear to us (amongst the heavy breakers then rolling upon Conister) the slightest chance of escape for you, and which, from the crippled state of the life boat when she afterwards left the wreck, was so nearly proving to be the case. Trusting, Sir, that you may long live to preside over an establishment your philanthropy gave birth to, and in which your humanity has always placed you amongst the foremost and most active of its members – I have the honor to remain

Your obliged, grateful, and most obedient servant."

— Lieutenant John Tudor (RN). Douglas, November 21st, 1830.

At a Meeting of the Committee of the Isle of Man District Association of the Royal National Institution, for the Preservation of Life from Shipwreck, held at the Courthouse, Douglas, 27 November 1830, presided over by the chairman, High Bailiff James Quirk Esq, it was agreed unanimously that the following report be transmitted to the Secretary of the Royal National Institution:

That the thanks of this meeting be presented to Sir William Hillary, Lieut. Robinson, William Corlett Esq, and the crew of the life boat, for their very gallant and meritorious exertions in saving the lives of the crew of the St. George.

A memorial depicting the rescue can now be seen in the sunken garden on Loch Promenade, Douglas.

=== Subsequent operations ===
The St George Company determined to continue its operations between Liverpool and Douglas however the vessels tasked with operating the schedule, the Prince Llewellyn and the Orinoco were deemed to be well below the standard which had been set by the Isle of Man Steam Packet Company. The Prince Llewellyn when running for Peel in a gale was almost wrecked off the Calf of Man, and on 13 December 1830 she collided with the Mona's Isle in Douglas Harbour and badly damaged herself resulting in repairs having to be undertaken. Consequently, transportation of the mail was undertaken by the Mona's Isle until the end of January 1831 when the Vale of Clwyd or the St Winifred resumed the contract for the St George Steam Packet Company. This however was terminated at the end of February 1831 due to deteriorating financial returns as it was considered that undertaking a sailing with mail only was not worth while, as by this time passengers had given up using this unreliable service. It was cheaper to pay the Mona's Isle to bring the mail and the St George Steam Packet Company ceased its operations to the Isle of Man.

So ended the St George Steam Packet's Douglas – Liverpool service. However, these were not the last call at the Isle of Man by the Group's ships, as in subsequent years other steamers made occasional calls.

As can be seen the story of operations of the St George Steam Packet to the Isle of Man is very complicated, more so than any other operator. The winter boat employed by the company between Liverpool and Douglas was the St David and not the Prince Llewellyn, and the events concerning the St David are important but ultimately had little direct influence on the early developments. Certainly the St George Company did not pioneer steamship services to the Isle of Man, as numerous services, such as those offered by George Langtry between 1822 and 1824 and from 1828 to 1830, the Mersey and Clyde Steam Navigation Company 1824–1831 and the Carlisle and Liverpool Steam Navigation Company 1826–1831 were also available during the period.

The St George Steam Packet Company continued operations until 1843, when it was reconstructed, the Cork Steamship Company taking over its various operations and seven of its steam ships.
