= St Patrick's and St Brigid's College =

Coordinates: 54.912°N 7.156°W

St Patrick's and St Brigid's College, Claudy
- 55 Main Street, Claudy, County Londonderry, BT47 4HR; Northern Ireland

Information
- School type: Secondary
- Motto: Believers are achievers
- Local authority: Education Authority (Western)
- Principal: P.McCullagh
- Gender: Co-educational
- Age: 11 to 16
- Enrollment: 530 (Estimate)
- Colour
- School Years: Year 8 - Year 12
- Website: spbcollege.com

St Patrick's and St Brigid's College is a secondary school located in Claudy, just outside Derry, Northern Ireland. The current principal is Mr P.McCullagh There are around 500-550 pupils

The school's mission statement is "To prepare pupils for life and work in the 21st century by enabling them to strive for the highest possible levels of Christian and human achievement."
