= Paulinus Ezeokafor =

Nigerian Prelate of the Roman Catholic Church

His Excellency, The Most Reverend Paulinus Chukwuemeka Ezeokafor
- Bishop of Awka
- Native name: Chukwuemeka
- Province: Onitsha Ecclesiastical province
- Diocese: Roman Catholic Diocese of Awka
- See: Awka
- In office: 2011–present
- Predecessor: Simon Akwali Okafor
- Previous posts: Auxiliary bishop of Awka Diocese (2007–2011); Titular Bishop of Tetci (2007–2011); Apostolic Administrator of Awka (2010-2011).

Orders
- Ordination: 30 June 1984 by Albert Obiefuna
- Consecration: 28 April 2007 by Renzo Fratini, Valerian Okeke and Solomon Amanchukwu Amatu

Personal details
- Born: 13 September 1952 (age 73) Nanka, Anambra, Nigeria
- Denomination: Roman Catholic
- Residence: Awka, Anambra state
- Education: Bigard Memorial Seminary, Enugu. Pontifical University of the Holy Cross, Rome.
- Motto: Latin: Caritas mea cum omnibus vobis in Christo Jesu – My love is with you all in Christ Jesus; (1 Corinthians 16:24)
- Coat of arms

Paulinus Chukwuemeka Ezeokafor (born 13 September 1952) is a Nigerian prelate of the Catholic Church who has served as the Catholic Bishop of the Roman Catholic Diocese of Awka since 2011. He was previously the auxiliary bishop of the diocese from 2007 to 2011.

== Life ==
He was born on 13 September 1952 in Anambra State, Nigeria. He started his seminary formation and obtained his B.Phil. in philosophy and had a degree in theology until his priestly ordination on 30 June 1984 as a Roman Catholic priest of Awka diocese by Archbishop Albert Obiefuna then Bishop of Awka. He later studied moral theology at the Opus Dei University (pontificio Universita Della Santa Croce) in Rome and obtained his masters and doctorate degrees in moral theology.He was appointed the Auxiliary Bishop of Awka on 20 January 2007 by Pope Benedict XVI and also assigned the Titular Bishop of Tetci. Until appointment he served as the Rector of St Dominic Savio Minor Seminary, Akpu in Awka from 1996 to 2007. On 28 April 2007, he was consecrated bishop and later took canonical possession of the Roman Catholic Diocese of Awka on 8 July 2011.
