= List of villages in Rivers State =

This is a list of villages and settlements in Rivers State, Nigeria arranged by local government area(LGA) and district/area (with postal codes also given).

== By postal code ==
Below is a well arranged list of polling units which includes villages and schools arranged according to postal code.

LGA	District / Area	Postal code	Villages
Abua/Odual	Abua / Odual	510102	Abada; Abua; Agada; Akani; Amalem; Amaraka; Amorota; Aniningboko; Anyu; Arukwo; Dibiriga; Efebiri; Egboama; Egbolom; Egbom; Egunughan; Ekunuga; Elok; Emago; Emeh; Emekesue; Emelego; Emesu; Emilaghan; Emirikpoko; Emon-Ema Emabu; Engeni; Esala; Esidia-Ogbema; Forest-Reserve; Iyak; Kola-Ogbogbo; Lower Orashi River; Obaranyi; Odaga; Odedum; Ogbema; Ogbema Koku; Ogbokuma; Ogbologbo Plantain; Ogboloma; Oghora; Okana; Okoboh; Okomade; Okpedem; Omokwa; Opikiri; Opu-Ogbogbo; Oruama; Otabha; Otari; Owerewere; Plantains; Serebia
Ahoada East	Ahoada	510101	Abarikpo; Ahoada; Akoh; Ala-Ahoada; Anakpa; Ebiriba/Ikodi; Ebiro; Edeeha; Edeoha; Ekpene; Idoki; Idu-Obosiuku; Idu-Osobile; Igbuduya; Ihuaba; Ihugboko; Ihuowo; Ijuaje; Ikata; Joinkprama; Kunusha; Membe; Oboh; Obolobolo; Obumeze; Ochigba; Odawu; Odereke; Odiabidi; Odido; Odiemudie; Odiemusana; Odierenguroji; Odiokwu; Ododi; Ogbede; Ogbelle; Ogbo; Ogoda; Ogua-Akmima; Ohigbo; Okarki; Okebe; Okpoga-Ulo-Udo; Okponmini; Oluokobo; Oporowo; Orija; Orupata; Oshi; Oshiebele; Oshugboko; Oyiba I & II; Ozachi; Ubarama; Ubio; Ukerede; Upata
Ahoada West	Ahoada	510101	Agbo/Akogbologba; Akaramirin; Akinima; Anwurugbokor; Better Land; Edugberi; Emezi; Ibrass; Igoria; Ihuechi; Isua; Isusa; Mbiama; Odiapiti; Odieke; Okolobiama; Okparaki; Oruama; Oshika; Ubeta; Ubie; Upatabo; Uyalama
Akuku Toru	Akuru Toru	504103	Abissa; Abonnema; Elem Sangama; Idama; Kula; Obonoma; Oru-Sangama; Soku
Andoni	Andoni	503102	Aam-Ekut; Aama-Runner; Afradiki; Aganna; Aganofor; Agbachichama; Agbadama; Agbadem; Agbakoroma; Agwut Obolo; Ama Sunday; Amanku; Amansa; Amaoke; Amatamuno; Anyama; Anyama-Aganna; Anyamaboko; Asakokola; Asakokolo; Asarama; Asuk-Ama; Asuk-Oyet; Asurubaa; Ataba; Aturube; Ayama; Darile; Dema; Dimama; Ebon-Okolo; Ebukuma; Echitcham; Egbomu; Egbormu; Egwede; Ekede; Friday; Glilea; Ilotombi; Ibotobom; Ibotokpon; Ichama; Igbanga; Ikuru; Inyoukpo; Isidum; Isioke; Isiokwan; Iwo; Iwoogone; Kapamant; Kwake; Mertege; Muma; Nchiama; Ngo; Obiama; Obot-Usut; Obukolum; Ogbidim; Okokiri; Okoro Iro; Okoroboile; Okorolo; Okukpoi; Okwaniok; Oloma; Otak; Otiga; Otuafik; Otudon; Otugan; Oyorokoto; Samanga; Unyeada; Uyengala; Weret
Asari Toru	Buguma	504101	Abalama; Aluka; Angulama; Apama; Bekinkiri; Buguma; Dagogakiri; Ebuye-Dokubekiri; Gogokiti; Ido; Ifoko; Isia; Kalama; Krakrama; Minama; Pakama; Munguma-ama; Iyala-ama; Ojiama; Ojima; Okpo /Idema; Omekwe; Operoma; Omekwe-Tariama; Owoko; Sama; Sama-Naguakiri; Sangama; Tema
Bonny	Bonny	503101	Adamakiri; Agbala; Akpakpasu; Alaasiakiri; Amanadama; Angalabie; Asaramatoru; Atabakiri; Bartholomy; Beregade; Biemekiri; Bilemekiri; Binye; Birayekiri; Boloba; Bonny; Bony-Onwon; Charuama; Crutoru; Dokubotorughia; Eferewari; Fakpa; Febiri; Gbolokiri; Georgekiri; Green; Greenkiri; Ibiribiri; Ijanikwe; Inawanacha; Iwoama; Iwoama-Kuruama; Jackmay; Kalabiama; Kuruama; Kuruma; Ligakiri; Magbegbekiri; Mbikiri; Mbisu; Namabie; Nenekin; Nwachu; Obetene; Ogbomumo; Ogbuluama; Ogidigba; Ogumabie; Okolobie; Okoloma-Iwoma; Okolomable; Okpomadapa; Oloma; Olomabia; Omubiokolo; Onwonwokiri; Opiriafan; Opo; Oporbakiri; Opukiri; Orutoru; Otokolomabie; Otukpo; Otutunbi; Owaopiri; Owuopili; Perside; Pondomakiri; Samai; Samgama; Sampite; Sombiekiri; Tumbikulu; Wasakiri; Wastom
Degema	Degema	504102	Bille; Bakana; Bukuma; Consulale; Degema; Elem Ama; Ke; Obuama; Old Bakana; Tombia; Usokun
Eleme	Eleme	501101	Acharama; Adama; Agbonchia; Agbeta; Agbi; Akara; Akaraolu; Akpajo; Akpakpan; Alejor; Alesa; Aleto; Alode; Aluakpajo; Alualesa; Alubeokpa; Aluebo; Aluejor; Alueken; Aluoken; Alungwa; Awalama; Chumu; Chittey; Ebubu; Echaapere; Efere; Egbalor; Egbara; Ejamah; Ejialejor; Ejii; Ekara; Ekenkua; Eken-ogban; Ekongor; Ekorokoro; Ekornwi; Ekpangbala; Ekporo; Eta-bai; Eteo; Ewika; Ewuu; Eyaa; Makani; Mao; Mbuma-eta; Nchia-Eleme; Nda; Ngejalawa; Ngala; Ngelale; Ngesia; Ngofa; Ngololo; Njuru; Nkpaala; Nkpornwi; Nkeleoken; Nnonoa-eta; Nsin-akukuri; Nsisioken; Nwaja; Nwaji; Nyime-eta; Obiban; Obini-eta; Obini-ngwa; Obini-nkikee; Obolo; Ochani; Odaranmu; Odido-Eleme; Ogale; Ogoloma; Ogologbaa; Oka-ebem; Oken-eta; Okerewa; Okole; Okori; Okpa; Okpako; Oku; Ollorte; Onne; Onimbie; Onura; Oya; Panya; Tekara
Emohua	Emohua Town	511102	Agbandele; Ahi Ogbakiri; Ahia Wokoma; Akpabu; Amapa; Bundele; Chio; Chiwokanwere; Egamini; Egbeda; Egbelu; Ehio; Ehioprada; Ekunchara; Elele Alimni; Emohua; Ereku; Eza-Nkpokwu; Hiamali; Ibaa; Ibomimere; Ikungachinwo; Imere; Isiodu; Itu; Izuoya; Mbuama; Mbuegizi; Mechiemechi; Mgbu Ehinmi; Mgbu Igobo; Mgbu Ika; Mgbu Ogbakiri; Mgbuajah; Mgbuakni; Mgbuateta; Mgbuayim; Mgbuealalu; Mgbuedah; Mgbuelia; Mgbuemnubade; Mgbueto; Mgbuikor; Mgbuitanwos; Mgbuogbakiri; Mgbuohia; Mgbuokporo; Mgbuomohia; Mgbuwoke; Ndele; Ngbere; Ngbereka; Ngbuobogizi; Nkpob; Nmehielle; Obelle; Obohia; Obugner-Unimini; Ubimini; Odegu; Odohua; Ogbakiri; Ogbelegba; Ogbola; Ohamyim; Ohioomuigwuemi; Oluonugbuda; Omaibo; Omeke; Omeneta; Omi Dikenuaji; Omohia; Omokpiriku; Omorihuru; Omota; Omu Agala; Omu Agiri; Omu Amah; Omu chip; Omu Eechi; Omu Ibah; Omu Ikea; Omu Isuea; Omu Mbom; Omu Noro-Omue; Omu Nwenea; Omu Nwibike; Omu Ocham; Omu Sukuta; Omu Woka; Omu-Didenuaji; Omuabali; Omuade; Omuagbaoke; Omuagula; Omuali; Omuama Omuanaa; Omuaza; Omuchioha; Omuchiou; Omudede; Omueti; Omueze; Omuika; Omuikea; Omuishioha; Omukoro; Omumonyor; Omuoda; Omuogboi; Omuoji; Omuokiedinma; Omuokpata; Omuordm; Omuordu; Omuorupu; Omuosa; Omuosu; Omuotam; Omuovona; Omuse/Omusemgbe-Lela; Onimini; Onimuli; Onimuli-Oji; Orlu-Igbaa; Osa; Ovogo; Rumeeleni; Rumeoro; Rumewhor; Rumiji; Rumodogo; Rumou Kparae Kah; Rumuagwor; Rumuebagwor; Rumuekpe; Rumuigbaa; Rumuigwenya; Rumukani; Rumuohe; Rumuokwu; Ubimini; Udoha; Ukaeli; Ukwu Waterside; Omudioga; Omuagi; Aliagha;
Etche	Etche	512101	Abara; Achara; Afara; Agbalu; Akwa; Akwukobi; Amaji; Amaku; Chokocho; Chokotaa; Edegelem; Egbeke; Egbu; Egwi; Elele; Ezelaka; Ezikohia; Igbo; Igbodo; Ihie; Ikem; Ikewerrengwa; Ikpo; Isu; Mbaa; Ndashi; Nihi; Nwuba; Obakwu; Oberi; Obi; Obibi; Obite; Obokwu; Obono; Obwaro; Odagwa; Odagwa-Waterside; Odegwa; Odufor; Ogida; Ohanta; Ohim; Okehi; Okomoko; Okomoko-Akpoku; Okonoche; Okoroagu; Okoroagu Waterside; Okudu; Olwere-Ngwo; Opiro; Owaza; Owu; Ozuzu; Rakwango; Rumumumu; Rumuolo; Ukechi; Ulakwo; Ulmuode; Umechem; Umoga; Umu Oyere; Umuakirikpo; Umuakuru; Umuakwu; Umuanyagu; Umuasukpu; Umuaturua; Umubike; Umuchoko; Umudele; Umudike; Umudu; Umuebulu; Umuechere; Umuechie; Umuede; Umuekele; Umuekwo; Umuelechi; Umueze; Umueze-Ulakwo; Umughi; Umuka; Umukpo; Umumba; Umumbiri; Umunju; Umunluoko; Umuobaka; Umuoche; Umuochinana; Umuodiri; Umuofor; Umuogodo; Umuokom; Umuokwo; Umuola; Umuomara; Umuome; Umuoye;
Gokana	Gokana	501103	B. Dere; Barako; Bera; Biara; Bodo; Bomu; Deken; Deoyor; Gbe; Goi; Giokoo; K. Dere; Kibangba; Kpor; Lewe; Mogho; Nwe-biara; Nwe-ol; Yeghe
Ikwerre	Ikwerre	511101	Adanta; Agbaoga; Agwa/Nuahua; Agwara; Ahiniri; Akpabu; Aluu; Apani; Ekuche; Elele; Ezeogo; Igwuruta; Igwuruta-Ali; Imogu; Ipo; Isiokpo; Itu; Mbunta; Mgbaogba; Mgbo; Mgbodo; Mgbu-Ahana; Mgbuanyuri; Mgbuefitibia; Mgbuhie; Mgbumini; Mgbuodo; Mgbuodukwu; Mgbuogidi; Mgbuokiri; Mgbuokwukwu; Mgbuonyi; Nkaralua; Obelle; Obelle/Edoha; Obiti; Obo; Oborum; Ogankira; Ogbasara; Ogbasara-Imea; Ogboda; Okperekpe; Omademe; Omagwa; Omaku; Omaraike; Omerelu; Omesiobi; Omihua; Omizua; Omoawa; Omobiri; Omuadi; Omuagu; Omuolo; Imogu; Omuketu; Omuagubia; Omuagwawirie; Omuahunwo; Omuchagor; Omuchama; Omuchetu; Omuchi; Omuchinwo; Omuchiolu; Omuchsor; Omudagwa; Omudari; Omudidia; Omuechem; Omuegwa; Omuehia; Omuehie; Omueke; Omuele; Omueze; Omugbala; Omuigwe; Omuigwe-Omute; Omuike; Omuikega; Omuiopi; Omuketai; Omukiole; Omukpiriku; Omukume; Omukwata; Omukwosi; Omumini; Omuna; Omungbe; Omunkpu-Omute; Omunkwo; Omunobo; Omunwonjor; Omuobaa; Omuodu; Omuoduku; Omuogboro; Omuogwor; Omuohechi; Omuohia; Omuohiaa; Omuohie; Omuokiri; Omuokirika; Omuoko; Omuokpa-Omukuosi; Omuolori; Omuolu; Omuonua; Omuoparaaga; Omuosi; Omuota; Omuotiua; Omuotutua; Omuoviri; Omure; Omute; Omutogbule; Omuueka; Omuoda; Omuwhiei; Omuwonini; Omuzua; Onwali; Orua; Ozuaha; Rumuekpe; Ubabah; Ubima; Ubiti; Ubordu; Umuchi; Umukine; Umukpuru; Uuokela
Khana	Bori	502101	Baghayagbe; Banchabone; Betem; Bien Gwara; Bori; Deken; Eken; Gbam Boue; Gure; Ka-Gwara; Kani; Kaani Babbe; Kapnor; Kayangbe; Kerekekiri; Kono Boue; Luawii; Luuyor_Gwara; Du_Laala; Ndagbami; Norkuri Boue; Notem; Sii; Uegure Boue; ZaaKpon
Khana	Khana	502102	Agbalekan Ama; Akoro- Sogbo; Ayama; Baen 1; Bale; Bane; Bangha; Bara - Kani Sogbo; Barako - Saako; Bass - Luekun; Beakoro - Beeri; Beam; Bebbe Court; Bere; Bianui -Bamgha; Bonu; Buan; Bunu - Bangh; Daen; Dalorri; Emeh; Iuere-Beeri; Kaani; Kabanghaa; Kalaoko; Kazon; Kenwikun; Kere; Kono; Korokoro Luekun; Korowan; Kpaa; Kpeng; Kpong; Kwawa; Lorre; Losoe Sogbo; Lubara; Luebe; Marihu; Murmga Sogho; Nonwa - Sogho; Nyobe -Bangha; Nyogan Luekun; Nyokuru; Okwali; Opuoko; Peka - Sogbo; Pero -Ue; Posirisu - Duyaakara; Pue; Saa-Beeri; Simbe Banga Luekun; Sogbo; Teenana; Uegwere; Wiiyaakpara; Taabaa.
Obio/Akpor	Obio/Akpor	500102	Alakahia; Atali; Choba; Egbelu; Elelenwo; Elimgbu; Eliozu; Elipparanwo; Eneka; Iriebe; Iwofe; Megbuesilaru; Mgbuoba; Mpakurche; Nkpa; Nkpelu-p; Ogbogoro; Oginigba; Ore- Igwe; Rukpokwo; Rukpolu -Obio; Rumolumeni; Rumu -okwurusi; Rumuadaolu; Rumuahalu; Rumuchiorlu; Rumudogo; Rumuegba; Rumuekini; Rumuekwe; Rumueme; Rumuepirieli; Rumuepirikom; Rumuewhara; Rumuibekwe; Rumuigbo; Rumumduru; Rumuodara; Rumuodomaya; Rumuoji; Rumuokro; Rumuokwachi; Rumuokwuota; Rumuokwurusi; Rumuola; Rumuolukwu; Rumuomasi; Rumuomoi; Rumuosi; Rumuoto; Rumurolu; Rumusara; Rumuwaji; Rumuwegwu; Runuobiakani; Ozuoba; Woji, Rumualogu
Ogba/Egbema/Ndoni	Ndoni	510104	Adiai - Obiofu; Agwe; Amuajie; Ase - Imonita; Ase-Azaga; Isara; Isiukwa; Ndoni; Oboaso; Odugili; Ogbeogene; Ogu; Onikwu; Owajinobia; Ugbaja; Umuigwe; Umuorieke; Utu
Ogba/Egbema/Ndoni	Ogba / Egbema	510103	Agah; Akabuka; Akputa Waterside; Alinso -Okenu; Ama; Eboaha; Ede; Egbema; Egboda; Egita-Akabuta; Ekpe -Aggah; Ekpe -Mgbede; Elehia; Elieta; Erema; Ibewa; Ikiri; Itu; Kreigani; Mgbede; Obagi; Obakata; Obidi; Obiebe; Obieti; Obigbo; Obihuru; Obiozumini/Obukegi; Obite; Oboh; Obokroha; Obosi; Obrikom; Obuburu; Ogbogu; Ohali-Elu; Ohali-Usomini; Ohiauga; Okansu; Okposi; Okpurukpula; Okuku; Okwuzu; Omoku; Onuesi -Ogu; Osiakpu; Uju; Ukpazi; Usomini
Ogu/Bolo	Ogu / Obolo	500104	Bolo; Ele; Ogu
Okrika	Okrika	500103	Abam - Ama II; Abioboama; Agbkien- Ama; Andikiri; Asemeningolike; Dankiri; Dikiboama; Ekerekana; George -Ama; Ibaka; Ibuluy-Dikiboama; Ikirikoama; Ikpokiri - Ama II; Isaka; Iwokiri - Ama; Iyokiri; Kalio -Ama; Mbikiri; Ndubusiama; Ngbagbebokoama; Ngololo; Oba - Ama; Obiarime -Ama; Odokorobie; Ogan-Ama; Ogbogbo; Ogoloma; Okirika; Okochiri; Okujagu Ama; Okumgba -Ama; Omoaobi; Omodere -Ama; Opuada -Ama; Oraberekiri -Ama; Otobipi; Owuogonoama; Sara -Ama; Semembiri -Ama; Teriapu Kiriama
Omuma	Omuma	512102	Eberi; Egbelu; Umerim; Umuabali; Umuagwa; Umuakali; Umudik; Umudou; Umukamanu; Umunachi; Umuokwa; Umuolilo; Umuoyoro; Umuroke; Umusu; Umuwa; Umuru-Ofeh
Opobo/Nkoro	Opobo	503103	Opobo Communities are: Epelema; Ikwata; Iloma; Kalaibiama; Kalasunju; Minima; Obo- Town; Queens Town. Nkoro Communities include: Afakani; Ottoni; Kpokpo; Diepiriye/Opurokuno; Olom Ama; Job Ama; Olom-Nkoro; Iwoama-Nkoro; Ayama I; Ayama II; Suku Ama; Olilokiri; Dime Ama; Ogor Ama; Obionhuru;
Oyigbo	Ndoki	502104	Afa Uku; Afam; Afam Nta; Azusogu; Egberu; Mgboji; Mrihu; Obeakpu; Obeta; Obumku; Okoloma; Okponta; Umuagbai; Umuosi
Oyigbo	Oyigbo	502103	Asa; Komkom; Obeama; Oyigbo
Port-Harcourt	Port Harcourt (Rural)	500101	Abuloma; Amadio-Ama; Boibu-Oromerizemgbu; Elekahia; Okuru; Orada Diobu; Orogbum; Oroworukwo; Rainbow Town; Rumuoparali; Runiu Kalgbo
Tai	Tai	501102	Ban- Ogoi; Bara - Obara; Barayira; Botem; Bunu; Emu; Gbam; Gbene -ue; Ggaken; Gio; Horo; Kenkoro; Kira; Korokoro; Koroma; Kpite; Kporgbor; Ledor; Nonwa - Uedume; Nwenkowa; Oloko; Sakpenwa; Sime; Tai; Tombee

== By electoral ward ==
Below is a list of polling units, including villages and schools, organised by electoral ward.

LGA	Ward	Polling Unit Name
Abua-Odual	Abua I	Ogbema I, Town Hall; Ogbema II, C. P. S Hall; Ogbema III, C. P. S Hall; Ogbema IV, Town Hall; Iguta Adauyo Town Hall I; Iguta Adauyo Town Hall II; Okunny-Adibuo, Town Hall I; Okunny-Adibuo, Town Hall II; Okunny-Adibuo, Town Hall III; State School Hall, Oto-Otoh; Ephelepheel Town Hall; Oma-Obugham Town Hall; Kalibiama, Town Hall; Emoom-Ema Town Hall I; Emoom-Ema Town Hall II; School Hall, Ooke; Okpikiri Town Hall I; Okipikiri Town Hall II; Isama Town Hall; Iguta Town Hall; Emilaghan I Town Hall; Emilaghan II Town Hall; Emilaghan III Town Hall; Emilaghan IV Town Hall; Omelema I Town Square; Omelema II Town Square; Omelema III School Hall; Omelema IV School Hall; Emilaghan V Ekool Omabi
Abua-Odual	Abua II	Efibiri Town Hall I; Efibiri Town Hall II; Okana Town Hall, Omimegbo I; Okana Town Hall, Ominigbo II; Okana Town Hall I; Okana Town Hall II; Oghora Town Hall; Oto-Obinoma, Play Ground; Arukwo I Town Hall; Arukwo II, Dispensary Hall Arukwo
Abua-Odual	Abua III	C. P. S. Hall 1 Odaga; Town Hall Odaga; C. P. S. Hall 2 Odaga; Town Hall Aka-Omokwa; Emomema Town Hall; Omokwa Town Hall; Idora-Awari Town Hall I; Idora-Awari Town Hall II; Osuani Hall; Otari Town Hall; Family Square; Baptist Church Otari Town Hall; Walaku Town Hall; C. P. S. Hall Otari III
Abua-Odual	Abua IV	Amalem Town Hall; U. P. E. Hall, Amalem; Omaraka Town Hall; Ayama, Court Hall; G. S. S Abua Hall; Onyegula Family Hall; Agana Family Hall, Ekool Egana
Abua-Odual	Emughan I	Okoboh Town Hall; State School Okoboh, State School Hall; Obarany Town Hall; State School Hall, Obarany; Emabu Town Hall; Essony Family Hall; Emesu Town Hall
Abua-Odual	Emughan II	Aminigboko Ukwo Hall; C. P. S. Hall, Aminigboko I; Aminigboko II, Town Hall; Egunughan Town Hall I; Egunughan Town Hall II; Owerewere Town Hall; C. P. S. Hall, Owerewere II; C. P. S. Hall, Owerewere III; Owerewere Town Hall IV; C. P. S. Hall, Aminiowere I; Health Center, Aminiowere II
Abua-Odual	Otapha	Agada I, Town Hall; Agada II, Town Hall; Agada I, School Hall; Agada II, School Hall; Dighiriga Town Hall I; Dighiriga Town Hall II; Emelesue Town Hall; Serebia Town Hall; Ogbokuma Town Hall; Obiani Port, Emelesue
Abua-Odual	Okpeden	Elok Town Hall; Elok School Hall, Compound I; Elok School Hall, Compound II; Iyak Town Hall; Ogbemakoku Town Hall; Ogonokom Town Hall I; Ogonokom School Hall II; Ogonokom Town Hall, Ogonokom III; Egbolom Town Hall I; Egbolom Town Hall II; Egbolom School Hall; Emoh Town Hall I; Emoh Town Hall II; Emoh Town Hall III; Agada I, Town Hall; Iighom Town Hall; Iighom School Hall; Emoh Health Center; Egbolom Town Hall
Abua-Odual	Emelego	U. P. E School Hall, Emelego III; Obot Camp Town Hall; Obhinyamaan Town Hall; Onuoghagha Town Hall; U. P. E. School Hall, Emelego III; State School Hall, Emelego II; Town Hall, Emelego I; Town Hall, Emelego II; Town Hall, Emelego III; School Hall, Obhiny-Kpaghaagh; Town Hall, Obhu-Okun; Primary School Compound; Town Hall, Ogbema; State School Hall, Okolomade II; U. P. E. School Hall
Abua-Odual	Emago-Kugbo	Town Hall, Anyu Obosi; Town Hall, Abere Square; State School Hall, Emago I; Town Hall, Emago I; State School Hall, Emago II; State School Hall, Emago III; State School Hall, Emago IV; Town Hall, Ekughuma; Ebililagh Town Hall; State School Hall/Emago II
Abua-Odual	Akani	Town Hall, Amuruto I; Town Hall, Amuruto II; Town Hall, Amuruto III; State School Hall, Amuruto I; State School Hall Amuruto II; State School Hall Amuruto III; Town Hall, Akani II; State School Hall, Akani I; State School Hall, Akani II; Town Hall, Akani I; State School Hall, Akani III; State School Hall, Akani IV
Abua-Odual	Anyu	Town Hall, Obedum; State School Hall, Obedum; State School Hall, Anyu I; State School Hall, Anyu II; Anyu Town Hall I; Anyu Town Hall II; State School Hall, Ekunuga I; State School Hall, Ekunuga II; Ekunuga Town Hall; State School Hall, Emirikpoko I; State School Hall, Emirikpoko II; Emirikpoko Town Hall I; Emirikpoko Town Hall II; Odau Town Hall; State School Hall, Odau I; State School Hall, Odau II; Olodi Square, Odau
Ahoada East	Ahoada I	Town Square I; Town Square II; Town Square III; Town Square IV; Market Square; Inyeneke, Igbu-Oshi; Family Hall, Igbu-Oshi; Idoko Hall, Igbu-Oshi; Oshii; Echikwa Layout, Igbu-Oshi
Ahoada East	Ahoada II	Iguru Hall, Igbu-Ogbor; State School, Igbu-Ogbor; G. T. C Road; Near Town Hall; Along Igbu Ogbor Road I; Along Igbu Ogbor Road II
Ahoada East	Ahoada III	Village Square I; Village Square II; Village Square III; Village Square IV; Village Square V; Village Square VI; Odiemelu/Location I; Odiemelu/Location II; Odiemelu/Location III
Ahoada East	Ahoada IV	Obele/Ihugbo, Town Centre Ahoada Urban; Prison Yard, Ahoada Urban IV; Ihudhedhe, Ahoada Urban IV; Fed Low Cost Housing Estate; Harcourt Estate; Olivet Nursery School; Omoku Road; County School; Ramat Bus-Stop; U. P. E. School; Hospital Bus-Stop; Palace Gate, Ahoada Urban IV; County High School; Ekpena Road I; Ekpena Road II; Ekpena Road III
Ahoada East	Uppata I	Market Square Edeoha; Umuchi, Hall Edeoha; Health Center Edeoha; U. P. E. School Edeoha; Ikolo Sda Edeoha; Umudha Hall Edeoha; Town Hall Edeoha; Civic Center I, Edeoha; Civic Center II, Edeoha; Umu-Agwo Hall, Edeoha; Ishiugbulu Hall, Edeoha; U. P. E. School, Edeoha; Okpouadodu Palace, Edeoha; Town Hall Okpoguadodu; U. P. E. School Okpoguadodu I; Edduha Hall; Civic Center Old Ahoada
Ahoada East	Uppata II	Odiereka Town Hall, Ochigba; Town Hall, Ochigba; Ihuechi, Ochigba Town Square; State School, Ochigba; Market Square, Ochigba; State Sch, Ikata; State School Ikata; Ogbor Town Hall Ikata; Umuachala Hall Ikata; Village Square Ikata; Town Hall Ozochi; Igbu-Oshi Ozochi River Side
Ahoada East	Uppata III	Igbu-Eboh, Ula-Upata Town Hall; Igbu-Iyakpa, Ula-Upata Town Hall; Igbu-Unama, Ula-Upata; Town Hall Ula-Upata I Town Square; Town Hall, Ula-Upata II; Town Hall, Udebu Upata; Town Hall, Ihubuluko; Town Hall, Ula-Ikata; Town Hall, Ihuike
Ahoada East	Uppata IV	Town Hall Okporowo; State School Okporowo; Umu-Akpu Hall Okporowo; Unakala Hall, Okporowo; Olulu Hall, Odiabidi; Town Hall, Odiabidi; State School, Odiabidi; Market Square Odiabidi; U. P. E. School, Okoma I; Town Hall Okoma I; Town Hall Okoma II
Ahoada East	Uppata V	Town Hall Ogbele; State School Ogbele; Ishikolo Hall Ogbele I; Ishikolo Hall Ogbele II; Okulaje Hall Ogbele I; Odoyi Hall Ogbele I; Town Hall Oshi, Ugbokor; State School Oshiugbokor, Ogbele; Town Hall, Obumeze Ogbele; Ashuko Layout, Obumeze; State School, Obumeze; Okpe-Ugbulu, Obumeze Square; Ogba Layout, Obumeze
Ahoada East	Uppata VI	Igbu-Igbor, Ihuowo I Town Centre; Igbu-Igbor, Ihuowo II Town Centre; Town Hall I, Ihuowo; Town Hall II, I Huowo; Odu-Okusu Ihuaba Town Square; Town Hall Ihuaba; State School Ihuaba; Town Hall, Idoke I; Town Hall, Idoke II; U. P. E. School Idoke; Igbo-Oligbo; Health Center, Ihuowo; Igbu-Okpu Ihuowo; Ihuama, Town Hall
Ahoada East	Akoh I	Town Hall I, Odiemerenyi; Igbu-Umasa, Odimerenyi; Town Hall II, Odimerenyi; Igbu- Umasa Odimerenyi; Umuajie Play Ground, Odimerenyi; Town Hall, Odhiemudhie; Town Hall, Odiemessama; Town Hall, Ekpena; Town Hall, Odhieje; Umu- Agalaga Hall
Ahoada East	Akoh II	Town Hall, Ihugbugo; Igbuho Hall, Ihugbuogo; Town Hall, Odieke-Akoh; Town Hall, Okporomini; Town Hall, Eligbo; Abuluni Hall, Ihuobogo; Primary School, Ihuobogo; Village Square, Okporomini; Play Ground, Eligbo
Ahoada East	Akoh III	Ichidhio Hall Ogbo Town Square; Umuchi Hall Ogbo; Igbumerehall Ogbo Town; State School Ogbo; Town Hall Ogbo I; Umuchi Hall, Abarikpo; Market Square, Abarikpo; Ibagwa Hall, Abarikpo; Town Hall, Abarikpo I; Ukani-Ula Hall, Ihuaje I; Town Hall Ihuaje; Town Hall Ula-Ehuda; Umu-Ochor Hall, Ula Ehuda; Ahoada Road
Ahoada West	Ediro I	Town Hall, Akinima; Primary School, Akinima; Town Hall, Ishionya (Akinima); Town Hall, Oshie I; Town Hall, Oshie II
Ahoada West	Ediro II	Town Hall I, Mbiama; Town Hall II, Mbiama; Primary School, Mbiama; Primary School Oruama/Eneda
Ahoada West	Joinkrama	Primary School, Odawu; Town Hall, Edagberi; Primary School, Edagberi; Ogubor Town Square, Edagberi; Town Square, Better Land; Town Hall, Isua; Primary School, Isua; Science Center Isua; Town Hall, Ususu; Primary School, Ususu
Ahoada West	Okarki	Town Hall I, Okarki; Town Hall II, Okarki; Primary School, Okarki; Town Hall, Akiogbologbo; Town Hall, Agbo; Town Hall, Okarki; Primary School, Ikodi I; Town Hall, Ikodi II; Primary School, Kunusha; Primary School, Igovia; Town Hall, Okolobiama; Primary School, Udoda; Primary School, Ogbogolo; Okparaki Town Hall; Primary School, Egboama; Ebi Square, Egboama; Primary School, Kala-Ogbogolo; Primary School, Opu-Ogbogolo
Ahoada West	Igbuduya I	Town Hall, Okogbe; Primary School Okogbe; Primary School Okogbe II; Community Sec. School, Okogbe; Town Hall, Uyakama; Primary School, Ogbologbolo; Town Hall, Ogbologbolo; Town Hall, Obodhi; Town Hall, Odigwe; Town Hall, Ogbede
Ahoada West	Igbuduya II	Town Hall, Idu-Ekpeye; Primary School, Idu-Ekpeye; Community Sec. School, Idu-Ekpeye; Town Hall, Ebrass; Town Hall, Ukpeliede; Town Hall, Akala-Olu; Town Hall, Akalamini
Ahoada West	Igbuduya III	Town Hall, Odioluji/Ele-Uma; Town Hall, Odiopiti/Odiogbor; Town Hall, Odieke; Town Hall, Enitoi, II; Town Hall, Emezi I; Town Hall, Emezi II
Ahoada West	Igbuduya IV	Town Hall, Ukpatabo; Primary School I, Ukpatabo; Primary School II, Ukpatabo; Primary School III, Ukpatabo; Town Hall, Anakpor; Town Hall, Ula-Okobo I; Town Hall, Ula-Okobo II; Town Hall, Oshika
Ahoada West	Ubie I	Town Hall, Odiereke-Ubie; Market Square, Odiereke-Ubie; Primary School, Odiereke Ubie; Public Square Odiereke Ubie; Town Hall, Ombor; Town Hall, Oshiobele; Town Hall, Olokuma; Town Hall, Ikodu-Ekpeye
Ahoada West	Ubie II	Odihiokpu Hall, Ubeta; Ibaewa Hall; Odhiogulu Hall; Town Hall, Ihuechi
Ahoada West	Ubie III	Town Hall, Anwunugbokor; Town Hall, Odhiogbokor; Town Hall, Odioku; State School, Odioku; Igbu-Uba, Oyigba; Igbu-Oyigba; Primary School, Ubrama; Town Hall, Ubrama; Town Hall, Owube; Town Hall, Ubio; Primary, School- Ubio; Town Hall, Odido
Ahoada West	Ubie IV	Town Hall, Ula-Ubie; Town Hall, Ebriba I; Town Hall, Ebriba II; Igbu, Ebriba II; Town Hall, Ogoda; Town Hall, Ihuakpa; Town Hall, Egbee
Akuku Toru	Manuel I	Bob Manuel Play Ground I; Bob Manuel Play Ground II; Owusara, Karibi/Dabiri; Walter Davies Quarters; Samuel Bob Manuel Square; Nbikiri; Alagbapiri; Owusara Water Front; Dabiri Square I; Dabiri Square II
Akuku Toru	Manuel II	Quakers Gate; Peter's Gate; Davies Manuel Quarters; Johnbulls Gate I; Johnbulls Gate II; Irogbolari Polo/Obazi Gate, Willamas Manuel; Francis Obazi I; Francis Obazi II; Thom Manuel's Gate; Oruamabo Manuel's Gate; Asemebo's Gate; Aberenge Gate
Akuku Toru	Manuel III	Black Duke Hall I; Black Duke Hall II; Okolo-Bio, Black Duke; Akuku-Toru, Black Duke; Douglas Compound I; Douglas Compound II; Douglas Compound III; B. C. M. School Abonnema; Douglas Okolobio I; Douglas Okolobio II; G. B. O.
Akuku Toru	Briggs I	Onubio Briggs Compound; Akuku-Toru Brigg's Compound; Akiala, E Square, Main Briggs I; Ikate Gate, Main Briggs II; Onubio, Benibi Briggs; Onubio, Joe Briggs, Quarters; Akialama Square, Tom Briggs Qtrs.; Captain Square; Akwamine Ekine; Ikata's Gate, Stephen/Omi; Asingamabia Gate
Akuku Toru	Briggs II	Alabraba Polo, Main Albraba I; Alabraba Polo, Main Albraba II; Alabraba Polo, Ngogo Alabraba III; Ajuka Gate, Ajuku Qtrs.; Membree Polo, Main Memebree; Membree Polo, Memebree; Membree Polo, John Membree; Somiari's Gate; Suku's Gate Suku Square I; Suku's Gate Suku Square II; Ichi Square; Anabraba Water Front
Akuku Toru	Briggs III	Nyemoni, Briggs Qtrs, Awoye Briggs Qtrs.; Cyclops Compound, Cyclops; Cyclops Compound, Kaiser/Joh Nson I; Cyclops Compound Asinfama Bia II; Cyclops Compound Agbani Qtrs.; Bestman Compound, Main Bestman; Bestman Polo; R. C. M. School, Abonnema, Benjamin Bestman Qters; Duein-Ala Polo; Erise Polo; Duein- Ala Square
Akuku Toru	Georgewill I	Georgewill Play Ground, Main Georgewill; Otaji Square; Georgewill Compound, Akpana; Ofbortubo Gate, John Georgewill Qtrs.; Igbigkuno Gate, Alex Georgewill; Datema's Gate, Dateman's Qtrs; Nengia's Gate; Akpanah Residence; Obene Akpana Square
Akuku Toru	Georgewill II	Kala Akpana Hall; Granville Compound, Alalibo I; Granville Compound, Alalibo II; Granville Okolobio; Pedro's Compound Benibo; Pedro's Compound Dokubo; Owuasawo Hall; Akuku-Toru, Granville Akuku-Toru
Akuku Toru	Georgwill III	Romeo's Gate, Remeo's Compound; Fyneface Square I; Fyneface Square II; Boyle's Gate, Boyle's Compound; Kala Ogumabiri, Ajaka's Comp.; Kalaotaji Hall, Omoni/Opuminiji; Ajaka Water Front; Ajaka Water Side
Akuku Toru	Jack I	Tubofia Gate Tubofia I; Tubofia Gate Tubofia II; Boto's Gate; Opu-Yibo Square I; Opu-Yibo Square II; Kabiri Botoye Gate, Tubofia II; Gabriel's Gate
Akuku Toru	Jack II	Iju Square, Mainjack; Oba Square, Oba Karibo I; Oba Square, Oba Karibo II; Eferebo Square, Reuben; Akoko Compound, Reuben; Akoko Compound; Krukrubo; Iju Square, Oruguta; Captain Angiya Gate, Captain Jack/Angiya; Oguru Gate, Oguru/Lawson; Lawson Gate
Akuku Toru	Jack III	Young Jack Gate, Kio Young; Joe Jack Gate; Kala Dokved's Square, Jim Jack; Mark Young Jack Gate; Kala Dokubo Memorial Hall, Kala Dokubo Main; Kala Dokubo Square Dabiri/Alalibo; Young Jack Water Front; Iwuoma Town Square; Sumer Ville Farm Square I; Anthens Ville Square I; Sumner Ville Farm Square II; Kala Dokubo's Gate; Behind Kala Dokubo Memorial Hall Sukuta
Akuku Toru	Alise Group	Nyemoni School, Abonnema, Briggs New Layout; Nyemoni School, Abonnema; Abuakiri, Abonnema Housing Estate; Erisekiri, Lelekiri/ Erisekiri/ Ablekiri; Imokolo, Imokolo/Akparakiri; Glady Square; Abonnema Housing Estate; New Layout Square, Briggs
Akuku Toru	Obonoma	Obonoma I; Obonoma II; Obonoma III; Agu Obonoma I; Agu Obonoma II; Obulagbulo, Obonoma; Ebema Boko, Obonoma; Gbulagbulo, Obonoma; Oyinke, Obonoma; Minji/Boko, Obonoma
Akuku Toru	Kula I	Comm. Sec. School Kula, Iwokpo I; Comm. Sec. School Kula, Alakukpo; Comm. Sec. School Kula, Obukpo; Comm. Sec. School Kula, Brownkpo; Comm. Sec. School Kula, Elekikpo; State School Kula, Alalubo Kpo; State School Kula Ibani Kpo I; State School Kula Ibani Kpo II; State School Kula Idekpo; Oko Polo; State School II, Sukubo/Dan Kpo; Ngugua/Opusube; Sara Square, Sara Polo I; Sara Polo II Behind Sara Square; Oko Polo II
Akuku Toru	Kula II	Ibiapu Ama, Mize Kiri; Adumuama; Elijah Kiri; Ababoko/Onongila/Pinarukiri; Aguda Kiri/Edikiri; Kilamasiri/Gold Coast; Nangwoama I; Nangwoama II; Aboyefa Kiri; Seria Kiri; Offoboko; Oluama; Newtown, Atkisonkiri; Free Town
Akuku Toru	North/South Group	Council Hall, Idama; Darama, Idama; Ekulama, Idama; Govt. Sec. Sch Idama; Okio Idama; Boye Polo Soku; Ekineama I, Soku; Soku Central, Soku I; Soku Central, Soku II; Opupolo, Soku; Kala Bama Soku; Ekineama II, Soku; Piri Toru Sarama, Soku; New Site, Soku; Agame Mission, Soku; Opukiri/ Kalakiri Soku; Elem Samgama; Oru Sangama/ Kampala; Opububekiri, Elem Sangama; Iwoama, Elem Sangama; Tuboitemea, Elem Sangama; Kuloye/Gonikon Elem Sangama; Lower & Upper Abissa; Opua Bissa; Central Abissa; Angalabio, Abissa; Obokofia. Elem Sangama; Open Space, Abissa I; Open Space, Abissa II; Open Space, Abissa III; Open Space, Abissa IV; Obokofia, Elem Sangama I; Obokofia, Elem Sangama II; Obokofia, Elem Sangama III; Obokofia, Elem Sangama IV; State School Hall, Soku I; State School Hall, Soku II
Andoni	Ngo Town	Saini Compound, Square; Compound Square, Harry Obiaja Saini; Egweoke Compound Square; Mkpate Ukontayi Compound Square; Egwewe Compound Square; Egwe Ukontayi Square; Ayama Ngo Village Square; Egwe Aja Compound Square; Ukaya Village Square; Agbuku Village Square I; Okwawo Village Square, Egwele /Egweokpan; Inyong Oron Village Square; Ibotinya Bong Square; Egwe Asuk Square; Mbabo Compound Square; Ogwenaja Compound Square; Ogboro Village Square; Agbuku Village Square II; Okuruket/Nteiji/Bara Comp. Square; Compound Square, Ereforokuma; Mbaikot Square; Agbuku Village Square III
Andoni	Unyen Gala	C. P. S. Unyengala; Agana Village Square; Okama Village Square; Echirichon Village Square Unyengala; Isiobozen Village Square; Egwede Village Square; Ayama Agana Village Square; Okpangwung/Ituro Village Square Ayama Agana; C. P. S. Oronija; Okwoke Village Square; C. P. S. Akaradija; Akaradi/Otogwu Village Square; Village Square, Amaekpirikpo-Akaradi; Inomo-Ukotije Village Square; Anyamaboko Village Square
Andoni	Agwut-Obolo	Alama Village Square; Iwoma Village Square; Dema Town Hall; Isiama Village Square; Omenuko/Otuko Village Square; Samanga Village Square; Isiokwan Obolo Village Square I; Emenudong Town Square; Oturuba Village Square; Okokiri-Edidim Village Square; Ama Ibama Village Square; Ilotombi Town Square; Ogwuinonu Village Square; Ukotunin Village Square; C. P. S. Muma, Lek-Okpon-Ile; C. P. S. Oyorokoto; Isiokwan Obolo Village Square II; C. P. S. Okokiri, Obolo; Egweek Isiokop Village Square; Emenudong Field Square; Asiriyork Village Square
Andoni	Ekede	Otuokorolo; Otudong Village Square; C. P. S. Okoloile; C. P. S. Ayama; C. P. S. Ebukuma; Ebon Edekile Village Square; C. P. S. Ayama Ekede; C. P. S. Ekede; Ama Ugbana Town Hall; Otuoso Village Square; Otiga Village Square; Ama Ubulom Village Square; Gomkiri Village Square; Ebukuma Ija Village Square; Isijon Inyon Ata; Inyase Square; Ama Renner Village Square; Otuokpu Rukpu
Andoni	Ikuru Town	C. P. S. Ikuru Town, Okama/Ayama; Ebon Akpon Village Square; Village Square, Udung Uwu; Okoroiko Village Square; Asukoyet Ija; Uko Efeek; C. P. S. Agbama; Otuoyo Village Square; Otuokporo Village Square; C. P. S. Asuk Oyet Ile; C. P. S. Okoroboile; Chiemeluk Village Square; Udung Compound Square; Ika Anya Compound Square; Aaron Compound Square; Jones Compound Square; Opuwari Square; Urombo Village Square; Ama Udo Compound Square
Andoni	Unyeada I	C. P. S. II Unyeada, Otuo Compound; Oyet Ile Square; Otuibok Compound Play Ground; Etekan Village Square; Amaekpu Village Square; Galiee Village Square; Ama Utono Square; Iyoba Village Square
Andoni	Unyeada II	Epellema Village Square; Inyonchicha Village Square; Okama/ Polokiri Village Square; Dema/Otunria Village Square; Dema Village Square I; Otuafu Village Square; Ama Gabriel Village Square; Agbadam Village Square; Dema Village Square II; Otuokponka Village Square; Isiodum Village Square; Okponile Village Square; Ofonkirika Village Square; Okwanjijor Village Square; Amanjijor Village Square; C. P. S. Egbormung; Oloma Village Square; Otuama Village Square
Andoni	Samanga	C. P. S. Ajakajak; C. P. S. Ibotirem; Otuirem Village Square; C. P. S. Samanga; Udung Amaiyo Square; Joshua Village Square, Udungama; Nkanlek Square, Ajakajak; Isiobiama Village Square, Samanga; Ogbonte Square
Andoni	Asarama	C. P. S. Asarama, Egwewaye; C. P. S. Asarama, Egweidake; Asuk-Okpon/Iranti Square; Okama Square; Egwebe Village Square; Asalakiri Village Square; G. S. S. Asarama, Utibi Otuoron/Dimama; G. S. S. Asarama, Ataijong/Dimama; C. P. S. Egendem; Esuku Village Square; Egendem Village Square; C. P. S. Inyonorong; Ebon Ukpuru Village Square; Otuadum Village Square; C. P. S. Iwoma; C. P. S. Iwoma, Ataejit; C. P. S. Asarama Ija I; Ejitiwoma Village Square; Awoh Village Square; Isala/Amaete/Aja Square; Irikana/Eyo Square; C. P. S. Asarama Ija II
Andoni	Ataba I	Ntegun/Usende Village Square; Obia/Ofiama Village Square; Ngbrigbo/Egweaja Village Square; Ogbologugo/Emenudong Compound Square; Ogbolo Compound Square; Egwe Ituk Square; Njah/Otuafa Village Square; Ekwan/Ebonuwo Ekeren, Village Square; Egwe Agari Compound Square; Agbakoroma T/Square; Etewu/Ntitara/Ebon, Village Square; Oguiyaja/Okuka/Otudim, Village Square
Andoni	Ataba II	Egwe Isiyork/Okama Village Square; Egwebe Village Square, Ibot-Mgbe; Egweaba/Ijon Esosok Village Square; Osot Ogile I Village Square; Iragunima Square/Emenakani Village Square; Iwowari I/Emenokwan Village Square; Iwowari II/Ibot-Ama/Okobom Village Square; Isita/Ama Ubong Village Square; Osot-Ogile II/Isijoron Village Square
Asari-Toru	Buguma South	Suku George Compound; Maingeorge Memorial Hall; Opuamee Ngoaa Square; Jim George Compound I; Jim George Compound II; Jim George Compound III; Awo/Ngo Square; Oguru/ Opuoyibo; Oguru/Opuoyibo, Olu Bite; Obene Square; Fenibo Polo Square; Victor Square; Main George Memorial Hall I; Main George Memorial Hall II; Tom-Tom George Polo, Hutton I; Tom George Compound, Hutton II; Okoma Square; Williams Square; Ogoloye Fubara Square; George Compound, Atatta; Ombu Compound; Sokari Polo; Oku Polo
Asari-Toru	Buguma South East	Lawson Polo; Lawson Polo Harrison Jim; Lawson Polo Awo Polo; Ibiama Polo; Lawson Memorial Hall, Fred Ibama; Nifeipiri Memorial Hall; Amakuro Polo, Suku; Egile Memorial Hall; Batubo Memorial Hall I; Butubo Memorial Hall II; Butubo Memorial Hall III; Baptist State School, Akidy; Dateme Memorial School I; Dateme Memorial School II; Opuda; Ayante
Asari-Toru	Buguma East I	Young Arney Memorial Hall I; Young Arney Memorial Hall II; Douglas Memorial Hall, Douglas Polo; Young Arney Hall, Awubite; Douglas Memorial Hall, Jenewari; Mac-Jaja Memorial Hall, Main Mac-Jaja I; Mac-Jaja Memorial Hall, Main Mac-Jaja II; Mac-Jaja Memorial Hall, Main Mac-Jaja III; Kiene Memorial Hall I; Kiene Memorial Hall II; Mac-Jaja Memorial Hall, Mac-Jaja; Ogo Polo; Opukio, Willie Polo; Ogo Polo, Harrison; Abbey Compound, Numbere; Dagogo's Gate Dagogo Polo; Owuso Polo; Daboye/ Dokubo Compound; Pepple Memorial Hall; Ojuka Polo; Okorosa Polo; Ejimofor Gate I; Ejimofor Gate II; Theophilus/Oberi, Abbey; Oribo Square, Oribo Compound; Oribo Compound Idialafiri Square; Tekewari Square, Ibra Oforinima
Asari-Toru	Buguma East II	Pankin Compound; Ediye-Kio Compound, Pankin; Braide Compound; Idoniboye-Obu Polo I; Idoniboye-Obu Polo II; Idoniboye-Obu Polo III; Ikiribo Compound; Taloy; Kalabari National College, Douglas II; Berry Compound; Ikrikota Omuaro Square, Genester
Asari-Toru	Buguma South West	Eferebo Compound I; Eferebo Compound II; Warmate, James/Alafa-Ageorge; Warmate, Daboye Osi; Johnbull Compound, Ogobu/Dabiri I; Johnbull Compound, Ogobu/Dabiri II; Johnbull Compound, Well/Okpara I; Johnbull Compound, Well/Okpara II; Johnbull Compound, Aberenge I; Johnbull Compound, Aberenge II
Asari-Toru	Buguma North East	Ekine Polo, Big Fowl; Soberekon, Big Fowl; Tariah Memorial Hall I; Tariah Memorial Hall II; Tariah Memorial Hall III; Barnago Compound; Orupumbus Compound; Kcc Buguma; Isokariari Compound I; Isokariari Compound II; Isokariari Compound III; Orupumbu Compound; Isokariari Compound IV
Asari-Toru	Buguma West	Fred Horsefall Compound I; Fred Horsefall Compound II; Fred Horsefall Compound III; Kenikuro; Main Horsefall; Main Horsefall, Neneye; Tengite Benibo; Akibanigo Gate; Cotterell Compound I; Cotterell Compound II; Kaizer Gate; Abo Gate, Orubia/Abo; Obazi Gate; Obazi Gate, Nyemoniba; Fred Horsefall Compound
Asari-Toru	Buguma North West I	Charles Lane, Owi Tubo; Ibila Square; Donald Square I; Donald Square II; Omoni Gate; Akoko Square, Johnson/ Cheetam; Owukori Square, Ebenezer I; Owukori Square, Ebenezer II; Jackreece Memorial Hall; Seleye Fubara I; Seleye Fubara II; Richard Square; Sokari Gate; Alele Layout/ Kuruye Alele; Ekine Gate, Igonibo
Asari-Toru	Buguma North West II	West Memorial Hall I; West Memorial Hall II; West Compound, Tom West I; West Compound - Tom West II; West Compound - Tom West III; Tobin West I; Tobin West II; Chetam West; William West Compound; John West Square; Orika Dibia Memorial Hall I; Orika Dibia Memorial Hall II; St. Michael School Buguma - David West; Alake-Idiama Compound; Lily West Compound; West Compound - Diamoma Gate; West Compound - Scent West
Asari-Toru	Buguma East West	Atiegoba Memorial Hall I; Atiegoba Memorial Hall II; Atiegoba Memorial Hall III; Atiegoba Memorial Hall IV; Atiegoba Memorial Hall V; Atiegoba Memorial Hall VI; Oruadiri Square I; Oruadiri Square II; Tomi Keimieye I; Tomi Keimieye II
Asari-Toru	Isia Group I	Ogbulule Compound I; Ogbulule Compound II; Council Hall, Dappa Polo I; Council Hall, Dappa Polo II; Council Hall, Dappa Polo III; Council Hall, Benibo Kala Osunji I; Council Hall, Benibo Kala Osunji II; Thompson Polo; Ogbulubo Polo; Akubu Polo; Asawo Square I; Asawo Square II; Seleya Compound I; Seleya Compound II; Kala- Abarama; Ifoko Town Hall, Lower Southern Ifoko I; Ifoko Town Hall, Lower Southern Ifoko II; Ifoko Town Hall, Upper Southern Ifoko III; Ifoko Town Hall, Upper Southern Ifoko IV; Elem Ifoko I; Elem Ifoko II; Okpo Town Hall; Ilelema Town Hall; Town Hall Tema; Town Hall Tema Amasa I; Town Hall Tema Amasa II; Town Square, Oporoma South; Town Square, Oporoma South I; Town Square, Oporoma South II; Gbobo Polo; Illelema Hall, Iselema Gate
Asari-Toru	Isia Group II	Egwere Memorial Hall; Egwere Memorial Hall, Opuwariboko I; Egwere Memorial Hall, Opuwariboko II; Iga Compound; Ogbo Compound, Oyibo; Ogbo Compound; Orungo Compound; Fisina Compound; Odio Compound; Ngo Compound; Town Hall, Sama I; Town Hall, Sama II; Ido Town Hall, Esukku Polo
Asari-Toru	West Central Group	Opukiri Main Hall; Eferebo; Eferebo Polo; Town Square, Krakrama I; Town Square, Krakrama II; Town Square, Krakrama III; Kulolo/Ono No, Krakrama; Elem Krakrama; Akpa Polo, Angulama; Mission Polo, Angulama; Ojobodo, Angulama; Pere Polo; Omoni Polo, Angulama; State School, Minama I; State School, Minama II; State School Sangama; Town Square Omekwe Tariama; Town Square, Omekwe Ama; Jenewari Gate, Angulama; Ibelema Polo; Oru Polosquare, Minama; State School, Angulama; Ononuji, Krakrama; Ainama, Krakrama
Bonny	Oro-Igwe	Coal Beach; Women's Hall, Old Consolate/Allison Area; Open Space, Madupolo I & II; Open Space, Madupolo III; Compound Square, Ojuebe; Ibanigo Town Hall; Post Office, Open Space; Allison Area, Open Space
Bonny	Court/ Ada Allison	Compound Square, Allison Opuweri; Compound Square, Ikugba; Old Market Square; Compound Square, Igoni Polo; Health Center Open Space, New Market/Sonimite; Dan-Jumbo Compound Square, Peoples Bank
Bonny	Orosiriri	Compound Square, Perekule; Boyle Memorial School Compoiund, Orosikiri I; Waribanni Compound Square Orosikiri III; Mercy Inn Open Space, Agana; Bishop Dimeri Open Space, Ayambo; Industrial Unit Open Space, Ngerebo
Bonny	New Layout	Govt. School Compound, Park/Npa/Pipeline; Central School Compound, New Layout; Shell Gate; New Jerusalem Open Space; L. N. G. Pipelne New Bonny
Bonny	Finima	Dupuyo Finima Town; Brown Wari's Town Hall; Tobin Wari's Town Hall; Attoni Wari Town Hall; L. N. G. Gate, Old Finima; Rai Gate Open Space; Vill Square, Ajokolo; Compound Square, Bariaco; Town Square, Agaja; Town Hall, Owubibi; Open Space. Light House; Open Space, Finitasingi; Old Finima, L. N. G. Gate
Bonny	Abalamabie	Village Square, Akiama; Village Square, Oguede/Coconut Estate; Ibrahim Hart / Chap Jumbo, C. P. S. Abalamabie; Open Space, Long John; Village Square, Iwowari; Village Square Allison, Woji/Jamica; Village Square, Nganaka; Open Space, Oguede; Village Square Ifoko/Ifoko/Poropaka
Bonny	Dema Abbey	C. P. S. Dema School Square; Village Square, George Ama; Village Square, Banigo; Village Square, Brinye Ama; Village Square, Mieorubo; Village Square, Mumakiri; Egelebie Village Square / Gbotoma
Bonny	Dan Jumbo/ Beresiri	Village Square, Dan Jumbo Ama; Village Square, Beresiri; Village Square, Ishiloe Gono Jumbo; Village Square, Adonye Ama; Village Square, Green Iwoma I; School Hall, Green Iwoma II; Village Square, Ogbukupolo; Village Square, Opudumakiki; Village Square, Green Iwoma III; Town Hall. Ogbukupolo
Bonny	Nanabie	School Square, Nanabie; Village Square, Sinai; Village Square, Sobiekiri I; Village Square, Akpakpasu; Village Square, Pondomakiri; Village Square, Ererekiri; Village Square Halidayama; Village Square Henry Longjohn; Village Square, Jackmay Ama; Village Square, Otobie; Village Square, Cristiy Wilcox; Village Square, Eferewari; Village Square, Igwu Ama
Bonny	Oloma Ayaminima	Village Square, Fakpa I & II; Village Square, Alasakiri; Village Square, Burukiri; School Hall, Oloma; Village Square, Iloma; Village Square, Epelema; Village Square, Sangamabie; Village Square, Agbalama; Town Hall, Oloma
Bonny	Peterside	Peterside I, Cps Hall; Peterside II, Wilcox Opuwari Open Space; Iwoma, Iwoma Open Space; Fibiri, Village Square; Oruanga/Gbarama, Oruanga Village Square; Gbarama/Dagbadiri, Village Square
Bonny	Kalaibiama	School Hall, Kalaibiama I; School Hall, Kalaibiama II; School Hall, Kuruama; Open Space, Legekiri I & II; Village Square, Mbisu; Village Square, Ikurukiri; Village Square, Opukiri; Village Square, Agisibi; Village Square, Map-Foropama; Village Square, Ogbokukiri; Village Square, Abonema Fishing Port; Village Square, Kuku-Iwoama
Degema	Bakana I	India Yellowe Compound; Martyns Yellowe Compound I; Martyns Yellowe Compound II; Isaiah Yellowe Compound; Gabriel Yellowe Compound
Degema	Bakana II	Marion Braide Compound; Marion Braide Compound, Ebeneze/Akanibo/Dokibo; Charlie Braide Compound; Dappa Braide Compound
Degema	Bakana III	Lulu Braide Polo; Youngman Square; Jumbo Polo
Degema	Bakana IV	Main Braide Polo; Central Braide; Oko Braide, Lower Polo; Ngo Compound; Namasibi; Ekweboko; Sogules Compound, Alagba
Degema	Bakana V	Iboroma; Dokubo Polo, Iboroma; Taylor Polo, Iboroma; Robert Compound, Iboroma; Orlu Polo, Iboroma I & II; Okwudu Polo, Iboroma; Estate Field, Hosing Estate; New Site Square, Iboroma; Fouche Polo; Odome
Degema	Bakana VI	Davies Compound, Davies I & II; Davies Compound, Davies III & IV; Joe-Jim Compound; State School II Beal-Nut Pedro I & II; Duke Compound Hall, Amabibi; Ogi Don-Peoro Compound
Degema	Tombia I	Dick Compound Hall; Omubo Memorial Hall; Ngiangia Main Hall; Benibo Compound; Davies Memorial Hall; Fubara Square; Alalbo Compound
Degema	Tombia II	Town Hall, Ekpeye/Dokkubo/Awoye; Town Hall, Diki Ba I & II; Iwoso Compound; Okwu Polo Square; Balo Square
Degema	Tombia III	Abbey Memorial Hall; Agborubere Square; Ywca Nursery School, Igbikialabo/Korobo; Abbey Main Square; Ikiroma Main Hall; Omuso Square; Korubo Square; Suku Square
Degema	Tombia IV	Ikukiri Square; Somiari (Newssite); G. T. C. Field, Tombia; State School Filed (Newsite); Elem Tombia Square
Degema	Degema I	Consullate Filed, Dr-Farm/ Jnr Staff Qtrs/Court Bank; Customary Court; Model Primary School Field
Degema	Degema II	Ogbolo Hall Area; Ogururu Square; Okabi Hall; Uplo Okaw Hall; Akpolu Square; Olu Square; Obein Square; Udokpo Compound; Town Hall, Usiro I; Town Hall, Usiro II; Baptist Church, Oko Gidi; Iwo Memorial Hall, Ugela; Upoku Square; Utie- Atala Hall
Degema	Degema III	Ogbolo Compound; Usokun Town Hall, Abamina; Usokun Town Hall, Otobo/Usu Dowo; State School I, Utowo/Usu Dowo/Ogaji I; Ogaji Square; State School Filed, Okakiri
Degema	Obuama	Alabotubo Compound, Odibo/Youngman/Gillis/Samuel/Nnerom; State School Obuama, Benibo/Atuboinomor/Omeo/John; State School Obuama, Hooper/Jim; Ndu Compound; Agbakiri Square; Ngbetokuru Square; Sokari-Kiri I; Atuboinoma Compound; Sokari-Kiri II; State School Obuama, Kiri-War/Brown/Nise
Degema	Bukuma	Ayama Square; Krigbo Square; Ika Square, Agbulabulo I&II; Alaka Compound; Zion City Square; Okpunadike Square; Okpuruta Square; Onugulo Hall; Amkpa Square; State School Filed R/A-Elugbe
Degema	Ke/Old Bakana	State School Hall, Old Bakana; State School Hall Field, Old Bakana; State School Hall, Agbabiri; Orutubo Square; Amantan Gbolo I Village Hall; Amantan Gbolo II Village Hall; Odumala Square; Omini Square; Secondary Sch. Hall, Iwo-Polo New Site; Oruteme Square; Omoni Polo Hall; Biriya Square; Govt. Sec. Sch Hall, Salo; Benibo Square, Nayebenebo; Omonibo Square; Aginah Compound, Damiebi; Odubo Main Hall
Eleme	Alesa	Town Hall, Okori; Town Hall, Ngola Awulu; Open Space, Nnpc Refinery; Town Hall, Nda; Open Space, Mbuma Eta; Open Space, Ekongor; Open Space, Alueken; Town Hall, Obinikiken; Town Hall, Ngejelawa
Eleme	Alode	Town Hall, Alungwa; Open Space, Efere; Town Hall, Akaralu; Open Space, Acharama; Town Hall, Yorowa; Town Hall, Ekenkua; Open Space, Olua; Town Hall, Naaya; Open Space, Nnonoa Eta; Open Space, Oborle; Open Space, Ekekolor
Eleme	Ogale	Open Space, Okori; Town Hall, Aluebo; Open Space, Awala/Adama; Town Hall, Osaroluka; Town Hall, Echieta; Town Hall, Ekpangbala; Town Hall, Alueken; Open Space, Olele; Town Hall, Agbi
Eleme	Ebubu	Open Space, Panya; Town Hall, Egbara; Town Hall, Obiban/ Alukere; Town Hall, Alejor; Town Hall, Obolo; Open Space, Agbeta Camp/Ekonni; Town Hall, Egbalor/Eseeji; Town Hall, Agbeta; Open Space, Egbalor Camp; Open Space, Trailer Park
Eleme	Ekporo	Open Space, Eta; School Hall, I-A-Eta; Open Space, Eyimeta; Open Space, Alungelale
Eleme	Eteo	Town Hall, Chittey/Chu; Town Hall, Aluebo/Ejii; Open Space, Aken; Open Space, Tekara; School Hall, State School Eteo
Eleme	Onne	Open Space, Njuru Ogoloma; Open Space, Njinna Village Alejor Town; Open Space, N. P. A; Open Space, Nafcon Barrack; Town Hall, Alejor; Town Hall, Oso Eta Agbeta; Open Space, Nkpornwi Palace Road; Town Hall, Osoeta Ekara; Open Space, Olua, Ekara Town; Open Space, Mount Zion Church, Agbeta Town; Ogoloma Town Hall, Ogoloma; Open Space, Adamah Ogoloma, Nkpornwi Village
Eleme	Agbonchia	Town Hall, Ogologbaa; Town Hall, Njuru; Town Hall, Okoyaa; Town Hall, Alungwa; Wanja, (Wanja Wall); Open Space, Akpakpan/Ejire; Abian Hall, Olungwekee; Town Hall, Aluejor/Ngiamba; Town Hall, Okpa/Okole; Open Space, Obinikiken; Town Hall, Ngebate; Ngeto Hall, Ngeto; Ebere Hall, Ebere; Eta Okpa/Jike/Osaronke Open Space (Eta Okpa); Akpakpan/Oleya Estate Area Estate Open Square
Eleme	Akpajo	Town Hall, Nwidaa; Town Hall, Alalesa; Town Hall, Acharama; Town Hall, Ewika; Open Space, Nkporn
Eleme	Aleto	Open Space, Ebe-Ele; School Hall, Chapere; Goya Okoro Open Space, Chapere; Town Hall, Isiogu; Town Hall, Okerewa; Ewuu Hall, Ewuu; Open Space. Nnpc Estate; Nnpc School, School Hall; Open Space, Petro Chemicals; Town Hall, Egbe; Motor Park, Ngofa II; Town Hall, Ngofa I
Emohua	Ogbakiri I	Open Space, Okporowo East; Open Space, Okporowo West; Open Space, Okporowo Centrial; Open Space, Ahia Wokoma; Town Hall, Ahia Village; Community Hall, Mgbu Ofumini; Mgbu-Ofumini Village Hall; Town Hall, Rumuoro I; Rumuamah Hall, Rumuoro II; Rumuamah Hall, Rumuoro III; Rumu Kpaliku I Hall; Rumu Kpaliku II Hall; Rumu Kpaliku III Hall; Okporowo (North) Village Open Space; State School Classroom, Ahia II; Okogba Hall, Rumuokogba I; Okogba Hall, Rumuokogba II
Emohua	Ogbakiri II	Oduoha Village Open Space; Open Space, Mgbueleni I; Open Space, Mgbueleni East; Mgbueleni Hall; Open Space, Rumuegba Village I; Open Space, Rumuegba Village II; Open Space, Ikwukiri Village; Orah Hall, Rumuokani I; Open Space, Rumuokani II; Town Hall, Rumuokani III; Town Hall, Rumuada I; Town Hall, Rumuada II; Open Space, Mgbueleni Village; Open Space, Amangwu Village
Emohua	Emohua I	Oduoha Hall; Open Space, Oduoha Play Ground; Open Space, Alimini Village; School Hall, Elibrada I; Open Space, Elibrada II; Rumuihua Hall, Elibrada III; Open Space, Mgbumini; Rumuwichendu Hall, Isiodu Central; Rumu-Elenwo Hall, Rumu Akun De East; Open Space Rumu Kpalikwu, Rumuakunde West; Rumuikejor Hall, Rumuakunde Central I; Rumuikejor Hall, Rumuakunde Central II; Open Space Play Ground, Ogbodo; Weleke Hall I; Weleke Hall II; Orluwene Hall, Rumuikejor; Rumuogwugweli Hall, Ukeli
Emohua	Emohua II	Ogala Hall I; Ogala Hall II; Village Hall, Mgbuetor; Community Hall, Rumuoha I; City Hall, Rumuoha II; Open Space Play Ground, Eli Israel; Community Hall, Rumuche East; Community Hall, Ovokolo; Town Hall, Mgbuorji; Community Hall, Mgbuitanwo; Osi Hall; Community Hall, Ndata West V; Mgbo Hall, Village; U. P. E. Sec. Sch. Hall, Okwukwo Ejere; Community Hall II, Mgbuemeh; Mgbuemeh Hall I; Mgbuemeh Hall II; Ovokolo Hall I; Ovokolo Hall II; Abaka Hall; Abaka Hall / Akpa Abaka; Com. Hall, Ndata East I; Com. Hall, Ndata East II
Emohua	Obelle	Omuechi Hall; Town Hall, Mgbuetor; Open Space Play Ground Omuagiri; Obiri Egeonu Hall, Omuwoka I; Obiri Egeonu Hall, Omuwoka II; Town Hall, Omuwoke I; Open Space Play Ground, Umorila I; Open Space Play Ground, Umuagala; Open Space Play Ground, Umuodu/Omuiba; Open Space Play Ground, Umuiyoro/Agala; Omuokpu/Omuwinike Hall, Umuorila; Open Space Play Ground, Omuwoke II; Open Space, Omuikea
Emohua	Ibaa	Community Hall, Omuogbo; Community Hall, Ohanyim; Community Hall Umuagala; Community Hall Umuadie; Rumuikea Hall, Omuikea; Omukpokwa Hall; Community Hall, Omucholo; Community Hall, Mgbere; Community Hall, Omuobizu Elenwo; Open Space, Igwenyi Village; Open Space, Omkpoba Village; Community Hall, Ogbelegba; Woji Ewhor Hall, Omuobizu Elewo I; Woji Ewhor Hall, Omuobizu Elewo II; Omuisioha Hall
Emohua	Rundele	Civil Centre Hall, Mgbuolua; Open Space, Mgbuogbakiri; Open Space, Ukeli; Play Ground, Mgbuzi; Community Hall, Mgbuonu-Jezi; Ngbuodovisi Open Space; Town Hall, Mgbe; Omofo Open Space; Town Hall, Egamini; Community Hall, Agba-Ndele I; State School Classroom, Agba-Ndele II; Community Hall, Mgbu-Elia; Atata Hall, Orlunwor; Woke Hall, Mini-Ama
Emohua	Rumuekpe	Town Hall, Imogu I; Imogu Open Space II; Town Hall, Mgbodo; Town Hall, Omoviri; Town Hall, Omegwa; Town Hall Mgbuhie; Town Hall, Ekwuche; Community Hall, Ovelle-Oduoha; Town Hall, Ovelle-Rumuekpe I; Rumughor Hall, Ovelle-Rumuekpe II; Okpara Hall, Mgbueze I; Atuhuo Hall, Mgbueze II
Emohua	Elele Alimini	Women Hall, Omuokpirikwu East; Women Hall, Omuokpirikwu West I; Women Hall, Omuokpirikwu West II; Men Hall, Mgbuanyim; Omuorihuru Hall; Town Hall, Omuse I; Town Hall, Omuse II; Town Hall, Omuse III; Omuagara I Hall; Omuagara II Hall; Omueke Women Hall; Men Hall, Omeneta I; Omuohia Women Hall, Omuagara III; Omudike/Omuadi Amuadi Open Space; Open Space Play Ground, Omeneta II
Emohua	Omudioga/ Akpadu	School Hall, Apabu Central; Ajiri Hall, Ogbola; Open Space, Omumini; Ubeti Open Space; Mubu-Eko Open Space, Omuogum I; Mubu-Eko Open Space, Omuogum II; Mgbuoduku Open Space; Mgbuokuku Open Space; Omapu-Akpabu Hall; Omordu Hall; Isimgbu Open Space; Etitioha Village Hall; Omuabali Village Hall; S. S. II Classroom, Omuchiowaa; Imeoha Open Space; Omuoba Hall
Emohua	Ubimini	Akanu Open Space; Umueti Open Space; Umueduma Hall; Umuochiomo Hall; Umuara Hall; Umuali Hall; Ibom Hall; Umuama Hall; Umuagbida, Open Space; Umu Ikea Hall; Umuchiogbo Hall; Umueze Hall; Omuorukwo Hall
Emohua	Odegu I	Mgbu-Oda Hall, Rumuji; Wrestling Ground, Open Space Rumuji II; Community Hall, Irrimarugburu I; Oviri Orduve Hall, Irrimarugburu II; Ihunwo Hall, Mgbuatafa East; Town Hall, Ngbuatafa West; Mgbuamerikai, Open Space; Elekesoro Hall, Mgbuamerika I; Mgbuafafa Central, Town Hall; Mgbuoda Hall; Rumuozele Hall, Mgbuaja; Ovogo Town Hall, Ngbuogbakiri; Rumu-Okene Hall, Irrimaru-Gburu III
Emohua	Odegu II	Community Hall, Rumuchagwor; Mgbuama Open Space; Community Hall, Mgbuogizi; Rumuogbolo Hall; Rumuosachi Hall; Evekwu Central Open Space; Evekwu East, Open Space; Mgbuaja Open Space; Rumuodogo II, Open Space; Mgbu-Oda Hall; Iyadigi Ivadigi; Mgbu-Obakiri, Rumuewhor; Mgbuama II, Rumuewhor
Etche	Afara	Umugama/Umuokom; Umugama; Umuajala/Obi Ohuru; Umueze; Umukwurugwu; Umunweke; Umuodo; Umuecheagu; Umuojohie; Umunwuzi; Umuonyegbu; Umunwanyu; Obiochie; Umunwokoji; Okere/Nwoko; State School Afara; Umuoga; Umunmoro
Etche	Igbo I	Umuakuru/Edegelem; Okochie/Umulu; Umumwalozie/Umulu; Umuazu/Umualukpo/Umuasukpu; Umuogodo Imeh; Chokota; Ikewerengwo; Umuebulu; Alaoma/Ohanta; Onumiri Umuokwa; Aghata; Umuamechi
Etche	Igbo II	Chokocho I; Chokocho II State School; Chokocho III; Umunwantu Town Hall; Umuoga State School; Umuoga Village Square; Abara State School I; Abara State School II; Umunwankwo Square
Etche	Igbo III	Umuanyagu Town Hall; Umuanyagu /Umuochie; Umudi/Umuonchia/Mongo; Okomoko I/ Umuala; Okomoko II/ Umuonigwe; Okomoko III/ Village Centre; Okoroagu Village Square; Okoroagu Town Hall; Umuele Muma Okomoko; Umuanyagu/Umuobasi
Etche	Egwi/Opiro	Opiro Town Hall; Opiro State School/Water Side; Egwi Town Hall/Egwi State School; Omodagu; Umuo Kenyi Town Hall/Egwi Centre; Nwogu-Oluo Village Hall; Otamiri-Olu Village Hall/Onyia; Umuekoro Village Hall; Umunwada Village Hall; Palace Hall
Etche	Nihi	Umuoji/Umuoji Water Side; Umuaria; Umuworo/Aworo Water Side; Umuaria I; Owuzor; Umuokiri
Etche	Odufor	Otamiri Village Centre; Umukanukwu; Umuelem Town Hall; Umuobiri I; Umuobiri II; Umuobiri III; Obiri-Ochimba; Umu-Amanu/Umuokwara
Etche	Obibi/Akwukabi	Umuozuzu/Umueze/Umuogerm; Umuokom State School/ Achara; Ikpo/ Umuabali Town Hall; Umuode Village Square; Umuchoko Village Square; Umuola I & II State School; Akwukabi State School; Umuekwune Village Square; Akwukabi/Umuezibe I; Akwukabi/Umuezibe II; Ikem State School; Umuoluo
Etche	Obite	Umume/Umunawo I; Umunde/Umuezeukwu; Umuakwuru; Umusu/Umuogbu; Umuokerenkwo; Umuimeka
Etche	Okehi	Umugbaku Village Square/Umuota/Umugama; Umuomara Village Square/Umuowam Village Square; Amaekwune Village Square; Umuochomo/Umuwaro Village Square; Umuehejie State School/Obiawom Upe Okehi; Umukologa/ Umubatti; Onomato Town Hall/Umuezewa; Agbalu/Umugwu; Umugwaram Town Hall
Etche	Ulakwo	Umuokom; Okpodim; Akashimoche; Umundor; Umunkwe; Umuakuru I; Umuakuru II; Umunwanyanwu/ Umuobiri I; Umunwanyanwu/ Umuobiri II; Umuamabe I; Umuamabe II; Umuakaa I & II; Umuakaa III; Umunwuzi I; Umunwuzi II; Umuokwe/Umunwala I; Umuokwe/Umunwala II; Umuoloche; Amoka; Umuiku/Umuala; Umunnadi/Akuru
Etche	Akwa/Odogwa	Akwa I & II; Akwa I & II Umuisu; Akwa I & II Umuamadi; Umuedemoche/Umueze; Odagwa I & II; Umuokpo; Odagwa Imo/ Umuwordu; Umuanyimoche
Etche	Akpoku/Umuoye	Okomoko Akpoku State School; Umuaghara; Umuekwune State School; Umudike/Umudim/Umuode; Umuoye Central State School I; Umuoye Central State School II; Umuoye State School; Odogo/Umuodagu I; Odogo/Umuodagu II; Umuaganunu
Etche	Ndashi	Umuokom Village Central; Umudele; Umukweke/Umuogham/ Umuodeti; Umucham; Ngelehie/Umuokele; Egbelubi/Umuamala/Umuogor; Egbelubi/Umuamala; Ochie Palace C.; Umuobia Town Hall
Etche	Mba	Edolam Village Centre; Umuka Village Square; Umuachonwa Play Ground; Umuokowoche State School; Umuofor Square; Umuordu Square; Umuayara Play Ground; Umuocham /Okudu State School; Amaku State School I; Amaku State School II; Umunna Town Hall; Umumbiri Square; Umuaturu G. S. S.; Umuaturu U. P. E
Gokana	Bodo I	State School II Bodo; State School II Ke To I; State School II Ke To II; State School V Snikkpala Bara I; State School V Snikkpala Bara II; State School V Oobara I; Bodo City Secoddary School. Oobara II; Bodo City Secoddary School Eele-Lebara I; Bodo City Secoddary School Eele-Lebara II; Bodo City Secoddary School Giogo Koo; State School II Bodo, Giogo Baamu I; State School II Bodo, Giogo Baamu II; State School. II Bodo, Kekum Bona
Gokana	Bodo II	State School. I Bodo, Giogon Bank I; State School. I Bodo, Giogon Bank II; State School I, Gberedeela I; State School I, Bodo, Gberedeela II; Ndd Mission. Togbo Nwezor; Ndd Mission Giogon Kaani I; Ndd Mission Giogon Kaani II; State School I Bodo, Nwemuu I; State School I Bodo, Nwemuu II; State School I Bodo, Kozo I; State School I Bodo, Kozo II; State School I Bodo, Makiri I; State School I Bodo, Makiri II
Gokana	Bodo III	Saint Pius College, Kimana/Kizara I; Saint Pius College, Kimana/Kizara II; Saint Pius College, Baranwezor I; Saint Pius College, Baranwezor II; Saint Pius College, Barivigo I; Saint Pius College, Barivigo II; Saint Pius College, Togbor Bara; Saint Pius College, Giogonkpalator I; Saint Pius College, Giogonkpalator II; Saint Pius College, Tegu I; Saint Pius College, Tegu II; Saint Pius College, Giogosaa
Gokana	B-Dere	C. S. S. B-Dere, Giogon Kegbo I; C. S. S. B-Dere, Giogon Kegbo II; C. S. S. B-Dere, Giogon Sigalo; C. S. S. B-Dere, Giogon Simigia I; C. S. S. B-Dere, Giogon Simigia II; C. P. S. I B-Dere, Giogon Vopba; C. P. S. I B-Dere, Giogon Keegba; C. P. S. I B-Dere, Giogon Boobana; C. P. S. II B-Dere, Boobana Aabon I; C. P. S. II B-Dere, Boobana Aabon II; C. P. S. II B-Dere, Silaa Silaa; C. P. S. III B-Dere, Epva I; C. P. S. III B-Dere, Giogon Epva II; C. P. S. III B-Dere, Giogon Barana; C. P. S. III B-Dere, Giogon Kinaben; C. P. S. IV B-Dere, Giogon Bootegbo I; C. P. S. IV B-Dere, Togbo II; C. P. S. I B-Dere, Gion Chief Sabif Square; Kinaben
Gokana	K-Dere I	C. P. S. I K-Dere, Giogon Kaabon I; C. P. S. I K-Dere, Giogon Kaabon II; C. P. S. I K-Dere, Sisaa I; C. P. S. I K-Dere, Sisaa II; C. P. S. I K-Dere, Giogon Banagba I; C. P. S. I K-Dere, Giogon Banagba II; C. P. S. II K-Dere, Gosuu I; C. P. S. II K-Dere, Gosuu II; C. P. S. II K-Dere, Aabon I; C. P. S. II K-Dere, Aabon II; C. P. S. II K-Dere, Kporo; C. P. S. II K-Dere, Simii; Seaside Kpakolo's Compound
Gokana	K-Dere II	C. S. S. K-Dere II, Giogo Zeekpa I; C. S. S. K-Dere II, Giogo Zeekpa II; C. S. S. K-Dere II, Zizi/Nor I; C. S. S. K-Dere II, Zizi/Nor II; State School III K-Dere Giogon Luuzor I; State School III K-Dere Giogon Luuzor II; State School III K-Dere Koolo I; State School III K-Dere Koolo II; Gbarakpor's Compound Square Dere Polo
Gokana	Bomu I	State School I Bomu, Bogosa; State School I Bomu, Kuru Dona; State School I Bomu, Osaagote; State School I Bomu, Eregara; C. P. S. II Bomu, Koa-Aa I; C. P. S. II Bomu, Koa-Aa II; C. P. S. II Bomu, Zorgbe; C. P. S. II Bomu, Saagerenwa
Gokana	Bomu II	C. P. S. Bomu, Luuzor I; C. P. S. Bomu, Luuzor II; C. P. S. Bomu, Vidada; C. P. S. Bomu, Kuri I; C. P. S. Bomu, Kuri II; C. P. S. Bomu, Kpotogo; C. P. S. Bomu, Gio-Dorgba; C. P. S. Bomu, Gio-Gioor
Gokana	Kpor/Lewe/Gbe	State School Kpor, Aabon Kpor I; State School Kpor, Aabon Kpor II; State School Kpor, Aabon Kpor III; State School Kpor, Noma Bon I; State School Kpor, Noma Bon II; G. S. S. Kpor, Kegbom I; G. S. S. Kpor, Kegbom II; G. S. S. Kpor, Noma Bon III; C. P. S. Kpor, Giodeor; Council Quarters, Gion Legedu I; Council Quarters, Gion Legedu II; C. P. S. Gbe, Gbe I; C. P. S. Gbe, Gbe II; State School Lewe, Beeka Lewe I; State School Lewe, Beeka Lewe II; State School Lewe, Yorkonwa; State School Lewe, Aabon I; State School Lewe, Aabon II; State School Lewe, Gio Deeol; Apostolic Mission, Gio Ligodii; Apostolic Mission, Gio Zormiidom; Apostolic Mission, Gio Nwemu
Gokana	Mogho	C. S. S. Mogho, Gion/Bar/Nibia I; C. S. S. Mogho, Gion/Bar/Nibia II; C. S. S. Mogho, Giobar/Naabiradee; C. S. S. Mogho, Gio Aabon/Kegbo; C. S. S. I Mogho, Gion Teerabor; Community Primary School II, Gion Teerabor; Community Primary School Nwebara/Court; Community Primary School, Gion Nkue; Town Primary School I, Mogho, Gioguote
Gokana	Nweol/Gioko/Barako	C. P. S. I, Nwe-Ol, Giogon Yorgho; C. P. S. I, Nwe-Ol, Tegua; C. P. S. I, Nwe-Ol, Giogon Guru; C. P. S. I, Nwe-Ol, Giogonaabon; C. P. S. I, Inwe-Olgiogon Salari; Town Square, Giogon Gbom; Town Square, Giogon Kegbara; Giogon Wisdom I; Giogon Wisdom II; Menegbo Giogon Apo; Simkkpara Square; C. P. S. II Barako; C. P. S. II Gio-Bo-Ool; C. P. S. II Gionaa; C. P. S. II Gbara I; C. P. S. II Gbara II; C. P. S. II/Gio Aabon/Nwele-Nte; Market Square, Gio Koo I; Market Square, Gio Koo II; Gure Square, Gio Gure; Market Square, Gyoo Koo II; Gure Square, Gyoo Gure
Gokana	Biara I	C. P. S Biara, Gion Kaakiri I; C. P. S Biara, Gion Kaakiri II; C. P. S Biara, Gion Boobaraol I; C. P. S Biara, Gion Beanen; C. P. S Biara, Gion Ben; C. P. S Biara, Gion Nwezor; C. P. S. Biara, Gion Boobaraol II
Gokana	Derken/Deeyor/Nweribiara	Comm. Primary School I Deeyor/ Gion Veere I; Comm. Primary School I, Gion Veere II Deeyor; Comm. Primary School Gion Gboro I Deeyor; Comm. Primary School Gion Gboro II Deeyor; Comm. Primary Sch. Gion Gbara/Gagaa I; Comm. Primary Sch. Gion Gbara/Gagaa II; Comm. Primary Sch. Iiaabon/Kekara; Comm. Primary Sch. II, Gio Taboro I Nwebiara; Comm. Primary Sch. II, Gio Taboro II Nwebiara; C. P. S. Nwibiara, Kaabon; C. P. S. New Biara Booba-Ol; C. P. S. Monokpo Square, Nzi Wee Deeyor; Gberele Ogele Square, Buuna Deeyor; State School I Dekeen; State School I, Gio Simogho, Dekeen; St. Gabriel Catholic Mission, Kereboldaro; Apostolic Mission Deken, Lumene I; Apostolic Mission Deken, Lumeneii; C. A. C. Mission Gioaabon I; C. A. C. Mission Gioaabon II
Gokana	Yeghe II	C. S. S. Yeghe, Koro-Ue I; C. S. S. Yeghe, Koro-Ue II; Comm. Town Hall, Gaagaa I; Comm. Town Hall, Gaagaa II; State Sch. Yeghe Baragwanwate I; Comm. Town Hall Nukpor I; Comm. Town Hall Nukpor II; C. S. S. Kebara I; Beeke Square Beeke I; Beeke Square Beeke II; Kebera Town Square, Kebara II
Gokana	Yeghe I	C. P. S Bogho, Giogon Bank; C. P. S Bogho; C. Ps II Yeghe, Baranube I; C. Ps III Demue I; C. P. S Demue II; C. P. S Bua Yeghe, Nugbe I; C. P. S Bua Yeghe, Nugbe II; Maazi Square, Demue III; Looyaakoo, Nugbe/Gbobari
Gokana	Bera	C. S. S. Bera, Booka I; C. S. S. Bera, Booka II; C. S. S Bera, Saakoror I; C. S. S Bera, Saakoror II; C. P. S. I Bera, Kakiri I; C. P. S. I Bera, Kakiri II; C. P. S. I. Gioguru Kooro I; C. P. S. Giomu Bana; C. P. S. II Bera Gio Lezirade I; C. P. S. II Bera Gio Abe I; C. P. S. Iibera Togobo; Bera Town Hall, Abe II; C. P. S. I Bera Giadom I; C. P. S. I Bera, Gio Gurukooro II; C. P. S. I Bera Togobo II; C. P. S. I Bera Giadom II
Gokana	Biara II	C. P. S. II Biara. Luuzor; C. P. S. II Biara. Gion Zor Kooro; C. P. S. II Biara. Gion Boobara-Ol I; C. P. S. VI Biara Gionsugi I; C. P. S. VI Biara Gionsugi II; C. P. S. VI Biara Kenkum
Ikwerre	Isiokpo I	Adanta Village Centre, Isokpo; Upe Adanta, Isiokpo; Town Hall Adanta, Isiokpo; Ogbodo V. C. Isiokpo; Ogidere Hall Isiokpo; Orosi Village Hall Isiokpo; St. Paul's State School Ogbodo Isiokpo; Omueke Village Centre; St. Peter's School Omueke Isiokpo; Alikalankwu Hall Omueke Isiokpo; Azumini Village Centre Isiokpo; Azumini School Hall Isiokpo; Omu-Okon Village Hall Isiokpo
Ikwerre	Isiokpo II	Nkarahia Village Centre, Isiokpo II; St. Peter's Primary School Isiokpo II; S. S. Alimini Isiokpo II; Omuama Town Hall Isiokpo II/Omanwa Junction; Okpirikpi Town Hall Isiokpo; Okpirikpi Town Square Isiokpo; Agwara Town Hall Isiokpo; Mgbohuara Village; State School Alimini Isiokpo; Omu-Amadi Village Hall Isiokpo; Mgbo Play Ground Isiokpo; Aleru Village Hall
Ikwerre	Elele I	Omopo Village Centre, Elele; State School I Elele; C. P. M. New Area; C. P. M. Old Hall Elele; Omeneta/Mgbuigwe Elele; Omualikor Play Ground Elele; Enyinda Hall Elele; Omuawhor Play Ground; Omuiboh Village Centre Elele; Camp I Rubber Estate Elele; Camp II Rubber Estate Elele; Omumipuru Village Centre Elele; Mgbueken Village Centre Elele; Omukerenyi Village Centre Elele; Kpalukwu Village Centre Elele; State School III Obitti Elele; Omuohia/Omuhoda Elele; Omopo Hall Elele; Prison Farm Centre Elele; Omumipuru Town Hall Elele/Omumkparu
Ikwerre	Elele II	Army Sec. School Elele I/Govt. Army Mammy Market A; Army Sec. School Elele II/Govt. Army Secondary School B; State School II Elele; Omuoluma Village Centre Elele I; Omuoluma Village Centre Elele II; Mgbuobom Village Centre Elele; Estate Primary School Hall Elele; Omuse Village Centre Elele; State School IV Elele; Ovuah Village Centre Elele; Omuadi Village Centre Elele; Civil Centre Elele; N. C. O's Mess Area Elele; Mgbunla Compound Elele; Post Office Play Ground Elele; Palm Estate School Hall Elele
Ikwerre	Omerelu	Omele Village Centre, Omerelu; Omuchi Village Hall, Omerelu; Omotagbala Village Omerelu; Uborum Village Hall Omerelu; Umugwere Village Centre Omerelu; State School II Omerelu; Omuogamma Village Centre Omerelu; Omuodua Village Hall; Omellem Village Centre Omerelu; Omellem Town Hall Omerelu; Omuihie Village Centre Omerelu; Omuiti-Omuagwo; Omuamadi Village Hall Omerelu; Omuitu-Omuagwo; Station Play Ground Omerelu; Omuoto Gbula Town Square, Omerelu
Ikwerre	Apani	Umudiala Village Apani; C. S. S. I. Apani; State School Uborom Apani; State School Uturu Hall Apani; Umuanyamele Village Centre Apani; Umudagwa Village Centre Apani; Mgbuoha Village Centre Apani; Umukerenyi Village Square Apani; Umuwuamah/Umuazukwu Village Hall Apani; Umuachidike Village Hall Apani; Community Hall Apani; Umugwoha Village Centre Apani
Ikwerre	Umuanwa	Omute Play Ground, Umuanwa; Omuchinwo Village Centre, Omuanwa; Ogbasara Village Hall, Omuanwa; Omuagwu John Hall Omuanwa; Ubordu Village Hall Omuanwa; Omuwomini Town Hall Omuanwa; Omukwosi Town Hall Omuanwa; Omuolunwo Play Ground Omuanwa; Omuihita Village Hall Omuanwa; Omuedoronye Village Centre
Ikwerre	Ubima	Omueka Community Hall Ubima; Ucheabor Community Hall Ubima; Ahiaezi Town Square Ubima; Omuata Village Square Ubima; Omuordu Town Square Ubima; Omukabi Village Centre Ubima; Ngbuogba Village Hall Ubima; Akpohia Town Hall Ubima; Estate Primary School Hall I Ubima; Estate Primary School Hall II Ubima; Omuowhor Village Hall Ubima I; Omuordur Village Hall Ubima II; Imekpesu Town Ubima; Omuigwe Village Square Ubima; Ngbuelua Play Ground Ubima I; Ngbuelua Play Ground Ubima II
Ikwerre	Omagwa	Omuolo Community Hall; Omuikume Community Hall, Omagwa; St. Martin's School Omagwa; Central Primary School Agwawirie, Omagwa; Omuiketu Hall, Omagwa; C. P. S. Imogu, Omagwa; Imogu Town Hall, Omagwa; Omuchetu Village Hall, Omagwa; Omuduali Village Hall, Omagwa; Airport Primary School, Omagwa; Omuagubia Town Square, Omagwa; Agwuo/Awhua Omagwa; Omuobu B/F Village Hall, Omagwa; Airport Quarters IV, Omagwa
Ikwerre	Omademe/Ipo	State School Ipo Amacha; Umuchala/Ezogu Village Hall; Nnator Village Hall; State School I, Omunkwo; Omuchukwu I Hall; Omuowhor Village Square; Ipo Village Centre; Mguokiri Village Square; Omuaya/Omuotor Village Hall
Ikwerre	Ozuaha	Omuokwu Village Square, Ozuaha I; Omuokwu Village Square, Ozuaha II; Omanikere Village Square, Ozuaha; Omuota Village Square, Ozuaha; Omuosi Village Square, Ozuaha; Omuata Village Square, Ozuaha; State School II, Ozuaha I; State School II, Ozuaha II; Oma/Omakwuru Town Hall, Ozuaha
Ikwerre	Igwuruta	Omuodukwu Hall Igwuruta; St. Anthony School Hall, Igwuruta; State School Hall, Omuchi Igwuruta; Omuohia State School Hall Igwuruta; Omueke Town Hall Igwuruta; Central School, Igwuruta; C. P. S. Omunwei, Igwuruta; C. P. S. Omuoluta Igwuruta; Omuka Town Hall, Igwuruta.; C. P. S. Aro Camp Igwuruta; Igworuta C. S. S.; Mbuike Community Hall Igwuruta; Alimini Community Hall, Igwuruta; Omumah Town Hall, Igwuruta; Omusele Town Hall, Igwuruta I; Omusele Town Hall, Igwuruta II
Ikwerre	Aluu	Omuike Aluu; Omuoda Aluu; Omuahunwo Aluu; Omuchiolu Aluu; Omuoko Aluu; Omuigwe Aluu; Mbodo Aluu; Aluu Quarters Aluu; Omuihuechi Aluu; Omuokiri Aluu; Omuchukwu Aluu; Omuosa Aluu; Omuigwe New Layout Aluu; Omuchukwu Tank, Aluu Square
Khana	Bori	Motor Park; Cps II, Bori; Police Field, Bori; B. M. G. S. Field, Bori; C. P. S. Nortem; Upe School, Bori I; Upe School, Bori II; Eete-Ngbube; Taabaa Road Junction, Bori; Giadom Guest House Junction
Khana	Zaakpori	Luuko; Kekara; Luuyor; Yeekunu; Ikpani; Gborkiri; Kueyirate; Taezorgor; Eemi
Khana	Llueku/Nyokuru	Kogara; Ueyor; Buabaa; Bori; Zongor Yeghe; Nyoyagara; Katem; Korokoro; Banabaa I; Banabaa II; Nyogormmke; Zaa; Guh; Wiikue; Agbani I; Agbani II; Luudee; Buamene; Sigere; Seme; Gbara
Khana	Sogho	Eete Akporo; Eete Teka I; Eete Teka II; Eete Nuacha; Eete Luugue; Eete Barakani; Eete Burbara; Eete Nyorgbor I; Eete Nyorgbor II; Eete Deemi; Eete Aabue
Khana	Okwali	Buago Town Hall; Eete Luukue; Eete Taakula; Eete Nyokua I; Eete Nyokua; Eete Koro; Eete Aabuew; Eete Buagon; Eete Bekpaa; Eete Luumene; Eete Eete Tebana
Khana	Kaani	Eete Bekue; Eete. Gborkpara; Gboru Beneakpa; Eegbara; Aakaani; Kegbo; Terabo; Teyor; Barabor; Kegba; Emgbor I; Emgbor II; Pemaa; Gbenekuadum; Barakarawwa Gbor
Khana	Bargha	C. P. S. Bunu-Bangha; Eete Deetaewii; Eete Nyobe; Eeteda Bata; Eete Yeghe I; Eete Yeghe II; Eete Dumele I; Eete Dumele II; Eete Ekorokoro; Eete Yegara; Eete Koro; Eete Kere; Eete Zago; Eete Luuzor I; Eete Nyogui; Eete Luuzor II; Eete Baragbor; Eete Luugbor; Eete Taeke; Eete Bara; Eete Kabara; Eete Luukue; Eete Aabue; Eete Gbor
Khana	Taabaa	Eedu; Baraya; Teera-Ue; Junction; Korogbere; Bara-Kpong; Gure; Keor; Barakor; Saakoo; Barasaro; Baraloole; Zorkonbekue
Khana	Beeri	Eete Nyowii; Tezor; Eete Gui; Eete Luere; Eete Nyogor; Eete Deegor; Wiimaa; Eete Buemeneyor; Eete Saah; Eete Yor; Eete Lueri I
Khana	Bane	Deewii/College; Mae/Nyozogho; Ma-Or/Leba; Gbor/Lumene; Deh/Bara; Gbora; Bere; Eweh-Bara; Wiibaa; Kabara
Khana	Kono/Kwawa	Taa-Kwana; Dee-Eewa-Kwana; Yaaya; Luudua-Buan; Mana-Buan; Bara-Buau; Bara-Kono; Nyokuru-Kono; Bom-Kono; Wiinua-Kono; Nyomui-Kono; Bali-Nwambu Square; Mubom Buan Water Front; Gaezi Primary School
Khana	Wiiyaa Kara	Wiiyaakara; Eete Deede; Eete Gonwan; Eete Barasaga; Eete Bagara; Eete Keegbara; Eete Bara/Luubara; Eete Nyotem; Eete Teeh/Luubara; Eete Deemaake-Or; Eete Koroue-Pue; Eete Zorgoryor Pue; Eete Kaazor Pue; C. P. S. Gure; Dumewii Eete; Eete Kebae Gure
Khana	Boue	Tego Deekuru; Eepie; Kwakwaa; Nor Bana I; Nor Bana II; Koori; Beema; Luubale; Iboro; Iloolo; Luubakie; Kee-Maa; Kaabam; Ke-On; Beebana; Kegba; Luugara; Teebana; Teete
Khana	Uegwere	Eete Kurugha; Kato; Eete Eegwere; Eeyorbia; Eete Normaa; Eete Eelorlor; C. P. S. II Uegwere; Bara; Banghe; Eete Uekue II
Khana	Gwara/Kaa/Eeken	Eete Kaa; Kaa Motor Park; C. P. S. Kaa; Eete Beagu Eeken; Eeken; C. P. S Eeken; Eete Nyorgbor; Eete Bue-Mbea; Eete Kapnor; Luawu; Eete Kaakuoluawii; C. P. S. Luawii; Eete Leluu Gwara; Eete Koroyor Gwara; Eete Bien Gwara; C. P. S. Gwara; Taezorgho; Eete Nyowii Gwara; Eete Wiigamaa Gwara; Eete Laalaa; Eete Wiibara-Bien
Khana	Opuoko/Kalaoko	Eete Yomoi; Eete Eenwiilaba; Eete Zongor-Deh; C. P. S. Kalaoko I; C. P. S. Kalaoko II; Demui Kalaoko; Camp Site; Eete Nwiyor; Eete Buapari I; Gbara Opuoko; Eete Wiikue; Eetenuagha; Eete Daamii; Eete Buapari II; C. P. S. Luuwa; Eete Teoh Luuwa; C. P. S. Bianu; Eete Zongoryor, Bianu; Eete Gbam Bianu; Eete Bori-Opuoko; Eete Bupari III; Eete Gua-Luuwa; Eete Wiimui-Luuwa; Eete Luewii
Khana	Sii/Betem/Kbaabbe	Eete Betem I; Eete Betem II; Eete Nwiinua K-Baabe; Eete Kereke; C. P. S. Kani Baabe; C. P. S. I Sii; C. P. S. II Sii; Eete Kadera Sii; Eete Bara Sii; Eete Eebia Sii; Eete Korogbere Sii; Eete Korogbere; Eete Numaa Sii; Eete Nyogor Yeekunu; Eete Wiikap; C. P. S. I Betem
Khana	Baen/Kpean/Duburo	Eete Gake; Eete Gui; Eete Gba; Eete Nyowii; Eete Luuzue; C. P. S. Wiua Baen; Eete Luukpa; Eete Nyokuru; Eete Lumene; Eete Luudue; Eete Luutem; C. P. S. Kpaen I; C. P. S. Kpaen II; Eete Yorkiri I, Kpean; Eete Yokiri II; C. P. S. Tenama; C. P. S. Tera-Ue; Eete Luugah; Eete Sibara; Eete Bere; Nwidenu Town Hall; Lumene II (Deemuii)
Khana	Lorre/Luebe/Kpaa	Kpaa; Nyowii; Yae; Daen I; Daen II; Daen III; Kegbam; Nyomana I; Nyomana II; Kirika; Korogua; Gortem; Barataa I; Barataa II; Koro; Zongobari; Lua; Eepee
Obio/Akpor	Rumuodara	Mgbuesilaru Okporo I; Mgbuesilaru Okporo II; Agip Quarters Okporo; State School Iriebe I; State School Iriebe II; Naval Quarters Okporo I; Naval Quarters Okporo II; Eliowhani Play Ground Okporo; Rumuelewa Play Ground Okporo; Rumuodara Play Ground I; Rumuodara Play Ground II; Rumuodara/Rumucheta; Rumuodara/Rumuonukem; Chukwuodara/Obiri
Obio/Akpor	Rumuokwu (2b)	C. P. S. Atali I; C. P. S. Atali II; C. P. S. Atali III; C. P. S. Atali IV; All Saints State School Rumukwurusi (Shell Residential Area Rumukwurusi I); All Saints State School Rumukwurusi (Shell Residential Area Rumukwurusi II); All Saints State School Rumukwurusi III (Shell Residential Area Rumukwurusi III); State School, Rumukwurusi I; State School, Rumukwurusi II; Saint John's School Rumukwurusi I; Saint John's School Rumukwurusi II; Saint John's School Rumukwurusi III; Rumuchioku; U. P. E. School; Rumuwekerebe/Rumuokwa; Ngbuori; Rumuorianwo I; Rumuorianwo II
Obio/Akpor	Rumuodomaya (3a)	Rukpakwadima, Rumuodomaya; Rukpakwadima Farm, Rumuodomaya; Town Hall Rumuodomaya I; Town Hall Rumuodomaya II; Town Hall Rumuodomaya III; Omachi Square Rumuodomaya; Amadi Hall Rumuodomaya; Egonwo Hall Rumuodomaya; Rumunaya Hall Rumuodomaya; Shell Barracks Rumuobiakani I; Shell Barracks Rumuobiakani II; State Primary School Rumuobiakani I; State Primary School Rumuobiakani II; State Primary School Rumuobiakani III; Housing Estate Rumuobiakani I; Housing Estate Rumuobiakani II; Community Primary School Rumuobiakani; Queen's Palace Rumuobiakani; Geodeltic Road Rumuobiakani; Rumuobuechi/ Rumuobiakani
Obio/Akpor	Elelenwo (3b)	Rumuodunwere, Elelewon I; Rumuodunwere, Elelenwo II; Rumuodunwere, Elelenwo III; Rumuodunwere, Elelenwo IV; A. C. M. G. S. Elelenwo; Rumueheleze Elelewon; Briston Estate Elelenwo I; Briston Estate Elelenwo II; Rumuodani Elelenwo; Rumuodikereke Elelenwo; Rumuamadi Elelenwo I; Rumuamadi Elelenwo II; Rumuamadi Elelenwo III; Eluke Elele Market Square Elelenwo; Rumuegumegu Obiri John Nwakohu, Elelenwo; Rumuegumegu Obiri Risi Elelenwo; Rumuegumegu Elelenwo I; Rumuegumegu Elelenwo II; Rumuegumegu Elelenwo III; Rumuegumegu, Obiri Worlu
Obio/Akpor	Worji	Worji Estate; Worji Town Hall I; Worji Town Hall II; Worji Town Hall III; Okporo Eke; Mini Worji; Amadi Odum Hall; State School Oro-Evo, Rumurolu I; State School Oro-Evo, Rumurolu II; State School Oro-Evo, Rumurolu III; Hosing Estate, Rumuibekwe; Town Hall Rumuibekwe; Davidnna Hall, Rumuogba; Obio Council, Rumuogba I; Obio Council, Rumuogba II; Obio Council, Rumuogba III; Eliada's Hall, Rumuogba; Otiaji Rumuogba; Odinigba Town Hall(Slaughter, Oginigba); U. P. E. Oginigba; C. P. S. Oginigba I; C. P. S. Oginigba II
Obio/Akpor	Rumuokoro	Play Ground, Ruokparulusi I; Play Ground, Eligbolo; Eliogbolo Ruokparulusi; Ezinwho Hall Ruokparulusi; Amadi Hall Ruokparulusi; Awalama Rumuokoro; Army Child. School Rumuokoro I; Army Child. School Rumuokoro II; Army Child. School Rumuokoro III; Army Child. School Rumuokoro IV; Elieke; C. P. S. Okoro-Odo; Fed. Govt. College; A. C. Bobmanuel Estate, Rumuagholu; Nworgu Estate Rumuagholu; Rumuagholu Town Hall; Njiowhor Hall, Rumuagholu; Chife Ogbonna Hall, Rumuagholu; Akwozu Hall, Rumuagholu; Anya Water Side, Rumuagholu; C. S. S. Okoro-Odo Rumuagholu; Rumu Chukwu Hallrumuagholu; Army Children School, Rumuokoro
Obio/Akpor	Rumuomasi	State School I, Rumuomasi I; State School I, Rumuomasi II; State School II, Rumuomasi I; State School II, Rumuomasi II; State School III, Rumuomasi; Rumuinyawa Rumuomasi; Rumuchukwu Rumuomasi; Rumnezeolu Rumuomasi I; Rumnezeolu Rumuomasi II; Rumnezeolu Rumuomasi III; Rumnezeolu Rumuomasi IV; Rumuanyaolu Rumuomasi; Rumuolukwu Town Square I; Rumuolukwu Town Square II; State School I Town Hall; State School II Town Hall; State School III Town Hall; Airforce Base, Rumuomasi
Obio/Akpor	Rumueme (7a)	Oro-Ekpo, Rumuepiri Kom I; Oro-Ekpo, Rumuepiri Kom II; Oro-Ekpo, Rumuepiri Kom III; Onyinwere Rumuepiri Kom; Ichenwo Rumuepiri Kom; Apaogodo Rumuepiri Kom; Rumuowabia Town Hall; Mgbuike I Town Hall; Mgbuike II Town Hall; Mgbuike III Town Hall; Rumuwike Town Hall; Rumuwike Housing Centre; Eliparawon Town Hall; Eliparawon Open Space
Obio/Akpor	Rumueme (7b)	Fed. Housing Estate Rd I, Rumueme; Fed. Housing Estate Second Avenue; Fed. Housing Estate Road 24; Fed. Housing Estate 13/14 J. T.; Naval Barracks, Rumueme; Oro-Agbolu, Rumueme I; Oro-Agbolu, Rumueme II; Oro-Agbolu, Rumueme III; Oro-Akwor, Rumueme I; Oro-Akwor, Rumueme II; Oro-Akwor, Rumueme III; Oro-Akwor, Rumueme IV; G. G. S. S. Rumueme; Eligbam Rumueme I; Eligbam Rumueme II; Oro-Azi Rumueme I; Oro-Azi Rumueme II; Oro-Azi Rumueme III; Obiri Echem Rumueme; Rumuchida Rumueme; Oro-Owo Rumueme; Oro-Owo Rumueme I; Oro-Owo Rumueme II; Water Front Rumueme I; Water Front Rumueme II; Mgbuorazi Rumueme I; Mgbuorazi Rumueme II; Custom Barracks Rumueme; School Of Nursing Rumueme; Agip Housing Estate Rumueme I; Agip Housing Estate Rumueme II; Wobo Rumueme; Ndoni Central Gra Phase 11; Army Child School, Rumueme I; Army Child School, Rumueme II; Army Child School, Rumueme III
Obio/Akpor	Rumueme (7c)	C. P. S. Ayamaya, Rumueme; Rumuogna Rumueme; Ekana Village Rumueme; Rumukpakani Rumueme; Rumuchiolu Rumueme; Ibemeru Village Rumueme; Akwaka Village Rumueme; Oro-Ogologo Rumueme
Obio/Akpor	Rumuigbo (8a)	Rumueme I Play Ground; Rumueme II Play Ground; Cherub/Seraeria Hall; Rumuorosi Community Hall I; Rumuorosi Community Hall II; C. P. S. Rumuopara I; C. P. S. Rumuopara II; Kesiolu Community Hall; Rumuotogbo Community Hall; Rumuokwuroma Hall; Rumuhechiolu Hall I; Rumuhechiolu Hall II; Psychiatric Hospital, Rumuigbo; Worlu Chida Hall Rumuogbo; Civil Centre Hall Rumuigbo; Iboloji Hall Rumuigbo; Ariolu Hall Rumuigbo; Rummogologo Hall Rumuigbo; Egeonu Hall Rumuigbo; Mgbuike Hall Rumuigibo; Obiwelli Road T. Junction Rumugibo; Upe School Building, Nkpolu Rumuigbo I; Upe School Building, Nkpolu Rumuigbo II; Upe School Building, Nkpolu Rumuigbo III; Upe School Building, Nkpolu Rumuigbo IV; Town Hall Nkpolu Rumuigbo
Obio/Akpor	Rumukwuta (8b)	G. G. S. S. School Building Rumuokwuta I; G. G. S. S. School Building Rumuokwuta II; G. G. S. S. School Building Rumuokwuta III; Town Hall Rumuokwuta I; Town Hall Rumuokwuta II; Imb Est-Ta Town Hall Rumuokwuta; Mgbuakara Town Hall Rumuokwuta; Mgbuoba Town Hall Rumuokwuta; Future Life Montessori Sch, Nta Road (Nta Area Hall Mgbuogba); Oha Ada Street, Mgbuoba; Adaolu; Rumuola; Town Hall, Rumuola I; Town Hall, Rumuola II; Oro-Ofu Rumuola; S. S. Olannada Rumuola; College Of Arts & Science, Rumuola; Ofumgbuike Hall I; Ofumgbuike Hall II; Ofumgbuike Hall III; Ofumgbuike Hall IV; Omaralu Street, Rumuadaolu; Army Child's School G. R. A. II
Obio/Akpor	Rukpoku	Elikpokwuodu Play Ground, Rukpokou; Elikpokwuodu Town Hall, Rukpokou; Rumuwopara Play Ground Rukpokou; Rumuapu Town Hall Rukpokou; Eledo Town Hall Rukpoku; Mgbuchi/Eledo Town Rukpoku; C. P. S School Building Rukpoku; Rumuesara Town Hall Eneka; State School Bullding Eneka; C. P. S I Bullding Eneka; Rumuowha Play Ground Eneka I; Rumuowha Play Ground Eneka II; G. S. S. School Bullding Eneka; C. P. S II/Rumuowegu School Bullding Eneka; Rumuochiolu Play Ground Eneka; Rumuolukwu Play Ground Eneka; Rumuogunoma Play Ground Eneka; Echenou Hall Eneka
Obio/Akpor	Choba	Okwuruozu Play Ground, Rumuosi I; Okwuruozu Play Ground, Rumuosi II; Rumumba Play Ground Rumuosi; Rumuechinyere Hall, Rumuosi I; Rumuechinyere Hall, Rumuosi II; Rumukigom Hall Rumuekini; Rumuokwuru Play Ground, Rumuekini; Rumuokwuru Play Ground Rumuekini; Rumuokwudo, Rumuekini I; Rumuokwudo, Rumuekini II; Rumuokwudo, Rumuekini III; C. S. S. School Bullding Rumukini; Rumuolu Town Hall Rumuekini; Rumuchakara Hall Choba I; Rumuchakara Hall Choba II; Owhipa Play Ground Choba I; Owhipa Play Ground Choba II; Ndudor Play Ground Choba I; Ndudor Play Ground Choba II; Rumuokocha Play Ground, Choba I; Rumuokocha Play Ground Choba II; U. P. E School Bullding Choba; Uniport Delta Park Choba; Uniport Abuja Park Choba; Rumudike Play Ground, Alakahia I; Rumudike Play Ground, Alakahia II; Rumuolugbo Hall Alakahia; Rumuobogwu Hall Alakahia I; Rumuobogwu Hall Alakahia II; Rumuodomaya Play Ground Alakahia; Rumuchukwu Town Hall, Rumualogu; Rumuedi Town Hall, Rumualogu; Rumulite Rumualogu
Obio/Akpor	Ozuoba/Ogbogoro	Rumukpalawuda Town Hall, Ogbogoro; Rumuedo Town Hall, Ogbogoro I; Rumuedo Town Hall, Ogbogoro II; Rumuadi Town Hall, Ogbogoro I; Rumuadi Town Hall, Ogbogoro II; Rumuwoke Play Ground Ogbogoro; Rumuenwenwo Town Hall Ogbogoro I; Rumuenwenwo Town Hall Ogbogoro II; Rumubisior Town Hall Ogbogoro; Anaka Bussop, Ogbogoro; Eleluozodo Town Hall, Ogbogoro; Egbulumgbaraja Town Hal, Ogbogoro; Anaka Oil Hall, Ogbogoro; Rumuowol Hall, Ogbogoro; A. G. S School Building Ozuoba I; A. G. S School Building Ozuoba II; Rumuokani Play Ground Ozuoba; Rumuchukwuannya Play Ground Ozuoba I; Rumuchukwuannya Play Ground Ozuoba II; Rumuogbo Play Ground Ozuoba I; Rumuogbo Play Ground Ozuoba II; Rumuorio Play Ground Ozuoba; Ozuoba/Ognogoroko Road, Ozuoba; Amadioha Play Ground, Ozuoba; Rumuluga Hall, Rumukwachi; Rumuiriolu Town Hall, Rumukwachi; Rumuari Play Ground Rumukwachi; Rumuokwakan Play Ground, Rumuokparali; Rumuadabo Town Hall, Rumukwachi; Rumuosisi Hall, Rumuokparali; Rumume Play Ground, Rumuokparali; Rumuyerenye Play Ground, Rumuokparali; Rumuomah Play Ground Rumuokparali
Obio/Akpor	Rumuolumeni	C. O. E, Rumuolumeni; Eagle Cement Rumuolumeni; Naval Base Rumuolumeni; Nkpor Town Hall Rumuolumeni I; Nkpor Town Hall Rumuolumeni II; Ngboriha Square Rumuolumeni; Minikpiti Hall Rumuolumeni; Azumini Rumuolumeni; Mgbuakara Rumuolumeni; Mgbuoshimini C. P. S. Rumuolumeni I; Mgbuoshimini C. P. S. Rumuolumeni II; Mgbuoshimini C. P. S. Rumuolumeni III; Echendu Hall, Rumuolumeni; Ngbuadaya, Rumuolumeni
Ogba/Egbema/Ndoni	Omoku Town I	Giakor Street, Omoku Umu-Oba; Obosi Play Ground Obosi I; Obosi Play Ground Obosi II; Play Ground, Umu-Ohali; Oburu Play Ground, Umu-Nga I; Oburu Play Ground, Umu-Nga II; 61 Akor Street Omoku, Umu-Oba; Chief Ohia's Comp. Umuekegbofa; Umuihi Village Omoku, Umu-Egbu; Chief Orike's Compound Umudarmata; Frontage Of Chif Osai's Compound; Origbo's Settlement, Umu-Ogolo; Chief E Okara's Comp. Umuegbulocha; Elder Sampson's Comp. Umu-Ajieta; Chief Ebenezer Egbirika
Ogba/Egbema/Ndoni	Omoku Town II	Play Ground Obakata; Chief Jackson Agbidibia, Udeede; No. 4 Umuodugu Lane, Umuodogu; Near Ezeali Obakata; Kalagreen Odiu Front, Umuede; Ukposi Lane Obarata, Umudinah; Abun Street; Obiohuru, Umu Aiabia; Umuedeh Open Space; Chief S. Ogbowu's Comp. Umuusoma; Uriem Square Obarata; Umu-Udinaa Settlement, Umudinawoko; Okie Settlement, Okerewoko; Umu-Ellah Settlement, Umu Imo; Umu-Ellah Omoku West, Umu Imo
Ogba/Egbema/Ndoni	Omuku Town (Obieti)	Ahia Orie Play Ground, Umuagburu; Ahia Orie Comp. Umu Uriem; Ihiukwu Play Ground, Ihiukwu I; Ihiukwu Play Ground, Ihiukwu II; Igbama Open Space; Oroko's Open Space Umuchi; Umu Ruka's Comp. Umuomuruka; Okoroma's Comp. Umu Akocha; Orie's Open Space Umu Soma; Okorie's Open Space, Umuezeni; Nkwekeowure Space; Nwaobakata Space, Umueze; Umu-Okara Open Space; St-Stephen's Primary School Umuiobeji; Adah's Open Space, Umu-Ekoji
Ogba/Egbema/Ndoni	Omoku Town IV (Usomini)	Play Ground Umuokirie; People's State School Umuoyasara; Benji's Open Space, Umuokopocha; Near Akugbo Comp. Umu-Ekeoh I; Near Akugbo Comp. Umu-Ekeoh II; Chief Gilbert Dibiafront, Omotobo; Opp. People's State School Umu Ikemta; Ohiali/Oba Road, Umu-Ohialaeke; Obohia Play Ground; Chiekere's Comp.; 7, Eleria Street, Open Space; Usomini Play Ground, Umueke; Iyasara Road Ground; 3, Agbiru Street, Open Space; Front Of F. C. E (Tech) Umuoreke
Ogba/Egbema/Ndoni	Obrikom	Town Hall Obor I; State School Hall Obrikom I; State School Hall Obie; State School Hall Obrikom II; State School Hall Obrikom III; Town Hall Egbolioro; Village Square Okpurukpauli; Obrikom Play Ground; Chief H. Akio's Front, Obrikom; Obiohuru Play Ground Obor II; Umu-Soma Quarter, Obrikom
Ogba/Egbema/Ndoni	Usomini South Kreigani	Town Hall Kreigani I; C. P. S. Kreigani II; Town Hall Kreigani III; Town Hall Iduobosuikwu I; School Comp. Iduobosuikwu II; Orukwor's Comp Iduobosuikwu III; Play Ground Iduosobile I; Play Ground Iduosobile II; Market Square Iduosobile III; Town Hall, Aligwu; Town Hall, Ohaliusomini; Village Square, Alinsokanu
Ogba/Egbema/Ndoni	Igburu	Play Ground Egbida; Town Hall Okansu; Town Hall Uju; C. P. S. Osiakpu; C. P. S. Eliete I; C. P. S. Eliete II; C. P. S. Ikiri; Town Hall Elehia; C. P. S Ohiaugu I; Old Upe Ama I; Old Upe Ama II; Town Hall Obigwe; Town Hall Ogbidi; State School Okpos I; State School Okpos II; C. P. S Eleta; C. P. S Ohiaugu II
Ogba/Egbema/Ndoni	Egi I	School Hall Obite I; Open Space Obite II; Anama Umuohau, Obite III; Town Hall Ogbogu I; School Hall Ogbogu II; Open Space Ogbogu III; Open Space Ogbogu IV; Town Hall Akabuka I; Court Hall, Akabuka II; Open Space Akabuka III; Open Space Akabuka IV; Nwigbu Obihuru Akabuka V; School Hall Ede I; Primary School Hall Ede II
Ogba/Egbema/Ndoni	Egi II	Primary School Hall Ohalu-Elu; Town Hall Obagi; Primary School Hall Obigbor; Town Hall, Obuburu I; Near Umuakpajamilu, Obuburu II; Near Ishikiohoko Family Obuburu III; Near Mabuwiigi Family Obuburu IV; School Hall Obagi; Primary School Hall, Obuburu V; Ibagwa Play Ground, Obuburu VI; Open Space Obuburu VII; Okoro Ahiakwo Comp, Obuburu VIII
Ogba/Egbema/Ndoni	Egi III (Erema)	Town Hall, Erema I; Primary School Hall Erema II; Primary School Hall Erema III; State School Hall Abururu; Play Ground Ikeja Square; Town Hall Umu-Akpa I; Town Hall Umu-Akpa II; Town Hallerema IV; Nwaogbo's Front Age, Umu-Awhueerema; Obudira Open Space, Obiedi Erewa; Obubachi Play Ground; Town Hall, Odiedi; Primary School Hall, Itu; Town Hall, Ibewa I; Town Hall, Ibewa II; Town Hall, Ibewa III; Town Hall, Ibewa IV
Ogba/Egbema/Ndoni	Egbema I	Beside Church, Ebocha I; Agid East Ebocha II; Village Square Obumzie; Primary School Mgbede I; Primary School Mgbede II; Community Square Mgbede III; Community Square Mgbede IV; C. P. S Ekpe-Mgbede I; C. P. S Ekpe-Mgbede II; Primary School Hall Okwuzi I; Community Square Okwuzi II; Community Square Okwuzi; Village Square Ugada; Community Square Mgbede V; Community Square Mgbede VI; Ishioru Community Square Mgbede VII; Eze-Ali's Comp. Front Mgbede VIII; Community Hall Okwuzi V
Ogba/Egbema/Ndoni	Egbema II	Community Girls' School Aggah I; Community Girls' School Aggah II; Aggah C. P. S Aggah III; C. G. S. S Aggah IV; C. P. S Aggah V; C. P. S Aggah VI; Community Square Ukpazizi I; Community Square Ukpazizi II; Community Square Ekpe-Aggah I; Community Square Ekpe-Aggah II; Primary School Hall Ekpe-Aggah III; Primary School Hall Ekpe-Aggah IV
Ogba/Egbema/Ndoni	Ndoni I	Ogbukwu Quarters, Ogbukwu I; Ogbukwu Quarters, Ogbukwu II; Village Square Inwagwe I; Village Square Inwagwe II; Primary School Hall Umuajie; Ogbukwu Quarters, Ogbukwu III; Primary School Hall, Umuajie II; Community Square Iyowele I; Community Square Iyowele II; Open Space Ugbebi I; Open Space Ugbebi II; Open Space Ugbebi III; Village Square Inagwe II; Open Space Onu Agba; Village Square Isala I; Village Square Isala II; Ogwezi Square; Awo -Achi
Ogba/Egbema/Ndoni	Ndoni II	Village Square Abadiuku; Village Square Onukwu I; Village Square Ase-Imonite I; Umu-Awor Quarters, Umuawor I; Umuoyema Qtrs, Umuoyema I; Umuo Yema Qtrs Umuoyema II; Umu-Okeya Qtrs, Umuokeya I; Umu-Okeya Qtrs, Umuokeya II; Umu-Oyema Qtrs, Umuoyema III; Village Square Obikwele I; Village Square Obikwele II; Village Square Obikwele III; Village Square Abadikwu II; Village Square Onukwu; Town Square, Ase /Monite II; Umu Awor Square; Umu-Oyema IV Qtrs; Umu-Okeya III Qtrs; Umu-Okeya IV Qtrs; Umu-Okeya V Qtrs; Umuokeya VI Qtrs; Village Square, Obikwele IV; Village Square, Obikwele V; Village Square, Obikwele VI; New Layout, Umuoyema VII; Village Square, Umuohodu; Village Square, Abadukwu I; Village Square, Abadukwu II
Ogba/Egbema/Ndoni	Ndoni III	Ime- Obodo I; Shell Camp Location Amizeze I; Village Square Ugbaja I; Village Square Ogbogene I; Village Square Utuechi I; Sch. Hall Agwe I; Sch. Hall Agwe II; Sch. Square Oyiosa I; Sch. Square Oyiosa II; Ime-Obodo II Qtrs.; Village Square Mission; Pri. Sch. Hall Isukwa; Shell Camp Location, Annieze II; Village Square Ogogene II; Village Square Odugili; Village Square Obiofu; Pri. Sch. Hall Ufu; Obiofu Open Space, Agwe III; Open Space, Utuochi II; Play Ground, Utuochi III
Ogba/Egbema/Ndoni	Omoku Town V	Front Of Palace, Umu Eze Ogba I; Palace Location Road, Eze Oguba II; Eze Ogba Play Ground, Eze Ogba III; Eze Ogba Play Ground, Eze Ogba IV; Ahia Orie Square, Umu-Orodu I; Ahia Orie Square, Umu-Orodu II; Chief Ugorji's Comp., Umu-Egburu; Ellah's Comp., Umu-Enyike I; Ellah's Comp., Umu-Enyike II; Onwularu's Open Place, Umu Okoya; Osi Comp. / Ihiukwu St., Umu-Agbida I; Osi Comp. / Ihiukwu St., Umu-Agbida II; Ezekiel Uboh's Comp., Umu-Obakiri; Lawyer's Open Space, Nnemini; Court Hall, Umu-Imegi; Ahia Orie Square
Ogba/Egbema/Ndoni	Egi IV	Pri. Sch. Hall, Obukegi I; Pri. Sch. Hall, Obukegi II; Pri. Sch. Hall, Obukegi III; Town Hall, Obiyebe; Town Hall, Egita; Pri. Sch. Hall, Akabta I; Pri. Sch. Hall, Akabta II; Near Post Office, Akabita II; Pri. Sch. Hall; Pri. Sch. Hall, Obiozumini I; Pri. Sch. Hall, Obiozumini II; Pri. Sch. Hall, Obiozumini III
Ogu/Bolo	Ogu I	Compound Hall Kune; Open Space Kune I; Open Space Kune II; Open Space Toritor; Open Space Opugor I; Open Space Opugor II; Open Space Opugor III; Compound Hall, Agbara I; Open Space Agbara II; Open Space Perebo
Ogu/Bolo	Ogu II	Compound Hall, Gio I; Open Space Gio II; Open Space Gio III; Open Space Gio IV; Open Space Gio V; Open Space Abaji I; Sand Field Area, Abaji II; Open Space Abaji III; Open Space Kurukuru I; Compound Square, Kurukuru II; Open Space Kurukuru III
Ogu/Bolo	Ogu III	Open Space, Loko I; Old Market Square, Loko II; Old Market Square, Loko III; Open Space, Opudere; School Compound, Chuku-Amaa I; Town Square, Chuku-Amaa II; Comp. Square, Chuku-Wari I; Nengibo Play Ground, Chuku- Wari II; Comp. Hall, Chiri I; Open Space Chiri II; Comp. Play Ground Alli
Ogu/Bolo	Ogu IV	Open Space Inuma I; Open Space Inuma II; Open Space Niemieboka; Open Space Ofiamani; Open Space Kalaowi I; Open Space Kalaowi II; Open Space Abeji I; Open Space Abeji II; Open Space Opumbere; Open Space Opu-Ofiamani; Open Space Ngbeka
Ogu/Bolo	Ogu V	Comp. Hall, Furubowarifama I; Open Space, Furubowarifama II; Open Space Iruenabere; Open Space Egbelekpki I; Court Hall, Egbelekpki II; Open Space, Iruene; Open Space, Abamyeduko; School Hall, Tenda-Ama I; St. Martins Sch. I, Tenda-Ama II; St. Martins Sch. I, Tenda-Ama III; G. S. S Ogu, Tenda-Ama IV; G. S. S Ogu, Tenda-Ama V
Ogu/Bolo	Ogu VI	School Hall, Ikpo -Ama I; Village Square, Opu Ama; Open Space, Orabere-Kiri; Play Ground, Tombikuku / Ibiebee; State Sch. Owuogono I; Open Space, Gream-Ama; Open Space Ibiorukakiri; Village Square, Miniapukiri; Open Space, Owuogono; Open Space Ikpo-Ama
Ogu/Bolo	Bolo I	Open Space, Gbacha I; Open Space, Gbacha II; Open Space Omukoso I; Open Space Omukoso II; Open Space Jama Ogere; Open Space Temekungo; Open Space Arungo; Compound Hall Oruweri; Compound Hall Alagha II; Open Space Kele; Open Space Oriogba; Open Space Ogbolodo; Open Space Iwo/Ipoli
Ogu/Bolo	Bolo II	Open Space, Oruma; Open Space, Ofiamina; Open Space, Alagba; Open Space, Abenge; Play Ground Opueje; Open Space Otobo; Open Space Ayomadiri; Open Space Iganibo; Open Space Opukuno-Chuku; Open Space Anne; Open Space Oforiboka/Amany; Open Space Amakiri/Adama; Open Space Court Hall/Odiagbaenbia
Ogu/Bolo	Bolo III	Open Space, Asemina Ngolaka I; Open Space, Asemina Ngolaka II; Allison Hall, Beribima-Kiri I; Allison Hall, Dagogo-Kiri II; Allison Hall, Imgbuluma-Kiri; Allison Hall, Imgbuluma-Wokiri I; Negisa Ground, Iwokiri II; Family Hall
Ogu/Bolo	Bolo IV	Open Space, Okolonibo; Open Space, Ilabia/Iwo Polo II; School Hall, Mission / Sch. Qtrs; Open Space, Koko I; Open Space Oru Wari II / Power House; Coleson Open Space, No Nju -Ama II; Coleson Open Space, New Layout; Coleson Open Space, Sika; Coleson Open Space, Koko II; Iwo - Polo II
Ogu/Bolo	Ele	Open Space, Perefi; Open Space, Imbu; Village Square, Ibiorika; Open Space, Worika; Open Space, Apina Oruchin; Open Space, Aberetonduko; Open Space, Nyigisika
Okrika	Okrika I	George Compound, Abeme Biri; Egweme Biri; Tomo Biri; Ogan Compound; Bileme Biri; Fiamasi Sokobe; Ibulubo Compound; Obianimie's Compound; Down Wakama Area; Oru Pabo; Opula Compound, Ala
Okrika	Okrika II	Anyungu Biri I; Anyungu Biri II; Anyungu Biri III; Anyungu Biri/Igbanibo/Ofokome; Odum Dikibo; Opungiriko / Adedeme; Awolome Biri (Kalawa); Awolome Biri Ele; Edereme Biri; Bulome Biri; Abaji - Oruedo; Jack - Bara Compound; Kiriyo / Ikpuku; Alatoru / Nyengierefaka; Dagogo / Okani / Iyalla; Anyungu Biri; Adedeme Biri
Okrika	Okrika III	Aberepikima, Koroniogono; Alhaji Iyagba Compound, Aseminaso; Gladstone Compound, Kalio; Oba Polo Square; Adetumaro Square; Evelun Orupabo Compound; Harold Oba Compound, Ala Bumo; Mathew's Orupabo's Compound; Olokori Compound Down, Aggo; Opudabaya Down, Dala Compound; Paul Datorudiki Compound
Okrika	Okrika IV	33 Atc Road, Daka; 24 Tank Road; 27 Opukpe, Fiberesima I; 12 Union Street, Gream Polo; Opukpe Fiberesima II; 1 Owoi House, Igia; 32 Union House Gream Polo, Odogorobe; Atc Sand Field, Irisoni Nawari Comp.; Atc Sand Field, Okpaku; Ele Lane; Atc Sand Field, Dasimeokuma; 32 Union House Gream Polo, Odogorobie
Okrika	Okrika V	Ibuluya State School; Dikibo Square; Okari Ama; Daka Ama; Ekerekana; Okochiri; Igbiri Ama; Abam; Omonubie; Aborodindemie; Pipe Line; State Sch. Orubie; State Sch. Ibuluya II
Okrika	Okrika VI	Pelebo Isaka I Land; Alabo Compound, Pelebo; Anji Comp. Isiaka I Land; Okomanga Fishing Port; Oyo House Of Assembly; Ogoh Comp. Isiaka I Land; Ogoh Iji. Isiaka I Land; Iwokiri/Ekpekiri Port; Kwani Square Ogbogbo; Omu Comp. Ogbogbo; Oruamabo Comp, Ogbogbo; Amadibo Comp.; Dawse Island I; Dawse Island II; Boloba I; Boloba II; Ikpukwubie I; Ikpukwubie II; Opuada Kiri; Ogbogbo Kiri; Chokorocho; Kala Kiri; Opu Arugbana; Ojomakiri; Biriaye Kiri; Osokolo's Compound; Pelebo Isaka Island
Okrika	Okrika VII	Bome/Opumbu-Ibaka; Opusoko Ibaka; Opukpaki Comp. Ibaka; Borungolaka Comp. Ibara; Kalam Comp. Ibaka; Market Square Ibaka; Bome/Opukpaku Cpl Ibaka; Bome Edwin Chuku-Ama; Tubomieye Kiri; Karama-Kiri; Sunday Palmer Kiri; Adokiate Kiri; Okiri's Compound
Okrika	Ogan	Ogan, Abesa/John; Ogan, Amos/Edward I; Ogan, Amos/Edward II; George, Amagiaka/Jackson; George, Enyinna/Joseph I; George, Enyinna/Joseph II; George Ama 1; George Ama 11; Ezinnayi Polo; Apia Polo; Fred Polo; Ogan Ama, Tamuno/Bomaseidima
Okrika	Kalio	Ndubuisi Compound, Ndubuisi Ama I; Ndubuisi Compound, Ndubuisi Ama II; Ndubuisi Compound, Ndubuisi Ama III; Aton Ama; Ezinwayi Compound; Omoni/Fineman Compound; Oba Ama; Mbaka/Obufe Compound; Amoni Ojimba Compound; Abam-Ama; Bipialaka Compound; Ibiapu Backshaw Compound; Abibo Ama; Kalio Compound Town Hall; Pribowapu/Obudibo/Abbey Compound
Okrika	Ogoloma I	Okolobo Layout; Koroni Layout; Chukuni Square; Koko Layout; Kalanga Square; Ikenata Square
Okrika	Ogoloma II	Ibanime Square; Egeme Square; Ayeme Square; Owu Square; Oguleme Square
Okrika	Ogoloma III	Koko Square; Okumgba Square; Akulama Yard, Sara; School Yard, Sara; Akainkoroma; Kalakama; Sara II Square
Omuma	Eberi-Dikeomuuo Community	Umuebie Umunwo Gba Town Hall Umuebie; Town Hall, Umuebie I; Town Hall, Umuebie II; Umuokpota I Town Hall; Umuokpota II Town Hall; Umuakalika I Town Hall; Umuakalika II Town Hall; Umunyie I Community Hall; Umunyie II Town Hall; Umuebie III Town Hall; Umuebie IV Town Hall
Omuma	Ariraniiri/Owu-Ahia Community	Umuobasi Town Hall, Umuamadi I; Umuobasi Town Hall, Umuamadi II; Umuobasi Town Hall, Umuecheji I; Umuobasi Town Hall, Umuecheji II; State School Umudu, Umuokorougo-Adiele I; State School Umudu, Umuokorougo-Adiele II; Umuaguozia Community Centre, Umunaogukoji; Umuaguozia Community Centre, Otuebe/Chukwu; Umuelechi I Community Hall; Umuagu Village Square; Community Hall, Umuokpurukpu; Town Hall, Umuelechi II; Owahia Square, Umuokpurukpu Onumiri; Village Centre, Umuokpurukpu
Omuma	Obiohia Community	Umuakpili Village Hall, Umuofor; Umuakpili Village Hall, Umunwere; Umuakpili Village Hall, Umuakpili; Umulo I Village Hall I; Umulo I Village Hall II; Umuokoro Village Centre; State School Umualuo I/Obiohia; Umualuo II Town Hall; Okpulor I Village Square I; Okpulor I Village Square II; Village Centre Umuazuonwu I; Village Centre Umuazuonwu II; Town Hall, Umunwaforshi; Umunachi Town Hall, Umuokporo; State School Umuadi/Umuagwu; Umuagwu Village Centre I; Umuagwu Village Centre II; Umunwaogo Compound Square, Umulor III; Umunwaogo Compound Square, Umulor IV; Town Hall, Umuagwu-Okpulor II
Omuma	Ohimogho Community	Umueke I Village Hall; Umueke II Village Square; Umuokewo I Community Hall; Umuokewo II Community Hall; Umuokewo Etiti Village Centre; State School Ohim/Oyoro, Umugwu I; Umugwu II Community Hall; Umua Kpili I Community Square; Umuobuo I Town Hall; Umuobuo II Town Hall; Town Hall, Oluo-Okemanu; Village Square, Umuobuo III; Town Hall, Umuakpili II
Omuma	Oyoro	State School Amaji, Umunwajie; Amaji Town Hall, Umuokoro Afor; Amaji Town Hall, Umuajunwa; Umuohie Village Hall; State School Umuoko I; Imeazulor Village Centre, Umuoko II; Umuonyia I Village Hall; Umuonyia II Village Hall; State School Ohim/Oyoro; State School Ohim/Oyoro Umuoyoro Centre; Umuobasi-Ukwu Town Hall
Omuma	Ofeh Community	State School Umuakirikpo, Umuogwogwo; Umuakirikpo Community Hall Umunle; Umuakirikpo I Community Hall; Umunwacha I Village Hall; Umunwacha II Village Centre; Umuoshi Village Centre; Umuoshi Village Umuimo; State School Umuoshi, Umuechere I; State School Umuoshi, Umuechere II; Umunwaka I Village Square; Umunwaka II Town Hall; Umunwaka III Town Hall; State School Hall, Umuakirikpo II; Town Hall, Umuezenwa
Omuma	Umuogba I Community	State School I Umuoyere III; Umuoyere I Hall; Umuoyere II Town Hall; Umuoyere III Town Hall; Umunju I Town Hall; Umueche Hall, Umunju I; Umunju III Village Square; Umudike I Town Hall; C. S. S Umuogba, Umudike II; Umudike III Town Hall; Umumbra Town Hall; Umumbra Town Hall Umuola; Town Hall Umuomesi; Town Hall Umumbra
Omuma	Umuogba II Community	Umuodiri I Town Hall; Umuodiri II Town Hall; Umuroke I Community Hall; Umuroke Community Hall; Umuekegbulu I Town Hall; Umuekegbulu II Town Hall; State School Umuogba, Umueze I; State School Umuogba, Umueze II; Umusu Community Hall; Umuocham Community Hall
Omuma	Obibi/Ajuloke Community	State School, Umuokwa; Umuokwa Town Hall I; Umuokwa Town Hall II; State School Umuofeke; Umuoffke Town Hall; Umuabali Town Hall; Council Hall, Umugwu; Umudu Village Square; Umuwa I Town Hall; Umuwa II Town Hall
Omuma	Umuajuloke Community	Umuerim I Town Hall; Umuerim II Town Hall; Umuerim III Town Hall; Umuolilo I Community Hall; Umuolilo II Community Hall; State School Egbelu I; State School Egbelu II; Umuakali I Community Hall; Umuakali II Community Hall; Umudike II Community Hall; Egbeli Community Town Hall, Umudike; Egbelu III Community Town Hall; Umuerim IV Town Hall
Opobo/Nekoro	Kalaibiama I	Main Gate Community Hall, Kalaisiama; Comp Square Open Space Kalaisiama Minimah; Comp Square Open Space Kalaisiama Oblulu Minimah; Comp Square Open Space Kalaisiama Adibie Minimah; Comp. Square Kalaibiama Iloma; Primary School Kalaibiama, Jack Tolofari; Village Square Open Space, Kalaisiama Aladma Leggjack; Comp. Square Open Space, Doctor Dappa; Comp. Square Open Space, Ocoma; Comp. Square Kalaibiama Diri I; Comp. Square Kalaibiama Diri II; Comp. Square Kalaibiama Brown Agent; Comp. Square Kalaibiama Okpukpo; Comp. Square Kalaibiama Ikpodiri; Primary School Kalaibiama School Avenue
Opobo/Nekoro	Kalaibiama II	Main Gate Stewart Comp. Hall; Village Square, Iwoma Atoki; Maingate Community Building, Wogudappa; Comp. Square Open Space, Dickjohn; Village Square Open Space, Ayamunimah; Primary School Hall, Ekeregborokiri; Comp. Square Open Space, John Africa; Main Gate Community Hall, Main Toby; Town Square Eppelema, Opusunju; Comp. Square Eppelema, Opusunju; Comp. Square Open Space, Adatom People; Comp. Square Open Space, John Africa; Main Gate Community Hall, Kalaibiama; Comp. Square, Open Space Eppelema Tilibo
Opobo/Nekoro	Diepiri	Main Gate Community Hall, Town; Comp. Square Open Space, Atari; Main Gate Comp. Building, Daminabo; Main Gate Open Space, Okoronkwo; Main Gate Community Hall, Peter Side; Comp. Square Open Space, Shoo Peter Side; Main Gate Waribo Open Space, Uranta; Main Gate Community Building, Ubani; Comp. Square Open Space, Ozuochie; Comp. Square Open Space, Mainogolo; Comp. Square Open Space, Damunabo; Comp. Square, Open Space, Doo Peter Side; Main Gate Open Space, Opobo Town Egbelu; Main Gate Open Space, Atobera; Main Gate Community Hall, Joseph Ogolo; Main Gate Community Hall, Juruma Iroaya
Opobo/Nekoro	Ukonu	Comp. Square Open Space, Opobo Town; Community Hall Open Space Cookey Gam; Community Square Open Space, Apiafi; Main Gate Community Hall, Waribo Cookey; Comp. Square Open Space, Wariso; Comp. Square Open Space, Bellgam; Comp. Square Open Space, Piri/Diogu; Commp. Square Open Space, George Cookey I; Comp. Square Open Space, George Cookey II; Comp. Square Open Space, George Pepple; Main Gate Community Hall, John Cookey
Opobo/Nekoro	Dappaye Ama-Kiri I	Comp. Square Open Space, Israel Black; Comp. Square Open Space, Fibiri; Comp. Square Open Space, Manilla; Main Gate Community Building, Fubara Ogolo; Comp. Square Open Space Jungo Manilla; Main Gate Open Space Hall, Gogo Fubara; Main Gate Open Space Hall, Black Fubara I; Comp. Square Open Space, Black Fubara II; Main Gate Open Space Hall, Fubara Fibiri; Class Room School Building, Jekituala; Comp. Square Open Space, Ogolo Fubara; Comp. Square Open Space, Minini Eppelle
Opobo/Nekoro	Dappaye Ama-Kiri II	Main Gate Community Hall, Cookey Brown; Comp. Hall Open Space, Sameppele; Comp. Square Open Space, Kalamuso; Main Gate Community Building, Ogbonna; Main Gate Community Hall, Jacob John Brown; Comp. Square Open Space, Charles Eppelle I; Comp. Square Open Space, Charles Eppelle II; Main Gate Community Building Finebone; Comp. Square Open Space, John Tom Brown; Main Gate Community Building, Nengia; Comp. Square Open Space, Yellow Brown; Comp. Square Open Space, Miinrine Eppelle; Comp. Square Open Space, Oko Eppelle; Comp. Square Open Space, Peter Cookeye; Comp. Square Open Space, Tom Brown; Main Gate Comp. Hall, Bupo
Opobo/Nekoro	Jaja	Main Gate, Jim Jaja Community Building; Primary School Hall Pembe; Palace Gate Community Building, Opuwari; Main Gate Community Building, Jaja; Comp. Square Open Space, Ozu-Jaja; Main Gate Bruce Jaja; Main Gate Comp. Building, Mac Pepple; Main Gate Comp. Building, Wariku; Comp. Square Open Space, Thomas Jaja; Comp. Square Open Space, Ajiere Jaja; Main Gate Comp. Building, Aaron Jaja; Main Gate Community Building, Sunday Jaja; Comp. Square Open Space, Omubo Pepple; Main Gate Open Space, Kampa; Comp. Square Open Space, Saturday Jaja; Main Gate Open Space, Anne Pepple; Comp. Square Open Space Oko-Jaja; Comp. Square Open Space Accra/Yellow; Main Gate Cyprian Jaja; Main Gate Open Space, Oko Jaja; Comp. Square Open Space, Agewt Jaja I; Comp. Square Open Space, Agewt Jaja II; Comp. Square Open Space, Chief Accra Pepple; Comp. Square Open Space, Tom Jaja; Comp. Square Open Space, Adaijeh Jaja
Opobo/Nekoro	Queens Town Kalama	Village Square Open Space, Kalasunju; Village Square Open Space, Abasibie I; Comp. Square Open Space, Captain Uranta; Comp. Square Open Space, Obomanu I; Village Square Open Space, Ikiriko; Comp. Square Open Space, Emeruwa; Class Room Primary School Abasibie II; Market Square Open Space, Down Bello; Main Gate Community Hall, Captain Uranta II; Main Gate Community Hall, Captain Uranta III; Main Gate Community Hall, Obomanu II; Main Gate Community Hall, Obomanu III
Opobo/Nekoro	Nkoro I	Chief Council Amayanabo's Palace; Primary School I Class Room, Amabara; Comp. Square Open Space, Kobiri/Ngere/Omuso/Ole; Chief's Palace Open Space, Offruma; Primary School Hall, Oroni; Village Square, Ayama
Opobo/Nekoro	Nkoro II	Comp. Square Open Space Nkoro/Ataemie; Maket Square, Daba/Dom/Okansi/Tamuno; C. P. S. Primary School Olom Nkoro; Village Square Open Space Sukuama; Village Square Portalai Open Space; Comp. Square Iwoama Open Space; C. P. S. Iwoama School Hall, Ese; St. Michael Church Hall, Ogoama
Opobo/Nekoro	Nkoro III	Primary School Afakani, Nkoro; Comp. Square Open Space, Bara; Comp. Square Open Space Ottoni; Ottoni Bara Square Open Space; Village Square Open Space, Ayaama II; C. H. S. Nkoro Building, Ikwaro/Jobama/Nkpete/Nkoro
Oyigbo	Okoloma	School Hall C. P. S. Okoloma; School Hall Foundation College; Open Space, Dike's Compound; Village Square, Ayama; Open Space, Mark's Comp. Ayama; Market Square, Obunku
Oyigbo	Obeakpu	School Hall, C. P. S. Obeakpu; Open Space, Plantaion; Open Space, Mgbala Ikoro; Open Space, Shell Junction; Open Space, Fillng Station; Open Space, Vin Square; Open Space, Imo Street; Open Space, Abam Street; School Hall, State School Umuosi; Umudike Square; Umubele Open Space; Mgboji Court Hall; Mgboji Market Square; G. C. D. C Umuosi Hall; Town Hall Obeakpu
Oyigbo	Egburu	Egburu Square; Market Square; Ngwuro Square; Umuokere Open Space; Nworgu's Comp. Open Square; Nwagbara's Comp. Open Square; Ohandu Open Square; Okereukwu's Ext Open Square; Okija Comp. Open Square; Umugbali Open Square; Afam Ukwu Village Open Square; Afam Nta Town Square; C. P. S. Afam Ukwu School Hall; Okere's Comp. Afam Nta; Afam Ukwu Town Hall
Oyigbo	Umuagbai	C. P. S. School, Akawor; Open Space Ekeugbo; Open Space Onwanne Square; Open Space Akawor /Uhuobu; Agbomini Hall; Uhuobu Hall Abam; Okere Town Hall; Akawor Hall; Open Space Weaving Centre; Open Space Ekerenta; Open Space Maternity; G. S. S Umuagba Gate; Akawor Open Space; College Road Open Space; Stream Road Open Space; Town Hall Umuagbai
Oyigbo	Azuogu	Mgbu Market Square; C. P. S. Azuogu Hall; C. P. S Okpontu Hall; C. P. S Marihu Hall; Mgbu Town Hall
Oyigbo	Oyigbo West	Primary School Hall Oyigbo West; Open Space Timber Market; Open Space Mbano Camp; Open Space Express Junction; Open Space Location Area; Akparata Maket Square; Open Space, Police Qtrs.; Oyigbo West; Uka/Zion Hall, Abuja Residents
Oyigbo	Oyigbo Central	Governor's Office I; Governor's Office II; Town School Hall; Cp. S. Oyigbo; Motor Park I Open Office; Motor Park II Open Office; Market Master I Hall; Market Master II Hall; Central School I Hall; Central School II Hall; Oyibo Market Open Space; Nwafor Junction Open Space; Mayor's Comp Open Space; Down Bello Open Space; Nwogu's Comp Open Space I; Nwogu's Comp Open Space II; Charles Ibe Area Open Space; Palace Road Area, Open Space
Oyigbo	Komkom	Town Hall Umusoya; Open Space Ukpabi; Open Space Umusoya Junction; Ohafia Square; Market Square; S. S. I Kom Kom Hall; Village Square; Ideator Royal Close Open Space; Umuwarie Open Space
Port Harcourt	Oromineke/Ezimgbu	Chinwenyi Hall, Port Hacourt I; Chinwenyi Hall, Port Hacourt II; Chinwenyi Hall, Port Hacourt III; State School Oromenike I; State School Oromenike II; State School Oromenike III; State School Oromenike IV; Obiri Ikwunga I; Obiri Ikwunga II; Obiri Ikwunga III; Wobia Gate I; Wobia Gate II; Wobia Gate III; Ezimgbu (Chinda Hall) I; Ezimgbu (Chinda Hall) II; Ezimgbu Hall Space I; Ezimgbu Hall Space II; Ezimgbu Ajikeru; Ezimgbu Ruhu-Eli Open Space; Ezimgbu Rewha Hall; Ezimgbu Ogunka Open Space I; Ezimgbu Chiike Hall; Ezimgbu Tombia Street, G. R. A
Port Harcourt	Orogbum	Chinwenyi Hall, Port Hacourt I; Chinwenyi Hall, Port Hacourt II; Chinwenyi Hall, Port Hacourt III; State School Oromenike I; State School Oromenike II; State School Oromenike III; State School Oromenike IV; Obiri Ikwunga I; Obiri Ikwunga II; Obiri Ikwunga III; Wobia Gate I; Wobia Gate II; Wobia Gate III; Ezimgbu (Chinda Hall) I; Ezimgbu (Chinda Hall) II; Ezimgbu Hall Space I; Ezimgbu Hall Space II; Ezimgbu Ajikeru; Ezimgbu Ruhu-Eli Open Space; Ezimgbu Rewha Hall; Ezimgbu Ogunka Open Space I; Ezimgbu Chiike Hall; Ezimgbu Tombia Street, G. R. A
Port Harcourt	Oroabali	Ogbunabili Hall I; Ogbunabili Hall II; Ogbunabili Hall III; Ogbunabili Hall IV; Atako Hall I; Atako Hall II; Atako Hall III; Atako Hall IV; Atako Hall V; Chinwo Hall I (Obiri Amadi I); Chinwo Hall II (Obiri Amadi II); Chinwo Hall III (Obiri Amadi III); Chinwo Hall IV (Obiri Worgu I); Chinwo Hall V (Obiri Worgu II); Chinwo Hall VI (Obiri Nyeche I); Chinwo Hall VII (Obiri Nyeche II); Chio Kwa Hall I; Ogbum Nuabali Hall (Chiokwa Hall II); Chio Kwa Hall III; Chio Kwa Hall IV; Chio Kwa Hall V; Chio Kwa Hall VI; Chio Kwa Hall VII; Ogbum Nuabali Hall (Chiokwa Hall VIII); Amadi Flat Police Post I; Amadi Flat Police Post II; Amadi Flat Police Post III; Amadi Flat Police Post IV; Amadi Flat Police Post V; Amadi Flat Police Post VI; Amadi Flat Police Post VII; Orianwo Hall; Obiri Nyeche III
Port Harcourt	Ogbunabali	P. H Primary School I; P. H Primary School II; P. H Primary School III; P. H Primary School IV; Pabod Primary School I; Pabod Primary School II; Pabod Primary School III; Pabod Primary School IV; Pabod Primary School V; Pabod Primary School VI; Holy Rosary Secondary School I; Holy Rosary Secondary School II; Holy Rosary Secondary School III; Holy Rosary Secondary School IV; Holy Rosary Secondary School V; Holy Rosary Secondary School VI; Holy Rosary Secondary School VII; U. P. E Sangana I; U. P. E Sangana II; U. P. E Sangana III; U. P. E Sangana IV; U. P. E Sangana V; U. P. E Sangana VI; U. P. E Sangana VII; U. P. E Sangana VIII; U. P. E Sangana IX; U. P. E Sangana X; U. P. E Sangana XI; U. P. E. Sangana XII; U. P. E. Sangana XIII; U. P. E Orogbum School I; U. P. E Orogbum School II; U. P. E Orogbum School III; U. P. E Orogbum School IV; U. P. E Orogbum School V; U. P. E Orogbum School VI; U. P. E. Orogbum School VII
Port Harcourt	Port Harcourt Township	St. Mary's Primary School I; St. Mary's Primary School II; St. Mary's Primary School III; St. Mary's Primary School IV; St. Mary's Primary School V; St. Mary's Primary School VI; St. Mary's Primary School VII; St. Mary's Primary School VIII; Sea Shell Primary School I; Sea Shell Primary School II; Sea Shell Primary School III; Benard Carr Primary School I; Benard Carr Primary School II; Benard Carr Primary School III; Benard Carr Primary School IV; Benard Carr Primary School V; Benard Carr Primary School VI; Benard Carr Primary School VII; Stella Marris College I; Stella Marris College II; Stella Marris College III; Stella Marris College IV; Stella Marris College V; Stella Marris College VI; State School Bundu I; State School Bundu II; State School Bundu III; State School Bundu IV; State School Bundu V; 2, Field Road I; 2, Field Road II; Bende Street Basketball Pitch; St. Cyprian's School Hospital Road I; St. Cyprian's School Hospital Road II; St. Cyprian's School Hospital Road III; St. Cyprian's School Hospital Road IV; St. Cyprian's School Hospital Road V; Open Space Along Creek Road; Nembe Water Front I; Nembe Water Front II; N. U. J Moscow Road I; N. U. J Moscow Road II; N. U. J Moscow Road III; N. U. J Moscow Road IV; N. U. J Moscow Road V; C. P. S. Port- Harcourt I; C. P. S. Port- Harcourt II; C. P. S. Port- Harcourt III; C. P. S. Port- Harcourt IV; C. P. S. Port- Harcourt V; C. P. S. Port- Harcourt VI; C. P. S. Port Harcourt VII; C. P. S. Port Harcourt VIII; C. P. S. Port Harcourt IX; G. G. S. S Harour Road I; G. G. S. S Harour Road II; G. G. S. S Harour Road III; G. G. S. S Harour Road IV; G. G. S. S Harour Road V; G. G. S. S Harour Road VI; Npa Dockyard Gate; Police Quarters Creek Road; Opposite Adok's Filling Station
Port Harcourt	Port Harcourt Township VI	St. Jude's Primary School I; St. Jude's Primary School II; Near Former Pan Bank I; Near Former Pan Bank II; Near Former Pan Bank III; 6, Filed (Bende Street) I; 6, Filed (Bende Street) II; 6, Filed (Bende Street) III; 6, Filed (Bende Street) IV; 6, Filed (Bende Street) V; Field [Bende Street]VI; Cultural Centre I; Cultural Centre II; Cultural Centre III; Cultural Centre IV; St. Peter's Primary School, Opp. C. S. S. Bookshop I; St. Peter's Primary School, Opp. C. S. S. Bookshop II; Water Glass Boat Yard I; Water Glass Boat Yard II; Marine Base I; Marine Base II; Marine Base III; U. N. A Primary School; Aggrey Road (After Banham) I; Aggrey Road (After Banham) II; Aggrey Road (After Banham) III; Barham Prima School I; Barham Primary School I; Barham Primary School II; Barham Primary School III; Hadicap Centre, Along Creelroad I; Hadicap Centre, Along Creelroad II; Hadicap Centre, Along Creel Road III; Hadicap Centre, Along Creel Road IV; Hadicap Centre, Along Creel Road V; Hadicap Centre, Along Creel Road VI; Hadicap Centre, Along Creel Road III; Hadicap Centre, Along Creel Road IV; Hadicap Centre, Along Creel Road V; Hadicap Centre, Along Creel Road VI; Township School, Moscow Road I; Township School, Moscow Road II; Township School, Moscow Road III
Port Harcourt	Port Harcourt VII	Govt. Comp. Secondary School Borokiri I; Govt. Comp. Secondary School Borokiri II; Govt. Comp. Secondary School Borokiri III; Govt. Comp. Secondary School Borokiri IV; Govt Secondary School Borokiri V; Govt. Secondary School Borokiri VI; Govt. Secondary School Borokiri VII; Govt. Secondary School Borokiri VIII; Govt. Secondary School Borokiri IX; Govt. Secondary School Borokiri X; Govt. Secondary School Borokiri XI; Govt. Secondary School Borokiri XII; Govt. Secondary School Borokiri XIII; Govt. Secondary School Borokiri XIV; Enitona High School Borokiri I; Bokokiri School I; Bokokiri School II; Bokokiri School III; Bokokiri School IV; Bokokiri School V; Upe Model Primary School Borokiri I; Upe Model Primary School Borokiri II; Upe Model Primary School Borokiri III; Upe Model Primary School Borokiri IV; Upe Model Primary School Borokiri V; Upe Model Primary School Borokiri VI; Upe Model Primary School Borokiri VII; Upe Model Primary School Borokiri VIII; Baptist High School I; Baptist High School II; Baptist High School III; Baptist High School IV; Baptist High School V; Baptist High School VI; Baptist High School VII; Baptist High School VIII; Baptis High School IX; Baptis High School X; St. John Primary School I; St. John Primary School II; St. John Primary School III; St. John Primary School IV; St. John Primary School V; St. John Primary School VI; St. John Primary School VII; St. John Primary School VIII; Ibadan Street Primary School I; Ibadan Street Primary School II; Ibadan Street Primary School III; Ibadan Street Primary School IV; Ibadan Street Primary School V; Ibadan Street Primary School VI; Ibadan Street Primary School VII; Ibadan Street Primary School VIII; Ibadan Street Primary School IX; Ibadan Street Primary School X
Port Harcourt	Ochiri/Rumukalagbor	St. John's College I; St. John's College II; St. John's College III; Ochiri Hall Open Space I; Ochiri Hall Open Space II; Ochiri Hall Open Space III; Ochiri Hall Open Space IV; Ochiri Hall Open Space V; Rebisi Hall Open Space I; Rebisi Hall Open Space II; Rebisi Hall Open Space III; Amadi Kalagbor Hall; Chuku-Olunda Hall; Enyo Hall
Port Harcourt	Oroworukwo	Ogbonda Mati Hall I; Ogbonda Mati Hall II; Ogbonda Mati Hall III; Ogbonda Mati Hall IV; Oroworukwo Town Hall Space I; Oroworukwo Town Hall Space II; Oroworukwo Town Hall Space III; Oroworukwo Town Hall Space IV; Oroworukwo Town Hall Space V; St. Paul's School I; St. Paul's School II; St. Paul's School III; Ichenwo Hall I; Ichenwo Hall II; Ogbu Hall; Ogoloma Hall; Owiriwa Hall
Port Harcourt	Nkpolu Oroworukwo	State School Rebisi Amaikibo Road I; State School Rebisi Amaikibo Road II; State School Rebisi Amaikibo Road III; State School Rebisi Amaikibo Road IV; State School Rebisi Amaikibo Road V; State School Rebisi Amaikibo Road VI; State School Rebisi Amaikibo Road VII; Obiri Wokora; Obiri Elechi I; Obiri Elechi II; Obiri Elechi III; St. Thomas School I; St. Thomas School II; St. Thomas School III; St. Thomas School VI; St. Thomas School; Okoku Hall I; Okoku Hall II; Enwume Avenue I; Enwume Avenue II; Mlle 3 Market I; Mlle 3 Market II; Obiri Okah Open Space I; Obiri Okah Open Space II; Obiri Wokom (Open Space) I; Obiri Wokom (Open Space) II; Town Hall Space (Nkpolu O Ruworuko) I; Town Hall Space (Nkpolu O Ruworuko) II; Town Hall Space (Nkpolu O Ruworuko) III; Town Hall Space (Nkpolu O Ruworuko) VI; Council Premises Space I; Council Premises Space II; Council Premises Space III; Council Premises Space VI; National Street I; National Street II; Mechanic Village I; Mechanic Village II; Mechanic Village III; Mechanic Village VI; Obiri Ogbuji Space I; Obiri Ogbuji Space II; Ejiegbu Street I; Ejiegbu Street II; Chindah Estate (By Ust) I; Chindah Estate (By Ust) II; Obiri Aholu (Wobo Street) I; Obiri Aholu (Wobo Street) II; Obiri Martins; C. S. S Nkpolu
Port Harcourt	Rumuwoji (One)	State School Rebisi Amaikibo Road I; State School Rebisi Amaikibo Road II; State School Rebisi Amaikibo Road III; State School Rebisi Amaikibo Road IV; State School Rebisi Amaikibo Road V; State School Rebisi Amaikibo Road VI; State School Rebisi Amaikibo Road VII; Obiri Wokora; Obiri Elechi I; Obiri Elechi II; Obiri Elechi III; St. Thomas School I; St. Thomas School II; St. Thomas School III; St. Thomas School VI; St. Thomas School; Okoku Hall I; Okoku Hall II; Enwume Avenue I; Enwume Avenue II; Mlle 3 Market I; Mlle 3 Market II; Obiri Okah Open Space I; Obiri Okah Open Space II; Obiri Wokom (Open Space) I; Obiri Wokom (Open Space) II; Town Hall Space (Nkpolu O Ruworuko) I; Town Hall Space (Nkpolu O Ruworuko) II; Town Hall Space (Nkpolu O Ruworuko) III; Town Hall Space (Nkpolu O Ruworuko) VI; Council Premises Space I; Council Premises Space II; Council Premises Space III; Council Premises Space VI; National Street I; National Street II; Mechanic Village I; Mechanic Village II; Mechanic Village III; Mechanic Village VI; Obiri Ogbuji Space I; Obiri Ogbuji Space II; Ejiegbu Street I; Ejiegbu Street II; Chindah Estate (By Ust) I; Chindah Estate (By Ust) II; Obiri Aholu (Wobo Street) I; Obiri Aholu (Wobo Street) II; Obiri Martins; C. S. S Nkpolu
Port Harcourt	Rumuwoji (Two)	Rumuwoji Hall (Open Spcae) I; Rumuwoji Hall (Open Space ) II; Rumuwoji Hall (Open Space ) III; Rumuwoji Hall (Open Space ) IV; Rumuwoji Hall (Open Space ) V; Rumuwoji Hall (Open Space ) VI; Rumuwoji Hall (Open Space ) VII; Rumuwoji Hall (Open Space ) VIII; Orluogbo Hall; Abakaliki/Afikpo Open Space
Port Harcourt	Rumuwoji (Three)	St. Andrew's Primary School I; St. Andrew's Primary School II; Wobo Hall; 55 Ojike I; 55 Ojike II; Rumuowoji Town Hall; Wobo Hall Nnanka Illoabuchi I; Wobo Hall Nnanka Illoabuchi II; Wobo Hall Nnanka Illoabuchi III; Abba Street I; Abba Street III; St. Andrew's Primary School III; St. Andrew's Primary School IV
Port Harcourt	Mgbundukwu (One)	Mgbundukwu Hall I; Egede Street I; Egede Street II; Egede Street III; Egede Street IV; Egede Street V; Rumkpailu Kwuozo Hall I; Rumkpailu Kwuozo Hall II; Mgbundukwu Hall II; Mgbundukwu Hall III; Mgbundukwu Hall IV
Port Harcourt	Mgbundukwu (Two)	Tobin Hall (By Emenike Junction) I; Tobin Hall (By Emenike Junction) II; Tobin Hall (By Emenike Junction) III; Tobin Hall (By Emenike Junction) IV; Tobin Hall (By Emenike Junction) V; Tobin Hall (By Emenike Junction) VI; Tobin Hall (By Emenike Junction) VII; Tobin Hall (By Emenike Junction) VIII; Timber/Lumumba Junction I; Timber/Lumumba Junction II; Lumumba/Echue; Open Space
Port Harcourt	Rumuobiekwe Ward	St. Thomas School I; St. Thomas School II; St. Thomas School III; St. Thomas School IV; St. Thomas School V; St. Thomas School VI; Emole Street/Aneke Lane I; Emole Street/Aneke Lane II; Rumuebekwe Hall; Progressive Hall; Amadi Eken Hall; Rumuobiekwe Hall
Port Harcourt	Diobu	Sacred Heart Primary School I; Sacred Heart Primary School II; Sacred Heart Primary School III; Azikiwe /Ojoto Junction I; Azikiwe /Ojoto Junction II; Azikiwe /Ojoto Junction III; Hobobo Lane; Kenneth Commercial School I; Kenneth Commercial School II; Kenneth Commercial School III; Kenneth Commercial School IV; Kenneth Commercial School V
Port Harcourt	Nkpolu Oroworukwo Two	Near Ust Post Office Open Space I; Near Ust Post Office Open Space II; Near Ust Post Office Open Space III; Near Ust Post Office Open Space IV; Near Ust Post Office Open Space V; Obiri Orusa Open Space I; Obiri Orusa Open Space II; Obasiolu St. Ml3 I; Obasiolu St. Ml3 II; Sacred Heart School Diobu I; Sacred Heart School Diobu II; Ejigini Street Open Space I; Ejigini Street Open Space II; Obiri Emika I; Obiri Emika II; Obasiolu/Ojoto Junction Front I; Obasiolu/Ojoto Junction Front II; Wadugba Water Front; Aholu Water Front; Eagle Island
Port Harcourt	Elekahia	Igwe Hall Open Space I; Igwe Hall Open Space II; Igwe Hall Open Space III; Ndah Hall I; Ndah Hall II; Southern Grocery Frontage I; Sou Thern Grocery Frontage II; Iwezor Hall I; Iwezor Hall II; Nchelem; Dede Hall; Transamadi Urban Council I; Transamadi Urban Council II; Transamadi Urban Council III; Transamadi Urban Council IV; State School Elekahia I; State School Elekahia II; State School Elekahia III; State School Elekahia IV; State School Elekahia V; State School Elekahia VI; Bomo Hall I; Bomo Hall II; Bomo Hall III; Odum Hall I; Odum Hall II; Ilo Hall I; Ilo Hall II; Ilo Hall III; Opposite The Evening Market I; Opposite The Evening Market II; Mechanic Complex I; Mechanic Complex II; Nyeche Hall (Elekahia); Army Children School Rainbow Town I; Army Children School Rainbow Town II; Army Children School Rainbow Town III; Nyeche Hall (Elekahim) I; Nyeche Hall (Elekahim) II; Govt. Sec. School Elekahia I; Govt. Sec. School Elekahia II; Ndah Hall, Elekahia; Ochiri Hall, Elekahia
Port Harcourt	Abuloma/Amadi-Ama	Abuloma Upe I; Abuloma Upe II; Abuloma Upe III; Abuloma Upe IV; Abuloma Upe V; Abuloma Upe VI; Abuloma Upe VII; Abuloma Town Square I; Abuloma Town Square II; Abuloma Town Square III; Abuloma Town Square IV; Abuloma Town Square V; Abuloma Town Square VI; Abuloma Town Square VII; Abuloma Town Hall I; Abuloma Town Hall II; Abuloma Town Hall III; Abuloma Town Hall IV; Abuloma Town Hall V; Abuloma Town Hall VI; Abuloma Town Hall VII; F. G. G. C Abuloma; C. S. S Abuloma; Central Square Amadi-Ama I; Central Square Amadi-Ama II; Central Square Amadi-Ama III; Central Square Amadi-Ama IV; Central Square Amadi-Ama V; Central Square Amadi-Ama VI; Okura-Ama Town Square I; Okura-Ama Town Square II; State School Amadi-Ama I; State School Amadi-Ama II; State School Amadi-Ama III; State School Amadi-Ama IV; Owalou Play Ground Igbon I; State School Ozugboko-Ama I; State School Ozugboko-Ama II; State School Ozugboko-Ama III; State School Ozugboko-Ama IV; Play Ground Ozugboko; Fime-Ama Play Ground; Ukukalama Town Hall; Ukpaku Play Ground, Amadi Ama; Somari-Ama Play Ground I; Somari-Ama Play Ground II; Azuabie; Azuabie Town Square; Okuku-Ama; Azuabie (Amoni Street); Okuru-Ama; Okuru Market Square; Kokoama I; Kokoama II; Iwokiri Amadi-Ama; Okilo Road, Abuloma; C. P. S. Azuabie; Senate Village Amadi Ama
Tai	Botem/Gbeneo	Council Secretarit, Saakpenwa; C. P. S I, Botem; C. P. S II, Botem; Botem Library Open Space; Opposite Apostolic Church, Botem; Town Hall Gbene-Ue; Botem Library Open Space 11
Tai	Kpite	C. P. S. Kpite Class Room; Simziba Open Space, Kpite; Anibire Town Hall, Kpite; Kuadum J. N. Ndah Hall Kpite; Gbor Market Hall Kpite; Yaa Market Hall Kpite; Ten Yor C. S. S Hall Kpite; Si-Asaa Health Centre Kpite; A-Umloo Centre Kpite; Bue Mene Open Space Kpite; Or-Knoo Open Space Kpite; Agbara Beregu Open Space Kpite
Tai	Korokoro	Gbene Giniwa Square Open Space, Kopokoro; C. S. S Korokoro Class Room, Korokoro; C. P. S I Class Room, Korokoro; Town Square Open Space, Korokoro; Town Square Open Space, Ueken I; Town Square Open Space, Ueken II; Town Square Open Space Ueken III
Tai	Koroma/Horo	C. P. S II Class Room Koroma; C. P. S Class Room Koroma; Town Square Open Space I Koroma; Town Square Open Space II, Koroma; Opposite New Apostolic Church Koroma; Town Square, Horo
Tai	Kira/Borobara	C. P. S. Bara-Alue; Kebara Town Hall; Kebara Market Square; Beke's Square Open Space; Deyor Town Hall; Kira Deyor C. P. S 1 Town Square; C. P. S Hall Aabuen; C. Ps Hall, Borobara; C. P. S Field Square; Yirankina; Yaate's Square; Yirankina Town Hall, Borobara; Aabuen Kira Leprosy House
Tai	Gio/Kporghor/Gbam	Town Square, Gio I; Town Square, Gio II; C. P. S Hall, Gio; C. P. S Field, Gio; Town Hall, Kporghor; C. P. S. Hall, Kporghor; C. P. S., Gbam; C. P. S Field, Kporghor; Town Square, Buemene Gbam; C. P. S Class Room, Kporghor
Tai	Nonwa	Gbene Lebue Health Centre, Nonwa Kebara; Ananeme Open Space, Kebara; Police College/Fish Farm Police Field; Town Hall; Buezor Town Hall; Sps III Field; Amaabana Town Hall; C. P. S II, Uedume; Zongon Ndewe Hall, Uedume; State School Open Space; Town Hall, Uedume; Temaa Uedume Square; Bible College Field, Nonwa
Tai	Bubu/Bara/Kani	C. P. S I Sibue Class Room Bunu; Bara Kara Town Hall, Bunu; Kpete Centre (Market Hall) Bunu; Ss 11 Zogon Norkpo Classroom Bunu; Ss 11 Classroom Bunu; C. Ps Kanni Classroom, Bunu; Mayde Crusade Mission, Bunu; Kegbare Health Centre Bunu
Tai	Ban-Ogoi	Bala-Ban-Ogo Town Square, Banogoi; Bootem Town Square, Ban-Ogoi; C. S. S Ban-Ogoi Class Room, Ban-Ogoi; Town Square Ban-Ogoi; C. P. S Ban-Ogoi Class Room; Town Square Open Space Emu; Town Square Open Space Aabue
