= List of cities and towns in Rivers State =

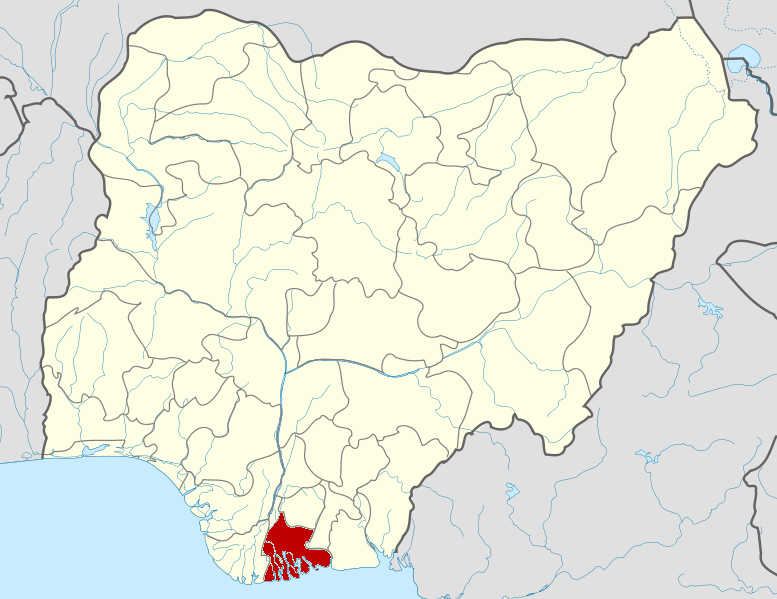
Location of Rivers State in Nigeria

This is a list of populated places in Rivers State, Nigeria. It is not complete but includes the most populated cities, towns and villages.

- Abara
- Abalama
- Abonnema
- Abuloma
- Afam
- Ahoada
- Akinima
- Akpajo
- Akuku Toru
- Alakahia
- Alone
- Alesa
- Aleto
- Aluu
- Amadi
- Andoni
- Ataba
- Bane
- Bille
- Bodo
- Bonny
- Bonny Island
- Bori
- Buguma
- Choba
- Diobu
- Degema Town
- Eberi
- Ebubu
- Elele
- Elelenwo
- Elekahia
- Eleme
- Eliozu
- Emelego
- Emohua
- Etche
- Eteo
- Gokana
- Igwuruta
- Igbo-Etche
- Ikwerre
- Iwofe
- Kula
- Mbiama
- Nchia
- Nkoro
- Nkpogwu
- Obigbo
- Odiabidi
- Ogbogoro
- Ogu Bolo
- Okehi
- Okobie
- Okoloma
- Okomoko
- Okrika
- Omoku
- Onne
- Opobo
- Oyorokoto
- Oyigbo
- Marine Base
- Mgboba
- Port Harcourt (capital and largest city)
- Rumuchakara
- Rumuekini
- Rumuoigbo
- Rumuomasi
- Rumuodara
- Rumuodomaya
- Rumuokoro
- Rumuokwuta
- Rumuola
- Rumuobiakani
- Woji
- Umuagbai
- Umuru
- Usokun-Degema
- Unyeada Kingdom

== See also ==
- List of villages in Rivers State
