= Akpor =

Traditional Kingdom in Rivers State, Nigeria

Coordinates: 4°51′54″N 6°56′00″E

Akpor Kingdom Ali Akpor Akpor Ancient Kingdom
- Traditional state
- Nickname: Akpor Kingdom
- Motto: Akpor Bu Otu
- Location in Nigeria
- Country: Nigeria
- State: Rivers State
- His Royal Majesty: 2022

Government
  - Type: Monarch
  - Nye-nwe-ali: Eze Levi Orlu Ozuowuowu Oriebe

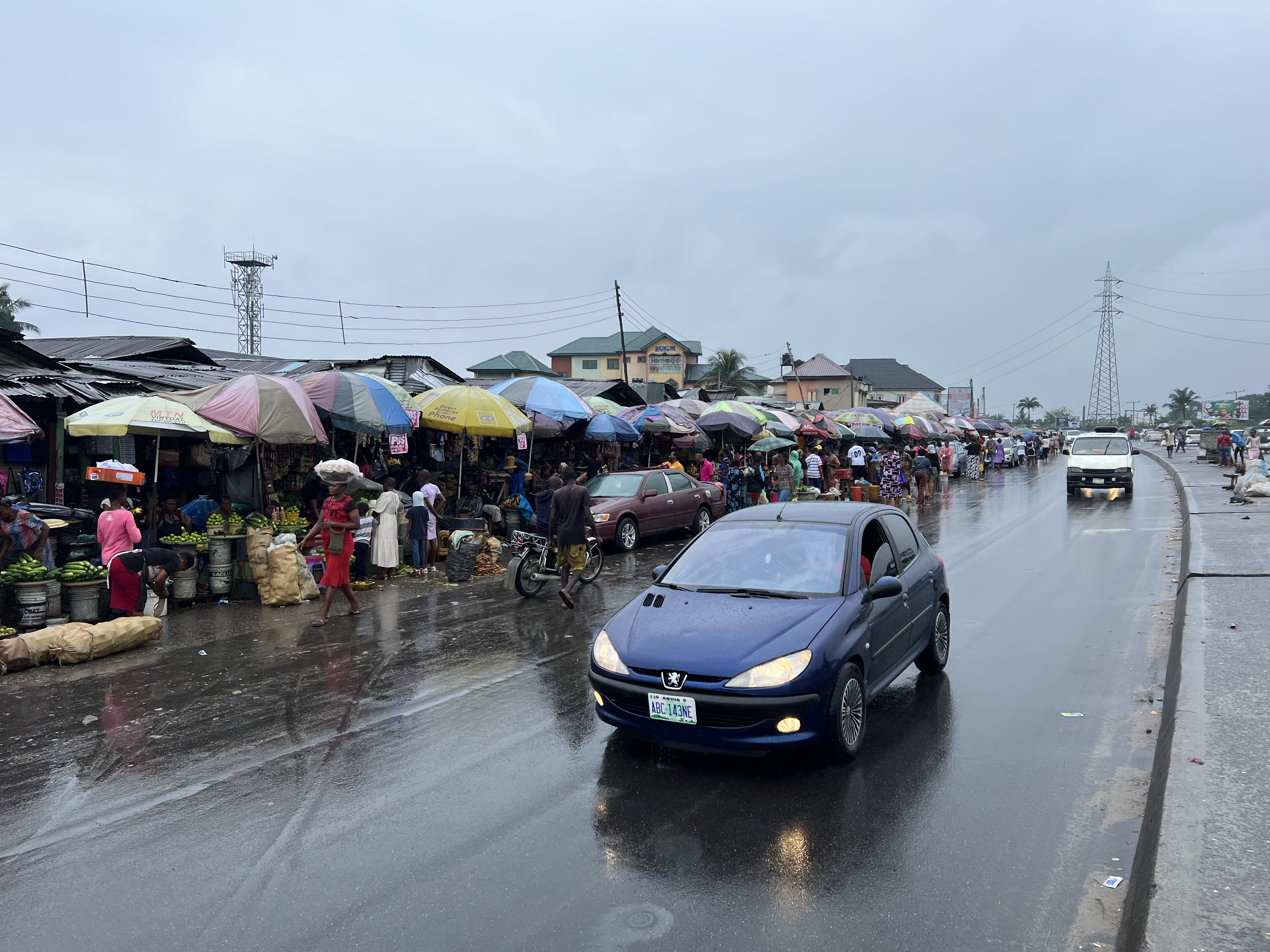

Akpor is a traditional kingdom of the Ikwerre people located in Obio-Akpor Local Government Area of Rivers State, Nigeria. The kingdom forms part of the Port Harcourt metropolitan area within the Niger Delta region of Southern Nigeria. Akpor is bordered by the Ikwerre clans of Aluu and Igwuruta to the north, Obio to the east, Port Harcourt to the south, and the Choba River to the west.

Akpor Kingdom comprises ten communities: Ozuoba, Rumuokparali, Rumuosi, Rumualogu, Rumuokwachi, Alakahia, Rumuekini, Choba, Akami (Ogbogoro), and Rumuorlumeni (Iwofe). Ozuoba serves as the traditional headquarters of the kingdom. The traditional ruler of Akpor bears the title Nyewe-Ali, with Eze Levi Orlu Ozuowuowu Oriebe serving as the current monarch.

The kingdom is characterized by low-lying and arable terrain, tropical rainforest vegetation, and freshwater systems associated with the Niger Delta environment. Historically, the people of Akpor engaged primarily in agriculture, fishing, palm produce harvesting, hunting, and local trade, particularly in communities located near the Choba River.

Akpor maintains traditional political and cultural institutions including the Ogbako Elejiowho village council, the Ohna Akpor clan assembly and Akpor Assembly, and its most cultural organizations the Oghnuruwhu Akpor Cultural Organization both of which historically played significant roles in community administration and governance. The people of Akpor speak the Ikwerre language and preserve cultural traditions and social structures that continue to influence community life within the kingdom. Ozuoba is the traditional headquarters of Akpor Kingdom. The current ruler ("Nye-nwe-Ali") of Akpor is Eze Levi Orlu Ozuowuowu Oriebe.

== History ==
There are several theories regarding the origin of Akpor Kingdom. One of the predominant traditions holds that the Akpor people are autochthonous to their present location, having no known pre-colonial migration from outside Ikwerreland. Other historical accounts and oral traditions trace the origin of Akpor to the Benin Empire, stating that the founding ancestor, Akpor, was a son of Iwhuruoha who migrated from Benin during the reign of Oba Ewuare.

Historically, Akpor developed as one of the traditional Ikwerre kingdoms within present-day Rivers State. The kingdom was organized around indigenous political, social, and spiritual institutions which guided administration, conflict resolution, land ownership, and communal life. Traditional authority in Akpor was centered on the Nyewe-Ali, the monarch and spiritual head of the kingdom, who was regarded as the custodian of culture, tradition, and ancestral heritage.

In the pre-colonial period, the Nyewe-Ali occupied both religious and political roles within the kingdom. The monarch was traditionally installed through spiritual rites and divination associated with the Rukani Akpor oracle. The office of the Nyewe-Ali was considered sacred, and the monarch was viewed as a symbolic representative of ancestral authority within the community.

Akpor society historically operated through structured indigenous institutions including the Ogbako Elejiowho, a village council composed of elders and Owho holders representing various families and compounds, and the Ohna Akpor, a clan assembly headed by the Nyewe-Ali alongside village heads and community representatives. These institutions played important roles in governance, administration, dispute settlement, and the preservation of customs and traditions.

The economy of pre-colonial Akpor was largely based on agriculture, fishing, hunting, palm produce harvesting, craft-making, palm wine tapping, and local trade. Fertile land and access to freshwater systems supported farming and fishing activities, particularly in communities located near the Choba River. Traditional occupations and communal practices contributed significantly to the social and economic development of the kingdom.

During the colonial and post-colonial periods, Akpor experienced gradual urbanization and increased interaction with neighboring communities and the growing city of Port Harcourt. The expansion of transportation networks, educational institutions, and commercial activities within Obio-Akpor contributed to the transformation of several communities within the kingdom into important urban and semi-urban settlements.

== Geography ==
Akpor Kingdom is located within Obio-Akpor Local Government Area of Rivers State, Nigeria, in the coastal Niger Delta region of southern Nigeria. It lies within the Port Harcourt metropolitan area and occupies a strategically positioned landscape that connects several major urban and semi-urban settlements in the state.

The kingdom is bordered by the Ikwerre clans of Aluu and Igwuruta to the north, Obio to the east, Port Harcourt city to the south, and the Choba River to the west. Its location places it at the interface between rapidly expanding urban development and traditional rural settlements within the greater Port Harcourt region.

Akpor is made up of ten communities: Rumuokparali, Ozuoba, Rumuosi, Rumualogu, Rumuokwachi, Alakahia, Rumuekini, Choba, Akami (Ogbogoro), and Rumuorlumeni (Iwofe). These communities are interconnected through road networks and shared economic, cultural, and administrative systems, with Ozuoba serving as the traditional headquarters.

The physical landscape of Akpor Kingdom is characterized by low-lying terrain typical of the Niger Delta, with areas of arable land, freshwater swamps, and seasonal wetlands. The region experiences a tropical monsoon climate with high humidity and heavy rainfall for most of the year, supporting both natural vegetation and agricultural activity.

Several natural water bodies, including the Choba River and associated streams and drainage channels, influence the geography of the kingdom. These waterways historically supported fishing, transportation, and farming activities in nearby communities.

Over time, significant portions of Akpor's natural environment have been transformed by urbanization linked to the expansion of Port Harcourt and Obio-Akpor. This has led to the development of residential estates, educational institutions, commercial centers, and transport infrastructure, particularly in communities such as Choba, Alakahia, and Ozuoba.

Despite this urban expansion, parts of Akpor still retain elements of its original rainforest vegetation and wetland ecosystems, reflecting the broader environmental characteristics of the Niger Delta region.

== Composition and Governance ==
Akpor Kingdom is composed of ten traditional communities which form its socio-political structure. Ozuoba is regarded as the ancestral headquarters of the kingdom and occupies a central position in its traditional organization.

Each community is traditionally headed by its own Nyewe-Ali, who serves as the custodian of local customs, traditions, and governance. These community rulers collectively form the Ogbako Elejiowho, which functions as a council of traditional authorities representing the entire kingdom.

The Ogbako Elejiowho operates as a village-level governance structure that oversees local administration and cultural matters within each community. Above this structure is the Ohna Akpor, the highest traditional assembly of the kingdom, which brings together the community monarchs and selected representatives to address kingdom-wide issues.

At the apex of the system is the central Nyewe-Ali of Akpor Kingdom, who serves as the symbolic head and custodian of the entire traditional institution. The governance structure reflects a decentralized system that balances community autonomy with centralized cultural authority.
