= Ikwerre people =

Ethnic group in Rivers State, Nigeria

Ikwerre
Iwhuruọhna
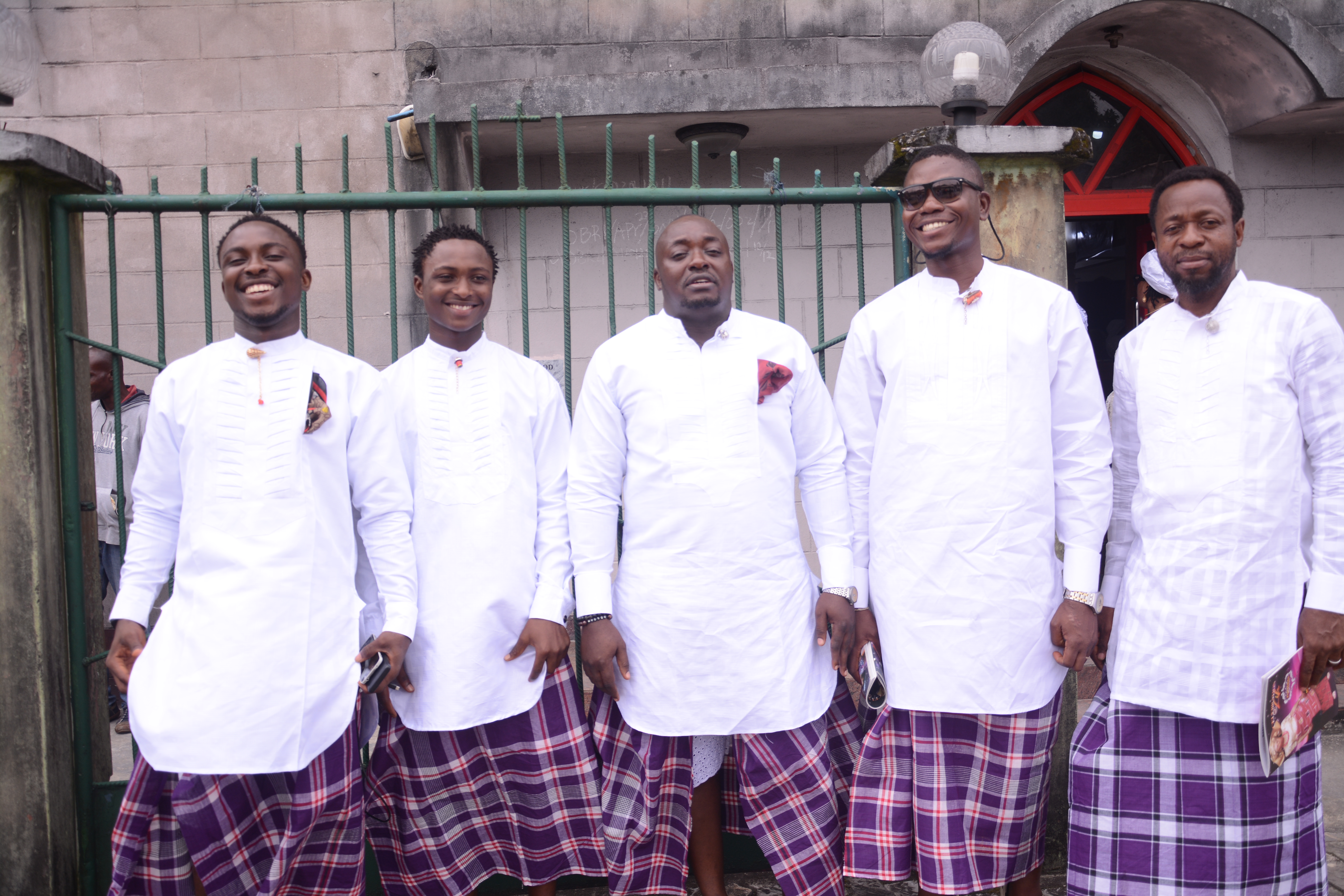
- A group of Ikwerre men in their cultural attire

Regions with significant populations
- Rivers State, Nigeria

Languages
- Igboid language: Ikwerre

Religion
- Christianity, Omeneli

Related ethnic groups
- Igbo, Etche, Ogba, Ekpeye

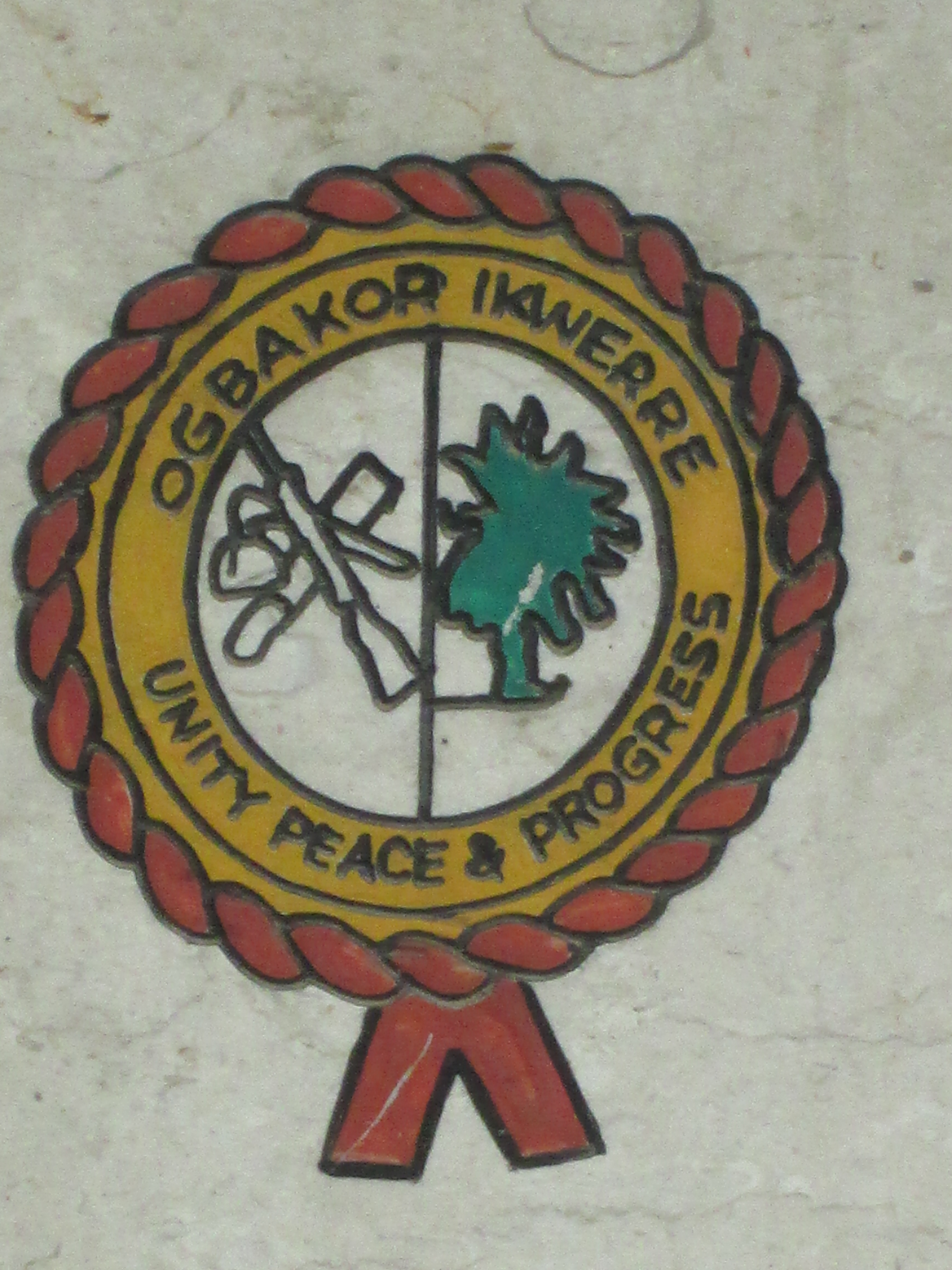
Emblem of Ogbakor Ikwerre

The Ikwerre, natively known as Iwhuruọhna, is an ethnic group speaking an Igboid language, found in Rivers State, Nigeria. The group is spread across four Local Government Areas: Port Harcourt, Obio-Akpor, Ikwerre, and Emohua.

Traditional history has classified Ikwerre into seven groups called "Ikwerre Essa". They are Elele, Isiokpo, Rumuji, Emohua, Choba, Aluu, Igwuruta and Obio group. This division was first documented by Forde and Jones (1950) in their ethnographic study of the Igboid- and Ibibio-speaking peoples of South-Eastern Nigeria. It was also in line with this grouping that seven customary courts were established in Ikwerre during the Colonial administration. These courts were located at Elele, Isiokpo, Rumuji, Emohua, Choba, Aluu and Obio in Ikwerreland.

== Geography and cultural grouping ==
The Ikwerre inhabit the upland part of Rivers State. and are predominantly settled in the Ikwerre, Obio-Akpor, Port Harcourt and Emohua local government areas of Rivers State.

The Ikwerre cultural area is bordered by Ogba to the northwest, the Ekpeye and Abua to the west, the Ijoid groups of Degema, the Kalabari and Okrika to the south, the Eleme and Oyigbo to the southeast and the Etche to the east.

The Ikwerre are made up of four main groups, namely the Elele group (Ishimbam), the Igwuruta-Aluu (Ishiali) group, the Rumuji-Emohua-Ogbakiri (REO) or Risimini group, and the OPA group (Obio/Port Harcourt/Akpor).

The Ishimbam or Elele clan cluster is located at the northern part of Ikwerre land, in Ikwerre and Emohua Local Government Areas.

The Ishimbam clans include: Elele, Akpabu, Elele-Alimini, Egbeda, Omerelu, Apani, Ubimini and Omudioga. The Ishiali or Esila group inhabit the remaining parts of Ikwerre Local Government Area. Clans here include: Isiokpo, Ipo, Igwuruta-Ali, Aluu, Omuanwa, Omademe, Omagwa, Ozuoha and Ubima.

The REO (Rumuji/Emohua/Ogbakiri) cluster, or (R)Ishimini (as classified by Ogbakor Ikwerre), inhabit the southern part of Emohua Local Government Area. They are located in a riverine area. This cluster comprises:

- Odegu clan:
  - Rumuji
  - Rumuodogo
  - Ovogo
  - Evekwu
  - Rumuewhor
- Ndele
- Rumuekpe
- Uvuahu clan:
  - Ibaa
  - Obelle
- Emohua clan
- Ogbakiri clan

The OPA (Obio-Port Harcourt-Akpor) is a broad cluster that occupies the entire Obio/Akpor and Port Harcourt Local Government Areas. It is subdivided into the Obio and the Akpor groups.

- Obio: The Obio group is divided into three: Evo, Apara and Rebisi (Port Harcourt). Obio is regarded as the common ancestor of the Evo and Apara communities; Evo is the senior while Apara is younger.
  - Evo: This is subdivided into three:
    - Oroâ€“Evo: (Rumuodomanya, Rumurorlu, Oginigba, Rumuobiakani, Rumuobochi, Woji, Rumuibekwe, Rumuogba)
    - Oro â€“ Esara: (Okporo:{Rumuokwurusi, Rumuodara, Iriebe}, Rumuokoro, Orogwe, Atali)
    - Oropotoma: (Rumuomasi and Elelenwo)
  - Apara: Apara, the second son of Obio, had nine children: Eneka, Nkpoku, Ekinigbo, Okwuta, Adaolu (a daughter), Epirikom, Ola, Orosi, and Rebisi. These descendants founded the principal Apara communities of Eneka, Rukpokwu, Rumuigbo, Rumuokwuta, Rumuadaolu, Rumuepirikom, Rumuola, and Rumuorosi, respectively. Rumueme was established in the Apara territory, after Ozuruoha, one of Epirikom's descendants had invited his in-laws from Isiokpo to help him wage a war against his kinsman. Rumueme is said to be where these warriors from Isiokpo had resided permanently. Rumuomoi also joined in the said war and is believed to come from Isiokpo and joined Apara later.
  - Rebisi: This is an offshoot of the Apara clan. Rebisi had fled Apara during a conflict with his brothers. Rebisi had seven children: Ochiri, Adasobia, Olozu, Worukwo, Ezimgbu, Ogbum and Abali. The descendants founded: Orochiri, Oroada, Orolozu, Oroworukwo, Oromerezimgbu, and Ogbumnuabali (a merger of Orogbum and Oroabali), respectively. Internal migrations led to the establishment of other communities from the original seven, such as Elekahia. Others are Nkpogu, Nkpolu Oroworukwo, Nkpolu Orogbum, Rumuwoji, Rumukalagbo, Oroije, Rumuibekwe and Orominieke.
- Akpor: Akpor is located east of the REO group, south of the Ishiali group and west of Obio. The clan has ten communities: Ozuoba, Choba (Isoba), Ogbogoro, Rumuosi, Rumuolumeni, Rumuokparali, Rumualaogu, Rumuokwachi, Rumuekini and Alakahia.

== Origin ==
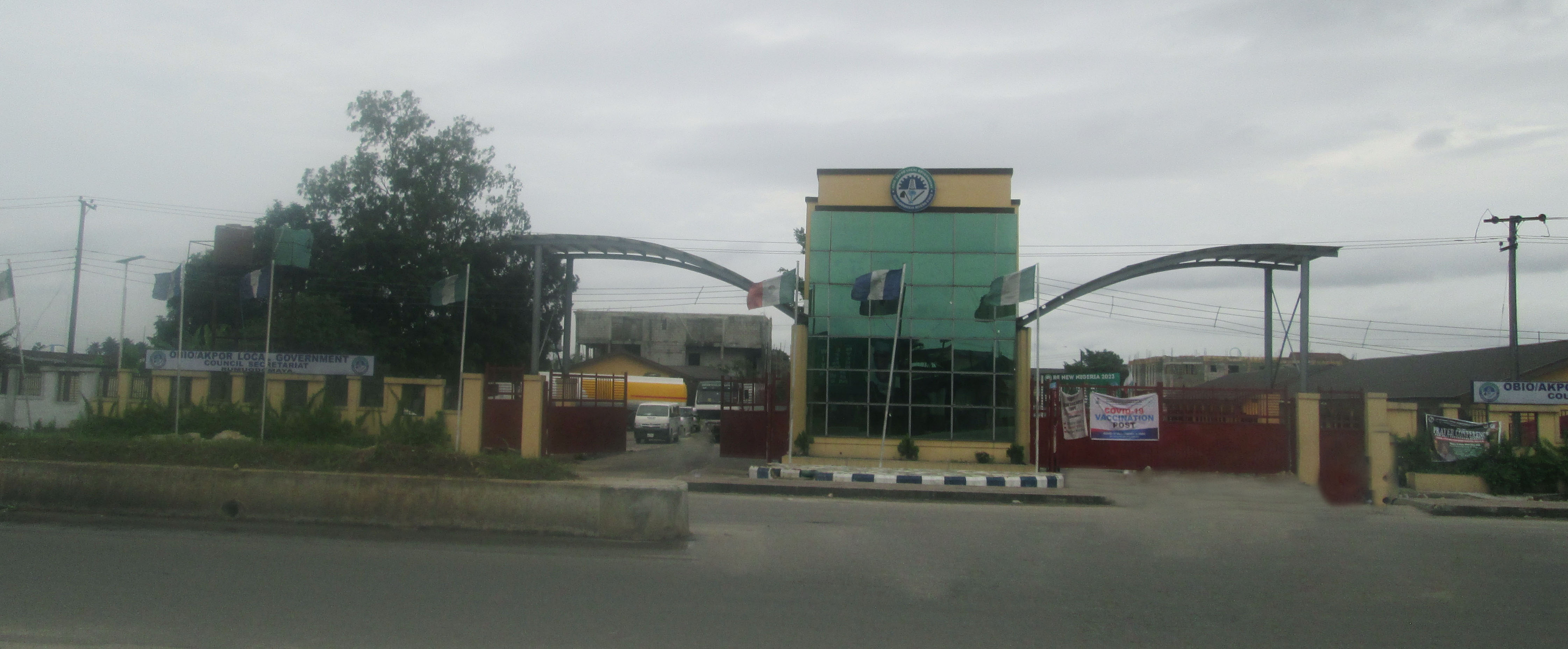
Main Gate, Obio-Akpor Local Government Area

The ancestral name of the Ikwerre people is Iwhuruohna in Ikwerre language. The history of the Ikwerre people is vast with Aborigine Hypothesis and Internal Migration theories.The paramount rulers in Ikwerre Land are united in what is known as Ogbakor Ikwerre, which was formed in 1963 as an umbrella socio-cultural organization of the Ikwerre people.

== Ethnic and linguistic identity dispute ==
The classification of the Ikwerre as an Igbo or Igboid-related group, as opposed to a wholly distinct ethnic nationality, has been a subject of long-running dispute among scholars, Ikwerre community organisations, and Igbo socio-cultural bodies.

Linguistically, lexicostatistical analysis has grouped Ikwerre together with Ekpeye, Ogba, Etche, and Igbo as a related language cluster, sometimes termed the "lower Niger group of languages," which the analysis characterises as likely Igboid. This linguistic classification is separate from, and does not by itself resolve, the question of ethnic self-identification, which some Ikwerre organisations dispute.

Historically, the ethnographic survey by Forde and Jones (1950) situates Ikwerre among the Igbo/Ibo-speaking groups of South-Eastern Nigeria. The 2004 autobiography of Oba Erediauwa of Benin, who served as a colonial District Officer in the Ahoada district (which includes Ikwerre and Etche areas) during the 1950s and 1960s, also describes the Ikwerre and Etche as belonging to the Igbo cultural and linguistic family.

The dispute has periodically taken on political dimensions. In January 2025, Ohanaeze Ndigbo, the pan-Igbo socio-cultural organisation, elected Senator John Azuta-Mbata, an Ikwerre man of the Eneka clan, as its President-General, the first Ikwerre person to hold the position. His election renewed public debate over Ikwerre identity: the Ogbakor Ikwerre Cultural Organisation Worldwide publicly disowned Azuta-Mbata and purported to strip him of Ikwerre chieftaincy titles, arguing that by accepting the Ohanaeze Ndigbo presidency he had renounced his Ikwerre identity, while other Ikwerre groups, including the Committee of Rivers Patriots, rejected the expulsion as procedurally invalid.

Former Rivers State Governor Rotimi Amaechi has articulated differing positions on his own ethnic identity at different points in his public career. At his 2015 Senate confirmation hearing, Amaechi identified himself as an "Ikwerre prince." That same year, at an APC presidential campaign event in Aba, Abia State, Amaechi told the crowd, "I am a bona fide Igbo man," contrasting his own name with that of then-President Goodluck Jonathan, who Amaechi said could not speak the Igbo language despite bearing the name Azikiwe. Ahead of the 2023 general election, when Amaechi contested the All Progressives Congress presidential primary, his candidacy was welcomed by figures within Ohanaeze Ndigbo and described by commentators as that of an ethnic Igbo man from the Niger Delta, meeting calls for a Nigerian president "of Ndi Igbo extraction." In a June 2025 interview on Arise Television, however, Amaechi said his earlier public claim to an Igbo identity had been a political protest against the treatment of the South-East rather than a statement of ethnic fact, saying "I'm an Ikwerre man" and that "is an Ikwerre man an Igbo man? There are divergent views. The majority will say no, but there is a very tiny minority which includes me." He said he had worn Igbo attire, including the "Tiger head cloth" (isi-agu) and red cap, "in protest asking Nigerians to address their problems."

A group calling itself the Indigenous Igbo Council (IIC) of Rivers State has organised publicly around the position that Ikwerre, Etche, Ogba, Ekpeye, and other upland Rivers State communities are ethnically Igbo. In February 2025, the IIC issued a statement asserting that "the entirety of the Igbo nation recognizes" these groups "as part and parcel of the greater Igbo nation," and announced the formation of an Indigenous Igbo Council of Rivers State to align with Ohanaeze Ndigbo. In July 2025, the IIC organised an "IgboFest" cultural festival in Port Harcourt, which drew opposition from the Ikwerre People's Association, a group that petitioned police to prevent the event on the grounds that it would cause a breakdown of law and order.

The question of Ikwerre identity has also surfaced within Nigeria's broader and long-running debate over federal restructuring and the creation of additional states. Since the Nigerian Civil War, South-East Igbo leaders and groups such as IPOB and MASSOB have argued that the South-East geopolitical zone, which has five states compared to six or more in other zones, is under-represented, and have periodically called for the creation of an additional South-East state and for closer political integration with Igbo-speaking communities in neighbouring states, including Rivers State. Some Ikwerre and other Rivers State community organisations have resisted being characterised as part of this Igbo political bloc, viewing such integration as a threat to a distinct Rivers State or Niger Delta minority identity.

== Establishments in Ikwerre land ==
"The acquisition of Ikwerre land began in 1913 by the British colonial government when it acquired a parcel of land from the Rebisi clan of Diobu because the then colonial government wanted to develop a harbor in the area. Once the sea port was established, the place became busy with commerce and trade and with a beehive of activities.

In recent times, as the tempo of oil and gas exploration increased in Rivers State, it invariably put more pressure on Ikwerre land and its resources. As land was needed for development purposes within Port Harcourt and its environs, it was natural to turn to Ikwerre people who inhabit Port Harcourt and the surrounding territories.

== Leadership structure ==
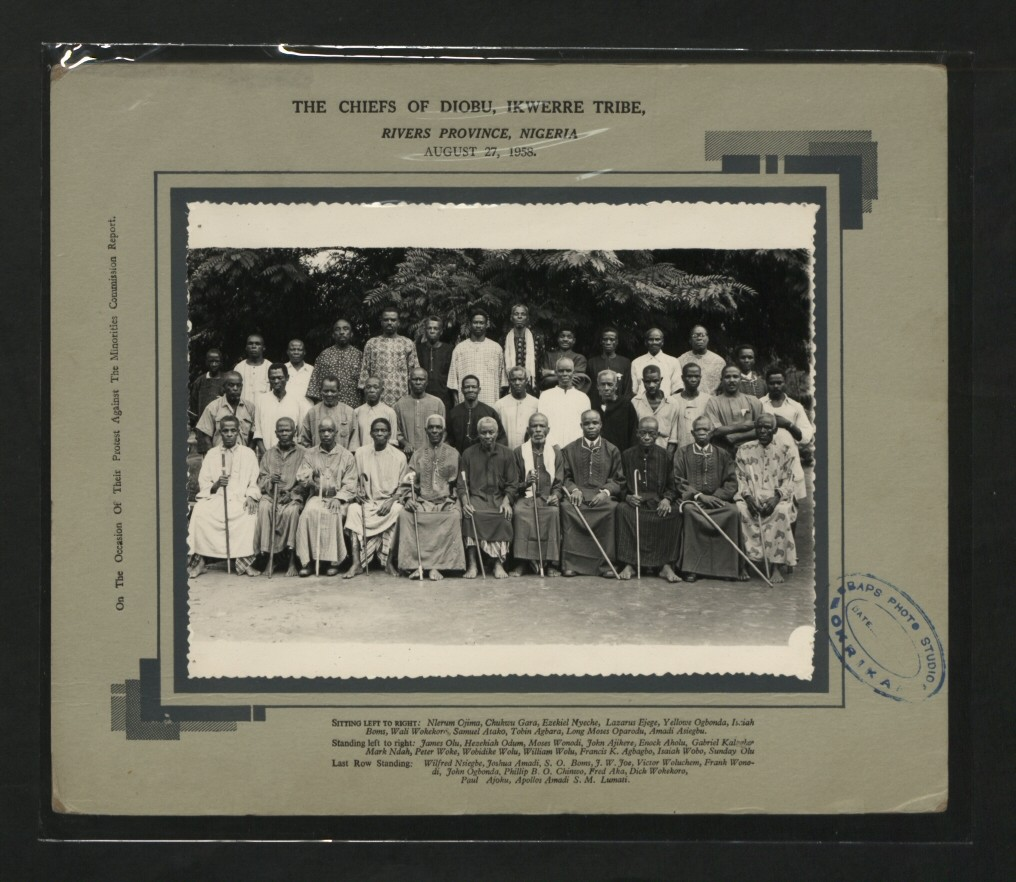
The Chiefs of Diobu, Ikwerre tribe, August 27, 1958.

The Ikwerre exist in well-delineated clans, with each clan having its own paramount king. The Ikwerre do not have an overall paramount ruler or king, but designated kings, rulers or leaders mostly approved by their constituents. However, all paramount rulers in Ikwerre are united in what is known as Ogbakor Ikwerre, which was formed in 1963 as an umbrella socio-cultural organization of the Ikwerre people.

== Ikwerre land and industrial activities ==
The Ikwerre play host to several multinational oil-producing and servicing companies, in addition to many other industries and establishments. Despite these, the Ikwerre, like nearly all other minorities of the Niger Delta, frequently complain of marginalisation by the oil operatives.

"The Ikwerre community faced problems of marginalization, extreme poverty and environmental degradation of its land and rivers in the Niger Delta through the exploitation of oil and gas resources. Calls were made for the full participation of the Ikwerre people in the control of resources and decision-making on development; the urgent provision of electricity; improved health care and education services; and youth employment opportunities."

== Notable people ==
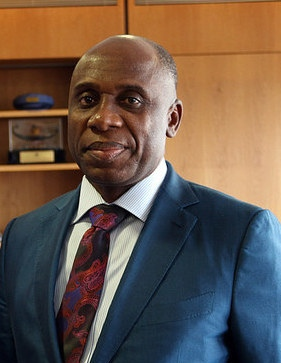
Rotimi Amaechi

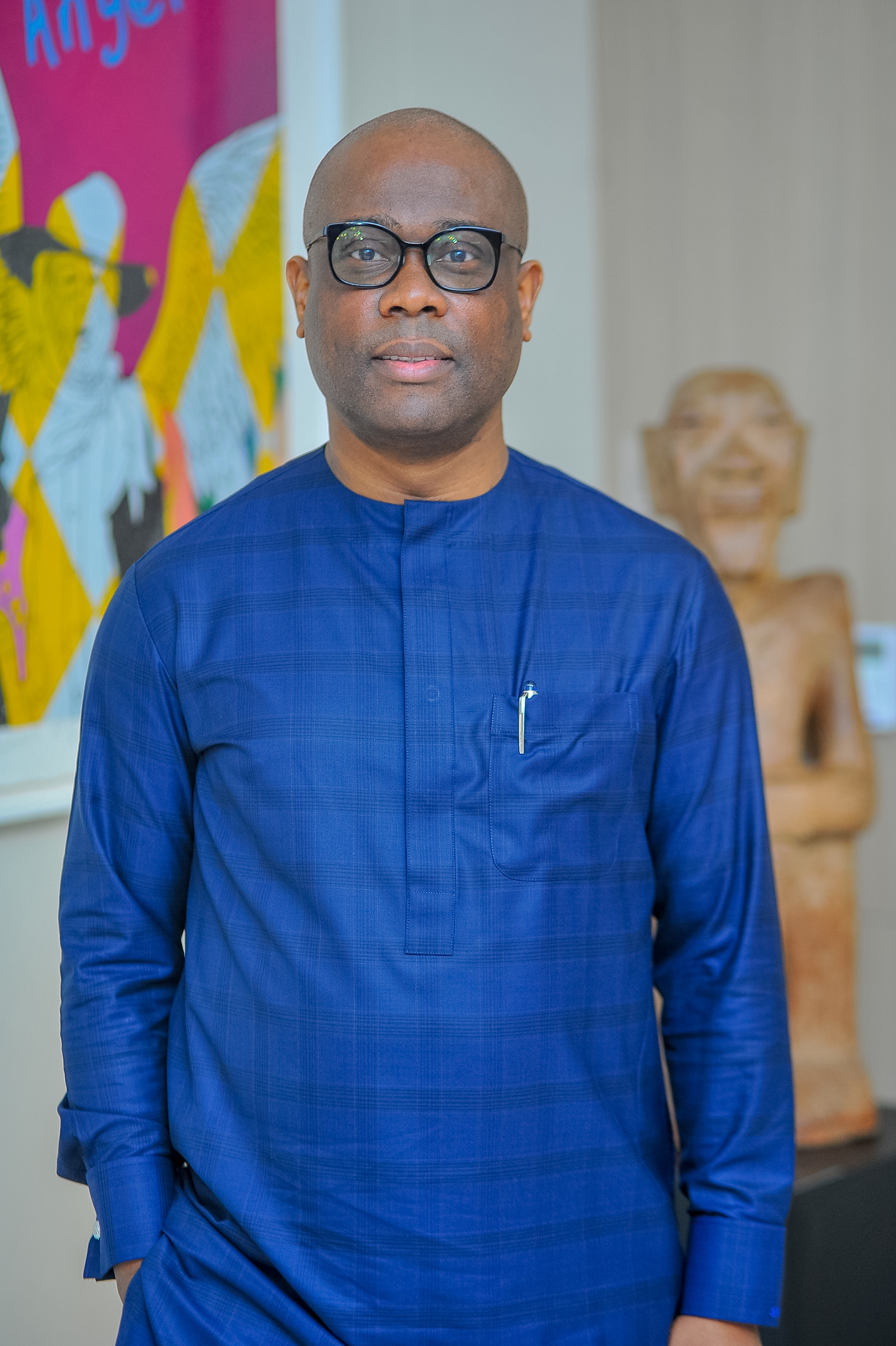
Herbert Wigwe

- Simeon Chituru Achinewhu, biochemist, scholar and university administrator
- Elechi Amadi, writer
- Rotimi Amaechi, former Governor, Rivers State, and former, Minister of Transportation
- Thankgod Amaefule (born 1984), soccer player
- Kingsley Chinda, minority leader, House of Representatives
- Monalisa Chinda, actress
- Mercy Chinwo, gospel musician
- Gift Ugochukwu Christopher (G.U.C) gospel music minister
- Tonto Dikeh, actress, musician, and politician
- Frank Eke, Nigerian medical doctor and politician. He was the first Deputy Governor of Rivers State and Ikwerre man to study at Harvard University USA
- Wisdom Budu Ihunwo, Bishop, Anglican Diocese of Niger Delta North,
- Omah Lay, musician
- Duncan Mighty, musician
- Nlerum Sunday Okogbule, Vice-Chancellor Rivers State University
- Celestine Omehia, former governor of Rivers State
- Emmanuel Onunwor, former mayor of East Cleveland, Ohio, US
- Austin Opara, former Deputy Speaker of Nigeria's House of Representatives
- Obi Wali, professor, and politician
- Herbert Wigwe, CEO, Access Bank PLC
- Nyesom Wike, former governor of Rivers State, and Minister of the FCT

== See also ==
- Rebisi
- Indigenous peoples of Rivers State
