= Rumuosi =

Community in Nigeria

Rumuosi is a community located in Obio-Akpor Local Government Area of Rivers State, Nigeria.

== Description ==
Rumuosi shares boundary with Alakahia, Rumuolaogu, Ozuoba, Rumuekini, and Choba. Rumuosi is one of 17 electoral wards administered by the Obio-Akpor Local Government Council.

Rumuosi was originally an Ikwerre village on the outer fringes of Port Harcourt, governed by a paramount king. The current king is HRH Eze Titus Bekweri Okemini Akani.
