= Ozuoba =

Coordinates: 4°51′54″N 6°56′00″E

Ozuoba Port Harcourt is a town in Obio/Akpor Local Government Area in Rivers State, Nigeria.

== Description ==
Ozuoba as a town shares boundaries with Choba, Rumuosi, Ogbogoro and NTA. Ozuoba is one of 17 electoral wards administered by the Obio-Akpor Local Government Council.

Ozuoba was originally an Ikwerre village on the outer fringes of Port Harcourt, governed by a paramount king. The current King is His Royal Majesty Eze Ozuowuowu Levi Amos Oriebe JP.

The National Open University of Nigeria is situated in Obiri-ikwerre Junction, NTA/Choba Road, Ozuoba, Rivers State. Ozuoba is located 469.2 km/291.5 miles from Abuja, Nigeria's Federal capital territory.
