= Eliozu =

Town in Rivers State

Eliozu is a town located in Obio-Akpor Local Government Area of Port Harcourt, Rivers State, Nigeria. It is situated along the East-West Road, one of the major highways in Rivers State. The area is known for its residential and commercial developments.

== Geography and location ==
Eliozu is located in the southeastern part of Port Harcourt, the capital of Rivers State. It lies along the East-West Road, which enhances its accessibility to other areas of the city and neighboring communities. The neighborhood is bordered by Rumuodara, Rumuokoro, and Rumuepirikom, which are also within the Obio-Akpor region. Its Zip Code is 500102.
