= Rumuekini =

Community in Akpor Kingdom

Rumuekini is a community located in Akpor Kingdom of Obio/Akpor Local Government Area in Rivers State, Nigeria. Rumuekini as a community shares boundaries with Rumuosi, Aluu, Choba, Ozuoba. Rumuekini community is one of the communities listed where the ring road construction project in Rivers State is taking place.

Rumuekini is a community that is close to the University of Port Harcourt, which is a residence for some staff and students of the University.

== Flood/Crisis ==
In the year 2017, report has it that flood affected Rumuekini community which led to the over 200 residents of Rumodu, in Rumuekini Community becoming homeless and stopped several school children from attending school. Mr. John Nnamdi Ohor who was the Chairman of Rumodu Land Development Committee also said that from observation, the flood was as a result of lack of proper drainages at the construction work at Obiri/Ikwere Airport Road, and Ada-George Road.

In the same year, the people of Rumuekin had a clash with the people of Ogbogoro community which led to the destruction and loss of property in Rumuekini community. This invasion by the people of Ogbogoro was as a result of the death of one of the indigenes of Ogbogoro, whose corpse was found between the boundary of Aluu and Rumuekini.
