= Rebisi =

Rebisi is a traditional kingdom of the Ikwerre people in what is today Nigeria. It is located in Port Harcourt (local government area) and comprises the localities of Orolozu, Oroabali, Orogbum, Oroworukwo, Oromeruezimgbu, Oroada and Orochiri. As a result of his brevity in conquering several wars, he expanded and allocated lands to all his children to reflect, Oro (houses) as an adjective to qualify what is today known communities respectively. These house's now communities (Oro) today were strategically located in port harcourt to wage war against encroachment on Rebisi territory.

The traditional ruler who is the paramount king of Port Harcourt metropolis is the occupant of the Eze Apara Rebisi stool and serves as the intermediary between the Rebisi people of Port Harcourt and the government.

== History of Rebisi ==
Rebisi people are descendants of Apara as the 9th child.Rebisi speak Ikwerre language Ikwerre language. Rebisi people reside in Port Harcourt Permanently. The people of Rebisi in Port harcourt practice democracy under the rule of a king (Eze) and gerontocracy. Rebisi is bounded by several other communities and tribes in Rivers State, from the Northern part has the okirikans, the Eastern past has kalabaris while the western and southern part of Rebisi has the Obio Akpor clan, an Ikwerre speaking people. Development first came into Rebisi in Port Harcourt about 18th centuries when the European merchant built Port Harcourt. Rebisi is blessed with numerous natural resources as the present Rivers State government house, companies, institutions and organization is situated in Rebisi. The people are predominantly farmers, fishermen and crafts men and women. Their children are scattered all over the globe. The presence of Multinational corporations and organizations in the area today affect the identity of the people. The headquarters of the Nigerian police, the Nigerian Navy, even the Rivers State University are situated in Rebisi Port Harcourt.

== List of rulers of Rebisi ==
- HRM Eze Elikwu Ekaninwo, Eze Epara Rebisi IV
- HRM Eze Elikwu Ekaninwo Mati, Eze Epara Rebisi V
- HRM Eze Elikwu Woruji, Eze Epara Rebisi VI
- HRM Eze Elikwu Dike, Eze Epara Rebisi VII
- HRM Eze Elikwu Worluchem, Eze Epara Rebisi VIII
- HRM Eze Phillip Elikwu, Eze Epara Rebisi IX
- HRM Eze Victor Weli Woluchem, Eze Epara Rebisi X
- HRM Eze Sunday Nnanta Woluchem, Eze Epara Rebisi XI
- HRM Eze Victor Nnanna Woluchem, JP, Eze Epara Rebisi XII.
