= Rumuokwurusi =

Town in Rivers State, Nigeria

Rumuokwurusi is a town in Obio-Akpor Local Government Area of Rivers State, Nigeria.

The town houses the famous oil mill market which is a mid week market and one of the biggest markets in Port Harcourt. The town also houses one of the newly constructed flyovers in Rivers State. The flyover connects Rumuokoro, Aba road, Akpajo and Rumuodara axis of Port Harcourt. The flyover was built by Julius Berger Nigeria PLC and commissioned by Nyesom Wike during his tenure as Rivers State Governor.
