= Anglican Diocese of Evo =

Anglican diocese in Nigeria

The Anglican Diocese of Evo is one of ten within the Anglican Province of the Niger Delta, itself one of 14 ecclesiastical provinces within the Church of Nigeria. The current bishop is the Right Rev. Innocent Ordu. Ordo was consecrated a bishop on July 12, 2009, at St Peter's, Yenagoa and the diocese was inaugurated the next day at All Saints' Cathedral, Rumuokwurusi.
