= Rumuobiakani =

Rumuobiokani is a community and residential neighbourhood in Obio-Akpor Local Government Area in Rivers State, Nigeria.

Rumuobiokani community shares boundaries with Rumuomasi, Trans Amadi, Rumuogba and Woji.

Eze Samuel Nyeche Ejims is the paramount ruler of Rumuobiokani community.

== Development ==
Rumuobiokani community industries include Shell Petroleum Development Company of Nigeria Limited and Imran Roofing and properties.

The remodeled Crowther Memorial Primary and Secondary Schools which was unveiled by Sir Godfrey Nnamdi Ohuabunwa and The Kiib School are situated in Rumuobiokani community.
