= Anglican Diocese of Niger Delta =

Anglican diocese in Nigeria

The Anglican Diocese of Niger Delta is one of 18 within the Anglican Province of Niger Delta, itself one of 14 ecclesiastical provinces within the Church of Nigeria. The current bishop is Emmanuel Okwuchi Oko-Jaja.

The diocese was established on 1 January 1952 under the pioneer Bishop Ebenezer Dimieari. Dimieari retired in 1961 and was succeeded as Bishop by Rogers Bara Hart, who retired in 1970. His replacement was Bishop Y A Fubara, who handed over to Samuel Onyuku Elenwo in 1981. Elenwo became Bishop of the newly created Diocese of Niger Delta North in 1996 and was succeeded by Gabriel Herbert Pepple, followed by Ralph Ebirien in 2010, followed by Emmanuel Okwuchi Oko-Jaja in 2022.
