= Innocent Ordu =

Anglican bishop in Nigeria

The Rt. Reverend Innocent Ordu
- Bishop of Diocese of Evo
- Church: Church of Nigeria
- Province: Niger Delta
- Diocese: Diocese of Evo
- Elected: 22 May 2009

Orders
- Ordination: 16 May 1995
- Consecration: 12 July 2009 by Peter Akinola

Personal details
- Born: Innocent Uchechukwu Ordu; 3 August 1961 (age 64) Rumuobiokani, Obio-Akpor, Rivers State

Innocent Uchechukwu Ordu (born 3 August 1961 Rumuobiokani, Rivers State) is a Nigerian Anglican bishop.

== Early life and education ==
From 1980 to 1981 he was enrolled at the Rivers State School of Basic Studies, Port Harcourt. He was awaiting admission to university but graduated in 1982 as a journalist and mass communication student from the Distant Learning Program of the London School of Journalism.

He was accepted to study history at University of Port Harcourt the same year and later switched to a course in foreign languages and literature. He attended the University of Grenoble in France for the third year of the program in 1984 receiving a diploma in French Language Studies. He graduated with a Bachelor of Arts (Hons.) in Foreign Languages and Literature.

== Ministerial experience ==
He was ordained as a deacon on 16 May 1995 and as a priest on 11 August 1996. On 23 October 1999, he was installed as a Canon of St. Paul's Cathedral, Diobu, Port Harcourt. He was appointed as an Archdeacon of the Anglican Church on 27 July 2002. He held a number of positions on the parish and diocesan levels between 1996 and 2009, serving in St. Andrew's Rumuobiokani, St. Barnabas, Igwuruta, St. Peter's, Isiokpo, Ikwerre Archdeaconry, St. Mark's Elelenwo Deanery and St. Peter's, Rumuepirikom Deans, Port Harcourt, as vicar, archdeacon and rector.

He served as director of studies for the clergy continuing education, and in several committees of the Diocese of Niger Delta North, as well as a chaplain, ministry of the Diocesan Adult Sunday School, and chairman of the Diocesan Clergy.

As a priest, he was sent to external missions and evangelistic activities on a number of occasions. It brought him to countries such as Ghana and Cameroon.

== Episcopal ministry ==
On 22 May 2009, in the Anglican Communion of the Bishops Synod of the Church of Nigeria at Crowther Chapel in Lokoya, Kogi State, he was elected Pioneer Bishop of the newly established Diocese of Evo in the Diocese of Niger Delta North. On Sunday 12 July 2009, he was formally consecrated to All Saints Cathedral Church (Rumuokwurusi).

== Personal life ==
He is married to Chinyere Uchenna Ordu with one daughter.
