= Rumuokwuta =

Town in Nigeria

- Location in Nigeria
- Coordinates: 4°50′22″N 6°59′17″E
- Country: Nigeria
- State: Rivers State
- Local Government Area: Obio-Akpor
- Time zone: UTC+1 (WAT)
- Postal code: 500272

Rumuokwuta is a town in Obio-Akpor Local Government Area of Rivers State, Nigeria.

The town is home to the newly constructed Cardiovascular and Cancer Screening Centre named after the former Rivers state governor, Dr. Peter Odili. According to the Rivers State government, the cancer center is worth over 26 billion naira.

The town also houses one of the newly constructed flyovers in Rivers State. The flyover connects Rumuokwuta to Rumuola, Rumuepirikom, Rumuigbo, and Mgbuoba axis of Port Harcourt. The flyover was built by Julius Berger Nigeria PLC during Governor Nyesom Wike tenure as Rivers State Governor and commissioned by Bola, Ahmed Tinubu after his election as Nigeria's president-elect.
