= Renaissance Residential Area, Port Harcourt =

Renaissance Residential Area (Previously Shell Residential Area) Rumukoroshe Camp
- Neighbourhood
- Nickname: RA Camp
- Interactive map of Renaissance Residential Area (Previously Shell Residential Area)
- Coordinates: 4°51′6″N 7°2′50″E
- Country: Nigeria
- State: Rivers State
- LGA: Obio-Akpor
- Neighbourhood of: Port Harcourt
- Time zone: UTC+1 (WAT)
- ZIP code: 500211

Renaissance Residential Area, also commonly called Renaissance RA or just RA, is a well-planned and affluent neighbourhood in the heart of Port Harcourt city in Rivers State. It is predominantly residential, and is mainly occupied by Renaissance local and expatriate staff and dependants. It was formerly owned by the Shell Petroleum Development Company of Nigeria (SPDC) under the name Shell RA until the 2025 sale of SPDC to Renaissance.

== Geography ==
Renaissance Residential Area is located at 4°51′6″N 7°2′50″E (4.851779, 7.047472) and its postal area zip code is 500211. Its boundaries are East West Road to the north, Rumuokwurushi Road to the east, Port Harcourt-Aba Expressway to the south, and Eliozu/Okporo Road to the west. The road distance between Port Harcourt's Elelenwo neighbourhood and Renaissance RA is approximately 3.5 kilometres (2.0 miles).

== Education ==
- Rumukoroshe School - Since 1968 Rumukoroshe School has been offering a high-quality international education for the children (aged 3–14), and is now currently educating children of Renaissance staff. The school, now operated by the Renaissance Africa Energy Company is equipped with teaching staff who have a wealth of international experience with degrees and teaching qualifications from some of the most prestigious universities around the world. The school has attained International Primary Curriculum (IPC) accreditation at Mastering level. The school uses the National Curriculum of England for Maths and English and a progression of the IEYC, IPC and IMYC for all other subjects. It also prepares children for their IGCSE's in the Middle Year classes. The reputation and high regard of the school illustrates the investment that the Renaissance Africa Energy Company provides in the future of their employees' children.

== Points of interest ==
- Rumuokwurusi Golf Club - Formed in 1965. The golf club, as of 2010, had just over 100 members. Its 9-hole course layout holds a Standard Scratch Score of 64 (men) and 66 (women).
- The Renaissance Staff Club - Previously known as Shell Club. It first operated under a thatched roof joint from mid 1957 — early 1958. By mid 1960, the club had moved into a new space which would become its permanent building, and initially took on the name "Shell Senior Staff Club". As of today, Renaissance Staff Club is known to offer facilities for fitness, such as gym, swimming pools, and courts for racket sports. There are also a number of bars and restaurants serving at the complex.
