= Choba =

Choba may refer to:

- Choba, Port Harcourt, neighbourhood in Nigeria
- Choba, Kenya, neighbourhood in Kenya
- Choba, a village near Brezovo in Bulgaria
- CHOBA B CCCP - 1988 album by Paul McCartney
