= Samuel Onyuku Elenwo =

Anglican bishop in Nigeria

Samuel Onyuku Elenwo (7 December 1933 – 2008) was the Anglican Bishop of Niger Delta in Niger Delta Province of the Church of Nigeria.

Elenwo was born on 7 December 1933 in Okporowo-Ogbakiri, where he went to primary school, followed by Okporowo-Ogbakiri Central School, Kalabari National College, and thence to New Bethel College, Onitsha.

He was consecrated as the fourth Bishop of Niger Delta on 1 March 1981 by Timothy Olufosoye, the first archbishop of the province, at the Cathedral Church of St. James Oke-Bola, Ibadan. He became the first bishop of the newly created Anglican Diocese of Niger Delta North on 16 May 1996, a tenure he held until his retirement in December 1999.

He died in 2008.
