= List of chairmen and caretaker committee chairmen of Obio-Akpor =

This is a list of chairmen and caretaker committee chairs of Obio-Akpor, a local government area of Rivers State, Nigeria.

To date, only 7 individuals have served as chairman of the local government council. 11 as caretaker committee chairs and 3 as administrators.

#	Name	Position	Took office	Left office	Comments
1	B.A. Worgu	Chairman	May 1989	July 1989	Engineer
2	S.O. Worgu	Sole Administrator	July 1989	January 1990	
3	M.O. Nnadi	CTC Chairman	January 1990	December 1990	
4	Ndumati E.Lawson Ndu	Chairman	January 1991	June 1991	Chief
5	O.T. Weli	Chairman	July 1991	June 1993	Engineer
6	Dekor Allison A.	Administrator	July 1993	March 1994	
7	K.K. Owhonda	CTC Chairman	April 1994	April 1995	Engineer
8	L.W. Chukwu	Chairman	April 1995	April 1996	JP
9	Freddy N.W. Ichegbo	Chairman	April 1996	April 1997	Hon.
10	John Naale	Administrator	1997	1999	
11	Ezenwo Nyesom Wike	Chairman	1999	2002	Chief Barr.
12	G.N. Amadi	CTC Chairman	May 2002	February 2003	Engineer, JP
13	Timothy E. Nsirim	CTC Chairman	February 2003	August 2003	Hon., JP
14	Dennis Emenike	CTC Chairman	August 2003	April 2004	
15	Ezenwo Nyesom Wike	Chairman	April 2004	June 2007	Chief Barr.
16	Dike Harcourt White	CTC Chairman	June 2007	November 2007	
17	Tony Okocha	CTC Chairman	November 2007	April 2008	Hon.
18	Timothy E. Nsirim	Chairman	April 2008	April 2011	
19	Kate Chukwu	CTC Chairman	April 2011	May 2011	Barr.
20	Timothy E. Nsirim	Chairman	May 2011	November 2013	Hon.
21	Lawrence Chukwu	CTC Chairman	November 2013	May 2015	Dr.
22	Bright Amaewhule	CTC Chairman	July 2015	May 2016	
23	Collins Onunwo	CTC Chairman	May 2016	incumbent	
24	Chief Prince Noble Amadi	CTC Chairman	February 2018	June 2018	
25	Solomon Abel Eke				
26	Barr. George Ariolu	CHAIRMAN	July 2021	Present	Barr.
