= List of Indigenous peoples of Rivers State =

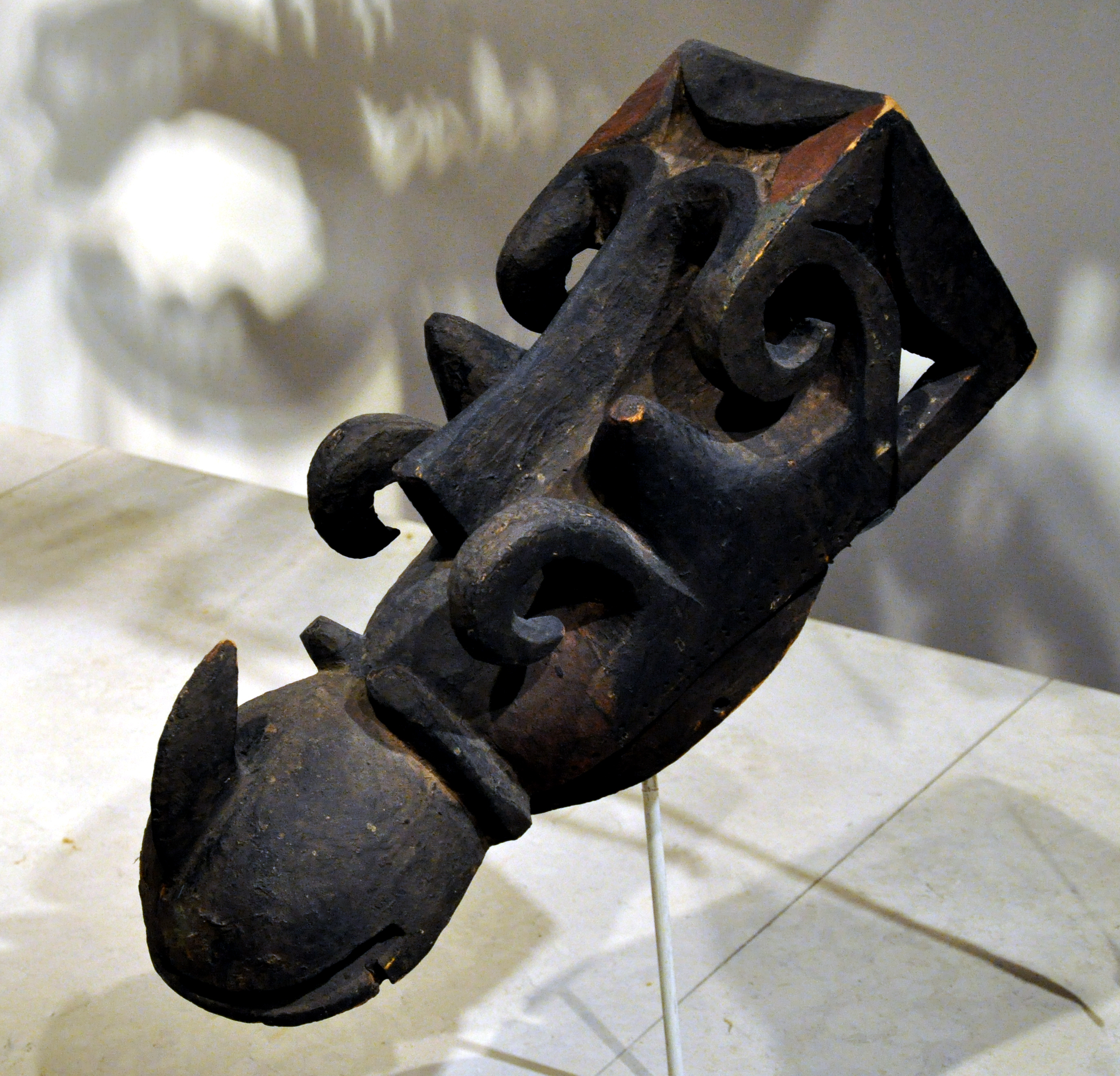
Mask (hippopotamus masquerade), Abua people, 19th century

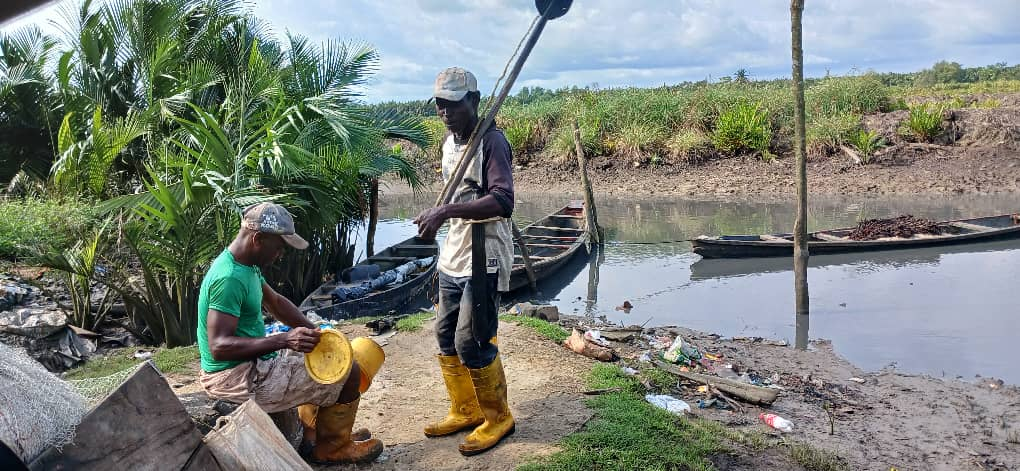

Rivers State is the sixth-largest geographic area in Nigeria according to 2006 census data. The state has an indigenously diverse population with major riverine and upland divisions. The dominant tribes are: Ikwerre, Ogoni, and Ijaw, representing three dominant Ethno-Linguistic blocs in the State, in no particular order ( Ijoid and Ogoni). Upla The riverine, including most of the state's towns and villages surrounded by water, is moderately inhabited. It covers approximately 39% of the total land mass and is home to the Ijaw people.

This list refers to the various autochthonous ethnic groups residing within Rivers State's boundaries in addition to its upland and riverine areas.
