= Port Harcourt Zoo =

- Interactive map of Port Harcourt Zoo
- 4°48′40″N 7°2′48″E
- Date opened: 1 October 1975
- Location: Trans Amadi, Rivers State, Nigeria
- Major exhibits: 67
- Owner: State owned

Port Harcourt Zoo (also known as PH Zoo) is a state owned zoological park in Port Harcourt city of Rivers State in Nigeria. The zoo was established in 1974 by military governor Alfred Diete-Spiff and was officially opened to the public on 1 October 1975.

Located within the Trans Amadi industrial layout in Rivers State, Port Harcourt Zoo has been ranked among the major tourist attractions in the city and is considered one of Nigeria's leading conservation centres. The Port Harcourt International Airport is approximately 14 miles (22.5 km) northwest of the park.

By 18 June 2012, the Rivers State government had announced plans to introduce new animals to the zoo and completely revamp its state to match global standards. The zoo is home to numerous exception creature species, for example, lion, cobra, monkeys, chimpanzees, turtles, crocodile and numerous winged animals species. The ends of the week are the time when the zoo is most disparaged, and all things considered. On Sunday visits you get the chance to witness the nourishing of the creatures, particularly the lions. Inside the zoo, there is an historical center where a lion and a lioness were preserved. These two animals were executed by electric shock when they assaulted and ate the zoo specialist who came to encourage them and neglected to bolt the pen.

== See also ==
- List of zoos
