= Obio =

Group of the Ikwerre ethnic nationality

Obio is one of the seven groups of the ancient Ikwerre ethnic nationality. The Community constitute part of Obio/Akpor Local Government Area and entire Port Harcourt Local Government Area both in Rivers State of Nigeria.

== Geography ==
Obio is bounded in the North by Akpor Kingdom, in the West by Degema, to the East by Eleme, to the South by Okrika, bounded to the Northwest by Bori, to the South East by Ahoada and to the South West by Ikwerre Local Government Area. Principal towns and urban communities of Obio Community include-New GRA, Old GRA, Rebisi, Rumuodumaya, Rumuigbo, Rumuokwuta etc.

== Ancient history ==
How and when the Obio came to live in this area is unknown. The legends and speculations are the Obio had lived by the Waja River near the Nwakpu shrine, which served as the common deity of the clan. Some elders hold that the Obio used to live where the Ahia Makara currently is. It Was alleged that Obio was a hunter who wandered in those area for hunting business. He was married to a wife named Okutarangi and had two sons; Evo and Apara. Ancient narrative of the community holds that Evo was the first son of Obio and was a farmer while Apara, the second son was a hunter the two sons had a wife each, while Evo had three Children, Apara had just one. Being an only child, elders claim that the son of Apara quickly married three wives who had nine children for him with Ekinigbo being the first and Rebisi being the last child. The elders claim that as Evo was a tiller of ground, he remained at home while Apara moved from place to place in search of greener pastures. When their mother died, Evo being at home sent words to his brother to return home to make his contribution towards her burial. Apara did not return for his mother's burial, the whole burial activities were carried out by Evo who after decided to seize all the inheritance of the family leaving none for Apara. Some of the inheritance that Evo seized from Apara includes a number of slaves that their father bought for Apara. The slaves later left Evo and returned to Apara. The dispute arising from the management of their father's inheritance separated both brothers and created enmity among their descendants. When both brothers were separated, Evo settled at Woji while Apara settled at the area today between Rumuola and Rumuigbo where Rumuapara today have a meeting place [Ehie Apara]. From these ancestors, their sons left to form families, extended families and compounds of Obio group. Despite their differences, they acknowledged a common ancestor. Before the advent of British rule in the area, there were continuous rivalry between Rumuevo and Rumuapara. The presence of the number of Aros in the Area is accounted to have risen from the dispute that ensued between both brotherly communities. For instance, it accounted that for sake of curtailing the rivalry, the Nye-Nwe Eli of Woji went to Arochukwu to invite Aros to come and help him settle the dispute with Rumuapara. Rumuapara followed suit, went to Arochukwu and asked the Aros to come and help him resolve the conflict with the Rumuevo. These actions brought about many Aros that settled in the community. Prior to the British rule, the Aros played a vital role in the existence of the people of Obio by helping to settle disputes as well as acquiring important positions in the administration of both brotherly clans.

== British Rule in Obio Group ==
Until 1929, the Obio area was under Degema Division. The first town visited by the British troops was Woji. That marked the beginning of British rule in the area. A native minor court was established at Rumuokwurusi in 1902. The bench was selected by either compounds or the District Officer. The Rumuokwurusi native court had judicial authority over all entire area identified as Obio group of Ikwerre land. The territory is bounded on the West and North West by Native Court area, bounded on the North by Etche clan of Okonmoko area, bounded on the East by Mbolli Native Court area and on the South by Okrika Native Court area and Port Harcourt Township. The Rumuokwurusi Court was upgraded to "C Grade" in 1923. In 1929, there was purposed for demolishing of the court. The move was frustrated by the District Officer and a band of troops. The court was assessed as unsuccessful and been hated by the people. There were cases of corrupt practices by members as some of them were imprisoned. The court was suspended in 1930. Another grade "D" court was established at Woji of the same Obio group in 1930. The Rumuokwurusi Native Court had a court clerk and six court messengers that were permanent staff. All the officers drew large salary for their duties. None of them was a native of the community of the Obio group. The court clerk issued all the warrants, summonses and took down a complete record of the proceeding in English.
