= Ralph Ebirien =

Anglican bishop in Nigeria

Ralph Ebirien is an Anglican bishop in Nigeria: he is the current Bishop of Niger Delta one of nine in the Anglican Province of the Niger Delta, itself one of 14 within the Church of Nigeria.

He was elected as Bishop of Niger Delta on 29 October 2009 at the Episcopal synod of the Church of Nigeria Anglican Communion held at the Basilica of Grace Apo in Gudu district of the Anglican Diocese of Abuja.
