= Rumuodomaya =

Community in Rivers State, Nigeria

Rumuodomaya is a town in Obio-Akpor, Rivers State, Nigeria.

== Details ==
Rumuodomaya is situated nearby to the village of Rukpokwu-Obio and the Rumodome locality. It also sits between the towns of Rumuokoro and Rukpokwu communities. The town houses the popular daily slaughter market in Rumuodomaya/Rumuokoro axis. It is the seat of a second-order administrative division in Obio-Akpor local government area.
