= Trans Amadi International School =

Preschool in Nigeria

Trans Amadi International School (TAIS), formerly Michelin School, is a private non-denominational preschool and elementary school in Port Harcourt, Rivers State. It was established in 1980 for the children of the employees of the then Michelin Factory in Trans Amadi, but later became the Trans Amadi International School in 1988.

Presently, the school continues to cater for children of all nationalities aged between 2 and 11. The school is located at 32 St. Andrew's Street, Rumuobiakani, Trans Amadi in Obio-Akpor local government area.

== See also ==
- List of schools in Port Harcourt
