= Wisdom Budu Ihunwo =

Anglican bishop in Nigeria

Wisdom Budu Ihunwo (born 27 December 1976) is the Bishop of Niger Delta North in the Anglican Province of Niger Delta in the Church of Nigeria.

He was consecrated as Bishop of Niger Delta North on 3 June 2018.

Ihunwo is a graduate of the University of Nigeria Nsukka and has a master's degree from the University of Port Harcourt.

He was Vicar of Saint Paul's Cathedral in the Anglican Diocese of Port Harcourt.
