= Choba River =

River in Nigeria

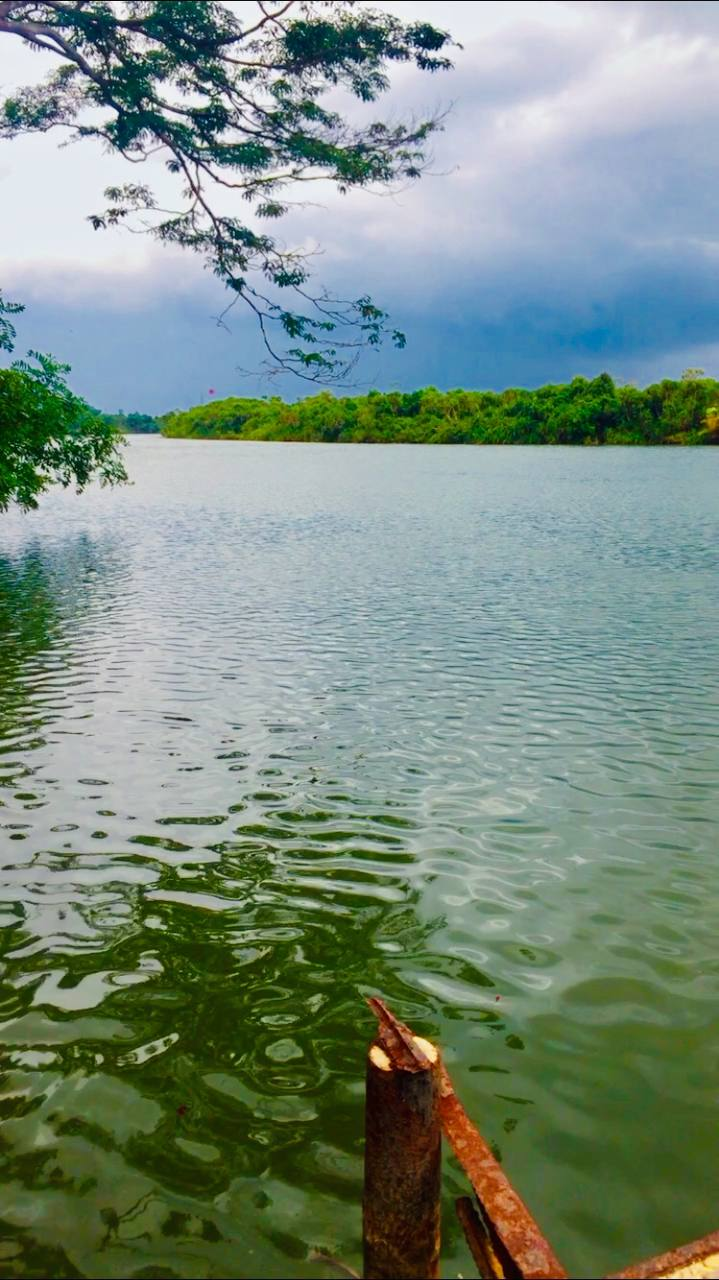
Choba River

Choba River is a river in Rivers State, Nigeria. It is located in Choba Neighbourhood under the Obio-Akpor Local Government Area of Rivers State Nigeria. The Choba River is an extension of the New Calabar River and is located close to the famous Choba market.

== Pollution ==
A study published in the Biodiversity International Journal of 2017 by Nwankwoala and Angaya of the Department of Geology at the University of Port Harcourt revealed that there were heavy metal concentrations of Cadmium, Lead, Chromium, and Manganese in the water.

The river has also recorded pollutions as a result of drowned bodies and decomposed bodies of dead people.

== See also ==
- University of Port Harcourt
- Choba, Port Harcourt
