= Simeon Chituru Achinewhu =

Nigerian academic

Professor Simeon Chituru Achinewhu Vice-chancellor of Rivers State University 2000-2007
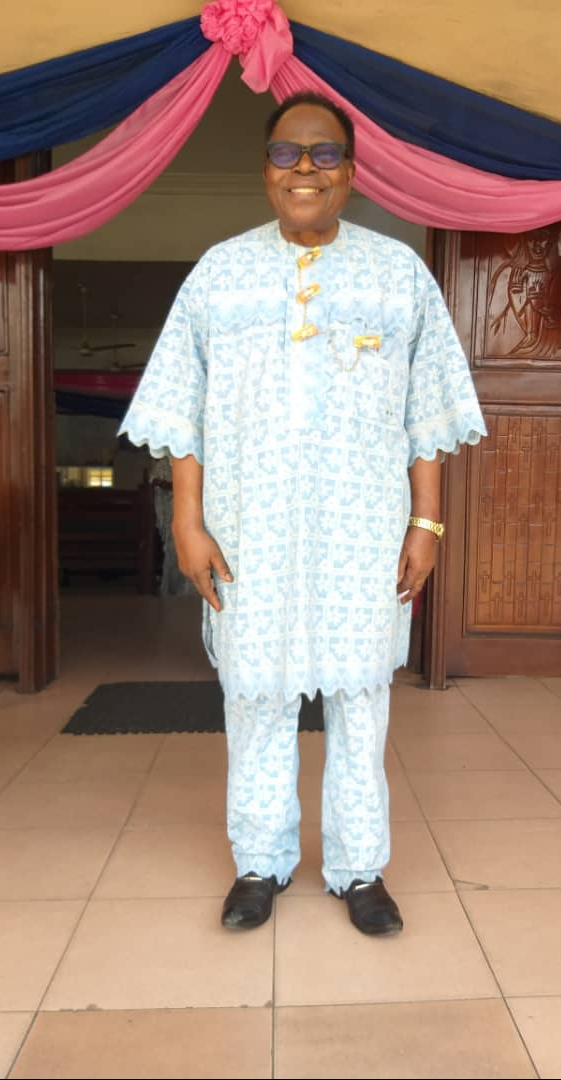
- Born: 15 August 1946 (age 80)
- Education: University of Reading, UK
- Known for: Food and nutrition biochemistry

Simeon Chituru Achinewhu (born 15 August, 1946) is a Nigerian food and nutrition biochemist, scholar and university administrator who served as the past president-general of Ogbakor Ikwerre Socio-cultural Organisation Worldwide. He was vice–chancellor of River State University (formerly Rivers State University of Science and Technology), from October 2000 until May 2007. In 2005 he was named the most research active vice-chancellor in the Nigerian university system.

== Background and education ==
Born on 15 August 1946 in Ikwerre Local Government Area, Rivers State, Nigeria, Achinewhu had his primary education in his home town Aluu. He finished from County Grammar School, Ikwerre/Etche in 1963 with Grade One. He later proceeded to Government Secondary School, Owerri and got his Higher School Certificate in physics, chemistry, and zoology in 1965. In 1970, Achinewhu graduated from the University of Ibadan, B.Sc. second class honors, M.Sc. in 1972 and Ph.D. 1975 in food science and technology from University of Reading, UK.

== Career ==
Starting as lecturer at Rivers State University in food chemistry/biochemistry, food process technology, safety and fermentation, toxicology and nutrition in 1975, he has remained there to-date. He is also a researcher in Rivers State University, Port Harcourt (formerly Rivers State University of Science and Technology) and research is mostly centered on the composition and quality evaluation of Nigerian local foodstuff.

As of 2021, Achinewhu serves as professor emeritus at the Rivers State University.

Prior to being appointed vice-chancellor of Rivers State University 2000, Achinewhu held the following positions:

- Dean, Post Graduate School (1998-2000)
- Head of the Department of Food Science & Technology (November 1995 – June 1998)
- Dean, Faculty of Agriculture (1989-1994)
- Director, Rivers Institute of Agricultural Research & Training (RIART), Rivers State University (1986-1989)

== Awards and visits ==
In course of his research and scholastic endeavors, Achinewhu has visited many universities and has received a number of international as well as local awards.

=== International academic awards ===
- Post-doctorate fellowship senior scholar Fulbright Fellowship (1985), where he was a visiting Fulbright fellow.
- Post-doctorate fellow Association of Commonwealth Universities (1984-1985), where he was a visiting Commonwealth fellow

=== International academic visits ===
- Post doctorate visit on a senior scholar Fulbright fellowship University of Massachusetts (September – December 1985)
- Post doctorate visit on Association of Commonwealth Universities Fellowship University of Leeds, UK (October 1984 – July 1985)
- Visiting post-doctorate fellow at the University of Reading, UK (1980)

In 2010 he was selected and worked as an expert in Europe-Africa Quality Connect: A collaborative project in five African universities between European Universities Association (EUA) and the Association of African Universities (AAU), sponsored by European Commission.

== Academic contributions ==
Achinewhu has analyzed more than fifty homegrown foodstuffs, which include seeds, nuts, tubers, spices, and herbs. These indigenous food items where examined and explored for their nutrient compositions and quality of protein content. Details of his findings are being used along with others in the compendium of Nigeria's food composition table.

He evolved the processing and production of coffee from coffee seed grown in Bayelsa State, Nigeria.

He did research on cassava processing, which identified upgrade cassava cultivars with superior quality food values with regards to product output and other physico-chemical properties. He identified new cultivars with high starch yield and therefore high export potentials.

He developed a baby food (weaning) supplement employing the use of a combination of fermented plant food products. This was used to nourish children who were undernourished, in the days of Better Life Programme for Rural Women.

== Personal life ==
Achinewhu married Eunice Achinewhu (nee Eunice Nyema Otto) in 1972 and they have four children.

He is a reverend canon of the Church of Nigeria Anglican Communion. He is a crown of peace, justice of peace, and the national president of Peace Builders Association (Council of Ambassadors for Peace and Unification)
