= Alakahia =

Settlement in Obio-Akpor, Rivers State, Nigeria

Coordinates: 4°53′07″N 6°55′27″E

Alakahia (audio) is a community located in Obio-Akpor in Rivers State, Nigeria. The paramount ruler of Alakahia is Eze Daniel Ogbonda-Dodoo. Alakahia community is located nearby two villages, namely: Rumualogu and Ozuoba.

== Communities ==
1. Rumuosi
2. Ozuoba
3. Rumuolumeni
4. Choba
5. Rumualogu
6. Rumuodumaya

== Location ==
It is located in the heart of Obio-Akpor LGA, Rivers State, Nigeria.

== Features ==
Alakahia is close to the University of Port Harcourt and its Teaching Hospital.
