= Abuloma, Rivers State =

District in Port-Harcourt, Nigeria

Coordinates: 4.7776338°N 7.0365797°E

Abuloma is a district in the Port Harcourt local government area of Rivers State of Nigeria and became a district in 1956, which later became the headquarters of other districts from 1983 to 1986. The king of ancient Abuloma in Port Harcourt is Bright Ateke Fiboinumama, Obeomomu-Odu, and he is a second-class king. The people of Abuloma speak the language called Obulom.
