= Rumuigbo =

Rumuigbo is a town in Obio-Apor, Rivers State, Nigeria. Rumuigbo is located near two villages, namely: Rumu-Chita and Mgbuoba. It houses the Neuro Psychiatric Hospital. This hospital provides mental health services for Rivers State and surrounding States in the Niger Delta region of Nigeria.
