= Plosive =

Consonant in which the vocal tract is blocked so that all airflow ceases

In phonetics, a plosive, also known as an occlusive or simply a stop, is a consonant in which airflow is blocked entirely at some point in the vocal tract, forming a complete stricture. Plosives may be pulmonic or glottalic egressive.

The occlusion may be made with the tongue tip or blade (such as [t, d]), tongue body (such as [k, ɡ]), lips (such as [p, b]), or glottis (such as [ʔ]). Plosives contrast with other speech sounds including nasals, where the vocal tract is blocked but airflow continues through the nose, and with fricatives, where partial occlusion impedes but does not block airflow in the vocal tract.

== Terminology ==
The terms stop, occlusive, and plosive are often used interchangeably. Linguists who distinguish them may not agree on the distinction being made. "Stop" refers to the stopping of the airflow, "occlusive" to the articulation which occludes (blocks) the vocal tract, and "plosive" to the plosion (release burst) of the consonant. Some object to the use of "plosive" for inaudibly released stops, which may then instead be called "applosives". The International Phonetic Association and the International Clinical Phonetics and Linguistics Association use the term "plosive".

Either "occlusive" or "stop" may be used as a general term covering the other together with nasals. That is, 'occlusive' may be defined as oral occlusive (plosives and affricates) plus nasal occlusives (nasals such as [m, n]), or 'stop' may be defined as oral stops (plosives) plus nasal stops (nasals). Ladefoged and Maddieson (1996) prefer to restrict 'stop' to oral non-affricated occlusives. They say,

what we call simply nasals are called nasal stops by some linguists. We avoid this phrase, preferring to reserve the term 'stop' for sounds in which there is a complete interruption of airflow.

In addition, they restrict "plosive" for pulmonic consonants; "stops" in their usage include ejective and implosive consonants.

If a term such as "plosive" is used for oral non-affricated obstruents, and nasals are not called nasal stops, then a stop may mean the glottal stop; "plosive" may even mean non-glottal stop. In other cases, however, it may be the word "plosive" that is restricted to the glottal stop. Generally speaking, plosives do not have plosion (a release burst). In English, for example, there are plosives with no audible release, such as the /p/ in apt. However, English plosives do have plosion in other environments.

In Ancient Greek, the term for plosive was ἄφωνον (áphōnon), which means "unpronounceable", "voiceless", or "silent", because plosives could not be pronounced without a vowel. This term was calqued into Latin as mūta, and from there borrowed into English as mute. Mute was sometimes used instead for voiceless consonants, whether plosives or fricatives, a usage that was later replaced with surd, from Latin surdus "deaf" or "silent", a term still occasionally seen in the literature. For more information on the Ancient Greek terms, see Ancient Greek phonology § Terminology.

== Articulation ==
A plosive is typically analysed as having up to three phases:

- Approach, during which articulators come together
- Hold (or "occlusion" or "closure"), during which the articulators are held and block the airstream
- Release (or "burst" or "plosion"), when the articulators are separated, releasing the compressed air

Only the hold phase is requisite. A plosive may lack an approach when it is preceded by a consonant that involves an occlusion at the same place of articulation, as in [d] in end or old. In many languages, such as Malay and Vietnamese, word-final plosives lack a release burst, even when followed by a vowel, or have a nasal release. See no audible release.

== Common plosives ==
All spoken natural languages in the world have plosives, and most have at least the voiceless plosives [p], [t], and [k]. However, there are exceptions: Colloquial Samoan lacks the coronal [t], and several North American languages, such as the Iroquoian languages (e.g., Mohawk and Cherokee), and Arabic lack the labial [p]. In fact, the labial is the least stable of the voiceless plosives in the languages of the world, as the unconditioned sound change [p] → [f] (→ [h] → Ø) is quite common in unrelated languages, having occurred in the history of Classical Japanese, Classical Arabic, and Proto-Celtic, for instance. Formal Samoan has only one word with velar [k]; colloquial Samoan conflates /t/ and /k/ to /k/. Niʻihau Hawaiian has [t] for /k/ to a greater extent than Standard Hawaiian, but neither distinguish a /k/ from a /t/. It may be more accurate to say that Hawaiian and colloquial Samoan do not distinguish velar and coronal plosives than to say they lack one or the other.

Ontena Gadsup has only 1 phonemic plosive /ʔ/. Yanyuwa distinguishes plosives in 7 places of articulations /b d̪ d ḏ ɖ ɡ̟ ɡ̠/ (it does not have voiceless plosives) which is the most out of all languages.

See Common occlusives for the distribution of both plosives and nasals.

== Classification ==
=== Voice ===
Voiced plosives are pronounced with vibration of the vocal cords, voiceless plosives without. Plosives are commonly voiceless, and many languages, such as Mandarin Chinese and Hawaiian, have only voiceless plosives. Others, such as most Australian languages, are indeterminate: plosives may vary between voiced and voiceless without distinction, some of them like Yanyuwa and Yidiny have only voiced plosives.

=== Aspiration ===
In aspirated plosives, the vocal cords (vocal folds) are abducted at the time of release. In a prevocalic aspirated plosive (a plosive followed by a vowel or sonorant), the time when the vocal cords begin to vibrate will be delayed until the vocal folds come together enough for voicing to begin, and will usually start with breathy voicing. The duration between the release of the plosive and the voice onset is called the voice onset time (VOT) or the aspiration interval. Highly aspirated plosives have a long period of aspiration, so that there is a long period of voiceless airflow (a phonetic [h]) before the onset of the vowel. In tenuis plosives, the vocal cords come together for voicing immediately following the release, and there is little or no aspiration (a voice onset time close to zero). In English, there may be a brief segment of breathy voice that identifies the plosive as voiceless and not voiced. In voiced plosives, the vocal folds are set for voice before the release, and often vibrate during the entire hold, and in English, the voicing after release is not breathy. A plosive is called "fully voiced" if it is voiced during the entire occlusion. In English, however, initial voiced plosives like /#b/ or /#d/ may have no voicing during the period of occlusion, or the voicing may start shortly before the release and continue after release, and word-final plosives tend to be fully devoiced: In most dialects of English, the final /b/, /d/ and /g/ in words like rib, mad and dog are fully devoiced. Initial voiceless plosives, like the p in pie, are aspirated, with a palpable puff of air upon release, whereas a plosive after an s, as in spy, is tenuis (unaspirated). When spoken near a candle flame, the flame will flicker more after the words par, tar, and car are articulated, compared with spar, star, and scar. In the common pronunciation of papa, the initial p is aspirated whereas the medial p is not.

=== Length ===
In a geminate or long consonant, the occlusion lasts longer than in simple consonants. In languages where plosives are only distinguished by length (e.g., Arabic, Ilwana, Icelandic), the long plosives may be held up to three times as long as the short plosives. Italian is well known for its geminate plosives, as the double t in the name Vittoria takes just as long to say as the ct does in English Victoria. Japanese also prominently features geminate consonants, such as in the minimal pair 来た kita 'came' and 切った kitta 'cut'. Estonian is unusual for contrasting three lengths, as in the minimal triplet kabi /kɑpi/ 'hoof', kapi /kɑpːi/ 'wardrobe [gen. sg.]', and kappi /kɑpːːi/ 'wardrobe [ill. sg.]'.

There are many languages where the features voice, aspiration, and length reinforce each other, and in such cases it may be hard to determine which of these features predominates. In such cases, the terms fortis is sometimes used for aspiration or gemination, whereas lenis is used for single, tenuous, or voiced plosives. However, the terms fortis and lenis are poorly defined, and their meanings vary from source to source.

=== Nasalization ===
Simple nasals are differentiated from plosives only by a lowered velum that allows the air to escape through the nose during the occlusion. Nasals are acoustically sonorants, as they have a non-turbulent airflow and are nearly always voiced, but they are articulatorily obstruents, as there is complete blockage of the oral cavity. The term occlusive may be used as a cover term for both nasals and plosives.

A prenasalized stop starts out with a lowered velum that raises during the occlusion. The closest examples in English are consonant clusters such as the [nd] in candy, but many languages have prenasalized stops that function phonologically as single consonants. Swahili is well known for having words beginning with prenasalized stops, as in ndege 'bird', and in many languages of the South Pacific, such as Fijian, these are even spelled with single letters: b [mb], d [nd].

A postnasalized plosive begins with a raised velum that lowers during the occlusion. This causes an audible nasal release, as in English sudden. This could also be compared to the /dn/ cluster found in Russian and other Slavic languages, which can be seen in the name of the Dnieper River.

The terms prenasalization and postnasalization are normally used only in languages where these sounds are phonemic: that is, not analyzed into sequences of plosive plus nasal.

=== Airstream mechanism ===
Stops may be made with more than one airstream mechanism. The normal mechanism is pulmonic egressive, that is, with air flowing outward from the lungs. All spoken languages have pulmonic stops. Some languages have stops made with other mechanisms as well: ejective stops (glottalic egressive), implosive stops (glottalic ingressive), or click consonants (lingual ingressive).

=== Tenseness ===
A fortis plosive is produced with more muscular tension than a lenis plosive. However, this is difficult to measure, and there is usually debate over the actual mechanism of alleged fortis or lenis consonants.

There are a series of plosives in the Korean language, sometimes written with the IPA symbol for ejectives, which are produced using "stiff voice", meaning there is increased contraction of the glottis than for normal production of voiceless plosives. The indirect evidence for stiff voice is in the following vowels, which have a higher fundamental frequency than those following other plosives. The higher frequency is explained as a result of the glottis being tense. Other such phonation types include breathy voice, or murmur; slack voice; and creaky voice.

== Transcription ==
The following plosives have been given dedicated symbols in the IPA.

Symbols for plosive consonants
⟨p⟩	voiceless bilabial plosive	⟨b⟩	voiced bilabial plosive
⟨t⟩	voiceless alveolar plosive	⟨d⟩	voiced alveolar plosive
⟨ʈ⟩	voiceless retroflex plosive	⟨ɖ⟩	voiced retroflex plosive
⟨c⟩	voiceless palatal plosive	⟨ɟ⟩	voiced palatal plosive
⟨k⟩	voiceless velar plosive	⟨ɡ⟩	voiced velar plosive
⟨q⟩	voiceless uvular plosive	⟨ɢ⟩	voiced uvular plosive
⟨ʡ⟩	epiglottal plosive		
⟨ʔ⟩	glottal stop		

=== English ===
[p t k]	voiceless, aspirated word-initially, tenuis in clusters after s, word-final often with no audible release
[b d ɡ]	unaspirated, partially voiced word-initially, fully voiced intervocalically, fully devoiced when word-final
[ʔ]	glottal stop, not as a phoneme in most dialects

=== Variations ===
Many subclassifications of plosives are transcribed by adding a diacritic or modifier letter to the IPA symbols above.

Phonation and voice-onset time
⟨t⟩	voiceless	⟨d⟩	voiced
⟨t˭⟩	tenuis	⟨tʰ⟩	aspirated
		⟨dʱ⟩	breathy-voiced

Airstream mechanism
⟨t⟩		⟨d⟩	pulmonic egressive
⟨tʼ⟩	ejective	⟨ɗ⟩	implosive
⟨!⟩	click		

Nasality
⟨ⁿd⟩	prenasalized	⟨dⁿ⟩	nasally released

⟨d̥⟩	lenis: ⟨d⟩ with voicelessness diacritic	⟨t͈⟩	tense	⟨tt dd⟩ ⟨tː dː⟩	geminate

== See also ==
- Continuant (the opposite of a stop)
- List of phonetics topics
- Pop filter
- Nonexplosive stop

Place →	Labial					Coronal										Dorsal					Laryngeal			
Manner ↓	Bilabial		Labiodental		Linguolabial		Dental		Alveolar		Postalveolar		Retroflex		(Alveolo-)palatal		Velar		Uvular		Pharyngeal/epiglottal		Glottal	
Nasal	m̥	m	ɱ̊	ɱ		n̼	n̪̊	n̪	n̥	n	n̠̊	n̠	ɳ̊	ɳ	ɲ̊	ɲ	ŋ̊	ŋ	ɴ̥	ɴ				
Plosive	p	b	p̪	b̪	t̼	d̼	t̪	d̪	t	d			ʈ	ɖ	c	ɟ	k	ɡ	q	ɢ	ʡ		ʔ	
Sibilant affricate							t̪s̪	d̪z̪	ts	dz	t̠ʃ	d̠ʒ	tʂ	dʐ	tɕ	dʑ								
Non-sibilant affricate	pɸ	bβ	p̪f	b̪v			t̪θ	d̪ð	tɹ̝̊	dɹ̝	t̠ɹ̠̊˔	d̠ɹ̠˔			cç	ɟʝ	kx	ɡɣ	qχ	ɢʁ	ʡʜ	ʡʢ	ʔh	
Sibilant fricative							s̪	z̪	s	z	ʃ	ʒ	ʂ	ʐ	ɕ	ʑ								
Non-sibilant fricative	ɸ	β	f	v	θ̼	ð̼	θ	ð	θ̠	ð̠	ɹ̠̊˔	ɹ̠˔	ɻ̊˔	ɻ˔	ç	ʝ	x	ɣ	χ	ʁ	ħ	ʕ	h	ɦ
Approximant		β̞		ʋ				ð̞		ɹ		ɹ̠		ɻ		j		ɰ						˷
Tap/flap		ⱱ̟		ⱱ					ɾ̥	ɾ			ɽ̊	ɽ						ɢ̆		ʡ̮		
Trill	ʙ̥	ʙ							r̥	r		r̠	ɽ̊r̥	ɽr					ʀ̥	ʀ	ʜ	ʢ		
Lateral affricate									tɬ	dɮ			tꞎ	d𝼅	c𝼆	ɟʎ̝	k𝼄	ɡʟ̝						
Lateral fricative							ɬ̪		ɬ	ɮ			ꞎ	𝼅	𝼆	ʎ̝	𝼄	ʟ̝						
Lateral approximant								l̪	l̥	l		l̠	ɭ̊	ɭ	ʎ̥	ʎ	ʟ̥	ʟ		ʟ̠				
Lateral tap/flap									ɺ̥	ɺ			𝼈̊	𝼈		ʎ̮		ʟ̆						

		BL	LD	D	A	PA	RF	P	V	U
Implosive	Voiced	ɓ			ɗ		ᶑ	ʄ	ɠ	ʛ
Implosive	Voiceless	ɓ̥			ɗ̥		ᶑ̊	ʄ̊	ɠ̊	ʛ̥
Ejective	Stop	pʼ			tʼ		ʈʼ	cʼ	kʼ	qʼ
Ejective	Affricate		p̪fʼ	t̪θʼ	tsʼ	t̠ʃʼ	tʂʼ	tɕʼ	kxʼ	qχʼ
Ejective	Fricative	ɸʼ	fʼ	θʼ	sʼ	ʃʼ	ʂʼ	ɕʼ	xʼ	χʼ
Ejective	Lateral affricate				tɬʼ			c𝼆ʼ	k𝼄ʼ	q𝼄ʼ
Ejective	Lateral fricative				ɬʼ					
Click (top: velar; bottom: uvular)	Tenuis	kʘ qʘ		kǀ qǀ	kǃ qǃ		k𝼊 q𝼊	kǂ qǂ		
Click (top: velar; bottom: uvular)	Voiced	ɡʘ ɢʘ		ɡǀ ɢǀ	ɡǃ ɢǃ		ɡ𝼊 ɢ𝼊	ɡǂ ɢǂ		
Click (top: velar; bottom: uvular)	Nasal	ŋʘ ɴʘ		ŋǀ ɴǀ	ŋǃ ɴǃ		ŋ𝼊 ɴ𝼊	ŋǂ ɴǂ	ʞ	
Click (top: velar; bottom: uvular)	Tenuis lateral				kǁ qǁ					
Click (top: velar; bottom: uvular)	Voiced lateral				ɡǁ ɢǁ					
Click (top: velar; bottom: uvular)	Nasal lateral				ŋǁ ɴǁ					
