= Ada-George Road =

Town in Rivers state

- city
- Location of Ada-George Road in Port Harcourt, Nigeria
- Coordinates: 4.8293765°N 6.9765245°E
- State: Rivers State
- Local Government Area: Obio-Akpor

Government
  - Governor: Ezenwo Nyesom Wike (PDP)
- Time zone: UTC+1 (CET/WAT)

Ada-George Road also known as Ada-George is a town in Rivers State, Port Harcourt, Nigeria. The road was expanded and dualized by former Governor Rotimi Chibuike Amaechi.

== History ==
The name Ada-George Road was originated from the second governor of river state, Rufus Ada George.

== Geography ==
Ada-George Road is consist of two express way left & right linking to Location Bus stop which has an unfinished project flyover constructed by Julius Berger and Agip Bus stop.
