= Mgbuoba =

Town in Rivers State

Mgbuoba is a town in Obio-Akpor, Rivers State, Nigeria.

== Geography ==
Mgbuoba is in the west of Central Port Harcourt, along the Mgbuoba/NTA Road. Its Zip code is 500272.
