= Ikwerre language =

Volta-Niger language spoken in Nigeria

Ikwerre
- Pronunciation: [ìkʷéré]
- Native to: Rivers state, Nigeria
- Ethnicity: Ikwerre people
- Native speakers: (200,000 cited 1976)
- Language family: Niger–Congo?: Atlantic–Congo; Volta–Niger; Igboid; Ikwerre
- Dialects: Apara, Ndele, Ọgbakiri, Ọbịọ, Akpor Alụụ, Ịbaa, Elele
- Writing system: Latin script

Language codes
- ISO 639-3: ikw
- Glottolog: ikwe1242

Ikwerre (Iwhuruohna) is a language spoken primarily by the Ikwerre people, who inhabit certain areas of Rivers State, Nigeria.

== Classification ==
The Ikwerre language is an Igboid language of the Volta-Niger branch of Niger-Congo family of languages. Based on lexicostatistical analysis, Kay Williamson first asserted that the Ikwerre, Ekpeye, and Ogba, languages belonged to the same language cluster, and were not dialects. After subsequent studies and more research by both Williamson and Roger Blench, it was concluded that lexical similar languages like Ikwerre, Ogba, Igbo and Ekpeye form a "language cluster" and that they are somewhat mutually intelligible.

== Dialects ==
Alerechi (2018) states that there are 24 divergent dialects. Those starred (*) below are only provided with their abbreviations:

1. Akpb*
2. Akpọ (Akpo-Mgbu-Tolu)
3. Alụu
4. Apani
5. Ibaa
6. Igwuruta
7. Ipo
8. Isiokpo
9. Egbedna
10. Elele
11. Ẹmowha (Emowhua)
12. Obio
13. Omagwna
14. Omerelu
15. Omudioga
16. Omdm*
17. Ozha*
18. Ọdeegnu
19. Ọgbakiri
20. Ọmuanwa
21. Rmkp*
22. Rndl*
23. Ubima
24. Ubmn*

In addition, Glottolog lists two dialects that are unclear which of Alerechi's listing they correspond to (if any):

1. Ndele
2. Rumuji

== Phonology ==
=== Vowels ===
Ikwerre distinguishes vowels by quality (frontedness and height), the presence or absence of nasalization, and the presence or absence of advanced tongue root.

		Front	Back
High	+ATR	i ĩ	u ũ
High	−ATR	ɪ ɪ̃	ʊ ʊ̃
Mid	+ATR	e ẽ	o õ
Mid	−ATR	ɛ ɛ̃	ɔ ɔ̃
Low	−ATR	a ã	

There is also a vowel */ə̃/ which is posited to explain syllabic nasal consonants in accounts of the language which state that Ikwerre has no nasal stops. This sound is realized as [ɨ̃] or a syllabic nasal which is homorganic to the following consonant. Alerechi (2018) states that while earlier sources treat [ɛ] as an allophone of /e/, this is only true for some dialects; in others, it is fully contrastive. In addition, Alerechi does not recognize a nasalized variant of this vowel.

==== Vowel harmony ====
Ikwerre exhibits two kinds of vowel harmony:

1. Every vowel in an Ikwerre word, with a few exceptions, agrees with the other vowels in the word as to the presence or absence of advanced tongue root.
2. Vowels of the same height in adjacent syllables must all be either front or back, i.e. the pairs /i/ & /u/, /ɪ/ & /ʊ/, /e/ & /o/, and /ɛ/ & /ɔ/ cannot occur in adjacent syllables. Vowels of different heights, however, need not match for frontness/backness either. This doesn't apply to the first vowel in nouns beginning with a vowel or with /ɾ/, and does not apply to onomatopoeic words.

=== Consonants ===
Derived from Clements & Osu (2003)
		Labial	Alveolar	Palatal	Velar		Glottal	
		Labial	Alveolar	Palatal	unrounded	rounded	unrounded	rounded
Plosive or Affricate	voiceless	p	t	tʃ	k	kʷ		
Plosive or Affricate	voiced	b	d	dʒ	ɡ	ɡʷ		
Fricative	voiceless	f	s					
Fricative	voiced	v	z					
Nonexplosive	plain	ḅ ~ m						
Nonexplosive	glottalized	ˀḅ ~ ˀm						
Tap			ɾ ~ ɾ̃					
Approximant			l ~ n	j ~ j̃	ɣ̞ ~ ɣ̞̃	w ~ w̃	h ~ h̃	hʷ ~ h̃ʷ

Derived from Alerechi (2018)
		Labial	Alveolar	Palatal	Velar	Labiovelar	Glottal
Nasal		m	n	ɲ	ŋ	ŋʷ	
Plosive or Affricate	voiceless	(p)	t	tʃ	k	kʷ	
Plosive or Affricate	voiced	(b)	d	dʒ	ɡ	ɡʷ	
Implosive	voiceless	ƥ					
Implosive	voiced	ɓ					
Fricative	voiceless	(f)	s			hʷ	h
Fricative	voiced	(v)	z				
Tap			ɾ				
Approximant			l	j	ɰ	w	

- Clements & Osu (2003) state that the oral consonants [ḅ ˀḅ l ɾ j ɣ̞ w h hʷ] occur before oral vowels, and their nasal allophones [m ˀm n ɾ̃ ȷ̃ ɣ̞̃ w̃ h̃ h̃ʷ] before nasal vowels. The "nonexplosive stops" [ḅ ˀḅ] are non-pulmonic and are equivalent to implosives in other varieties of Igbo. Clements & Osu (2005) later clarify that the nasals are non-phonemic, but are frequent due to nasal vowel-consonant harmony.
- Alerechi (2018) states that the consonants in parentheses occur in the Ọgbakiri dialect, while they may be allophonic or non-existent in other dialects. In addition, the palatal (postalveolar) fricatives [ʃ] and [ʒ] as well as the glottal stop [ʔ] may be heard, but are non-phonemic. Alerechi (2020) later clarifies that the phonological status of the affricates /tʃ dʒ/ is debated.

The tap /ɾ/ may sometimes be realized as an approximant [ɹ].

=== Tone ===
Ikwerre is a tonal language with seven tones: high or high rising, mid, low, high-low falling, high falling (rarer), mid-low falling and low rising. Ikwerre also has a partial downdrift. For example: rínya᷆ (high, mid-low falling) means "weight, heaviness", rìnyâ (low, high-low falling) means "female, wife", mụ̌ (rising) means "to learn", mụ̂ (high-low falling) means "to give birth", etc.
