= Igbo-Etche =

Igbo-Etche is one of the towns in Etche Local Government Area of Rivers State.

The town is bordered by Oyigbo (Obigbo) on the east and Rumokwurusi town on the west in Obio Akpor Local Government Area of the state.

The town is notable for its agricultural occupation of the inhabitants.

The community is one of the beneficiaries of Shell Petroleum Development Company Global Memorandum of Understanding projects in Oil producing communities in Rivers State.

Recently the governor of Rivers State, Nyesom Wike flagged off the construction of the Eneka-Igbo Etche Link road which will help to relieve the people of the town who have complained of poor road networks.
