= Trans Amadi =

Neighbourhood in Port Harcourt

- Neighbourhood of Port Harcourt
- Interactive map of Trans Amadi
- Coordinates: 4°48′53″N 7°2′14″E
- Country: Nigeria
- State: Rivers State
- LGA: Port Harcourt Local Government Area
- City: Port Harcourt

Area
  - Total: 1,000 ha (2,500 acres)
- Time zone: UTC+1 (WAT)
- Zip code: 500102

Trans Amadi is a thousand-hectare (2,500-acre) industrial area, as well as a diverse residential neighbourhood, in the city of Port Harcourt. Situated at 4°48'53" N latitude and 7°2'14" E longitude, the neighbourhood supports a strong manufacturing sector and is considered to be a major industrial zone in Port Harcourt. Materials such as glass bottles, tires, aluminium and paper have production plants in the area.

Trans Amadi lies in the north and is bordered by D/line in the south west, Woji township to the east and Rumuola to the north west. The main abattoir of the city is also located along Trans Amadi.

As of June 2003, there are 248 new and completed residential units existing with previous estimates of the total number of dwellings in the neighborhood.

== Education ==
The major schools providing educational services within the Trans Amadi axis are:

- Trans Amadi International School, 32 St. Andrew's Street, Rumuobiakani. A privately operated mainstream school serving the 2 to 11 age range.
- Dietams International Schools, Plot 85/86 Federal Housing Estate.
- Graceland International School
- Pleroma International School, Dennis Ufot Avenue, 21 Woji, Trans Amadi.

== Landmarks ==
The Port Harcourt Zoo is located in Trans Amadi. The zoo was first opened to the public on 1 October 1975.

Slaughter market

Nigerian Postal Service Trans Amadi

Among the notable places found in Trans Amadi are a number of private and public school buildings.
