= Rumuokoro =

Town in Obio-Akpor, Nigeria

Coordinates: 4°51′54″N 6°59′53″E

Rumuokoro is a town in Obio-Akpor, Rivers State, Nigeria. It is the meeting point of five major roads in Nigerian economy and the gateway to and from the city of Port Harcourt. The word, 'Rumuo' in Rumuokoro was believed to be coined by the Ikwere ethnic group of Rivers State.

Rumuokoro is one of the business hubs in the city of Port Harcourt. Along the roads are a number of commercial banks, boutiques, eateries and business centres.

Rumuokoro is an adjourning point to several routes in the Obio Akpor city of Rivers State. Places such as Choba (The location of the University of Port Harcourt), Rukpoku, Eliozu, Rumuodara, Rumuigbo can be accessed through Rumuokoro.

== Transport ==
It is the first point of call when arriving from Warri, Benin City, Lagos, Akure, Abuja, Owerri, Onitsha and the Port Harcourt International Airport. It has multiple bus stops and travellers can catch buses or taxis into any part of the Port Harcourt city from there.

== Communities ==
The Town consist of five communities; Rukpakwulusi, Eligbolo, Awalama, Rumuagholu and Elieke.

== Facilities ==
The strategic location of Rumuokoro makes it one of the most popular towns for travellers to Rivers State. Organisations located there include: Federal Government College Rumuokoro, Port Harcourt, Nigerian Army 2 Amphibious Brigade (Bori Camp), part of the Air force Base, Rumuokoro market and Okoro nu Odo Community Secondary School.
