= Anglican Diocese of Niger Delta North =

Anglican diocese in Nigeria

The Anglican Diocese of Niger Delta North is one of 18 within the Anglican Province of Niger Delta, itself one of 14 ecclesiastical provinces within the Church of Nigeria. The current Archbishop of Niger Delta Province & Bishop of Niger Delta North is Wisdom Budu Ihunwo, who was consecrated a bishop on June 3, 2018, at All Saints' Cathedral, Onitsha.

The diocese was inaugurated on May 16, 1996 (Ascension Day) at St Paul's Cathedral, Diobu, Port Harcourt. The first bishop was Samuel Onyuku Elenwo, who was translated from the Diocese of Niger Delta and retired on December 31, 1999. He was succeeded by Ignatius Crosby Ogborun Kattey, who was elected in February 2000 and consecrated on June 4 at the Cathedral of the Transfiguration, Owerri; he was elected Archbishop of the Niger Delta Province on May 23, 2009, and presented on May 27; he retired effective August 23, 2018.
