= Elele =

Town in Rivers State, Nigeria

Coordinates: 5°6′6.63″N 6°49′8.48″E

Elele is one of the big towns in Ikwerre Local Government Area of Rivers State, Nigeria. Madonna University is located in Elele in Ikwerre local government area. Elele, one of the major cities in Rivers State, is a medium-sized town in the Niger Delta Region. It has a population of about 20,620. The distance between Elele and Port Harcourt, the capital of Rivers, is roughly about 42 kilometres (26 mi) distant. It takes 445 kilometres (276 mi) to get from Elele to Abuja, the capital of Nigeria.

== Climate ==
In Elele, the wet season is overcast and warm, the dry season is hot and mostly cloudy, and it is oppressive year round.
