= Woji =

Town in Rivers State, Nigeria

Woji is a town located in Obio-Akpor Local Government Area in Rivers State, Nigeria. The town houses the ancient monarchical stool of Eze Oha Evo (Nyerisi Mbam Evo) of the Evo Kingdom.

== Name ==
Woji is named after the first son of Oro-Evo, a descendant of the Obio.
