= Obio-Akpor Local Government Council =

Local Government Council in Port Harcourt

Coordinates: 4°52′29″N 6°59′59″E

The Obio-Akpor City Council is located in Rivers State, Nigeria. It is the governing body for Obio-Akpor, a second-order administrative division. The council was created on 3 May 1989 to handle government at the local level. It performs this function through its own executive and legislative organs.

== Executive ==
The chairman is the chief executive and accounting officer of the council. The chairman is normally elected, but can, under special circumstances, be appointed. He or she has the duty to supervise the activities of the local government. The chairman is also responsible for presiding over all meetings of the council.

Members of the executive assist the chairman in performing his or her administrative duties. They include, vice-chairman, secretary and supervisory councilors. All members except the vice-chairman are appointed by the chief executive. Other key officials are head of the personnel management and local government treasurer.

== Legislative ==
Legislative powers vested in the local government council are exercised by the bylaws passed by its legislature and assented to by the chairman. The legislative arm comprises the leader, deputy leader, and councilors. There are 17 wards in Obio-Akpor, electing 17 councilors. Each ward consists of polling units of different geographical sizes.

== Functions of council ==
The major functions of the council are to:

1. debate, approve or amend the annual budget of the local government council subject to the chairman's veto which may be set aside by two-thirds majority of the members of the local government council;
2. vet and monitor the implementation of projects and programs in the annual budget of the local government;
3. examine and debate the monthly statements of income and expenditure rendered to it by the chairman of the local government;
4. advice, consult and liaise with the chairman of the local government.

== Current members ==
Officers:

- Chairman: Hon. Dr. Gift Worlu
- Deputy: Dr. Joyce Nyeche

== See also ==
- List of chairmen and caretaker committee chairmen of Obio-Akpor
- Politics of Rivers State
  - Elections in Rivers State
