= Aluu =

Community in Rivers State

Aluu is a community located in the Ikwerre Local Government Area of Rivers State, Nigeria. Situated near the city of Port Harcourt, it serves primarily as a residential area.

== Geography and location ==
Aluu is positioned approximately 18.8 kilometres (11.7 miles) from Port Harcourt, the capital of Rivers State. Its proximity to this urban center enhances its accessibility and has contributed to its development as a suburban community.

== Demographics and culture ==
The community is part of the Ikwerre ethnic group. Aluu comprises several villages, including Omuike, Omuoda, Omuahunwo, Omuchiolu, Omuoko, Omuigwe, Mbodo, Aluu Quarters, Omuihuechi, Omuokiri, Omuchukwu, Omuosa, Omuigwe New Layout, Omuchukwu Tank, and Aluu Square.
