= Ogbogoro =

Ogbogoro

Ogbogoro is a community in Obio/Akpor Local Government Area of Rivers State, Nigeria. It is located near Port Harcourt and forms part of the wider Akpor area. The community has a traditional leadership structure and shares its surrounding area with neighbouring communities.

Geography

Ogbogoro is situated in the Port Harcourt metropolitan area of Rivers State. It is connected to neighbouring communities, including Ozuoba and Rumuokwachi. Roads linking Ogbogoro with other parts of the metropolitan area serve residents, commuters and local businesses.

Traditional leadership

Ogbogoro has a traditional leadership system associated with the wider Akpor kingdom. Community leadership and land ownership have been important local issues.

In February 2022, reports stated that a Rivers State High Court ruling addressed a longstanding dispute over the traditional leadership position and ownership of a parcel of land in Ogbogoro. The ruling declared Chief Felix Amadi the paramount ruler of the community.

Community history

Ogbogoro has experienced community disputes and security challenges. A 2008 report by Human Rights Watch documented violence in the community during the period of political and gang-related unrest in Rivers State in 2007. The report described the effects of insecurity on residents and the community's traditional leaders.

Infrastructure and development

Road access and drainage have been important development issues in Ogbogoro and neighbouring communities. Reports in recent years have highlighted concerns about flooding and the condition of roads connecting the area with other parts of Port Harcourt.

These infrastructure issues affect transportation and the daily activities of residents.
