= Rumuodara =

Town in Port Harcourt, Nigeria

Coordinates: 4.85374°N 7.03238°E

Rumuodara is a town located in the region of Rivers State, Nigeria. Cities, towns and places near Rumuodara include Mbesilaru , Mpakurchi and Eliowhani.

Rumuodara is also referred to as a community. It is one of the communities found in Obio Akpor Local Government Area in Rivers State.

Rumuodara has a strategic central point which is called Rumuodara junction. This junction is an adjoining point to several other places around the axis of Rumuodara. This junction can lead to places such as Artillery Road, Eliozu, Eliowhani, Eneka, Tank, Eleme among others.
