= Choba, Port Harcourt =

Neighbourhood in Rivers State, Nigeria

Choba
- Neighbourhood
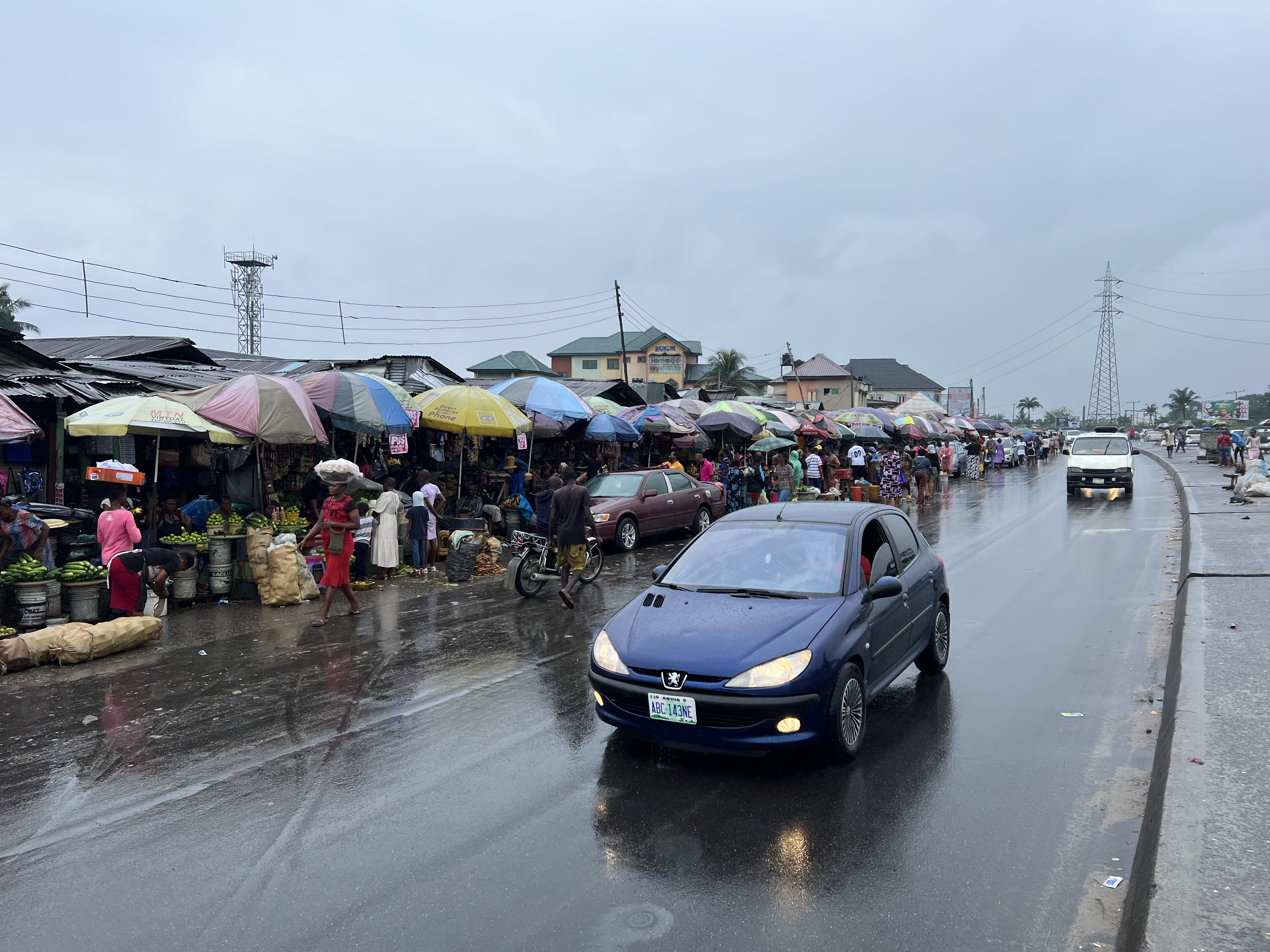
- Choba market (September 2022)

- Location of Choba in Port Harcourt, Nigeria
- Coordinates: 4°53′26″N 6°54′12″E
- State: Rivers State
- Local Government Area: Obio-Akpor

Government
  - Governor: Siminalayi Fubara - PDP

Population (2008)
  - Total: 27,253
- Time zone: UTC+1 (CET/WAT)
- Postal Code: 500102

Choba (audio ), Port Harcourt (audio) is a neighbourhood in Port Harcourt, Rivers State, Nigeria. It is located 16 km (9.9 mi) to the northwest of the Port Harcourt central business district, on the eastern bank of the New Calabar River.

Choba was originally an Ikwerre village on the outer fringes of Port Harcourt, governed by a paramount king. The current king is Eze Raymond Echendu. As Port Harcourt has expanded, Choba has assimilated into the greater city. Choba is one of 17 electoral wards administered by the Obio-Akpor Local Government Council. The population in 1991, according to the national census, was 10,968, in 1996 it was estimated to have increased to 12,980, and 27,253 in 2008.

It has a straight road that leads to a checkpoint heading to other states in Nigeria such as Bayelsa State and Delta State to the west. Choba market is primarily patronized by the students of the University of Port Harcourt and it is located along the East West Road by Choba Junction.

Choba is located 466km/290 miles from Abuja, Nigeria's Federal capital territory. The University of Port Harcourt is sited in Choba which brought about the influx of people into the area.

== Education ==
In 1975 the University of Port Harcourt was established in Choba. It is now one of the major contributors to the local economy and the area's population growth. It has three campuses in Choba. They are Abuja campus, Delta campus and Choba campus.

University of Port Harcourt is affiliated with the Association of Commonwealth Universities (ACU), Association of African Universities (AAU) and the University of Port Harcourt Teaching Hospital, which is also located at Choba. The university has a number of notable alumni, including former president of Nigeria GCFR, Goodluck Jonathan; Minister of transportation, Rotimi Amaechi and numerous Nigerian Senators.

Apart from the University of Port Harcourt and the University of Port Harcourt Teaching Hospital, there is a good number of public and private secondary schools near Choba Port Harcourt.

As part of community development, Total Energies under OML58 organises an annual Host Community Development Trainings and scholarship opportunities for their youths in Choba.

== See also ==
- Choba River
