= Paramount ruler =

Title

The term paramount ruler, or sometimes paramount king, is a generic description, though occasionally also used as an actual title, for a number of rulers' position in relative terms, as the summit of a feudalistic pyramid of rulers of lesser polities (such as vassal princes) in a given historical and geographical context, often of different ranks, which all recognize the single paramount ruler as their senior, though not necessarily with effectively commanding authority (as in a true empire), but often rather a notion like the Western suzerainty.

Whether the term is used where it could apply is essentially a matter of convention, and as the relatively vague, similar definitions overlap, its use may in certain cases coexist with the use of another term as those mentioned in the See also section.

== Examples ==
- In the Indian subcontinent, including present Pakistan and Bangladesh, the Turko-Persian Muslim Mughal emperors managed to bring most rulers of the so-called princely states, in majority Hindu, under their imperial authority. This was expressed in the majestic style of Padshah (like the Ottoman Sultan of Sultans and the Persian Shahanshah) of native Hindus. After a few generations they lost most of their power over the princes, and could hence rather be considered mere paramount rulers, at best receiving tribute and honorary trappings, while the true political hegemony progressively shifted to the new players, the Marathas, the Sikhs and the Eurochristian powers. After a struggle against France and its ally, Tippu Sultan (a short while styled Padishah Bahadur of Khudadad, a Muslim state in southern India), the British emerged victorious, mostly in the guise of the British East India Company. Later they encouraged the ruler of Awadh (Oudh) to reject the Mughal's suzerainty and assume the style of Padishah themselves, until the British finally toppled both; still later, the British Crown declared itself, as successors to the Mughal Paramountcy, Emperors of India.
- In the modern Republic of India, the term has been used to describe the Peshwa (though formally prime minister of the Maharaja Chatrapati of Satara who had lost power to him, so not a nominal head of state) or his constitutional master as hegemon of the Mahratta confederation, which failed in its nationalist bid for control over India against the British Raj.
- Yang di-Pertuan Agong, a Malay title usually translated as "Supreme Head", "Supreme Ruler" or "Paramount Ruler", is the official title of the constitutional head of state of the federal state of Malaysia, elected for five years from among nine monarchs of constitutive states on the Malaysian peninsula.
- Analogous is the President of the United Arab Emirates, formally elected by the rulers of the member states of the UAE from among their number, de facto hereditary in the person of the Hakim of Abu Dhabi emirate (not unlike the Habsburg emperors in the Holy Roman Empire).
- In the Comoros archipelago, certain rulers of a few major sultanates on Grande Comore have been recognized by the paramount title of Sultani tibe of the island.
- The Caliph of Islam is the head of the Muslim ummah, whose authority is theoretically recognised by Muslims across political borders. At various points in history, however, the political authority of the Caliph outside the domains of the Caliphate itself has waxed and waned before being completely abolished in 1924.
- The Holy Roman Emperors were elected by the Electorates of the Holy Roman Empire. The King-Grand Duke of Poland–Lithuania was similarly elected.

== Use for foreign rulers ==
- On 1 March 1900 the Samoan archipelago (a Polynesian nation, royal style O le Tupu o Samoa, from 7 November 1889 a tripartite German–British–U.S. protectorate, represented by the three Consuls) was annexed by Germany alone (except for the part that became American Samoa; hence long known as Western Samoa). The German Emperor Wilhelm II was styled there Tupu Sili o Samoa "Paramount King of Samoa" until the Allied take-over during World War I.
- The British monarch, styled King or Queen, is still recognised as Paramount Chief of Fiji, even after it became a republic within the Commonwealth, of which the monarch also is the sole Head.

== See also ==
- Great King – equivalent, among rulers who all can be considered Kings
- Hegemon – irrespective to titles, mere preponderance in power terms
- High King – equivalent, among rulers who all can be considered Kings
- King of Kings – equivalent, among rulers who all can be considered Kings
- Paramount Chief – equivalent in relative terms, but among tribal people without a fully developed state, often rather autonomous within a sovereign state
- Paramount Leader of China

== Sources and references ==
- WorldStatesmen see each present state
