= Obio-Akpor =

- LGA
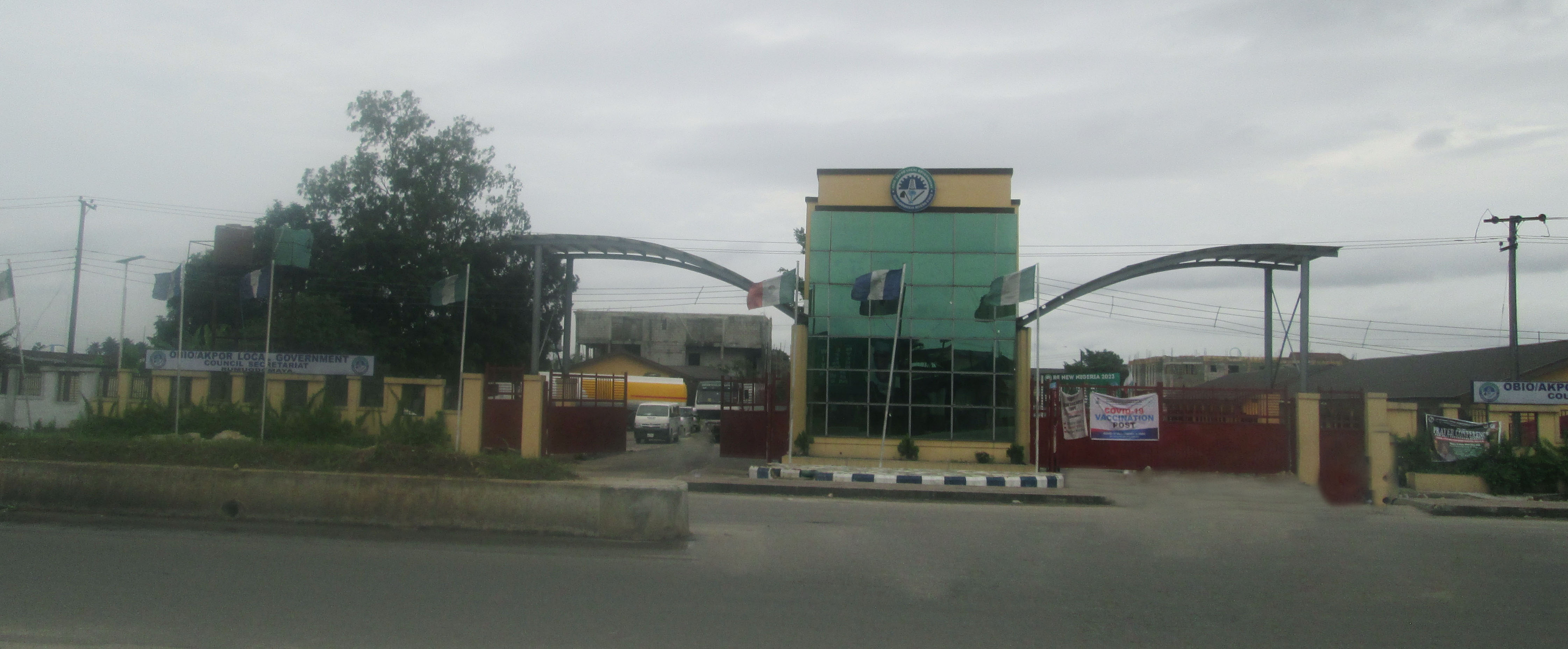
- Interactive map of Obio-Akpor
- Location within Nigeria Location within Africa
- Coordinates: 4°54′N 7°00′E
- Country: Nigeria
- State: Rivers State
- Headquarter: Rumuodomaya
- Date created: 3 May 1989
- Seat: Rumuodomaya

Government
  - Local Government Chairman: Chijioke K. Ihunwo (APP)
  - Deputy Local Government Chairman: Sophia Amarachi Nkoro (APP)
  - Governing Body: Obio-Akpor Local Government Council
  - MHAs: Victor Oko Jumbo (PDP); Michael O. Chinda (PDP)

Area
  - Total: 260 km^{2} (100 sq mi)
- Elevation: 30 m (98 ft)

Population (2006)
  - Total: 464,789
  - Density: 1,800/km^{2} (4,600/sq mi)
- Time zone: UTC+1 (WAT)
- ZIP code: 500102

Obio-Akpor is a Local Government Area in the metropolis of Port Harcourt in Rivers State, Nigeria. It is one of the major centres of economic activities in Nigeria, and one of the major cities of the Niger Delta region, with industries and companies like Pabod Breweries, Coca-Cola Company, Indomie Company and Port Harcourt Electricity Distribution Company.

The city covers 260 km^{2} (100 mi^{2}) and at the 2006 Census held a population of 464,789. Its postal code or ZIP code is 500102. Obio-Akpor has its secretariat and City hall at Rumuodomaya.

Obio-Akpor is constituted mainly by the people of the Ikwerre ethnic nationality.

Obio-Akpor is also known for fisheries and aquaculture.

== Geography ==
Obio-Akpor is bounded by Port Harcourt (local government area) to the south, Oyigbo and Eleme to the east, Ikwerre and Etche to the north, and Emohua to the west. It is located between latitudes 4°45'N and 4°60'N and longitudes 6°50'E and 8°00'E.

Obio-Akpor, is popularly known as the gateway city, because of its location. It has a land area of approximately 311.71 km^{2} (120.35 mi^{2}) and shares boundaries with Emohua, Ikwerre, Etche, Oyigbo, Eleme, Okirika, Port Harcourt Local Government Area of Rivers State and is accessible by road, sea, and air transportation.

Specifically, there are four prominent Ikwerre Kingdoms that constitute the Local Government Areas, which are: Akpor, Apara, Evo and Rumueme Kingdoms. It also has an average of 2.82% growth rate which puts the population of the Local Government Area as at 2004 to be over 500,000 people.

== Climate ==
In Obio-Akpor, rainfall is almost predictable and follows sequence of increase towards the months of July–August before decreasing in the months of November–February.

The month of December ushers in a relatively dry weather. This climatic condition is associated with sunshine and dry Harmattan wind. This climatic condition persists throughout the month of December and in the early weeks of January.

=== Geology and relief ===
Covering around 260 km^{2} (100 mi^{2}), Obio-Akpor is generally a lowland area with average elevation below 30 metres (98 feet) above sea level. Its geology comprises basically of alluvial sedimentary basin and basement complex. The thick mangrove forest, raffia palms and light rainforest are the major types of vegetation. Due to high rainfall, the soil in the area is usually sandy or sandy loam. It is always leached, underlain by a layer of impervious pan.

=== Localities, towns and suburbs ===
The following localities, townships and suburbs, are within Obio-Akpor:

- Alakahia
- Atali
- Ada-George Road
- Awalama
- Choba
- Egbelu
- Elelenwo
- Eligbam
- Elimgbu
- Elioparanwo
- Eliozu
- Eneka
- Eligbolo
- Iriebe
- Mgbuesilaru
- Mgbuoba
- Mgbuosimini
- Mpakurche
- Nkpa
- Nkpelu
- Ogbogoro
- Oginigba
- Oro-Igwe
- Oroazi
- Ozuoba
- Rukpakwolusi
- Rukpokwu
- Rumuadaolu
- Rumuaghaolu
- Rumualogu
- Rumuchiorlu
- Rumudara
- Rumudogo
- Rumuekini
- Rumuekwe
- Rumueme
- Rumuepirikom
- Rumuesara
- Rumuewhara
- Rumuibekwe
- Rumuigbo
- Rumukalagbor
- Rumunduru
- Rumuobiakani
- Rumuogba
- Rumuokparali
- Rumuolumeni
- Rumuobochi
- Rumuodomaya
- Rumuoji
- Rumuokoro
- Rumuokwu
- Rumuokwachi
- Rumuokwuota
- Rumuokwurusi
- Rumuola
- Rumuolukwu
- Rumuomasi
- Rumuomoi
- Rumuosi
- Rumuoto
- Rumurolu
- Rumuwaji
- Rumuwegwu
- Trans Amadi
- Woji

== Government ==
Obio-Akpor is one of the 8 local government areas that formed the Rivers East senatorial district. It consists of 17 electoral wards administered by the Obio-Akpor City Council. The council comprises the mayor who is the chief executive of the city, and other elected members who are referred to as councillors.

The mayor is normally elected. However, under special circumstances, the mayor can be appointed. The mayor oversees the activities of the city, and preside over meetings of the council.

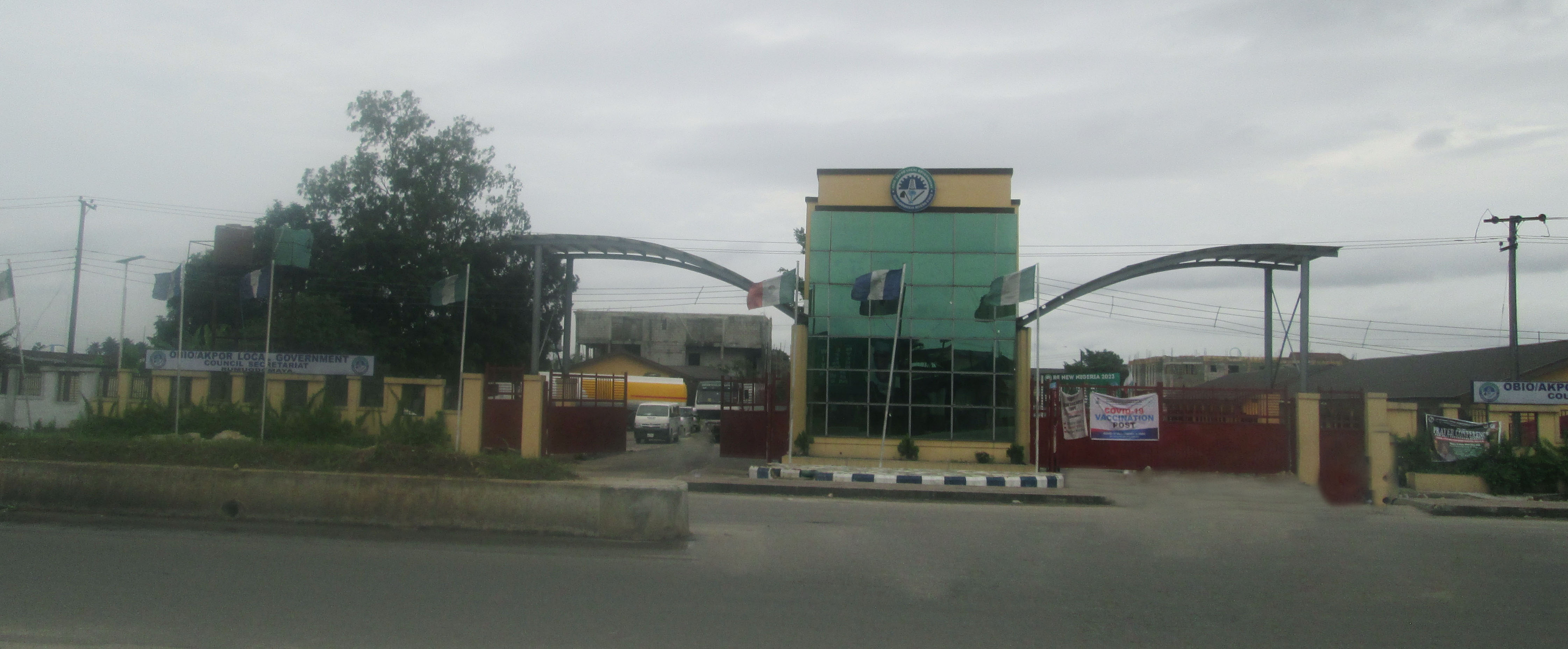
Main Gate, OBALGA

=== Wards ===
- Choba (ward)
- Elelenwo (3b)
- Oro-Igwe (ward)
- Ozuoba-Ogbogoro
- Rukpokwu (ward)
- Rumueme (7a)
- Rumueme (7b)
- Rumueme (7c)
- Rumuigbo (8a)
- Rumukwuta (8b)
- Rumuodara (ward)
- Rumuodomaya (3a)
- Rumuokoro (ward)
- Rumuokwu (2b)
- Rumuolumeni (ward)
- Rumuomasi (ward)
- Woji (ward)

=== Mayor ===
To date, only 7 individuals have served as Mayors of Obio-Akpor city council. The list below does not include persons who have served as either a caretaker committee chairman or an administrator. For that information, see list of chairmen and caretaker committee chairmen of Obio-Akpor.

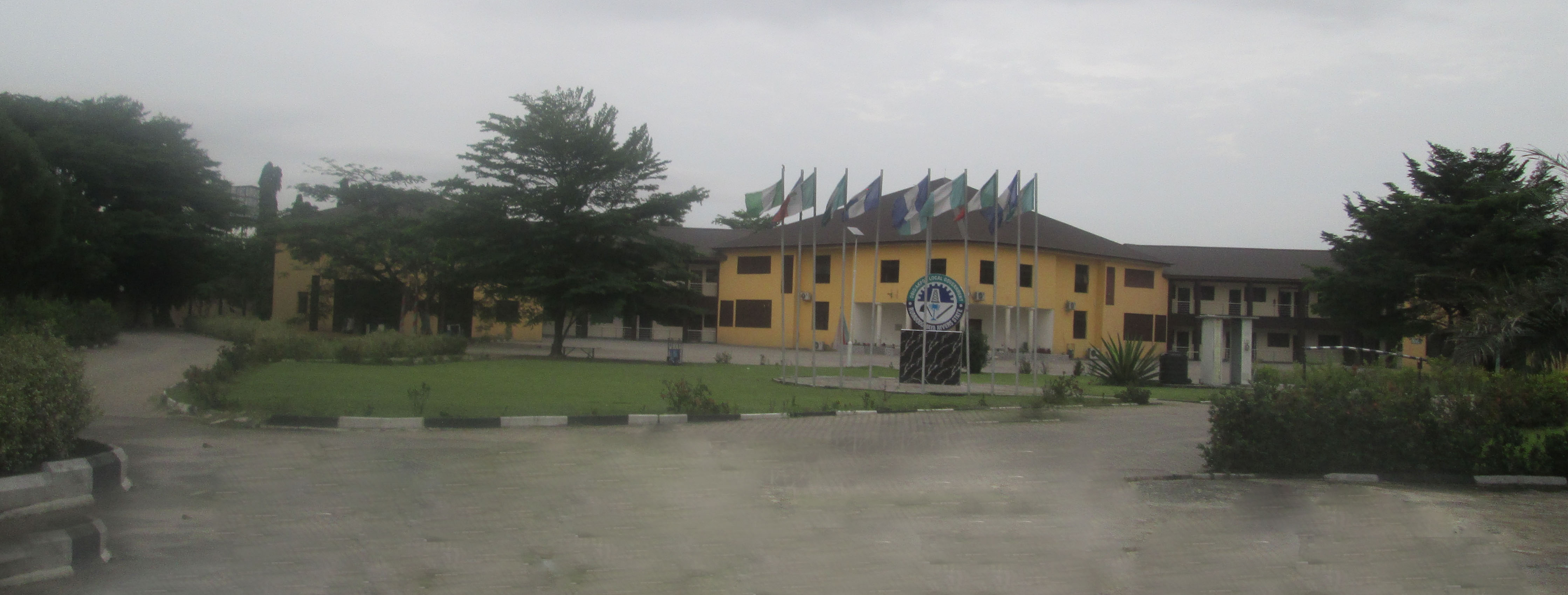
Admin Block, OBALGA

List of chairmen:

#	Name	Position	Took office	Left office	Comments
1	B.A. Worgu	chairman	May 1989	July 1989	Engineer
2	Ndumati Lawson Ndu	chairman	January 1991	June 1991	Chief
3	O.T. Weli	chairman	July 1991	June 1993	Engineer
4	L.W. Chukwu	chairman	April 1995	April 1996	JP
5	Freddy N.W. Ichegbo	chairman	April 1996	April 1997	Hon.
6	Ezenwo Nyesom Wike	chairman	1999	2002	Chief Barr.
7	Ezenwo Nyesom Wike	chairman	April 2004	June 2007	Chief Barr. 8   [Dike, Harcourt Whyte]     Chairman    June 2007     Sept. 2007    Academic
10	Timothy E. Nsirim	chairman	May 2011	November 2013	Hon.

== Education ==
=== Colleges and universities ===
Notable colleges and universities include:-

- Captain Elechi Amadi Polytechnic, Rumuola, Port Harcourt
- Catholic Institute of West Africa
- Eastern Polytechnic, Rumuokwurusi
- Ignatius Ajuru University of Education, Rumuolumeni
- Dr. Nabo Graham-Douglas Campus of the Nigerian Law School, Port Harcourt.
- Rivers State College of Health Science and Technology, Rumueme
- Rivers State University, Mile 3, Port Harcourt
- University of Port Harcourt, Choba

=== Primary and secondary schools ===
The region is home to several public and private schools for both elementary and secondary education. Below is a listing of schools operating in the local government area including those managed by the Roman Catholic Diocese of Port Harcourt:

- Archdeacon Crowther Memorial Girls' School, Elelenwo
- Ash Merlyn International School, Elelenwo
- CITA International School, Rumuogba
- Emilio Piazza Memorial School, Rumuigbo
- Government Secondary School, Eneka
- Jephthah Comprehensive Secondary School
- Loretto School of Childhood, Rumuigbo
- Marygold International School, Elelenwo
- Niger Delta Science School
- St Maria Goretti's School
- St. Benedict Immaculate Canadian Academy
- Trans Amadi International School

== Media ==
Obio-Akpor is one of the major hubs for media in Rivers State. Elelenwo is the location of Radio Rivers 99.1, the first government-owned FM radio station in the state, and the second FM radio station to launch in Nigeria. Also headquartered in the neighbourhood is Rivers State Television whose signal is received in parts of nine states.

In October 2003, DAAR Communications Plc launched its radio and television stations which are transmitted from Choba.

In 2008, Pidgin English radio station Wazobia FM 94.1 began broadcasting from its studios in Rumuosi.

Still in 2008, Multimesh Group established The Family Love FM radio station transmitting from Rumuogba.

== Notable people ==
- Julius Agwu, Nigeria stand-up comedian, actor, singer and MC
- John Azuta-Mbata, politician
- Kingsley Chinda, member of the House of Representatives
- Monalisa Chinda, actress
- Tonto Dike, actress
- Frank Eke, former Deputy Governor of Rivers State, Eze Gbakagbaka of Ikwerre II
- Duncan Mighty (born 1983), musician
- Daisy W. Okocha, former Chief Judge of Rivers State
- Ezenwo Nyesom Wike, Governor of Rivers State
- Obi Wali, PhD, former distinguished senator, writer, activist
- Okey Wali, SAN, former president of the Nigeria Bar Association
