= Timeline of Port Harcourt =

Capital of Rivers State, Nigeria

This is a timeline of the history of Port Harcourt, the capital of Rivers State, Nigeria.

== 19th century ==
- 1869 – A civil war in the Bonny Kingdom splits the polity into rival houses; Jaja leads the Opobo (Opubo) group to found Opobo at the Imo River estuary, reshaping trade routes across the Bonny–Imo river corridor near the future Port Harcourt area.
- 1884–1885 – Britain proclaims the Oil Rivers Protectorate over the Niger Delta (confirmed in the wake of the Berlin Conference), extending consular jurisdiction over the Bonny River approaches and adjacent creeks.
- 1893 – The Oil Rivers Protectorate is renamed the Niger Coast Protectorate, consolidating British administration across the eastern Niger Delta prior to amalgamation into Southern Nigeria in 1900.

== 20th century ==
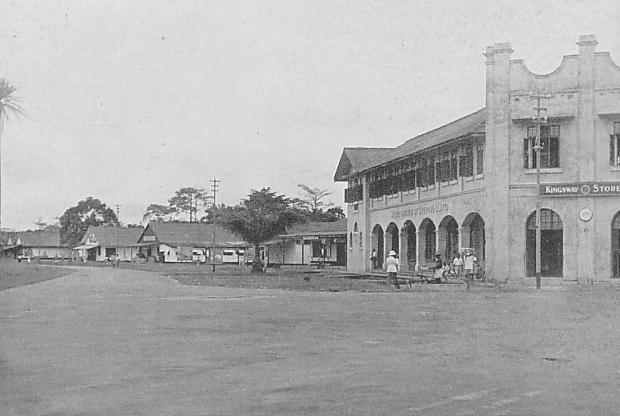
Port Harcourt in the 1930s

- 1925 – Braithwaite Memorial Hospital (now Rivers State University Teaching Hospital) begins operating.
- 1961 – Roman Catholic Diocese of Port Harcourt established.
- 1965 – Port Harcourt Refining Company founded at Alesa-Eleme.
- 1971 – Newspaper The Tide begins publication.
- 1972
  - Rivers State College of Science and Technology opens (later Rivers State University).
  - Sharks F.C. formed in Port Harcourt.
- 1975
  - University College, Port Harcourt created (later the University of Port Harcourt).
  - Port Harcourt Zoo established.
- 1977 – University College gains university status and becomes the University of Port Harcourt.
- 1980
  - Rivers State University of Science and Technology replaces Rivers State College of Science and Technology (now Rivers State University).
  - University of Port Harcourt Teaching Hospital begins operation.
- 1981 – Radio Rivers begins broadcasting.
- 1984 – Rivers State School of Basic Studies commences in Port Harcourt.
- 1985 – Rivers State Television (RSTV) inaugurated.
- 1988 – Dolphins football club founded.
- 1993 – Sister-city relationship with Kansas City formed.
- 1995 – Ken Saro-Wiwa and the Ogoni Nine are buried in Port Harcourt Cemetery.
- 1996 – Meridian Hospital begins operating.
- 1999 – Rivers State School of Basic Studies is revamped and renamed Rivers State College of Arts and Science.

== 21st century ==
- 2001 – Liberation Stadium (now Yakubu Gowon Stadium) opens.
- 2004
  - National Network newspaper begins publication.
- 2005 – Sosoliso Airlines Flight 1145 crashes.
- 2006
  - Port Harcourt International Airport stops operations for maintenance.
- 2008
  - Garden City Literary Festival begins (later renamed Port Harcourt Book Festival).
  - Street Rhymes Studios opens for business.
- 2009 – Port Harcourt International Airport named Nigeria's third-busiest airport.
- 2010 – Bus electrocutions accident occurs in the region.
- 2011 – 91.7 FM begins broadcasting.
- 2012
  - Port Harcourt selected 2014 World Book Capital.
  - Massacre of four Uniport students (Aluu killings).
- 2013
  - Kelsey Harrison Hospital and Rivers State Dental and Maxillofacial Hospital begin operations.
  - I'm on Fire becomes a successful Port Harcourt–based mixtape release.
  - Port Harcourt International Fashion Week begins.
  - Garden City Literary Festival is renamed the Port Harcourt Book Festival.
- 2014 – Port Harcourt hosts the World Book Capital programme events.

== See also ==
- Timelines of other cities in Nigeria: Ibadan, Kano, Lagos

== Bibliography ==
- Kevin Shillington, ed. (2005). "Port Harcourt". Encyclopedia of African History. Fitzroy Dearborn. ISBN 978-1-57958-245-6.
