= List of hospitals in Port Harcourt =

This is a list of some hospitals and medical centers in the city of Port Harcourt, Nigeria.

Name	Location		
Meridian Hospitals	D-Line		
Atinu Critical Care Hospital	Elelenwo		
Anderson's Hospital	Amaji street off Tombia, Port Harcourt	Braithwaite Memorial Specialist Hospital	Old GRA
Calvary Hospital	Orazi		
C.Bennett Specialist Hospital	Ada-George Road	Prandelli Dental Clinic	Rumuogba, Port Harcourt
Chris The King Hospital	Oyigbo		
Cova Care Specialist Hospital and Endoscopy Centre	Eliozu		
Daily Spring Hospital	Old GRA		
Dental and Maxillofacial Hospital	Garrison		
Destiny Hospital	Diobu		
El-Bene Hospital	D-line		
El-Specialist Hospital	D-line		
First Rivers Hospital	Rumuomasi		
Fountain Hospital	Diobu		
Getwell Hospital	Rumuokoro		
Good Heart Specialist Hospital	New GRA		
Golden Hands Medical Center	Obi-Wali		
Halten Hospital	D-line		
Higgwe Memorial Hospital	Rumuokoro		
Hilton clinics Adageorge Port Harcourt
Hopeville Specialist Hospital	Rumuola		
Jeconiah Children Hospital	D-line		
Kelsey Harrison Hospital	Diobu		
Alphonso Hospital	Elelenwo		
Military Hospital	New GRA		
Oasis Children's Hospital	Rumuodomaya		
Palmars Hospital	Old GRA		
Precious Life Hospital	D-line		
Princess Medical Center	Trans-Amadi		
Rehoboth Specialist Hospital	D-line		
Ridcol Hospital Limited	Airport Road		
Salem Hospital	Oyigbo		
University of Port Harcourt Teaching Hospital	East West Road		
Valentine Hospital	Old GRA		
Save A Life Mission Hospital	Stadium Road		
Sophike Medical Centre	Peter Odili		
Acron Medical Consultants	1 Acron Drive, GRA Phase IV		
Shield Specialists Hospital/The Pain Care Center	Peace Valley Estate, Trans Woji Road		
Kariden Specialist Hospital	Opposite.presidential hotel, Rumuola		
Kariden Diabetes and Endocrine Centre	Opposite presidential hotel, Rumuola		
