= Good Heart Specialist Hospital =

Private healthcare facility in Rivers State, Nigeria

Geography
- Location: Evo Road, New GRA, Port Harcourt, Rivers State, Nigeria
- Coordinates: 4°49′10″N 7°0′3″E

Organisation
- Care system: Private
- Type: Specialist

Services
- Emergency department: Yes

Links
- Other links: List of hospitals in Port Harcourt

Good Heart Specialist Hospital (also known as Good Heart Hospital or abbreviated GHSH) is a private healthcare facility in Rivers State, Nigeria. The hospital's owner is said to be a consultant cardiologist at the University of Port Harcourt Teaching Hospital.

== Location ==
Good Heart Specialist Hospital is situated on Evo Road, in the phase 2 of New GRA, about 1.3 km (0.8 mi) from D-line, Port Harcourt. The coordinates of the road on which the hospital building is sited are: 4°49'10.8"N, 7°0'3.5"E (Latitude:4.819675; Longitude:7.000985).

== In the news ==
The hospital was temporarily closed in August 2014 as were several medical centers where such cases were reported, after it was alleged that one of its patients, a doctor named Ikechukwu Enemuo, had died from Ebola. Reports revealed that Enemuo had contracted the virus while attending to an Ebola-infected ECOWAS staff who flew into Port Harcourt from Lagos for treatment in an unnamed hotel. The diplomat, however, recovered after being treated. Unfortunately, Mr. Ikechukwu Enemuo died after contact with the infected diplomat. He was rushed to GoodHeart Specialist Hospital where the medical director promptly alerted government agencies of the situation. He later died of the disease.

== See also ==
- List of hospitals in Port Harcourt
