= Stepping Stone Educational Centre =

Location
- 2 Okomoko Street; D-line, Port Harcourt, Rivers State; Nigeria; 4.8061815°N 7.0004344°E

Information
- Type: Private
- Established: 1977 (49 years ago)
- Founder: Mayen Itongha Fetepigi
- Status: Open
- Gender: Mixed
- Age: 3 to 18
- Campus type: Urban
- Website: ssecph.com

Stepping Stone Educational Centre is a private school for boys and girls located in the neighbourhood of D-line in Port Harcourt, Rivers State. It offers pre-elementary, elementary, junior high school, and senior high school level education.

== History ==
Founded as Maytime Nursery School in a garage at 42 Forces Avenue, Old GRA in 1977 by Mayen Itongha Fetepigi (OON), the school was intended to be a specialized nursery school to prepare its pupils for elementary school. It was later moved to the residence of the proprietress and her family at 28 Okoroji Street in D-line, where it was upgraded to elementary level due to demand from parents. During this time, Mrs. Fetepigi had already purchased 11 plots of land for the permanent site of the elementary school at 2 Okomoko Street in D-line, Port Harcourt. In 1993, the school gained full high school status, after which it was renamed to Stepping Stone Educational Centre.

== Objectives and goals ==
- To train up a child in the way he or she should grow.
- To inculcate in the child the fear of the Lord, which the Bible says is the beginning of wisdom.
- To give the child a total education.

== See also ==
- List of schools in Rivers State
- Port Harcourt (local government area)
