= Port Harcourt (local government area) =

- LGA
- Interactive map of Port Harcourt
- Location within Nigeria Location within Africa
- Coordinates: 4°47′N 7°01′E
- Country: Nigeria
- State: Rivers State
- Seat: Port Harcourt

Government
  - Local Government Chairman: Sam B. Kalagbor (Administrator)

Area
  - Total: 109 km^{2} (42 sq mi)

Population (2023)
  - Total: 1,865,000
  - Density: 17,100/km^{2} (44,300/sq mi)
- per The World Population Review
- Time zone: UTC+1 (WAT)
- Website: https://phlg.com.ng

Port Harcourt Local Government Area (PHALGA) is a Local Government Area (LGA) of Rivers State in Southern Nigeria. It is one of the 23 local government areas created for the state. Its administrative seat is located in Port Harcourt. The LGA consists of one ethnic group, the ikwerre.. The Ikwerre people of Rivers State speak The Ikwerre language.

== Geography ==
Port Harcourt local government area is included in the Greater Port Harcourt region. It is situated 52 kilometres (32 mi) southeast of Ahoada and about 40 kilometres (25 mi) northwest of Bori. It is bounded to the south by Okrika, to the east by Eleme, to the north by Obio-Akpor and to the west by Degema. It has a total size of 109 square kilometres (42 sq mi).

=== Towns, urban communities and neighbourhoods ===
- Azuabie Town
- Abuloma
- Agip
- Amadi Ama
- Borokiri
- Bundu Ama
- D-line
- Diobu
- Eagle Island
- Elekahia
- Fimie Ama
- Koko Ama
- Marine Base
- New GRA
- Nkpogu
- Nkpolu Oroworukwo
- Ogbumnuabali
- Old GRA
- Old Port Harcourt Township
- Oroabali
- Oroada
- Orochiri
- Orogbum
- Orolozu
- Oromeruezimgbu
- Oroworukwo
- Oromineke
- Ozuboko Ama
- Rebisi
- Rumukalagbor
- Rumuobiekwe
- Rumuwoji
- Tere-Ama
- Okuru-Ama

== Demographics ==
The total population in the area was last recorded at 638,360 people in 2011 from 538,558 in 2006.

The 2023 population of Cities in Nigeria, according to The World Population Review, Port Harcourt is ranked 4th on the list with a population of 1,865,000.

== Government ==
The local government area is part of the Rivers East Senatorial district consisting of 20 electoral wards. The mayor, who is the highest-ranking official in the Port Harcourt local government is elected by popular vote and presides as both head of wards and head of the local government council.

The current mayor of Port Harcourt is Sir. All well Ihunda

=== Wards ===
- Abuloma-Amadi Ama

(20)

- Diobu (ward)
- Elekahia (ward)
- Mgbundukwu (1)
- Mgbundukwu (2)
- Nkpolu Oroworukwo (ward)
- Nkpolu Oroworukwo (2)
- Ochiri-Rumukalagbor
- Ogbumnuabali (ward)
- Oroabali (ward)
- Orogbum (ward)
- Oromineke-Ezimgbu
- Oroworukwo (ward)
- Port Harcourt Township
- Port Harcourt Township VI
- Port Harcourt VII
- Rumuobiekwe (ward)
- Rumuwoji (1)
- Rumuwoji (2)
- Rumuwoji (3)

=== List of mayors of Port Harcourt ===
The following list shows the mayors of Port Harcourt:

- Richard Okwosha Nzimiro (the first mayor of Port Harcourt.
- Ambrose Ezeolisa Allagoa
- Victor Ihunwo Nyeche

== Education ==
=== Tertiary ===
Rivers State University currently has its main campus at Nkpolu Oroworukwo, although plans are in progress to relocate the institution to a new 212-hectare/524-acre site within the Greater Port Harcourt urban centre.

=== Primary and secondary ===
Many private schools including some government schools are located in and around this area. Primary education in many cases starts at the age of 4 for majority of Riverians. Students spend five or six years in primary school and graduate with a school leaving certificate. At the secondary level, students spend six years, that is 3 years of JSS (Junior Secondary School), and 3 years of SSS (Senior Secondary School).

The following are primary (elementary) and secondary schools (high schools) operating within the Port Harcourt local government area:

- Staff School Abuloma
- Baptist High School, Borokiri
- First Baptist Academy 93 Agreey Road, Port Harcourt
- Bereton Montessori Nursery and Primary School, Old GRA
- Emarid College
- Faith Baptist College, Old GRA
- Government Comprehensive Secondary School, Borokiri
- Graceland International School, Elekahia
- Greenoak International School, New GRA
- Holy Rosary College, Old GRA
- Halle College
- Methodist Girls High School
- Federal Government Girls College, Abuloma
- Norwegian International School
- Our Lady of Fatima College, Borokiri
- St. Mary's Catholic Model High School
- Starlets Academy, Old GRA
- Stella Maris College
- Stepping Stone Educational Centre
- Tantua International Group of Schools
- Doic Early Learning Centre, Elekahia
- Randolph Group of Schools, Diobu PHC

== Notable people ==
- Adokiye Amiesimaka, soccer player
- Emmanuel C. Aguma, lawyer, Attorney General of Rivers State
- Worgu Boms, lawyer
- Ibinabo Fiberesima, actor, film producer
- Agbani Darego, model and fashion designer
- Finidi George, soccer player
- Chinyere Igwe, political figure
- Austin Opara, former Deputy Speaker of the House of Representatives of Nigeria
- Joseph Yobo, soccer player
- Nimi Briggs, Academic, 5th vice chancellor of the University of Port Harcourt
- Tonto Dikeh Actress
- Ada George former Governor
- Asari dokubo
- Monalisa Chinda actor, film producer
- Ricky Owubokiri, soccer player
- Thankgod Amaefule, Nigerian former professional footballer who played as a striker

== See also ==
- Local government areas of Rivers State
- List of cities and towns in Rivers State
- List of people from Port Harcourt
