= Mile One Market, Port Harcourt =

Market in Port Harcourt, Nigeria

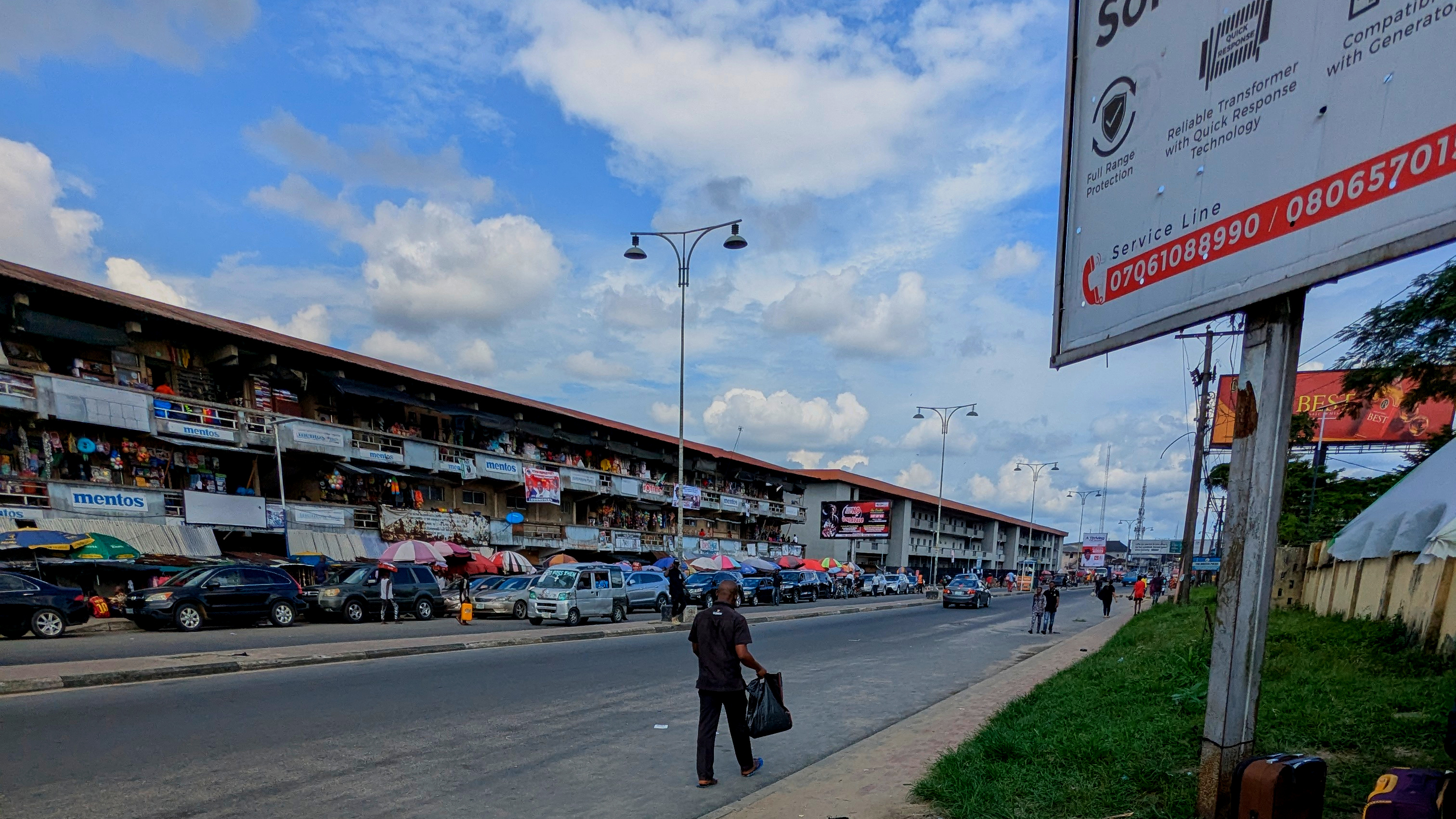
Side view of Mile on Market, Port Harcourt, Rivers State, Nigeria

Mile One Market, Port Harcourt is a multipurpose market located at Diobu metropolis in Port Harcourt, the capital City of River State, Nigeria. The market is known for selling a variety of products, including food, clothing and electronics. In 2013, the Mile One Market, which is located along Ikwerre Road in Port Harcourt, was razed down by the fire. This led to loss of goods worth millions of Naira.

== Market Management Committee ==
In 2018, traders at the Mile One Market, Port Harcourt, appealed to the River State Governor, Governor Nyesom Ezenwo Wike to scrab the existing Market Management Committee due to leadership in the Market.

== See also ==
- Port Harcourt
- Diobu
- Old GRA
- Borikiri
