= Military Hospital, Port Harcourt =

Hospital in Nigeria

Geography
- Location: New GRA, Port Harcourt (local government area), Rivers State, Nigeria
- Coordinates: 4°49′36″N 7°0′11″E

Organisation
- Type: Military hospital

Links
- Lists: Hospitals in Nigeria

The Military Hospital formerly called Delta Clinic is an Armed Forces health facility in New GRA, Port Harcourt (local government area), Rivers State, Nigeria. The hospital was originally built by Shell-BP in the early 60's to serve as a centre of medical care for the company’s expatriate and local staff. Presently, the hospital is owned by the government of Nigeria.

== See also ==
- Military hospital
- List of hospitals in Port Harcourt
