= Port Harcourt Golf Club =

Public golf club in Nigeria

Club information
- Location: 31A Forces Avenue, Old GRA, Port Harcourt, Rivers State
- Established: 1928
- Type: Public
- Owner: Government of Rivers State
- Total holes: 18
- Tournaments: Port Harcourt Classic
- Designed by: Thomas Collins
- Par: 70
- Length: 5,457 m (17,904 ft; 5,968 yd)

The Port Harcourt Golf Club is a public golf club established in 1928. It is one of oldest golf clubs in Nigeria with an 18-hole, par 70, 5,457 m (17,904 ft; 5,968 yd) course. It was designed by Thomas Collins.

The golf club is located at 31A Forces Avenue, Old GRA, Port Harcourt, Rivers State. Over the years, the club has played host to both local and national golf tournaments.
