= Meridian Hospital =

Private hospital in Nigeria

Meridian Hospitals

Geography
- Location: D-line, Port Harcourt, Rivers State, Nigeria
- Coordinates: 4°48′2″N 6°59′55″E

Services
- Emergency department: Yes

Helipads
- Helipad: No

History
- Founded: 1996

Links
- Website: meridianhospitals.net
- Lists: Hospitals in Nigeria
- Other links: List of hospitals in Port Harcourt

Meridian Hospital (also spelled Meridian Hospitals) is a private hospital located in the neighbourhood of D-line in Port Harcourt, Rivers State, Nigeria. It was founded in 1996 in a rented apartment complex in Diobu. In 2003, the hospital moved into its own building at 21 Igbokwe Street. Its capacity and workforce were subsequently increased to keep up with the growing healthcare demands.

== Description and features ==
Meridian Hospital is bounded roughly by Government Girls Secondary School, Orominike on the north, St Thomas Anglican Church, Ikwerre Road on the south, Kaduna Street on the east and A police station on the west. The 55m long by 18m wide three-storey hospital sits on a 32, 670-square-foot (3, 035 m^{2}) land. It includes a reception area, a 45-car parking lot and a lift system. Other features are, air-conditioned and fully IT-enabled rooms, uninterruptible power and water supply, 24-hour security, modern diagnostic equipments, internet access/computers and attentive staff.

== Services ==
- Medical and Emergency
- Maternity
- Imaging
- Laboratory
- Surgery
- Consultation
- Radiology
- Physiotherapy
- Urology
- Obstetrics and Gynaecology
- Ophthalmology
- Dental Services

== See also ==
- List of hospitals in Port Harcourt
