= Braithwaite Memorial Specialist Hospital =

Rivers State University Teaching Hospital (formerly known as Braithwaite Memorial Specialist Hospital) (abbreviated as BMSH) is a government hospital in Port Harcourt, named after Eldred Curwen Braithwaite, a British doctor and a pioneer of surgery. It is located in Old GRA, Rivers State a neighbourhood of Port Harcourt and is operated by Rivers State Hospital Management Board. It was established in March 1925 as Braithwaite Memorial Hospital and originally served as a medical facility for senior civil servants. It later became a General Hospital and has since gained status as a "Specialist Health Institution". In 2018, it was renamed to serve as a Teaching Hospital for the state owned university following the establishment of college of medical sciences.

Officially recognized by the Federal Ministry of Health, Braithwaite Memorial Specialist Hospital is ranked among the largest hospitals in the Niger Delta. The facility has 375 licensed beds and 731 medical staff members. Its departments include Medicine, Paediatrics, Laboratories, Radiology, Family Medicine, Obstetrics & Gynaecology, Anaesthesia, Surgery, Pathology, Ophthalmology, Accident Centre and the Surgical/Medical Emergency. Some other departments are Pharmacy, Finance, Maintenance, General Administration.

== See also ==
- Kelsey Harrison Hospital
- List of hospitals in Port Harcourt
