= Faith Baptist College =

Location
- 2 Rumuoparaeli Street; Old GRA, Port Harcourt, Rivers State; Nigeria; 4.7915°N 7.0051°E

Information
- Type: Private, high school
- Motto: Excellence, Discipline and Fear of God
- Established: 9 October 2000; 25 years ago
- Principal: Charles Akah
- Gender: Mixed
- Age: 10 to 18
- Classes: JSS1 to SS3
- Campus type: Urban
- Colours: Red Brown and White
- Tuition: ₦39,500
- Affiliation: Nigerian Baptist Convention
- Internet access: Yes
- Website: faithbaptistcollegephc.sch.ng

Faith Baptist College (FBC) is a Baptist private, coeducational secondary school located in the Old GRA neighborhood of Port Harcourt, the Rivers State capital. It is affiliated with the Nigerian Baptist Convention. Its motto is "Excellence, Discipline and Fear of God."

== History ==
The school was founded on 9 October 2000 by the Faith Baptist Church in Port Harcourt. It started with only 13 students in the first year of admissions. Initially, teachers were brought from the Faith Baptist Senior Primary School. Full-time teaching staff arrived during the second year.

== Administration ==
The first principal of the school was Rev. Ibioseya D. Amachree. The current principal is Charles Akah.

Faith Baptist College has a school management board, and is managed based on policy frameworks formulated by this board.

== Facilities ==
One of the school's major priorities is to provide facilities for students, as well as all citizens aspiring for secondary school education. Facilities include: Science laboratories for physics, chemistry and biological studies. Others are home economics, creative arts, basic technology workshops, along with a functional library and ICT training rooms.
