= Kelsey Harrison =

Nigerian maternal health scientist

- Born: 1933 (age 92–93); Abonnema, Rivers State
- Citizenship: Nigeria
- Known for: Maternal health
- Awards: NNOM, Nigerian Centenary awards, George Macdonald Medal
- Scientific career
- Workplaces: University of Ibadan, Ahmadu Bello University, University of Port Harcourt

Kelsey Atangamuerimo Harrison is an emeritus professor of obstetrics and gynaecology and former vice-chancellor of University of Port Harcourt, who contributed immensely to studies of maternal health, especially during pregnancy. As a researcher at the University of Ibadan, he mapped out the effects of severe anaemia on the mother and her baby, and established the safety of treating gross anaemia by packed cell transfusion combined with rapidly acting diuretic. He was also part of a group that discovered the dangerous threat posed by sickle cell disease to maternal and fetal lives among Africans. In Zaria, the results of the work of a team he led, became the most powerful boost to international advocacy for better maternal and perinatal health in developing countries.

== Life ==
Professor Kelsey Atangamuerimo Harrison was born in Abonnema, Rivers State, on 9 January 1933. He received his primary school education locally at Bishop Crowther Memorial School. After an outstanding secondary school career at Government College Umuahia, he trained at University College Ibadan and at University College Hospital London, graduating MB BS with honours and distinction in Obstetrics and Gynaecology in 1958.

Towards specializing in obstetrics and gynaecology, he received his postgraduate research and clinical training in Nigeria and United Kingdom, most notably under John Lawson in Ibadan, W.C.W Nixon in London, and F. E. Hytten in various UK Medical Research Council units. He became a member in 1964, and a fellow in 1973, of the Royal College of Obstetricians and Gynaecologists in London. Already a foundation member of the Society of Gynaecology and Obstetrics of Nigeria in 1965, he was professor of obstetrics and gynaecology, first in Ibadan in 1972, then in Zaria from 1972 to 1981, and lastly in Port Harcourt, 1981–1998, where he became that university's Vice-Chancellor from 1989 to 1992, having earlier been the Dean of the Faculty of Medicine of Ahmadu Bello University Zaria. He retired from the Nigerian university system in 1998, and was appointed in July 1999, an emeritus professor of obstetrics and gynaecology at the University of Port Harcourt.

He is a recognised authority on anaemia, sickle cell disease and malaria in pregnancy. His researches on anaemia at Ibadan University led to the development of the solution to the serious life-threatening problem of extreme anaemia in late pregnancy. Another group to which he belonged, unraveled the influence of several haemoglobinopathies on pregnant women and their babies under African conditions, and how best to deal with the most dangerous of them, namely sickle cell disease. In Zaria, his collaborative studies on malaria in pregnancy discovered that protecting early teenage pregnant girls against malaria and anaemia conferred a hitherto unknown benefit: the protected girls grew taller, they produced bigger babies, yet the proportion of those of them who developed cephalopelvic disproportion and needed operative delivery, fell sharply. This offers hope that in malaria endemic areas, obstructed labour and vesicovaginal fistula (VVF) might be prevented by protecting these vulnerable girls against malaria and by adding nutritional supplements to their diets during pregnancy.

The Zaria Maternity Survey, by a team Harrison led, was his most influential work. Between 1976 and 1979, Harrison and his colleagues collected data on over 22,000 births that when analysed threw open the problems of traditional forms of interference, of adolescent marriage and pregnancy, of women's inferior status, and of their neglect in pregnancy, labour and afterwards, and of the consequences of this neglect especially high levels of both maternal mortality and VVF. The strongest message that came through this work was that both maternal and perinatal health benefited hugely when women were educated, but not when they were illiterate. Harrison concluded that although the real priority in the area is reducing maternal deaths, the real problem to be faced is not so much medical but sociological, and that the eradication of mass illiteracy through universal formal education is a fundamental key to better maternal health. In other words, if we want to reduce maternal mortality we should stop looking at the problem in isolation. Harrison's work, published by the British Journal of Obstetrics and Gynaecology in October 1985, gave the details. The work is still being seen as a major advance in maternity care, and in their advocacy for better maternal and perinatal care, various agencies have adopted the idea. The Safe Motherhood Initiative in 1987, and the "Education for All" campaign in 1990, both by United Nations agencies, were early examples.

Back in Zaria, the activities of the team Harrison led, which included sociologists, succeeded in eradicating VVF in the Zaria area in the 1970s, although it resurged after he left the area.

Besides Harrison's heavy clinical, teaching and research activities, he took an active part in various community services and international assignments throughout his working life and afterwards. In the 1970s, it was the rehabilitation of sections of the health care services of the Rivers state of Nigeria, destroyed through military operations in the country's civil war. As part of the post-civil war rehabilitation effort, he helped to ensure that displaced students of Eastern Nigeria origin were reabsorbed back to their former places in university of Ibadan. In the same decade, he was a member of the medical research council of Nigeria. In the 1980s, he took part in various WHO technical working groups on anaemia, maternal mortality and VVF. In the 1990s, he influenced the formation of the National Foundation of VVF - a local NGO - becoming its president in 1997–1998. Its activities placed the surgical treatment of VVF in Nigeria's national agenda. The WHO and other powerful international organisations and many NGOs have since taken over the concept and extended it to other African and some Asian countries.

Kelsey Harrison published widely. Among them are four books and more than 100 medical journal articles. The two most widely known are the report on the Zaria Maternity Survey and his autobiography. His latest work, titled Open These Gates, was published in 2018.

== Awards and recognition ==
Kelsey Harrison became a College Scholar of University College Ibadan in 1952 - 1955. He earned the Doctor of Medicine degree of University of London in 1969 with a thesis on Blood Volume in Severe Anaemia in Pregnancy. In 1987, he received the triennial George Macdonald Medal awarded jointly by the Royal Society of Tropical Medicine and Hygiene and the London School of Hygiene and Tropical Medicine. It was "for outstanding research leading to improvement of health in tropical countries". In 1988, he was awarded the higher doctorate degree – Doctor of Science (Medicine) London - for his distinguished work and publications on the theme of "childbearing under adverse socioeconomic conditions with special reference to Black Africa". The Nigerian National Order of Merit came in 1989." He is a Fellow of the Academy of Science of Nigeria since 1988. For ten years, 1991 – 2001, he was a Foundation Member of the International Advisory Board of The Lancet medical journal. Among his prestigious public lectures are the William Meredith Fletcher Shaw Memorial Lecture for the year 1995 at the Royal College of Obstetricians and Gynaecologists in London and titled "Poverty, deprivation and maternal health", and the 7th Professor Olikoye Ransome Kuti Memorial Lecture titled "Reducing Maternal Mortality in Nigeria: Looking Back and Looking Forward”. delivered in Lagos in June 2012. In the latter, he outlined significant events in the struggle against maternal mortality and VVF in Nigeria. In 2009, the Government of Rivers State of Nigeria named its newest hospital in Port Harcourt, after him. Most recently in February 2014, he was awarded the Nigerian Centenary Honours award by the President of Nigeria, Dr. Goodluck Ebele Jonathan. April 2022: Royal College Of Obstetricians and Gynaecologists London Distinguished Service Medal for "outstanding services to obstetrics and gynaecology."

== Personal interests ==
On retirement from the Nigerian university system in 1998, he moved to Finland where he lives with his wife, Irma Seppanen, herself a retired public health chief matron. His son, his daughter, and two young adult granddaughters, live in United Kingdom.

Good at games, drama and music (piano) at college, Harrison also led the college choir. He regularly played cricket to a high standard in Ibadan and London and subsequently for Nigeria in the 1950s and 60s as opening batsman and wicket keeper. His current interests include gardening, music appreciation, and reading.

== See also ==
- Kelsey Harrison Hospital
- Government College Umuahia
