= Rehoboth Specialist Hospital =

Coordinates: 4°47′44″N 6°59′59″E

Geography
- Location: 2 Winners Way, D-line, Port Harcourt, Rivers State, Nigeria

Organisation
- Care system: Private
- Type: Specialist

Services
- Emergency department: Yes
- Beds: 59
- Speciality: Orthopaedic Surgery

History
- Founded: 1993

Links
- Other links: List of hospitals in Port Harcourt

Rehoboth Specialist Hospital, also known simply as Rehoboth Hospital, is a private medical facility in Rivers State, Nigeria. The hospital is situated in the residential area of D-line, Port Harcourt, roughly 3.2 km (2 mi) west of Trans Amadi. Its departments include Surgical Services, Laboratory, Pharmacy, Orthopaedics, Medicine, and Obstetrics, which includes epidural in labour and Gynaecology.

As of July 2013, the hospital's medical director is Prof. Aniekan Ekere.

== See also ==
- List of hospitals in Port Harcourt
