= Port Harcourt Water Corporation =

Nigerian state government agency

Agency overview
- Formed: 2012
- Preceding agency: State Water Supply
- Jurisdiction: Rivers State Government
- Agency executive: Ibibia O. Walter, Group managing director
- Website: www.portharcourtwater.com

Port Harcourt Water Corporation, formerly part of the Rivers State Water Board, is the principal supplier of water and wastewater management throughout Rivers State. It is owned by the Rivers State Government.

== Activities ==
The body is responsible for the provision of urban water supply and wastewater management for Port Harcourt and Obio/Akpor Local government area of Rivers State.

The Port Harcourt Water Corporation has developed a Water Supply Master Plan as a "Road Map" to solve the water scarcity problem in the state and ensure provision of water to homes in the state.

The governing body of the company was inaugurated by Governor Nyesom Wike in 2018, with Doris Daba Cowan appointed as the chairman. PHWC became corporatized on the 12th Aug 2012, by the passage of the Rivers State Water Sector Development Law No. 7 of 2012.

The body has secured the Urban Water Sector Reform and Port-Harcourt Water Supply and Sanitation Project (UWSR & PHWSSP), and the Third National Urban Water Sector Reform Project (NUWSRP3) which is funded by the World Bank, African Development Bank and the Rivers State Government.
