= Timeline of Kano =

The following is a timeline of the history of the city of Kano, Nigeria.

== Prior to 20th century ==
- 999 CE - Bagauda in power.
- 1095 - City wall construction begins.
- 1349 - Yaji I in power.
- 1430 - Kano becomes capital of the Sultanate of Kano.
- 1463 - Muhammad Rumfa in power.
- 1480 - Gidan Rumfa (palace) built (approximate date).
- 1807 - Sokoto jihad active; Kano becomes capital of the Kano Emirate.
- 1819 - Ibrahim Dabo in power.
- 1890s - Kano Chronicle compiled.
- 1893 - Tukur-Yusufu succession conflict.

== 20th century ==
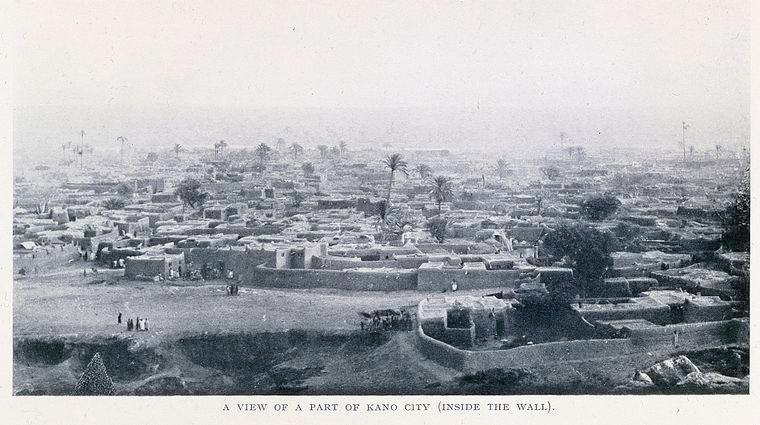
Kano city, Nigeria, circa 1910s

- 1903 - February: British in power.
- 1905 - Kano becomes capital of British colonial Northern Nigeria Protectorate.
- 1909 - Nassarawa School established.
- 1911 - Lagos-Kano railway begins operating.
- 1930 - Kano Girls' School established.
- 1931 - Daily Comet newspaper begins publication.
- 1932 - Water and Electric Light Works inaugurated.
- 1936 - Airport begins operating.
- 1937 - Rex cinema opens.
- 1951 - Masalla cin Jumma'an (mosque) built.
- 1952
  - Palace cinema opens.
  - Population: 130,173.
- 1953 - 1 May: Kano riot of 1953.
- 1967 - City becomes capital of the newly established Kano State.
- 1970 - Murtala Muhammad Mosque built in Fagge.
- 1975 - Population: 399,000.
- 1977 - Bayero University Kano established.
- 1980
  - Yan Tatsine religious unrest.
  - Triumph newspaper begins publication.
  - Hausawa mosque built.
- 1982 - No Man's Land mosque and Yar Akwa mosque built.
- 1985 - Population: 1,861,000 (urban agglomeration).
- 1986 - Hotoro mosque built.
- 1987 - Goron Dutse mosque built.
- 1988 - Goron Dutse Islamiyya secondary school opens.
- 1990
  - Kano Pillars Football Club formed.
  - Population: 2,095,000 (urban agglomeration).
- 1995 - Population: 2,339,000 (urban agglomeration).
- 1998 - Sani Abacha Stadium opens.
- 2000 - Population: 2,602,000 (urban agglomeration).

== 21st century ==
- 2006 - Population: 2,163,225 city; 2,828,861 metro.
- 2010
  - August: Flood.
  - Population: 3,271,000 (urban agglomeration).
- 2012 - 20 January: Boko Haram attack.
- 2013
  - Northwest University Kano opens.
  - Mallam Aminu Kano International Airport remodelled.
- 2014 - 18 May: Boko Haram attack.

== See also ==
- Kano history
- List of rulers of Kano
- List of governors of Kano State
- Timelines of other cities in Nigeria: Ibadan, Lagos, Port Harcourt

== Bibliography ==
Arabic manuscripts

Arabic manuscripts documenting the history of Kano:

- Tarikh Arbab Hadha al-balad al-Musamma Kano (The Kano Chronicle) (18th century)
- Asl al-Wangariyin (The Wangara Chronicle) (1650)
- Taqyid al-Akbar (The Jihad Chronicle) (1863)
- Al Eelan fi Tarikh Kano (1933)
- Wakar Bagauda (The Song of Bagauda) (oral narrative, written in Hausa Ajami script)

Published in 19th-20th centuries

- Josiah Conder (1830), "Kano", The Modern Traveller, London: J.Duncan
- H. R. Palmer, ed. (1908), "The Kano Chronicle", Journal of the Royal Anthropological Institute of Great Britain and Ireland, vol. 38 – via Internet Archive; via Google Books
- B. A. Trevallion (1967). Metropolitan Kano: report on the twenty year development plan 1963-1983. Pergamon Press. OCLC 514199.
- Paul M. Lubeck (2013) [1977]. "Contrasts and Continuity in a Dependent City: Kano, Nigeria". In J. Abu-Lughod and R. Hay (ed.). Third World Urbanization. Routledge. p. 281+. ISBN 978-1-135-68640-6.
- Economic Crisis, Structural Adjustment and the Coping Strategies of Manufacturers in Kano, Nigeria, Geneva: United Nations Research Institute for Social Development, 1996 – via International Relations and Security Network
- Noelle Watson, ed. (1996). "Kano". International Dictionary of Historic Places: Middle East and Africa. UK: Routledge. pp. 396+. ISBN 1884964036.
- Alaine S. Hutson (1999). "Development of Women's Authority in the Kano Tijaniyya, 1894-1963". Africa Today. 46 (3/4): 43–64. doi:10.1353/at.2003.0093. JSTOR 4187284.
- John Paxton, ed. (1999). "Kano, Nigeria". Penguin Encyclopedia of Places (3rd ed.). Penguin. ISBN 9780140512755.

Published in 21st century

- Paul Tiyambe Zeleza; Dickson Eyoh, eds. (2003). "Kano, Nigeria". Encyclopedia of Twentieth-Century African History. Routledge. ISBN 0415234794.
- Rasheed Olaniyi (2004). "Yoruba Commercial Diaspora and Settlement Patterns in Pre-Colonial Kano". In Toyin Falola; et al. (eds.). Nigerian Cities. Africa World Press. p. 80+. ISBN 978-1-59221-169-2.
- Kevin Shillington, ed. (2004), "Kano", Encyclopedia of African History, London: Routledge
- C. Edmund Bosworth, ed. (2007). "Kano". Historic Cities of the Islamic World. Leiden: Koninklijke Brill. p. 272+. ISBN 978-9004153882.
- Akachi Odoemene (2008). "Contexts of Colonialism ... Two Nigerian Cities". In Bahru Zewde (ed.). Society, State, and Identity in African History. African Books Collective. p. 231+. ISBN 978-99944-50-25-1. (about Kano)
- "Kano". Grove Encyclopedia of Islamic Art & Architecture. Oxford University Press. 2009. p. 369+. ISBN 978-0-19-530991-1.
- Robert F. Stock (2012). "Urban Economies and Societies: Kano". Africa South of the Sahara: A Geographical Interpretation (3rd ed.). Guilford Press. p. 403+. ISBN 978-1-4625-0811-2.
