= Borokiri =

- Neighbourhood
- Interactive map of Borokiri
- Coordinates: 4°44′56″N 7°2′6″E
- Country: Nigeria
- State: Rivers State
- LGA: Port Harcourt
- Neighbourhood of: Port Harcourt
- Time zone: UTC+1 (WAT)
- ZIP code: 500244

Borokiri (also spelled Borikiri) is a neighbourhood of the city of Port Harcourt situated just south of Old GRA in Rivers State, Nigeria. It lies at latitude 4.749° N and longitude 7.035° E. The neighbourhood is bounded by Ahoada Street to the north, Okrika Island to the east (across Aboturu Creek), Orubiri oilfield to the south and Ship Builders Road to the west. Its land uses include residential, commercial, institutional and recreation.

== Developmental Project ==
The Niger Delta Development Commission (NDDC) in the new project commissioned in January 2025 are to construct 3.6 km (2.2 mi) Road and 3 bridges in Borokiri.The road will connect Kolabi, Abotoru, and Okpoka creeks in Porta Harcourt axis together to reduce the Traffic in the area.

== Education ==
The following is a list of schools operating within this area:

- Enitonna High School
- Government Comprehensive Secondary School
- New Covenant Secondary School
- Nigerian Navy Secondary School
- Our Lady of Fatima College
- Wisdom Child International Schools
- Divine Nursery & Primary School
- Divine International College
- Springfield Nursery & Primary School
- Sunrise School
- Lifeway Christian Center School

== Market in Borokiri ==
Boroki International Market is a commercial market located in Borokiri, Port Harcourt, Nigeria, where traders gather to conduct business and sell goods.
