= Rivers State Dental and Maxillofacial Hospital =

Hospital in Port Harcourt, Nigeria

- Interactive map of the Rivers State Dental and Maxillofacial Hospital area
- Alternative names: Dental and Maxillofacial Hospital PH

General information
- Status: Completed
- Type: Hospital
- Architectural style: International, Neomodern
- Location: Port Harcourt, Rivers State, Nigeria
- Coordinates: 4°48′20″N 7°0′33″E
- Construction started: 2009
- Completed: November 2012
- Opening: 2013 (est.)
- Cost: ₦2 billion (est.)
- Client: Rivers State government
- Owner: Rivers State government

Technical details
- Floor count: 4

Rivers State Dental and Maxillofacial Hospital (RSDMH) situated in Garrison, Port Harcourt, is a Nigerian specialist hospital opened in 2013 to provide dental, oral and maxillofacial services to the general public. The hospital is owned by the Rivers State government and is considered the first of its kind in Sub-Saharan Africa.

The hospital is one of the major health facilities in the state that is managed by the International Trauma and Care Centre (ITCC). Its building is four stories high.

== See also ==
- List of hospitals in Port Harcourt
