= Elekahia =

Region in Nigeria

Elekahia (audio) is a neighborhood in Port Harcourt, Rivers State in Nigeria. It is one of the communities found in Port Harcourt Local Government Area (Phalga). The Liberation Stadium (A multi-purpose stadium) is located in Elekahia. Elekahia is situated nearby to the villages, Oroworoko and Rumukalagbo.

There are several public schools in Elekahia. Some of these schools include Government Secondary School, Elekahia (GSS Elekahia), State Model School, Community Secondary School, among others. A Real Madrid Football Academy is located in Elekahia.

A landmark Anglican church, St. Barnabas Anglican church is located in Elekahia Road. This church also has a missionary school known as St. Barnabas schools. The following streets are found in Elekahia;

- 3 Road Avenue
- 5th Street
- Atugbo Street
- Boms Avenue
- Boms Street
- Chief A. W. Akarolo Cl
- Chief Ogbonda Street
- Circular Road
- Close 6
- Close 6B
- Close 7
- Close 8
- Echichinwo Street
- Elekahia Road
- Estate Road
- Ibe Street
- Ijolo Close
- Nath Boms
- Odum Street
- Ewha Street
- Anokwuru Street
- Ohamini street
