= Diobu, Port Harcourt =

Diobu
- Neighbourhood of Port Harcourt
- Interactive map of Diobu
- Coordinates: 4°47′24″N 6°59′36″E
- Country: Nigeria
- State: Rivers State
- LGA: Port Harcourt
- City: Port Harcourt
- Time zone: UTC+1 (WAT)
- ZIP codes: 500262, 500263, 500264

Diobu is a densely populated neighbourhood of Port Harcourt, Rivers State, located within the Port Harcourt metropolis.

== Neighbourhood ==
Diobu is significant as the childhood residence of the former Rivers State governor Chibuike Amaechi. Other notable individuals who had been raised in Diobu are singer Duncan Mighty, the Mayor of Port Harcourt Hon. Victor Ihunwo and former Reps' deputy speaker Austin Opara. The neighbourhood is also known for its huge concentration of soccer talents and has produced a number of locally and internationally known players including Finidi George, Joseph Yobo and Taribo West. On 29 March 2012, Diobu hosted the 25th Most Beautiful Girl in Nigeria zonal screening for Port Harcourt.

Although the neighbourhood ranks among most commercially vibrant places in the city, about a third of its residents live below the poverty level. According to most sources, Diobu has high rates of gang activities, kidnappings and armed robberies. In many cases, police response times are unfavorably slow, and usually receive public criticism. Security in the area never actually improved until late 2007, and just for crime eradication, former Governor Rotimi Amaechi signed legislation implementing mandatory sentencing policies.

== Geography ==
=== Location ===
Diobu consists of three main extensions, namely: Mile 1, Mile 2 and Mile 3. It is bordered by New GRA to the north, D-line to the northeast, Rivers State University to the northwest, Old GRA to the east, Kidney Island to the southeast, and Eagle Island to the southwest. The coordinates of Diobu are: 4°47'24"N, 6°59'36"E (Latitude:4.772152; Longitude:6.994514).

== Economy ==
Most of the commercial activities existing in Diobu are brought about by its numerous marketplaces. The area is home to Mile One and Mile 3 markets, the largest open-air markets of Port Harcourt, where everything from clothes, household goods to foodstuffs are sold. While there are no official statistics yet, it has been estimated that Diobu's timber markets possess "over 5000 businesses" with an employment record of "over one million workers including traders, carpenters, wood dressers and labourers, among others. Major online and print media companies such as The Tide, National Network and The Neighbourhood newspapers have long moved into the area and have head offices stationed at Mile 1.

== Education ==
=== Schools ===
- St. Andrew Primary School, Mile 1
- St. Thoma's Anglican Secondary School, Mile 2
- St. Paul's Anglican School
- Ojims Nursery and Primary school
- Randolph college
- Beryl Nursery and Primary Education Center, Mile 3
- Philips Academy, 66 Nanka, Mile 1
- Port Harcourt Science School, 32 Ikwerre Road, Mile 1
- Trinity College of Business Studies
- Acumen Secondary school
- War Against Indiscipline Living Stone Foundation School

== Notable people ==
Notable current and former residents of Diobu:

- Chibuike Amaechi
- Duncan Mighty
- Austin Opara
- Finidi George
- Taribo West
- Joseph Yobo
