= Kelsey Harrison Hospital =

Coordinates: 4°47′22″N 6°59′34″E

- International Trauma and Care Centre

Geography
- Location: 11 Emenike Street, Diobu, Port Harcourt, Rivers State, Nigeria

Organisation
- Type: Specialist

Services
- Emergency department: Yes
- Beds: 150

Helipads
- Helipad: No

Links
- Other links: List of hospitals in Port Harcourt

Kelsey Harrison Hospital is a State owned hospital in Port Harcourt, the capital city of Rivers State. It was originally called New Niger Hospital and retained that name until 2009 when it was revamped and renamed after Kelsey Harrison, an internationally renowned professor of Obstetrics and Gynaecology. The facility officially opened to public in January 2013.

Headquartered at Emenike Street, Diobu, Kelsey Harrison hospital offers a broad range of medical, maternity, accident and emergency, paediatrics, diagnostic imaging, neonatal care as well as the usual general surgery services to its users. At present, the hospital has about 150 beds for patients and is managed by International Trauma and Care Centre (ITCC).

On 7 March 2013, Kelsey Harrison Hospital recorded its first successful delivery since undergoing a major upgrade. It was a 3.4kg infant girl named Judith Obilor.

== See also ==
- List of hospitals in Port Harcourt
