= New GRA, Port Harcourt =

New GRA
- Neighbourhood
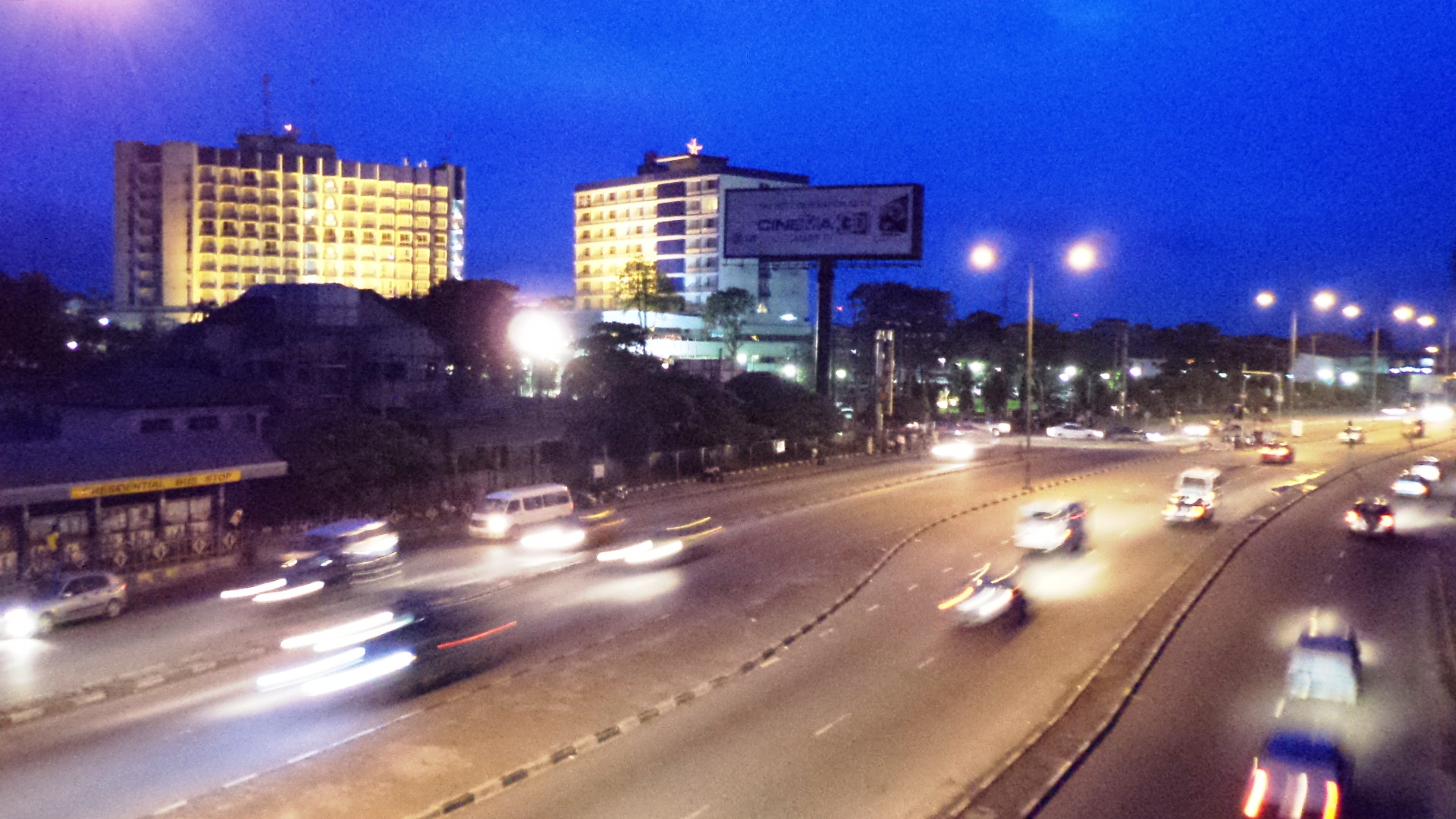
- New GRA, Port Harcourt
- Interactive map of New GRA
- Coordinates: 4°49′16″N 7°0′4″E
- Country: Nigeria
- State: Rivers State
- LGA: City of Port Harcourt
- Neighbourhood of: Port Harcourt
- Time zone: UTC+1 (WAT)
- Zip Code: 500271

The New Government Reserved Area (New GRA) is an upper middle class mixed-use neighbourhood of Port Harcourt, the capital and largest city in Rivers State.

== Geography ==
New GRA is bordered by D-line and Diobu to the south, Rumueme to the west, Rumuola to the north, and Elekahia to the east. It is located about 5.6 km (3.5 miles) southwest of Port Harcourt's Shell RA. The geographical coordinates of the neighbourhood are: 4°49'16"N, 7°0'4"E (Latitude:4.821332; Longitude:7.003355).

== Overview ==
New GRA is known to be a nightlife friendly neighbourhood and hosts the largest concentration of bars and nightclubs in Port Harcourt. It is a favorite hangout for most visitors and tends to be frequented by high-end prostitutes at night. New GRA is split up into phases 1, 2, 3, 4 and 5. The neighbourhood, along with its numerous nightspots possesses many assets including a large range of restaurants, fast food establishments and popular hotels.

== Education ==
=== Private schools ===
- Greenoak International School
- Norwegian International School

== See also ==
- Old GRA, Port Harcourt
