= The Tide (Nigeria) =

Nigeria daily newspaper

- Type: Daily newspaper
- Format: Tabloid
- Owner: State media
- Publisher: Rivers State Newspaper Corporation
- Founded: 1971
- Language: English
- Headquarters: 4 Ikwerre Road; Port Harcourt, Rivers State 500211, Nigeria
- Circulation: 800,000
- Website: www.thetidenewsonline.com

The Tide is a Nigerian daily newspaper. It is the most widely circulated newspaper published in Port Harcourt, Rivers State and one of Nigeria's major newspapers. Owned and funded by the state, The Tide began printing operations on 1 December 1971 and has a digital version.

== Fire ==
On 20 July 2012, a fire broke out in The Tide's main building, damaging significant portions of the establishment, including the General Manager's office, Credit Control Unit, Administration General office and Board Room. Although no injuries or deaths were reported, much of the company's equipment and staff documents were destroyed. According to a statement from the General Manager Mr. Celestine Ogolo, the fire started at around 2.00a.m and quickly took over the highest floor of the building where his office was stationed. Temporary workspaces were later provided to staff whose offices were affected by the fire.

== See also ==
- List of newspapers in Nigeria
