= University of Port Harcourt Teaching Hospital =

Geography
- Location: East West Road, Port Harcourt, Rivers State, Nigeria
- Coordinates: 4°53′58″N 6°55′43″E

Organisation
- Type: Research, Teaching, Tertiary
- Affiliated university: University of Port Harcourt

Services
- Emergency department: Yes
- Beds: 782

History
- Founded: 1980

Links
- Website: www.upthng.com
- Lists: Hospitals in Nigeria
- Other links: Hospitals in Port Harcourt

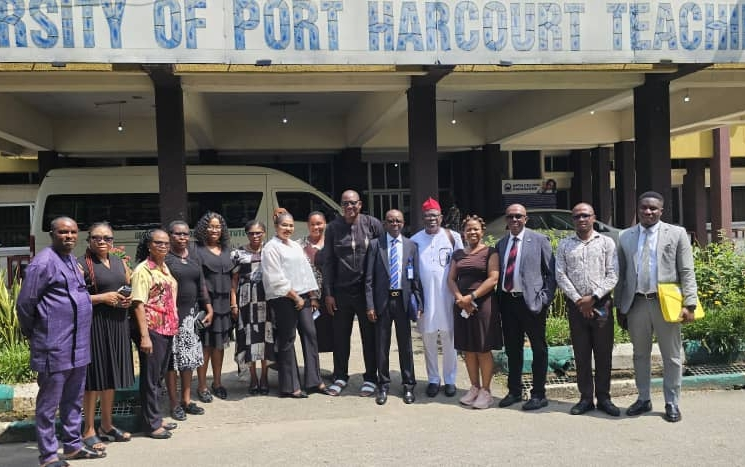
A picture of the NUC Team and the University of Port Harcourt Team at the University of Port Harcourt Teaching Hospital

University of Port Harcourt Teaching Hospital was established in April 1980 and was officially commissioned by the federal government in 1985, it is a major tertiary-care teaching and research facility in Rivers State. It is as a result of the desire of the Federal Government to provide excellent medical services, manpower training, and research in all the geopolitical zones of the country.

The mandate of the Hospital was derived from Decree 10 of 1985, University Teaching Hospitals (reconstitution of Board etc.) Decree.

The current chief medical director is Professor Henry Arinze Anthony Ugboma.

When it started out, there were 60 beds mainly in use. After relocating to its permanent site in 2006, the hospital's capacity was expanded to 500 beds and more.

University of Port Harcourt Teaching Hospital is managed through a three-tier managerial system consisting - the Board of Management, Hospital Management Committee (HMC) and the Departments. Nearly 200,000 patients are seen annually in both outpatient and inpatient settings, as well as over 3000 surgical operations a year. Average bed occupancy rate in 12 months has risen above 80%. Besides offering medical services, the hospital tends to provide clinical education and training to students, nurses, and other healthcare professionals. Over the years, many research activities and results from its organized units have appeared on several major national and international medical and scientific journals.

== Board of Management ==
- H.E Mahktar Ahned Anka (chairman)
- Dr. Noah Andrew
- Olori Oladunni Sijuwade
- Adm. Ogbor Sylvanus Fueseme
- Hon. Maina Mahammed Tar

== Departments ==
- Accident and Emergency
- Accounts
- Administration
- Anaethesiology
- Catering
- Central Sterilisation Service Department (CSSD)
- Communication
- Community Medicine
- Computer Science
- Dentistry
- Dialysis
- Ear, Nose and Throat
- General Out Patient Department
- Intensive Care Unite
- Internal Medicine
- Laundry
- Maintenance
- Medical Illustration Unit
- Medical Laboratory Services (Chemical Pathology, Haematology and Blood Bank, Medical Microbiology and Parasitology, Anatomical Pathology)
- Medical Records
- Medical Social Welfare
- Neuropsychiatry
- Nuclear Medicine
- Nurse Practice Development Unit
- Obstetrics and Gynecology
- Ophthalmology
- Oral Maxillo Facial
- Orthopaedic Department
- Paediatric Services
- Pharmacy
- Physiotherapy
- Radiology
- Stores
- Surgical Department
- Works and Services
- General house

== See also ==
- List of hospitals in Port Harcourt
- List of university hospitals
