= Port Harcourt =

City in Rivers State, Nigeria

Port Harcourt: REBISI / Pi-ta-kwa (Nigerian Pidgin)
- Metropolis
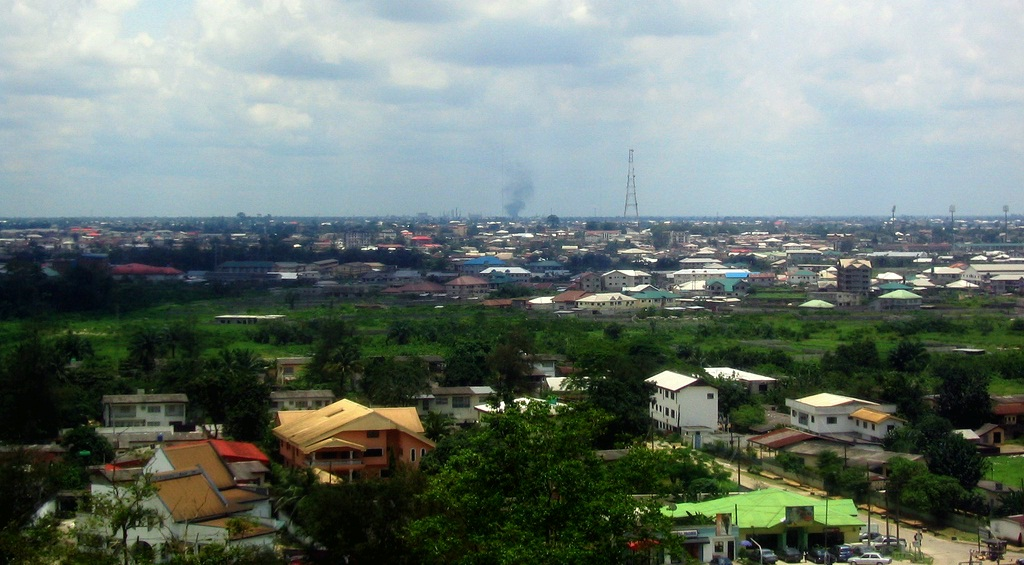
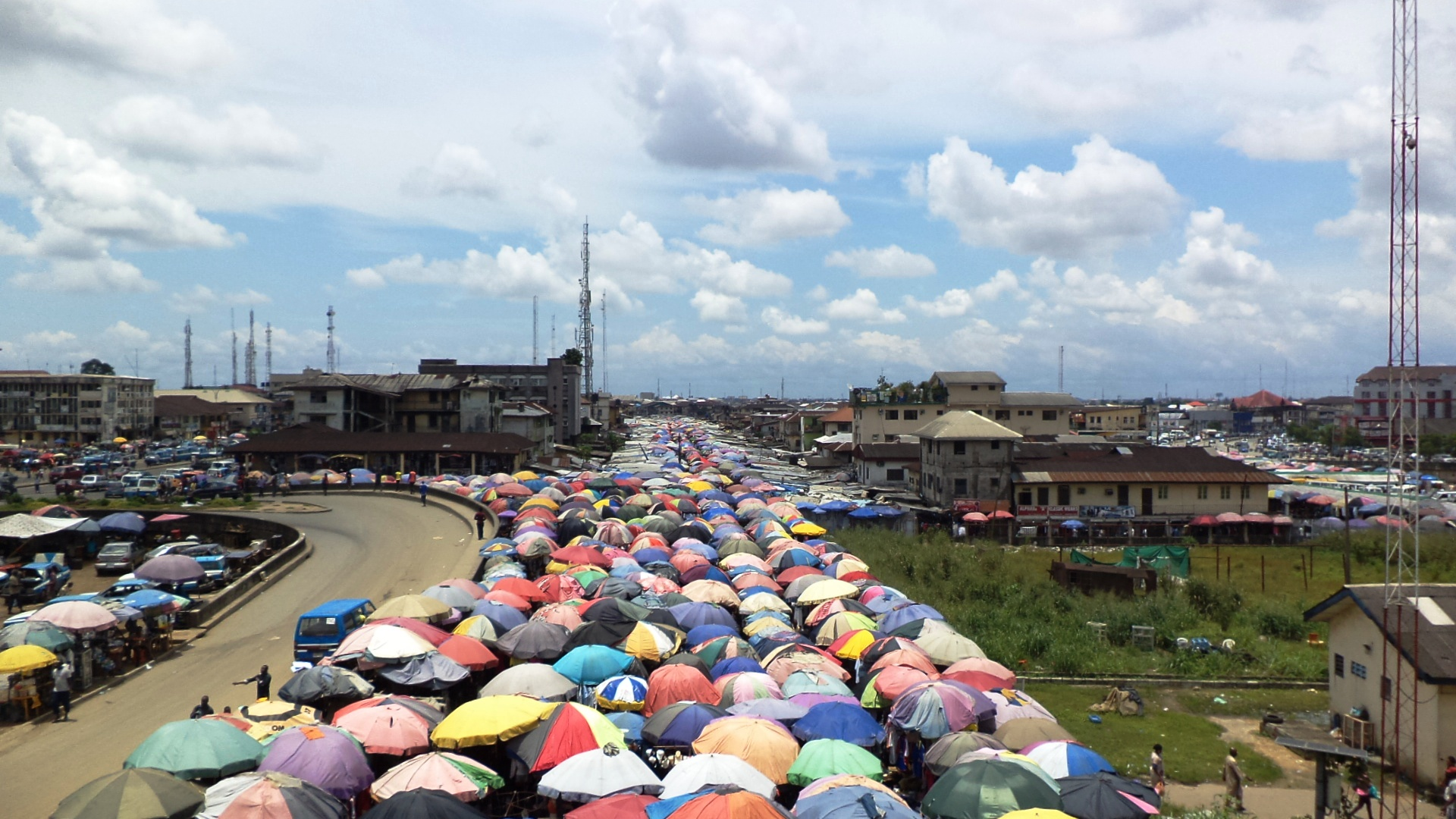
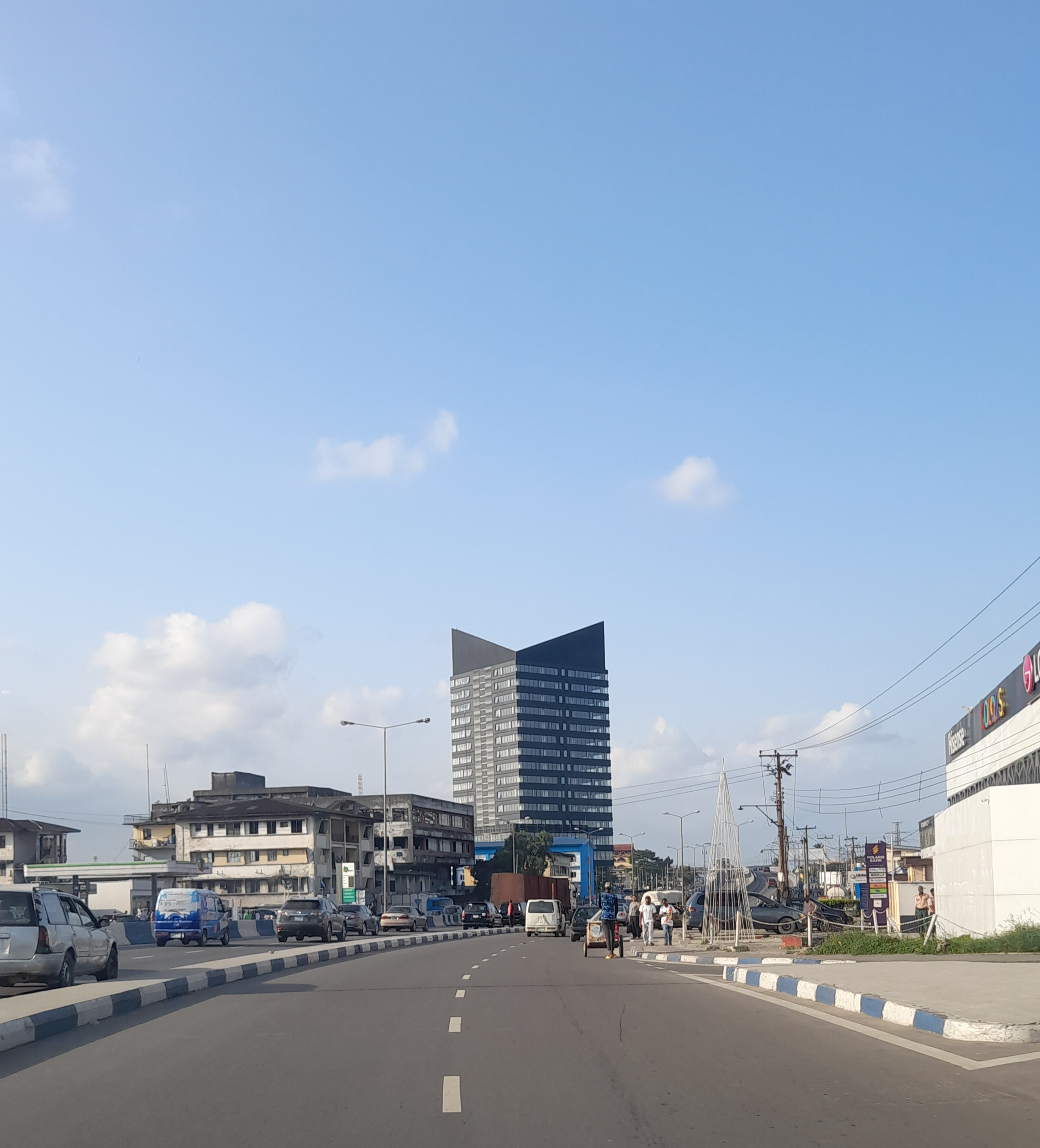
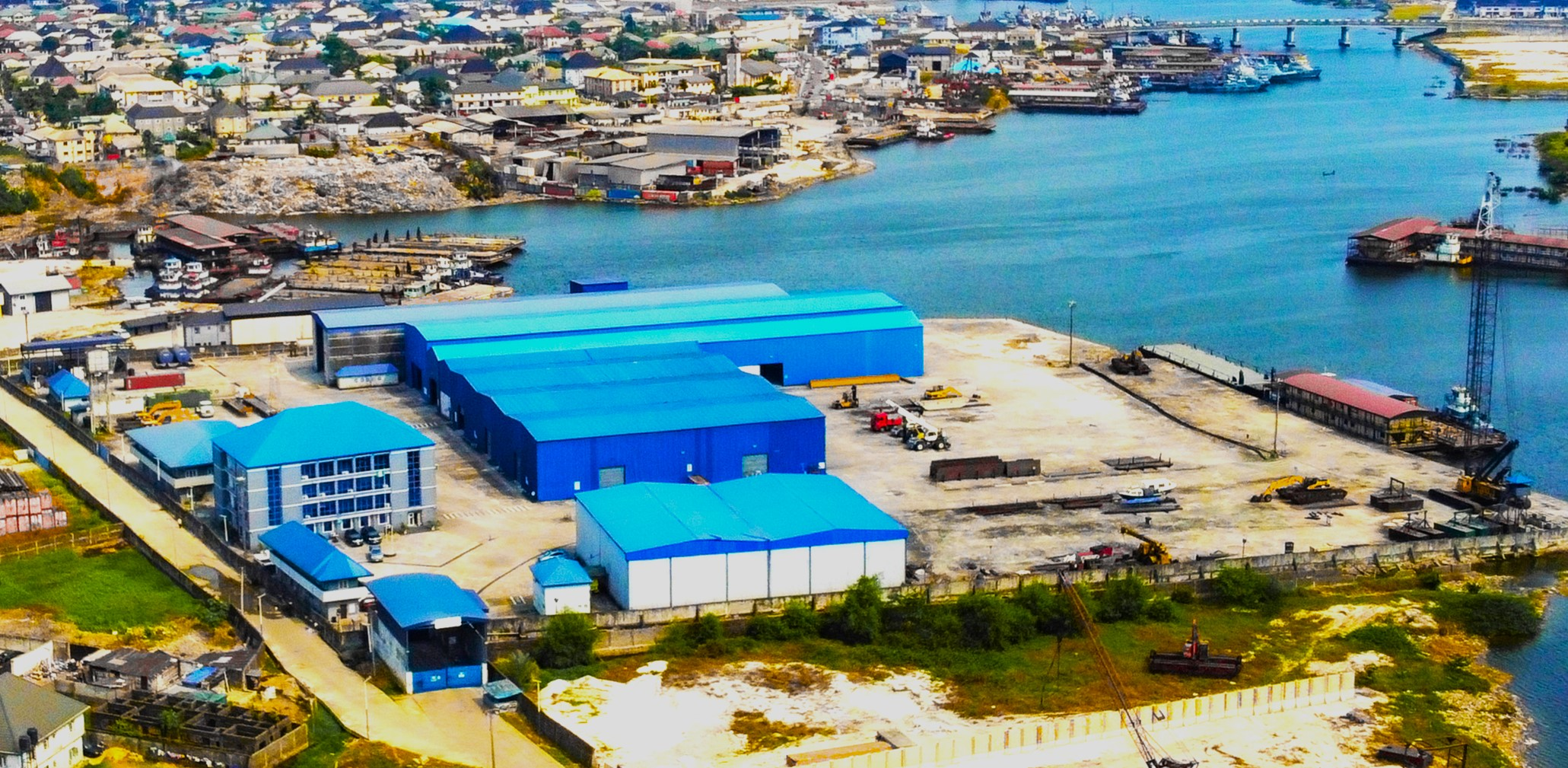
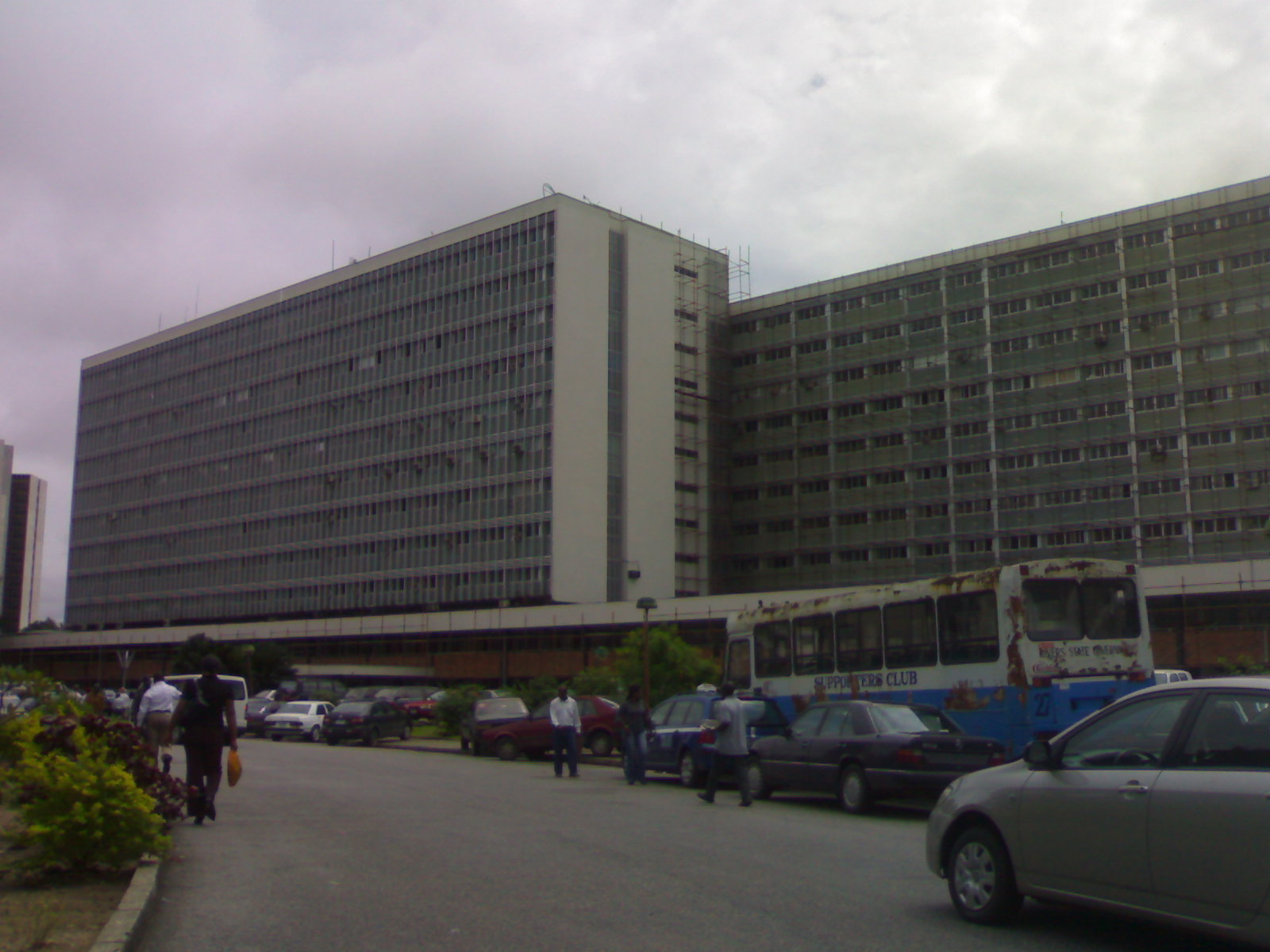
- Port Harcourt Skyline Mile One Market Port Harcourt Tower Trans Amadi State Secretariat Building

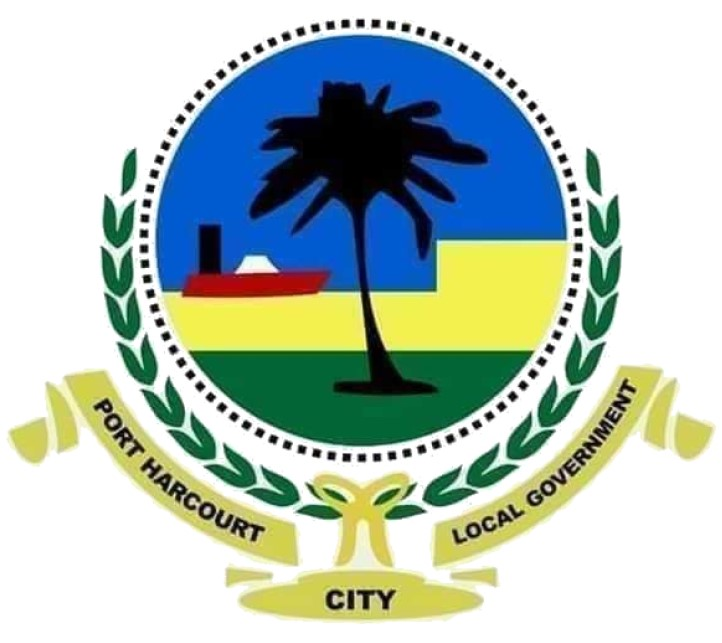
- Seal
- Nicknames: PH-City, P.H. and Garden City
- Location within Nigeria Location within Africa
- Coordinates: 4°49′27″N 7°2′1″E
- Country: Nigeria
- State: Rivers
- LGA(s): Port Harcourt; Obio-Akpor
- Founded: 1912
- Incorporation: 1913
- Named for: Lewis Vernon Harcourt

Government
  - Type: Mayor–Council
  - Body: Port Harcourt City Council
  - Mayor: Ezebunwo Ichemati

Area
  - Metropolis: 369 km^{2} (142 sq mi)
  - Land: 360 km^{2} (140 sq mi)
  - Water: 9 km^{2} (3.5 sq mi)
  - Urban: 158 km^{2} (61 sq mi)
  - Metro: 1,900 km^{2} (730 sq mi)

Population (2006 census)
  - Metropolis: 1,005,904
  - Estimate (2019): 1,148,665
  - Rank: 5th
  - Density: 2,800/km^{2} (7,200/sq mi)
  - Urban: 1,865,000
  - Urban density: 11,800/km^{2} (30,600/sq mi)
  - Metro: 3,636,000
  - Metro density: 1,900/km^{2} (5,000/sq mi)
- Demonym: Portians

GDP (PPP, constant 2015 values)
  - Year: 2023
  - Total: $34.4 billion
  - Per capita: $9,900
- Time zone: UTC+1 (WAT)
- Postcode: 500
- Area code: 02084
- Climate: Am

Port Harcourt (Nigerian Pidgin: Po-ta-kot or Pi-ta-kwa, is a port city, capital and largest city of Rivers State in Nigeria. It is the fourth most populous city in Nigeria after Lagos, Kano and Ibadan. It lies along the Bonny River and is located in the oil rich Niger Delta region. As of 2025, Port Harcourt's urban population is approximately 3,800,000. The population of the metropolitan area of Port Harcourt is almost twice its urban area population with a 2015 United Nations estimate of 2,344,000. In 1950, the population of Port Harcourt was 59,752. Port Harcourt has grown by 150,844 since 2015, which represents a 4.99% annual change.

The colonial administration of Nigeria created the port to export coal from the collieries of Enugu located 243 kilometres (151 mi) north of Port Harcourt, to which it was linked by a railway called the Eastern Line, also built by the British.

Port Harcourt's economy turned to petroleum when the first shipment of Nigerian crude oil was exported through the city in 1958. Through the benefits of the Nigerian petroleum industry, Port Harcourt was further developed, with aspects of modernization such as overpasses, city blocks, and taller and more substantial buildings. Oil firms that currently have offices in the city include Shell and Chevron with Agip Company.

The current mayor is Ezebunwo Ichemati.

== Etymology ==
The port was built in 1912, but not given a name until August 1913, when the then Governor of Nigeria, Sir Frederick Lugard named it "Port Harcourt" in honor of Lewis Harcourt, 1st Viscount Harcourt, then the Secretary of State for the Colonies. The native Ikwerre name for the area is Rebisi (the traditional kingdom).

== History ==
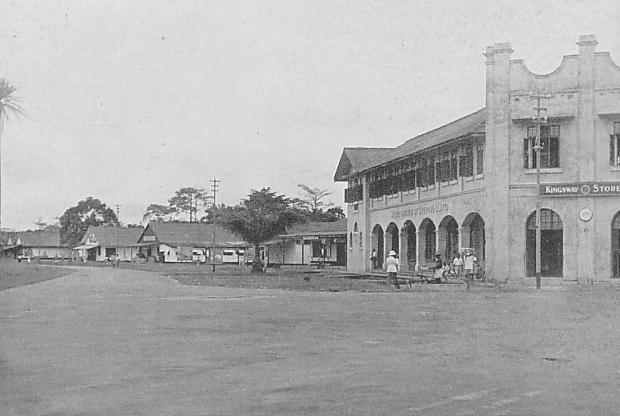
Port Harcourt in the 1930s

Port Harcourt was founded in 1912 by Frederick Lugard, governor of both the Northern Nigeria Protectorate and the Southern Nigeria Protectorate. Its purpose was to export the coal that geologist Albert Ernest Kitson had discovered in Enugu in 1909. The colonial government caused the people of Diobu to cede their land, and in 1912 the building of a port-town was started. Other villages that were later absorbed into the city included Oroworukwo, Oromeruezimgbu, Nkpogu, and Rumuomasi; In the creeks to the south of the original port were the fishing camps and grounds of the Rebisi-ikwerre People-Ikwerre group.

During the First World War, Port Harcourt was used as a point for military operations against the Central Powers in German Kamerun. After the discovery of crude oil in Oloibiri in 1956, Port Harcourt exported the first shipload from Nigeria in 1958. Port Harcourt became the centre of the Nigerian oil economy and it subsequently reaped benefits of its associations with the petroleum industry by undergoing modernization and urbanization. Port Harcourt's growth is further due to its position as the commercial centre and foremost industrial city of the former Eastern Region; its position in the Niger Delta; and its importance as the centre of social and economic life in Rivers State. After the Republic of Biafra seceded from Nigeria in 1967 Port Harcourt fell to Nigerian forces on 19 May 1968. From an area of 15.54 km^{2} (6.00 sq mi) in 1914, Port Harcourt grew uncontrolled to an area of 360 km^{2} (140 sq mi) in the 1980s.

== Geography ==
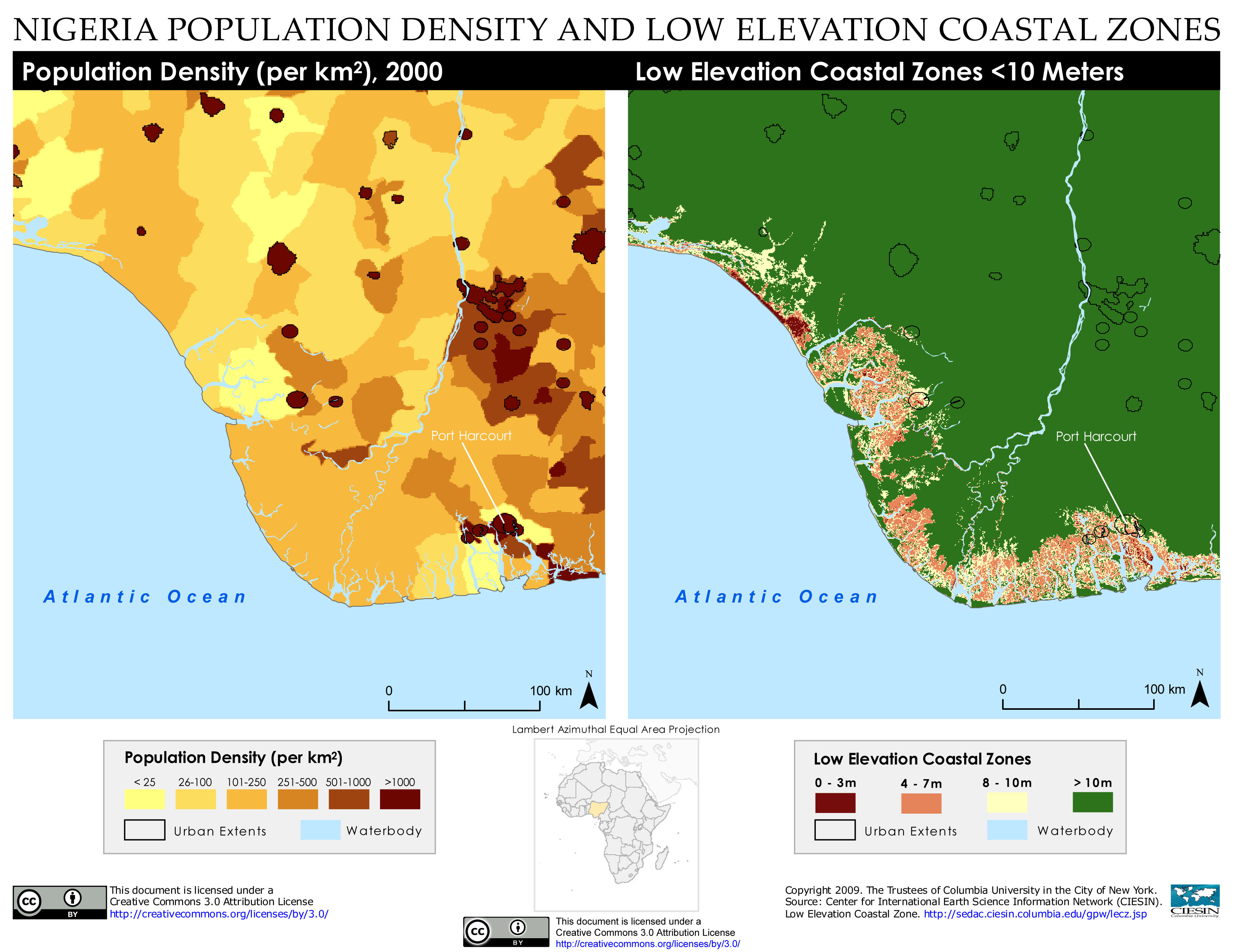
Population density and low elevation coastal zones in the Port Harcourt region. Port Harcourt is especially vulnerable to sea level rise.

The main city of Port Harcourt is the Port Harcourt City in the Port Harcourt local government area, consisting of the former European quarters now called Old GRA and New Layout areas. The urban area (Port Harcourt metropolis), on the other hand, is made up of the local government area itself and parts of Obio-Akpor and Eleme accordingly. Port Harcourt, which is the current capital of Rivers State, is highly congested as it is the only major city of the state. In 2009, a law was passed by the Rivers State House of Assembly and Governor Amaechi's administration to spread development to the surrounding communities as part of the effort to decongest the Port Harcourt metropolis. The Greater Port Harcourt region, spans eight local government areas that include Port Harcourt, Okrika, Obio-Akpor, Ikwerre, Oyigbo, Ogu–Bolo, Etche and Eleme. Its total population was estimated at 2,000,000 as of 2009, making it one of the largest metropolitan areas in Nigeria. But that number has greatly increased according to recent studies.

=== Climate ===
Port Harcourt features a tropical monsoon climate (Köppen: Am) with lengthy and heavy rainy seasons and very short dry seasons. Only the months of December to February truly qualify as dry season months in the city. The harmattan, which climatically influences many cities in West Africa, is less pronounced in Port Harcourt. Port Harcourt's heaviest precipitation occurs during September with an average of 367 millimetres or 14.45 inches of rain. December on average is the driest month of the year, with an average rainfall of 20 millimetres or 0.79 inches. Temperatures throughout the year in the city are relatively constant, showing little variation throughout the course of the year. Average temperatures are typically between 25 and 28 °C (77.0 and 82.4 °F) in the city.

The yearly temperature in Port Harcourt is 26.55 °C (79.79 °F) and it is -2.91% lower than Nigeria's averages. Rivers typically receive about 330.36 millimetres (13.01 inches) of precipitation and has 304.91 rainy days (83.54% of the time) annually.

The windest month is August.

The period of January, February, March, April, May, November, December is widely regarded as the peak season for visitation.

Climate data for Port Harcourt (1991–2020)
Month	Jan	Feb	Mar	Apr	May	Jun	Jul	Aug	Sep	Oct	Nov	Dec	Year
Record high °C (°F)	37 (99)	38.5 (101.3)	38 (100)	36.2 (97.2)	37.2 (99.0)	34 (93)	32.5 (90.5)	33 (91)	33.1 (91.6)	39 (102)	35.2 (95.4)	37.2 (99.0)	39.0 (102.2)
Mean daily maximum °C (°F)	33.1 (91.6)	34.0 (93.2)	33.2 (91.8)	32.6 (90.7)	31.9 (89.4)	30.2 (86.4)	29.0 (84.2)	28.9 (84.0)	29.6 (85.3)	30.5 (86.9)	31.8 (89.2)	32.7 (90.9)	31.5 (88.7)
Daily mean °C (°F)	27.2 (81.0)	28.4 (83.1)	28.4 (83.1)	28.0 (82.4)	27.6 (81.7)	26.6 (79.9)	25.9 (78.6)	25.8 (78.4)	26.2 (79.2)	26.7 (80.1)	27.3 (81.1)	27.2 (81.0)	27.1 (80.8)
Mean daily minimum °C (°F)	21.3 (70.3)	22.8 (73.0)	23.5 (74.3)	23.5 (74.3)	23.3 (73.9)	22.9 (73.2)	22.7 (72.9)	22.8 (73.0)	22.9 (73.2)	22.8 (73.0)	22.9 (73.2)	21.8 (71.2)	22.8 (73.0)
Record low °C (°F)	11.6 (52.9)	16.7 (62.1)	16 (61)	15.9 (60.6)	16.4 (61.5)	19 (66)	19 (66)	19.6 (67.3)	12.5 (54.5)	19.5 (67.1)	18 (64)	15 (59)	11.6 (52.9)
Average precipitation mm (inches)	22.1 (0.87)	59.7 (2.35)	114.6 (4.51)	159.2 (6.27)	260.9 (10.27)	310.1 (12.21)	357.9 (14.09)	290.2 (11.43)	354.0 (13.94)	251.7 (9.91)	87.2 (3.43)	19.0 (0.75)	2,286.5 (90.02)
Average precipitation days (≥ 1.0 mm)	1.8	3.6	8.0	10.0	14.2	16.6	19.2	19.2	19.0	16.0	6.9	1.4	135.9
Average relative humidity (%)	78.1	81.7	87.3	89.1	90.0	91.0	91.1	90.7	91.4	90.9	88.1	80.7	87.5
Mean monthly sunshine hours	142.6	123.2	114.7	132.0	139.5	102.0	77.5	74.4	78.0	102.3	132.0	148.8	1,367
Source: NOAA (sunshine 1961–1990)

== Environmental concerns ==
=== Air pollution ===
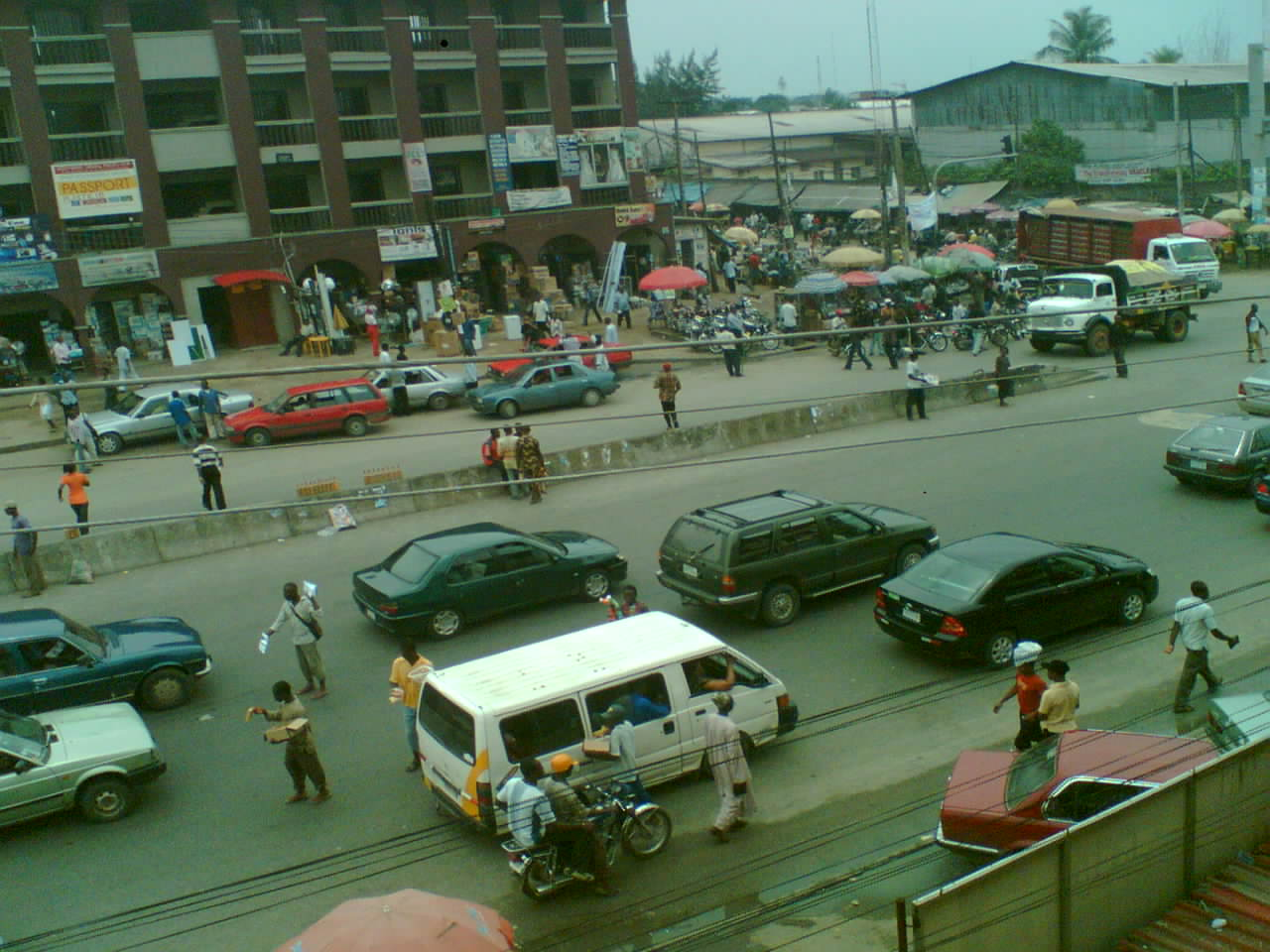
Traffic in the Port Harcourt City Centre

Residents of the city have been experiencing particle (soot) pollution since the last quarter of 2016. Residents state their clothes and everything outside is covered with a layer of black soot. Official PM2.5 information from the state's environmental commissioner, Roseline Konya, states a high reading of 270 micrograms per cubic meter for air pollution in the city from a 2016 sampling. According to the U.S. Environmental Protection Agency's (EPA) index air quality index (AQI), a reading of 0 – 50 is good, readings between 200 – 300 which Port Harcourt falls under is considered unhealthy for everyone and E.P.A advises residents of such areas to avoid heavy and prolonged exertion, and move activities indoors. "For a 15-month period ending in June [2018] ... air quality was in the unhealthy range on 240 days, with 85 days ranking very unhealthy, and 13 days as hazardous."

The increased deterioration of ambient air quality led to a state protest in February 2017. There were experiences of black soot settling in nostrils, on cars, floors, roofs, windows, bathtubs, bathrooms, kitchen sinks and household furniture surfaces resulting in frequent cleaning of affected surfaces and places. potable, domestic and rainwater were equally affected. Abuloma, Iwofe, Rupokwu, Okrika, and Woji were mostly affected with other areas such as Rumuigbo, Eleme, and Oyigbo Local Government Councils, as well as Ogoni.

The covering of the haze of soot in most parts of the city has resulted in visibility impairment by PM2.5, soil, and water deposition, and disruption in ecosystem diversity. This also made the city dwellers spend more time indoors than outdoors. Residents in cities such as Rumosi and Rumuodumanya in Obio/Akpor Council have relocated to other safe cities leading to a decline in business activities.

The Ministry of Environment took action by analysing air samples from various sites in the city and found out to be 11 times higher than WHO specifications for PM2.5 and PM10. This non-compliance was tackled by shutting down the Chinese Government Company (CGC), H&H Engineering Company, and AUC Asphalt Company located in the Aluu community, found to be the location of high volume discharge of emissions thereby contravening environmental regulations. Illegal refineries, burning of tires, gas flaring, liquefied natural gas (LNG) operations and processes, petro-chemical companies and refineries were other suspected sources of soot pollution.

== Residential areas ==
Some of Port Harcourt's more popular and well-known residential areas are known as Port Harcourt Township (or just "Town"), GRA (Government Reserved Area) phases 1–5, Elekahia, Rumuomasi, D-line, Elelenwo, Eliozu, Iboloji, Ogbunabali, Rumuola, Rumuigbo, Mgbuoba, Diobu, Woji, Amadi Flats, Umuchitta, Rumuokoro and Borikiri. The main industrial area is located in Trans Amadi, Abuloma.

== Economy ==
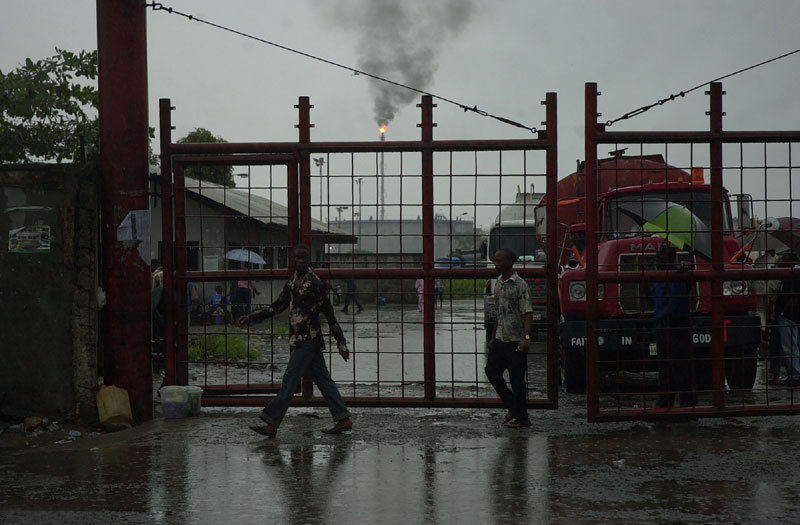
The Port Harcourt Refining Company Ltd, Alesa Eleme.

Port Harcourt is a major industrial centre as it has a large number of multinational firms as well as other industrial concerns, particularly business related to the petroleum industry. It is the chief oil-refining city in Nigeria and has two main oil refineries located at Eleme. Both refineries process around 210,000 barrels of crude oil a day, both operated by the Port Harcourt Refining Company. Rivers State is one of the wealthiest states in Nigeria in terms of gross domestic product and foreign exchange revenue from the oil industry, crude oil being its principal export earner. Microapartment architecture is common in certain parts of Port Harcourt. The 18-story Point Block of Rivers State Secretariat building is an icon of the city. It is the tallest building in the Southeast and South-South geopolitical zones combined.

== Demographics ==
=== Ethnic groups ===
Port Harcourt is primarily composed of coastal Ikwerre.

=== Religion ===
As in other cities in the country's south, the predominant religion of Port Harcourt is Christianity. Roman Catholics make up a significant portion of the Christian population. There are scores of churches, parishes and priests within the Port Harcourt Catholic diocese. The central church is the Corpus Christi Cathedral Parish in D-line. The city is also home to other Christian denominations such as Anglicans, Methodists, Baptists, Presbyterians, Jehovah's Witnesses and members of Evangelical and Pentecostal groups. A very small number of residents adhere to the Islamic faith.

== Culture ==
=== Literature ===
The Port Harcourt Book Festival, formerly known as Garden City Literary Festival remains one of the city's most important and popular events since its inception in 2008. Established by the government of Chibuike Rotimi Amaechi, the yearly gathering improves local literacy levels, promotes reading habits among denizens, and benefits exhibitors seeking a wider audience. Throughout its annual run, Port Harcourt Book Festival has hosted renowned publishers such as Heinemann, Learn Africa Plc, Africana First Publishers and EPP Books Services. The festival currently continues to draw writers, literary connoisseurs, booksellers and publishers from every walk of life to the city. In July 2012, UNESCO, IPA, IBF and IFLA named Port Harcourt the World Book Capital for the year 2014, making her the 14th city in the world to be selected as World Book Capital and the first in Black Africa.

The city also features in Looking for Transwonderland, one of the first volumes of travel writing written by a Nigerian, Noo Saro-Wiwa.

=== Nightlife ===
Aside from being the oil capital, Port Harcourt is also known for its vibrant late-night activities and entertainment scene. There are several public houses, lounges, clubs, dance bars and restaurants spread out around the city. Partyers and revellers tend to spend a chunk of their night time at New GRA, where most of the bars and high-end nightclubs are located. Uptempo and club-friendly music can be heard in nearly every corner of the city at night. There have been increases in sex-oriented businesses including strip clubs and brothels.

=== In popular culture ===
==== In music ====
Numerous musicians have come from Port Harcourt.

- Award-winning Nigerian musician Duncan Mighty also popularly known as Port Harcourt's First Son. Duncan Mighty is known for his hit song "Port Harcourt Son".
- Grammy winner Burna Boy was born and raised in Port Harcourt. He speaks of Port Harcourt in his song titled "Ph City Vibration".
- Afro singer Timaya was born and raised in Port Harcourt City. He accolades the city in his album
- Award-winning International singer Omah Lay was born and raised in Port Harcourt
- Ajebo Hustlers the duo singers were raised in Port Harcourt
- Duncan Daniels London-based artiste also grew up in Port Harcourt
- Singer and actress Muma Gee highlights the city's scenes and culture in her song "Port Harcourt Is Back".
- Reggae-fusion singer Slim Burna sang a song called "Port Harcourt Boy" from his 2013 release I'm on Fire.

==== In movies ====
- In the film Blood and Oil, which tells the tale of two British women and their unusual journey to the hinterland of the Niger Delta, the main character Alice Omuka travels to Port Harcourt, where she learns of the kidnapping of foreign oil workers.
- Port Harcourt is a location in the Blessing Uduefe-directed movie The Green Eyed. The movie also premiered in the city.
- Girls Hostel, a Nollywood movie filmed in Port Harcourt helped catapult actresses Mary Uranta and Empress Njamah into stardom.

== Education ==
=== Colleges and universities ===
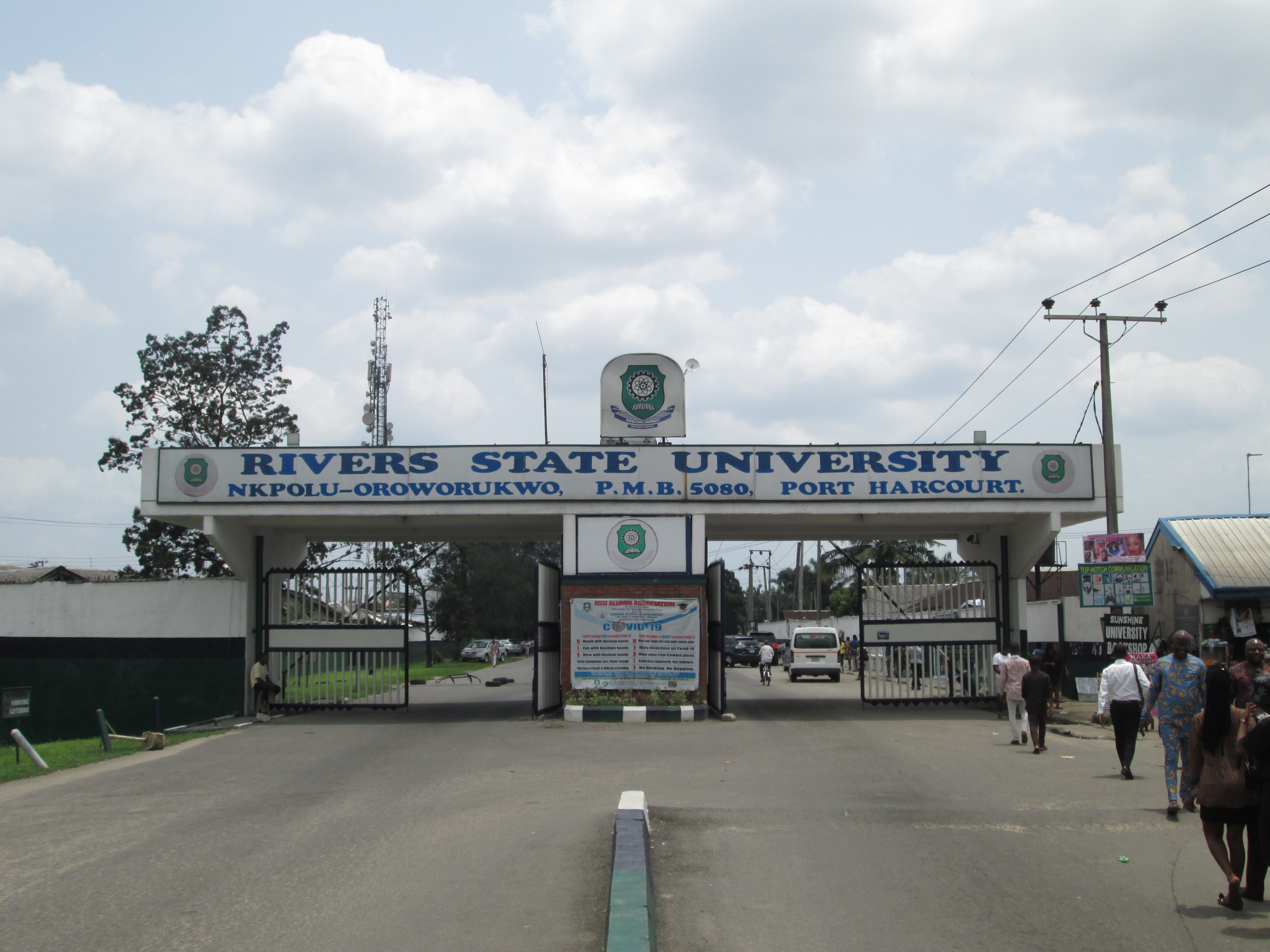
Rivers State University main gate

Several institutions of tertiary education in Port Harcourt offer a wide range of professionally accredited programmes and qualifications. Most of these institutions are publicly funded, while others are run by private entities. The University of Port Harcourt was ranked sixth in Africa and first in Nigeria by Times Higher Education in 2015. The federal government owned university has its main campus at Choba district.

Universities and colleges administered by the Government of Rivers State are also located in the city. They include Rivers State University, Kenule Beesor Saro-Wiwa Polytechnic (Former Rivers State Polytechnic, Bori), Captain Elechi Amadi Polytechnic, Ignatius Ajuru University of Education and Rivers State College of Health Science and Technology. The notable private institutions are Catholic Institute of West Africa and Eastern Polytechnic. The latter is the first and only private polytechnic established in the state.

== Media ==
Media in Port Harcourt consists largely of print, online blogs, social media and broadcast. Information is generally disseminated to the public through radio, television, newspapers, magazines and the Internet. The government owns a number of the existing communications media, although, some private media is permitted. As a regulatory authority, the Rivers State Ministry of Information and Communications is responsible for overseeing the entire broadcasting system, as well as promoting competition and ensuring the provision of qualitative services throughout the city. Since English is much more popular in the country's urban areas, media content such as publications, news, radio and television programmes are available mostly in the English language.

=== Newspapers ===
In print media, the largest-circulated daily newspaper published in Port Harcourt is The Tide. It is state-supported and has an online version. Another popular newspaper is the weekly tabloid National Network which is owned by local politician Jerry Needam. Additionally, other noteworthy papers like The Neighbourhood published by Nativity Communications Company and The Newswriter published by Writers House have begun competing for market presence and are both headquartered in the metropolis.

=== Radio ===
Radio is an important mass medium in these parts. Not only has it become a strong source of news and entertainment, it is also wide reaching and has proved a cheap means to reach a mass audience. Many of Port Harcourt's radio stations are in private hands with just a few are state owned. Radio Rivers, founded 1981 offers programs in English and various indigenous languages. Its operator is the Rivers State Broadcasting Corporation (RSBC). As of December 2013, more than 5 local FM stations some of which were privately owned by media conglomerates Silverbird Group, South Atlantic Media, Globe Broadcasting and Communications and The Multimesh Company were already commercially licensed.

=== Television ===
- Rivers State Television – Government owned TV station on UHF channel 22. Established in 1985.

== Transport ==
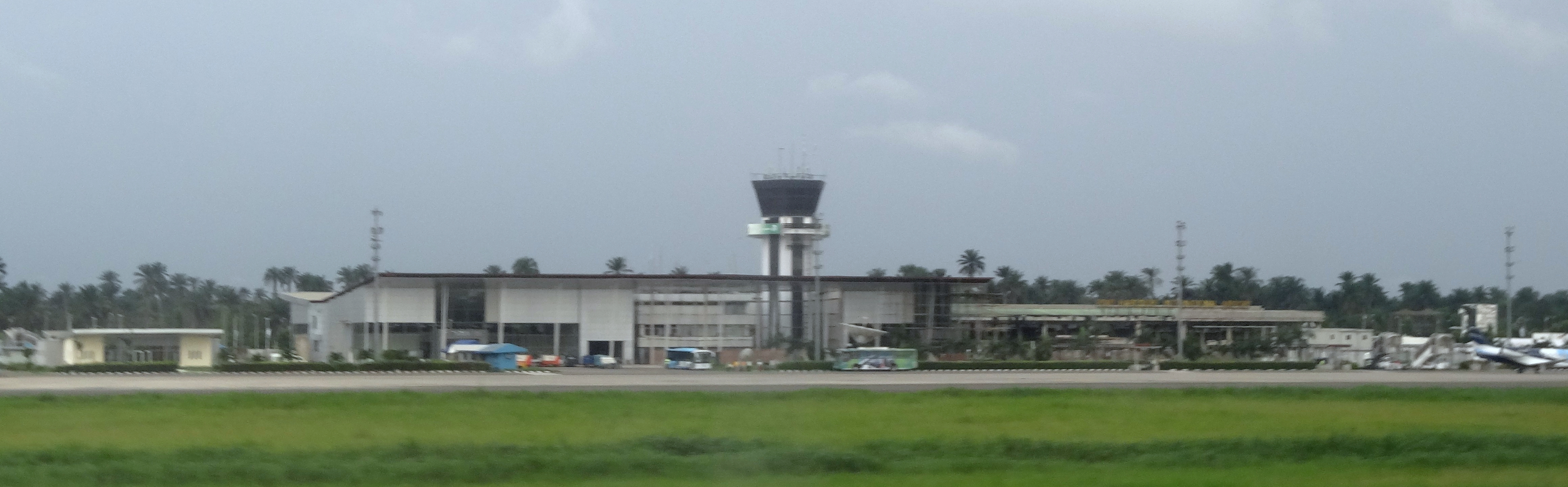
Port Harcourt International Airport

There is an international airport, Port Harcourt International Airport on the outskirts of the city, a Nigerian Air Force (NAF) base which is the location of the only other airport used by commercial airlines Aero Contractors, Caverton Helicopters and Bristow Helicopters for domestic flights, two seaports (FOT Onne, Port Harcourt Wharf).

== Sports ==
Port Harcourt hosts several major sports facilities, including the Sharks Stadium the Yakubu Gowon Stadium located in Elekahia, the Adokiye Amiesimaka Stadium situated in Omagwa, the University of Port Harcourt Stadium , and the Liberation Stadium

The city is home to one of Nigeria’s prominent football clubs, Rivers United F.C., which competes in the Nigerian Professional Football League and has represented Nigeria in continental competitions. It is also home to Rivers Angels F.C., one of the leading women’s football clubs in Nigeria.

Other notable football organizations in the city include Obio Akpor Football Club , which uses the University of Port Harcourt Stadium for training and home matches, and the Burna Boy Football Academy, which is associated with player development activities based around the Liberation Stadium.

In September 2019, then-Governor of Rivers State, Nyesom Wike announced plans to establish a football academy in partnership with Spanish club Real Madrid CF. The project, named the Real Madrid Football Academy, was later commissioned approximately 18 months afterward by the state government alongside Nigeria’s Minister of Youth and Sports Development, Sunday Dare.

== Healthcare ==
Port Harcourt is the leading hub for medical services in Rivers State. Many healthcare facilities including hospitals and research facilities are located in Port Harcourt. The city has a prominent tertiary health institution University of Port Harcourt Teaching Hospital (UPTH) is situated on East West Road.

Government hospitals are widely favoured and cater to a larger pool of patients. One of the oldest is Braithwaite Memorial Specialist Hospital. Founded in 1925, the 375-bed facility provides general and specialist medical and surgical services along with a range of diagnostic and support services. Between 2009 and 2013, the Rivers State government commissioned two additional hospitals. This includes Kelsey Harrison Hospital and the Rivers State Dental and Maxillofacial Hospital.

Some other notable hospitals in the city are Meridian Hospital and Rehoboth Specialist Hospital which are private.

== Water supply and sanitation ==
The Port Harcourt Water Supply and Sanitation Project aims to deliver sustainable water supply to the people of Port Harcourt and Obio-Akpor local government areas. The project is the first phase of the rehabilitation of the old Port Harcourt water supply system and its extension to new areas of the city. It involves the rehabilitation and upgrade of the stations in Rumuola, increasing its current capacity to 187,000 m^{3} (6,603,843 cu ft) per day.

In Rivers State, Water sector and utility reforms were initiated in 2009 and included the enactment of the Rivers State's Water and Sanitation Policy 2012 and the enactment of the Rivers State Water Sector development law #7 of 2012.

The policy and Law provided for the creation of specialized institutions for service delivery. Key agencies include the Rural Water Supply and Sanitation Agency (RWSSA), the Small Towns Water Supply and Sanitation (STWSSA), the Port Harcourt Water Corporation (PHWC), and the Rivers State Water Services Regulatory Commission.

Port Harcourt Water Corporation (PHWC) was established pursuant to the Water Sector Development Law #7 of 2012 to replace the former Rivers State Water Board and to ensure the provision of potable drinking water and wastewater treatment services. The corporation formally took off in September 2014 with the recruitment of the pioneer managing director, Kenneth Anga with a mandate to convert it to a self-sustaining public service corporation.

== Greater Port Harcourt ==
Under the leadership of former Governor Chibuike Amaechi, plans was announced for the creation of a new city to be called Greater Port-Harcourt City. The new city is to be located at the outskirt of Port Harcourt close to the Port-Harcourt International Airport. The total coverage area for the Greater Port Harcourt city development is about 1,900 km^{2} (730 sq mi) spanning eight local governments in Rivers State, including Ogu Bolo, Eleme,Ikwerre, Etche, Obio Akpor, Okrika.

The Authority (GPHCDA) was established by law in April 2009 with a mandate to facilitate the implementation of the Greater Port Harcourt master plan and build the new city. The Authority is led by an administrator, Dame Aleruchi Cookey Gam, supported by a pioneer management team comprising the Secretary to the authority and Board, Silva Opusunju, Director Finance Aaron Obelley, Director Administration (Permanent Secretary) MI Tella, Director Public Affairs Kenneth Anga, Director Legal Justice Nwobike, Director Projects Edmund Altraide, Director Development Control Sir Ngozi Worgu.

The Greater Port Harcourt city hosted several of the events at the 17th national sports festival tagged "Garden City Games".

== Gallery ==
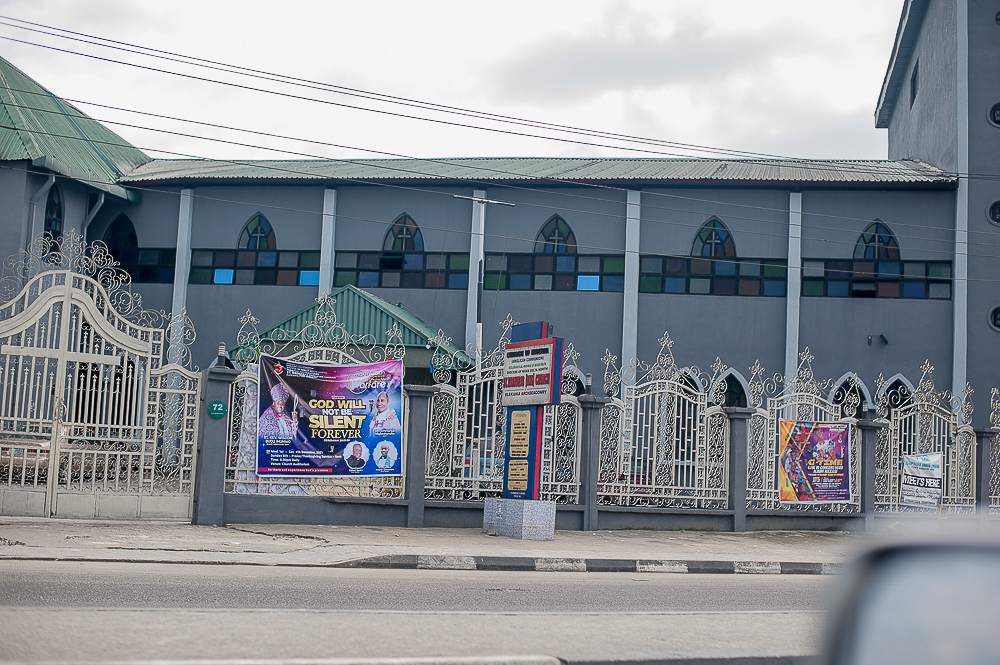

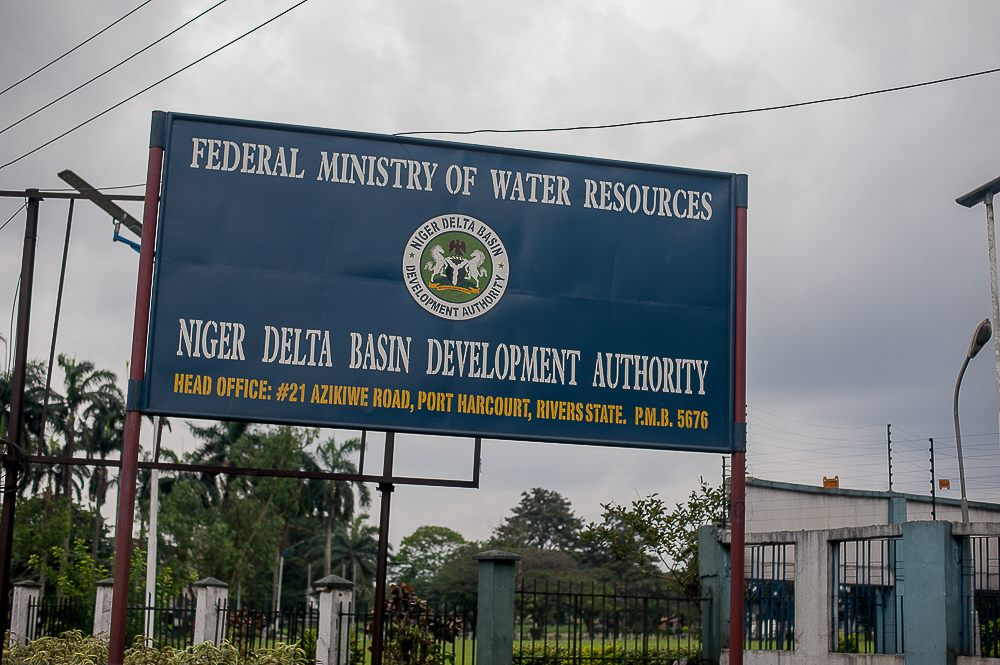

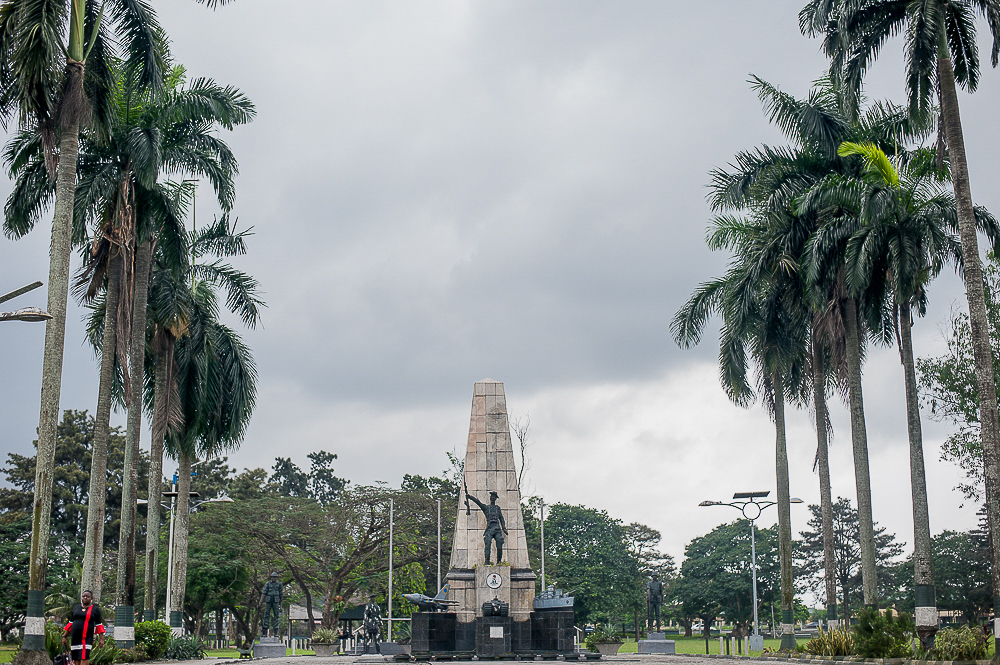

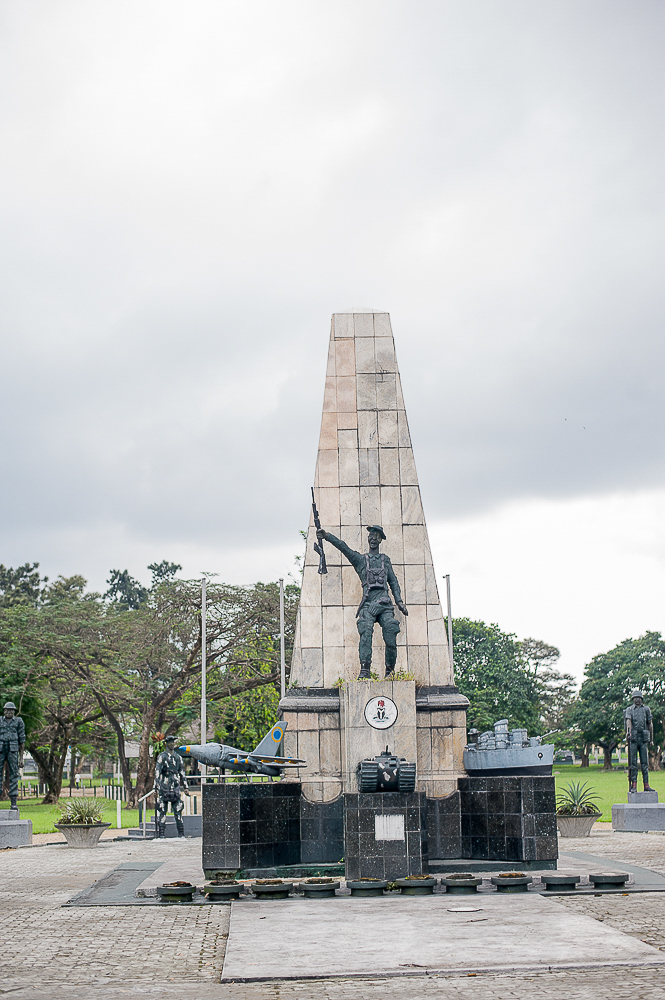

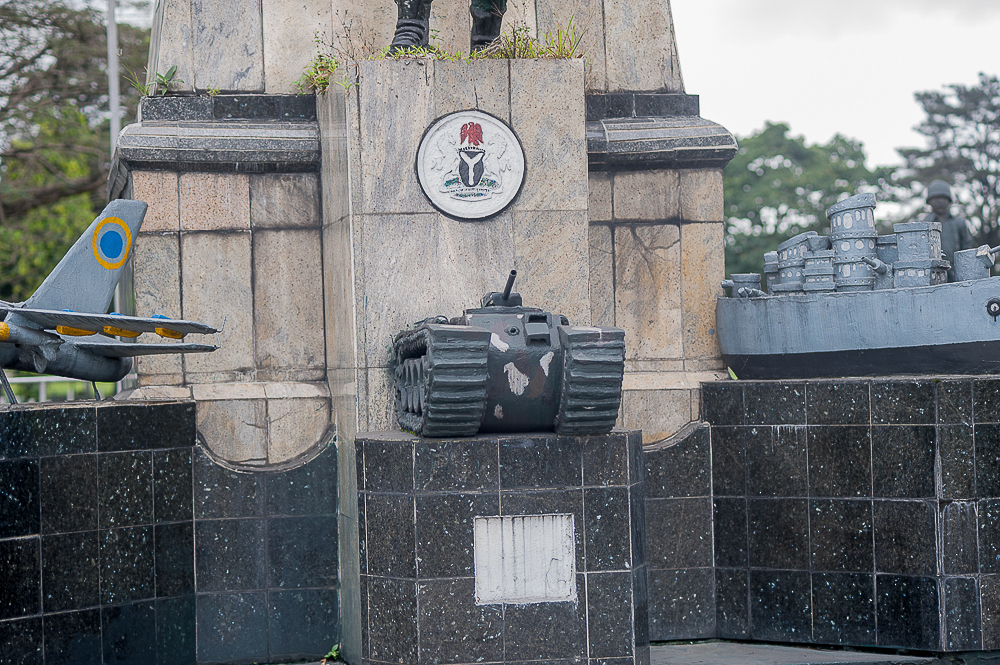

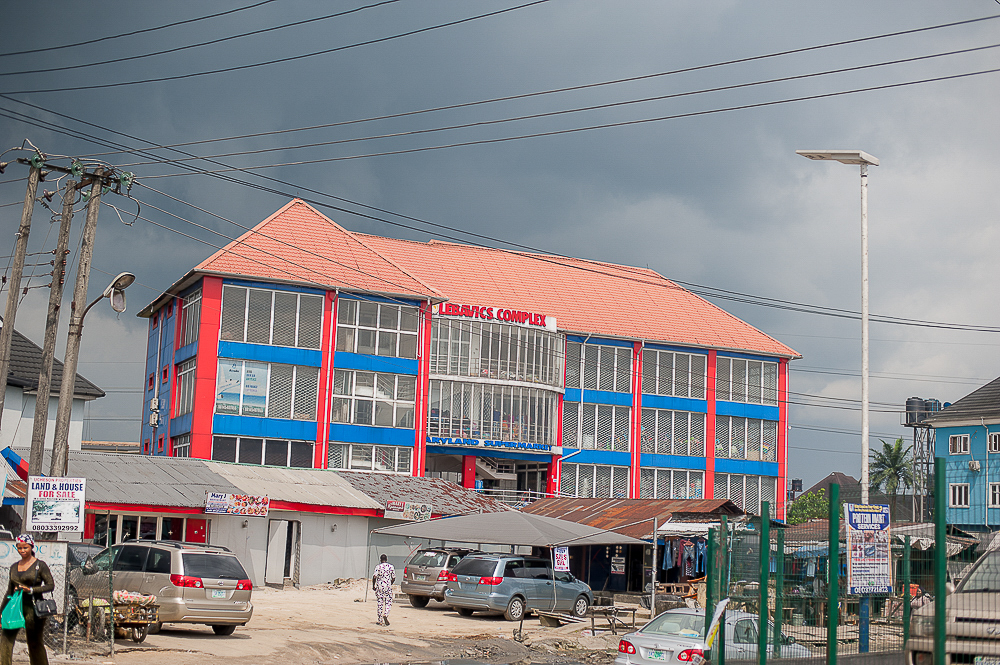

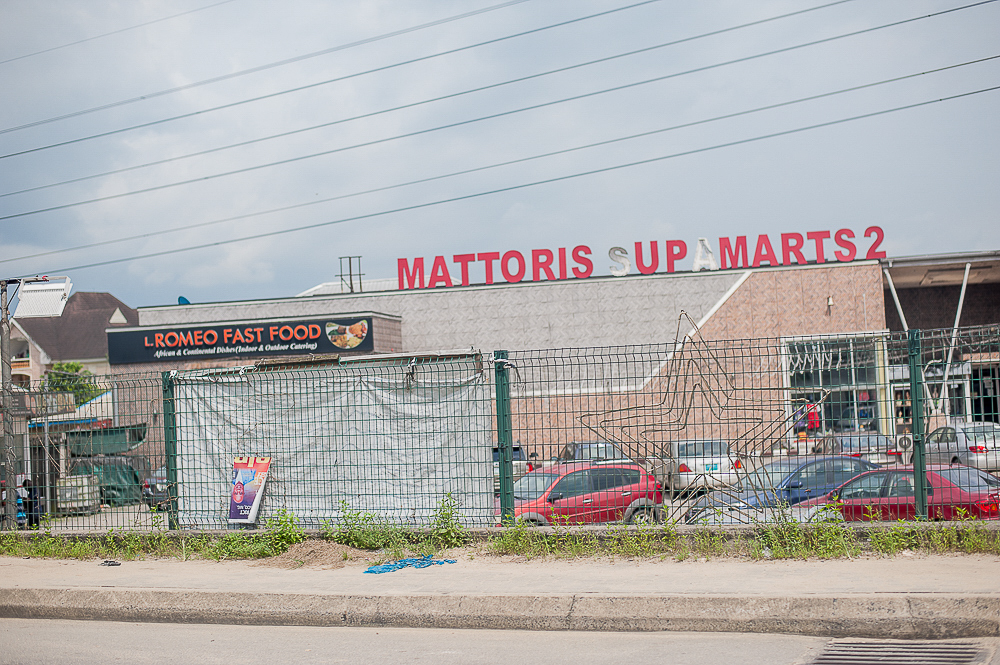

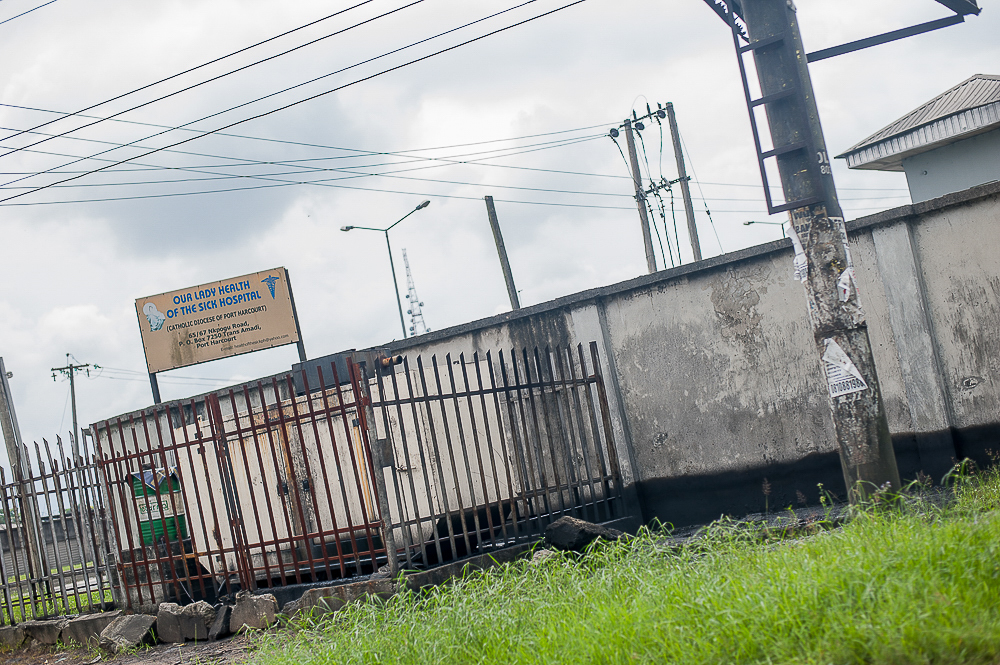

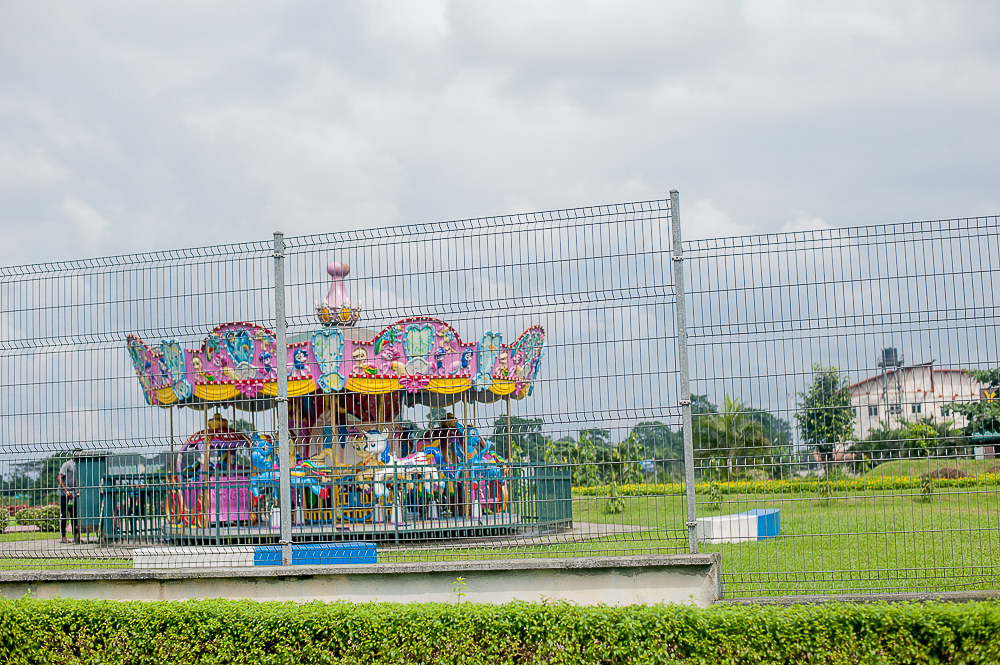

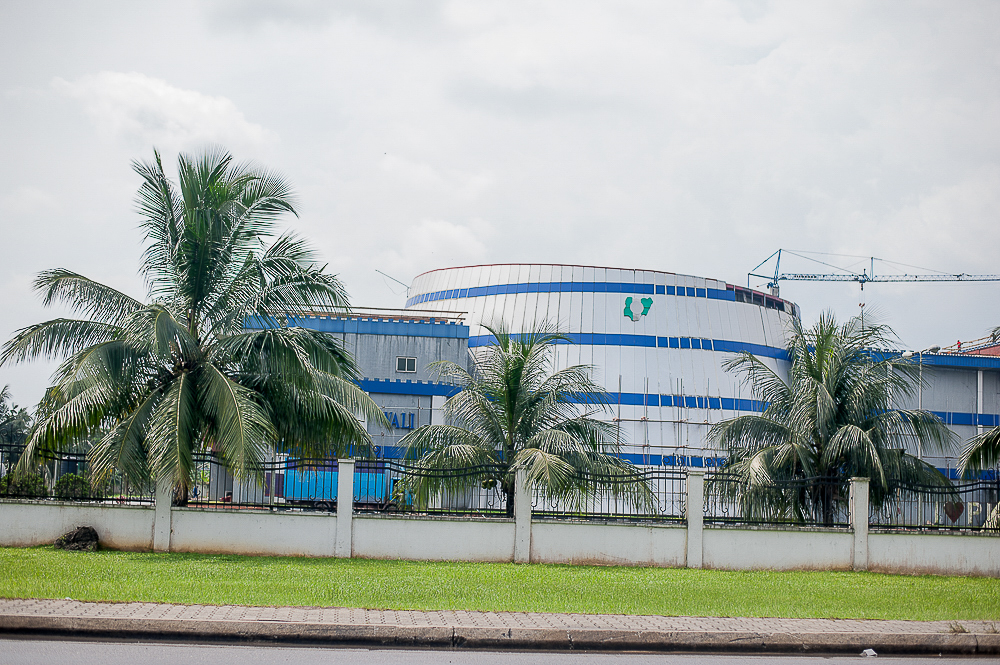

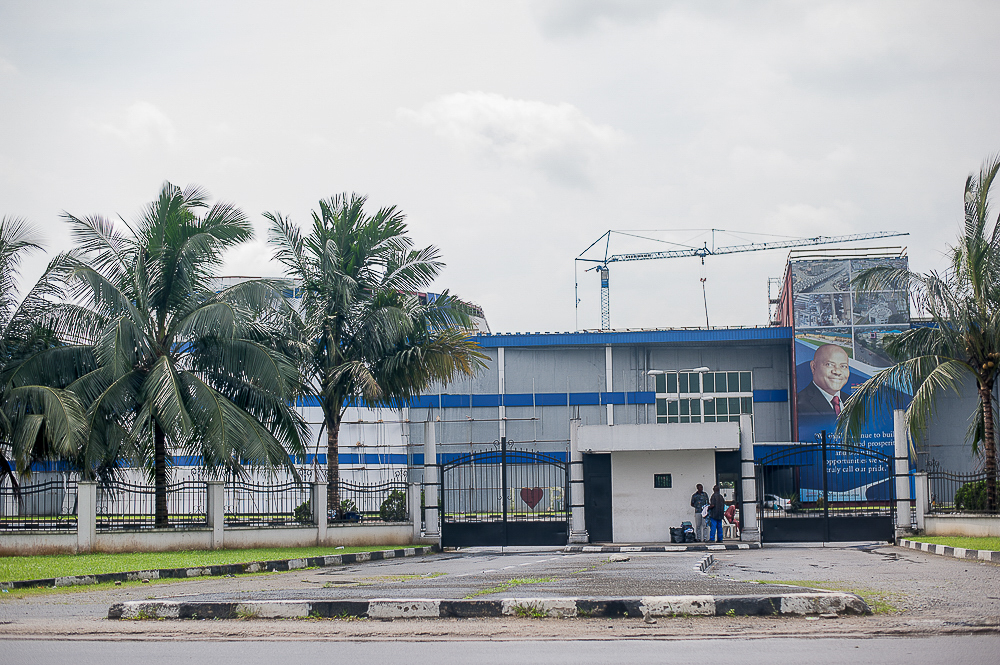

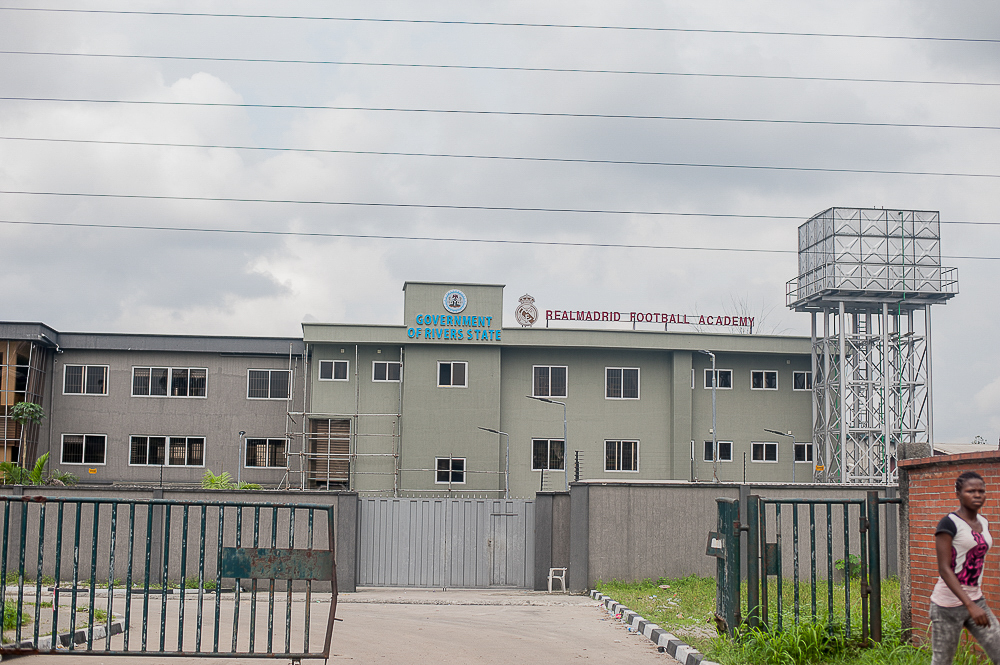

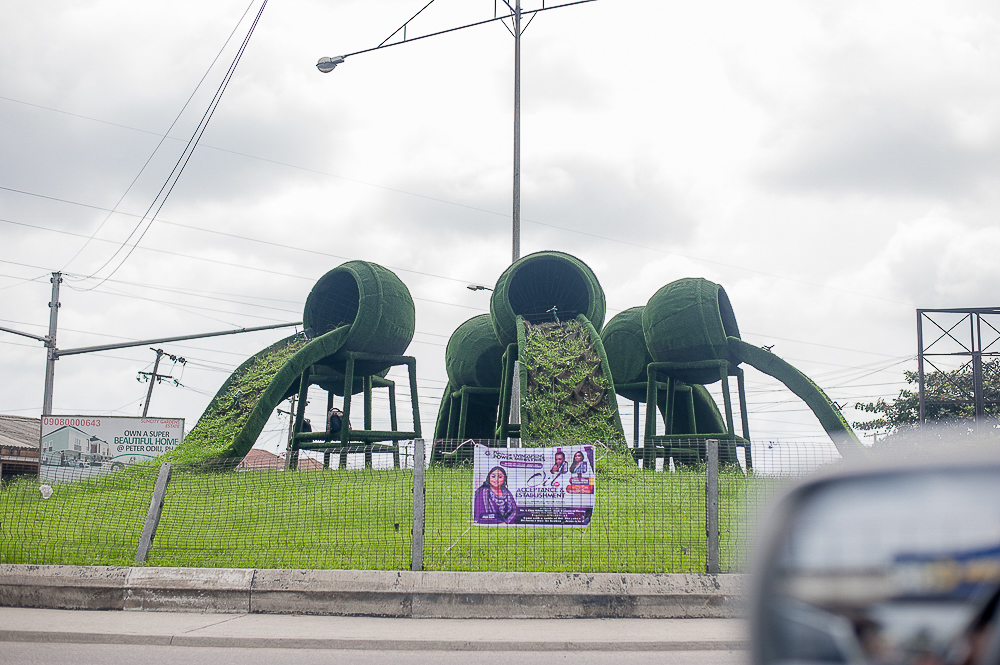

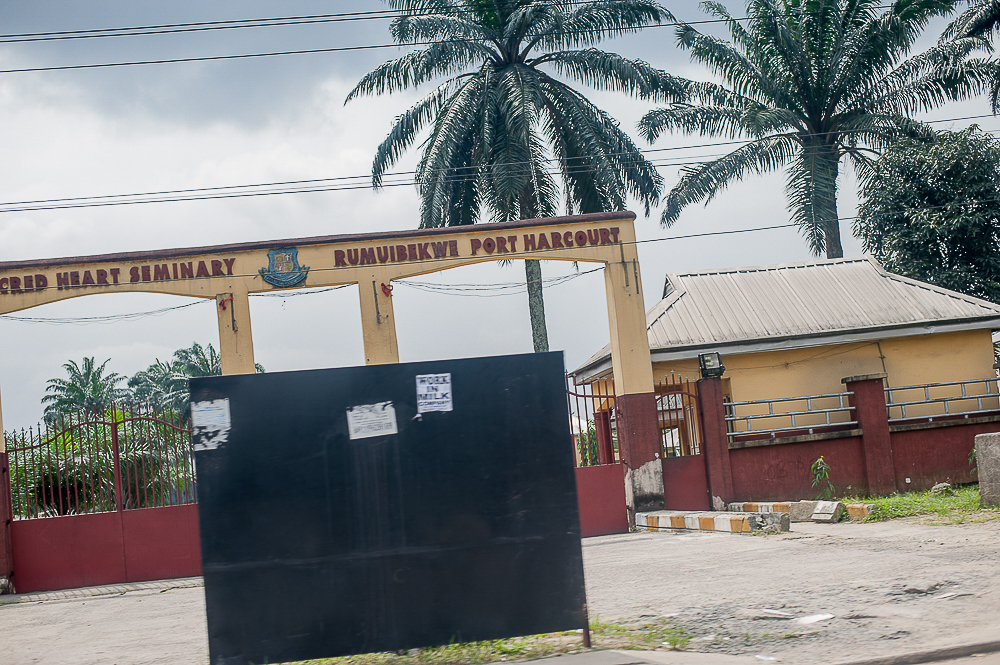

== Twin towns – sister cities ==
Port Harcourt has the following sister city relationships, according to Sister Cities International:

- Kansas City, Missouri, United States

== See also ==
- Bonny Island
- Bori City
- Okrika
- Railway stations in Nigeria
- Capital TV (Nigeria)

== Sources ==
- Wolpe, Howard (15 November 2023). Urban Politics in Nigeria. Berkeley: Univ of California Press. ISBN 978-0-520-33395-6.
