= Old GRA, Port Harcourt =

Old GRA
- Neighbourhood of Port Harcourt
- Interactive map of Old GRA
- Coordinates: 4°46′53″N 7°0′42″E
- Country: Nigeria
- State: Rivers State
- LGA: City of Port Harcourt
- Neighbourhood of: Port Harcourt
- Time zone: UTC+1 (WAT)
- Zip Code: 500241

The Old Government Reserved Area (Old GRA) is a neighbourhood of the city of Port Harcourt, Rivers State in Nigeria. It was primarily inhabited by European settlers during colonial times and was then referred to as the European quarters.

Old GRA is the location of the Rivers State House of Assembly, the People's Democratic Party Secretariat and the NEPAD Rivers State Secretariat. The neighbourhood is also notable as the Port Harcourt home of Nigeria's previous first lady, Patience Jonathan.

== Geography ==
As a mixed-use area, Old GRA combines residential, recreational and business uses. The neighbourhood is bordered to the east by Abuloma, to the north by the D-line neighbourhood, to the west by Diobu and Kidney Island and to the south by Borokiri. It comprises the land covered by the Zip code 500241.

== Education ==
=== Schools ===
Elementary and secondary schools or other educational establishments operating within Old GRA's boundaries include:

- Bereton Montessori Nursery and Primary School, 8 Ernest Ikoli Street
- Faith Baptist College, 2 Rumuoparaeli Street
- Sea Bed Model Primary School
- Port Harcourt Primary School (PHPS)
- Padod Model Primary School, 1 Eleme Street
- Maple Education Inc, 20 Igbodo Street
- Starlets Academy, 5 Yola Street

== Landmarks ==
- Isaac Boro Park, public park established in the 1970s. Named after nationalist leader Isaac Boro.

== Notable residents (past and present) ==
- Patience Jonathan (born 1957), former First Lady of Nigeria
- Olu Benson Lulu-Briggs (born 1930), statesman and businessman.
