= D-line, Port Harcourt =

D-line
- Neighbourhood of Port Harcourt
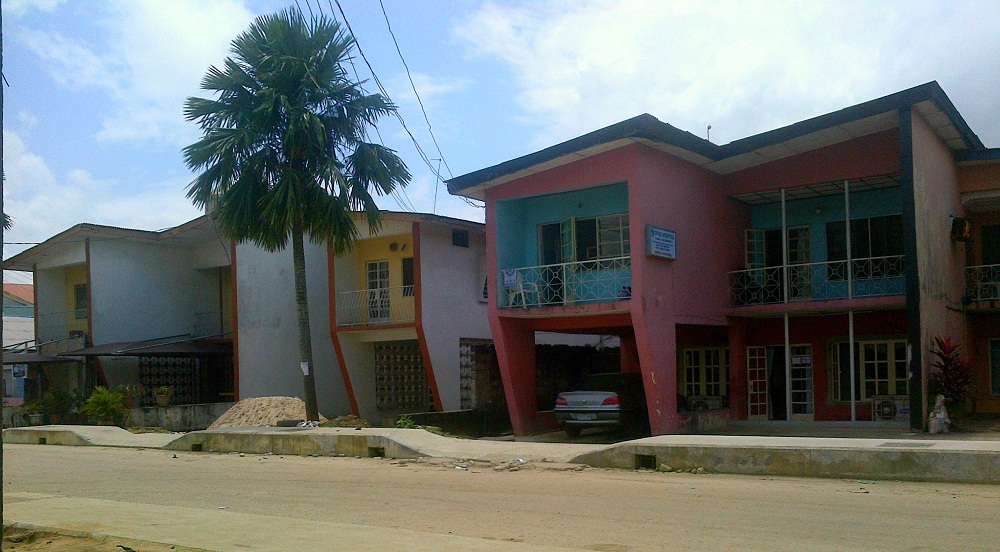
- Interactive map of D-line
- Coordinates: 4°48′8″N 7°0′10″E
- Country: Nigeria
- State: Rivers State
- LGA: Port Harcourt
- City: Port Harcourt
- Time zone: UTC+1 (WAT)

D-line is a commercial and urban residential area of Port Harcourt, Rivers State, Nigeria. Its geographical coordinates are 4°48'8" North, 7°0'10" East. The neighbourhood is sometimes spelled "D/Line" and has a zipcode of 500261.

The Roman Catholic Diocese of Port Harcourt and the Methodist Church of Nigeria have their cathedrals situated in D-line.

== Geography ==
D-line is located approximately 5 km (3 miles) away from the Port Harcourt NAF Base, and approximately 8 km (5 miles) south-west of Elelenwo.

== Education ==
=== Schools ===
There are elementary and secondary schools operating within the D-line boundaries:

- Government Girls Secondary School, Oromineke.
- Methodist Comprehensive High School
- Niger Grammar School

== Organizations ==
Organizations in D-Line, range from law firms, NGO's to Boutique and a Tech Hub.

=== Tech Hub ===
- Olotu Square Solutions - No 1 Khana Street D-Line Port Harcourt, Rivers State

== Notable residents (past and present) ==
- Agbani Darego (born 1982), model, best known as the first black African Miss World.
