= 2024 Orbic Air Eurocopter EC130 crash =

Helicopter crash in California

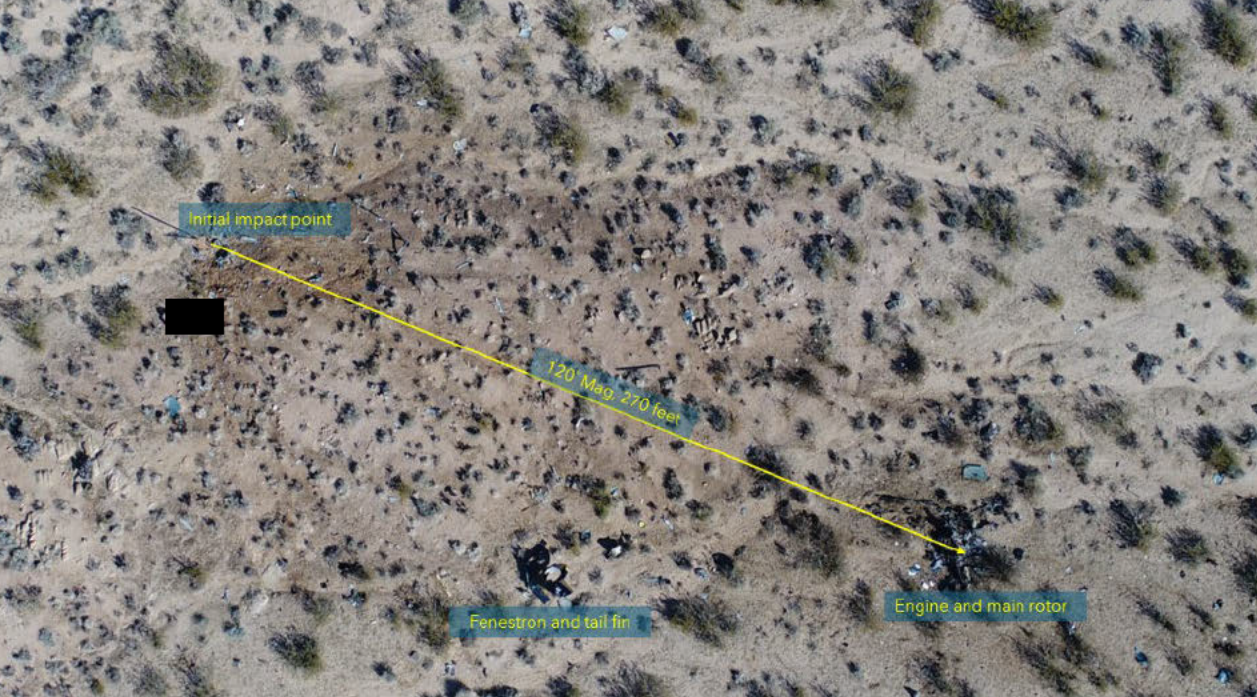
- An overview of the crash site with captions

Accident
- Date: February 9, 2024
- Summary: Loss of control during night, spatial disorientation and poor company oversight
- Site: near Halloran Springs, San Bernardino County, California, United States; 35°22′23.5″N 115°51′50.4″W

Aircraft
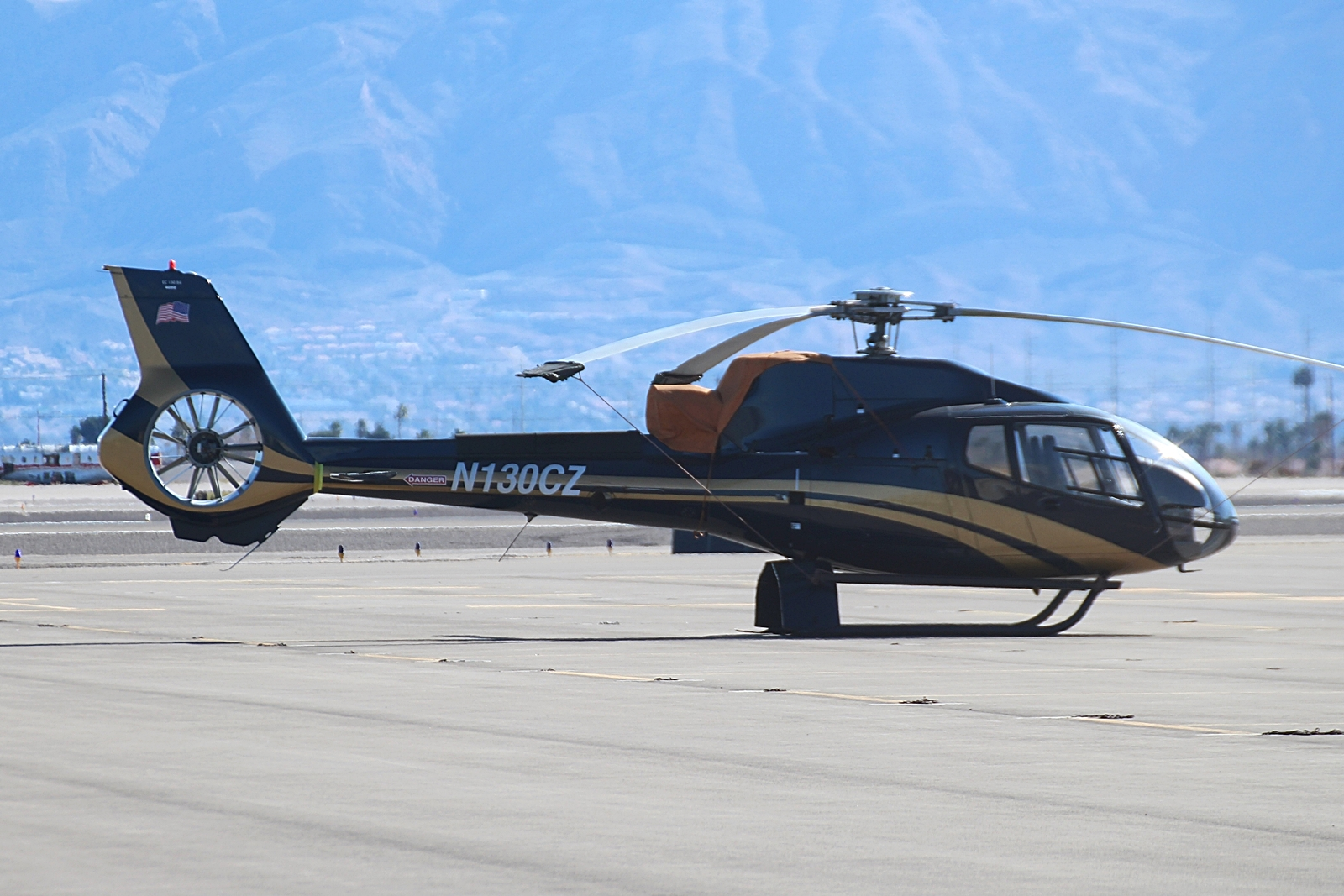
- N130CZ, the helicopter involved in the accident, photographed in 2017
- Aircraft type: Eurocopter EC130B4
- Operator: Orbic Air LLC
- Registration: N130CZ
- Flight origin: Palm Springs International Airport, San Bernardino County, California, United States
- Destination: Boulder City Municipal Airport, Clark County, Nevada, United States
- Occupants: 6
- Passengers: 4
- Crew: 2
- Fatalities: 6
- Survivors: 0

On February 9, 2024, a Eurocopter EC130 crashed in the Mojave Desert near Nipton, California around 10:00 p.m. PST. Six people were on board, including Nigerian banker Herbert Wigwe and former Nigerian Exchange Group Plc Chairman Abimbola Ogunbanjo. There were no survivors.

== Aircraft ==
The helicopter involved was a Eurocopter EC130B4, MSN 4060, registered N130CZ, was built by Airbus Helicopters in 2006. It was powered by a Turbomeca Arriel 2B1 engine.

== Accident ==
The helicopter left Palm Springs International Airport in California and was flying southeast towards Boulder City, Nevada, for that year's Super Bowl in Las Vegas. The weather was unfavorable, with rain and snowfall reported in the area—a remote area with few light sources to aid navigation. The helicopter was slowly losing height and picking up speed over the ground prior to crashing.

All six people aboard the helicopter were killed, namely Herbert Wigwe, the CEO of the Nigerian banking firm Access Bank plc, his wife Doreen Chizoba Wigwe, his 29-year old son Chizi Wigwe, former Nigerian Exchange Group Plc Chairman Abimbola Ogunbanjo, and two crew members.

== Aftermath ==
The remains of Wigwe and his family were repatriated to Nigeria, where they were buried in his hometown in Isiokpo, Rivers State, on 9 March, following a week-long wake in Lagos that was attended by several prominent personalities, including billionaire and Africa's richest person Aliko Dangote.

== Reactions ==
Aliko Dangote pledged to rename the road leading to his oil refinery after Wigwe. Nigerian vice president Kashim Shettima said that Wigwe "left us in winter before the season of bloom." French president Emmanuel Macron described Wigwe's death as the loss of a "great friend".

== Investigation ==
According to a former National Transportation Safety Board (NTSB) investigator, clipping a power line in low visibility conditions might have been the cause of the crash. As of February 2024, the investigation is conducted by the Federal Aviation Administration and the NTSB. The final report into the accident was released on May 6 2025, which cited the cause of the accident was spatial disorientation. The probable cause of the accident was stated to be:

The pilot’s decision to continue the visual flight rules flight into instrument meteorological conditions, which resulted in the pilot’s spatial disorientation and loss of control. Contributing to the accident was the company’s inadequate oversight of its safety management processes, including ensuring the pilots were accurately completing and updating the flight risk analysis, logging maintenance discrepancies, and ensuring the helicopter met Part 135 regulations before departure.
