= Dozie =

- Gender: Male
- Language: Igbo

Origin
- Origin: Nigeria
- Meaning: To settle/repair me
- Region of origin: Igboland

pronunciation

Dozie audio is an Igbo male given name and surname. It means "to settle or repair.". The name Dozie is distinctive, carrying a strong and meaningful undertone.

== Notable individuals with the name ==
- Ikechukwu Dozie (born 1966), Nigerian professor
- Pascal Dozie (1939–2025), Nigerian entrepreneur and businessman
- Uzoma Dozie (born 1969), Nigerian banker, tech investor, and financial inclusion advocate
- Dozie Kanu, Nigerian American artist
- Dozie Nwankwo (born 1975), Nigerian politician
