= Abimbola Ogunbanjo =

Nigerian businessman (1962–2024)

Abimbola Ogunbanjo OFR
- Born: Abimbola Olurotimi Ogunbanjo; 11 July 1962; Federation of Nigeria
- Died: 9 February 2024 (aged 61); Nipton, California, U.S.
- Education: B.Sc. Business Administration from American College, Switzerland LL.B. from University of Buckingham, United Kingdom
- Occupations: Group Chairman of Nigerian Exchange Group, Managing Partner of Chris Ogunbanjo LP.

Abimbola Olurotimi Ogunbanjo OFR (11 July 1962 – 9 February 2024) was a Nigerian businessman who was the Group Chairman of the Nigerian Exchange Group Plc, (NGX Group), the non-operating holding company that emerged from the demutualisation of The Nigerian Stock Exchange (NSE) from 2021 to 2022.

== Early life and education ==
Abimbola Olurotimi Ogunbanjo was born in Nigeria to the family of Chris and Hilda Ogunbanjo, OFR, CON, a distinguished and foremost corporate lawyer, industrialist and philanthropist.

Ogunbanjo had his early education at Corona School Apapa, University of Lagos Staff School, Claremont School, Hastings, Sussex and Igbobi College, Lagos before proceeding to Millfield, Street, Somerset, England, where he attained his GCE "O" Levels.

Abimbola Ogunbanjo held a B.Sc. (Hons) in Business Administration from the American College, Switzerland. He also held LL.B. from University of Buckingham, United Kingdom. He had Certificates in International Capital Markets and Maritime Law from the New York Institute of Finance and the University of Southampton respectively. He provided pro-bono legal services to the Nigerian Chamber of Shipping and the Chris Ogunbanjo Foundation where he also served on its board of directors.

== Career ==
Ogunbanjo was the Group Chairman of Nigerian Exchange Group Plc, (NGX Group) from 2021 to 2022. Prior to this, he was the President of the National Council of the NSE from 2017 to 2021. He served as Managing Partner of the renowned, leading corporate law firm of Chris Ogunbanjo LP (Solicitors), a firm he joined in 1990 after a spell as a credit analyst with Chase Manhattan Bank (Nigeria) Limited. He served on the boards of several multinational corporations and non-profit organizations including Beta Glass Plc and the Advisory Board of the University of Buckingham Centre for Extractive Studies. He also served on the Board of GTL Registrars Limited, AIICO Insurance Plc and ConocoPhillips Limited amongst others.

Ogunbanjo was a member of the International Bar Association, Nigerian Bar Association, Institute of Petroleum and a registered capital market consultant with the Securities and Exchange Commission, Nigeria.

== Philanthropy ==
Ogunbanjo served as Global Ambassador for the Cervical Cancer-Free Nigeria (CCFN) campaign, an initiative of the Global Oncology (GO), a US-based nonprofit organization supported by Stanford University. The CCFN campaign aims to reduce the unnecessary deaths of Nigerian women form cervical cancer, by raising awareness about the safety, efficacy, and availability of the human papillomavirus (HPV) vaccine among the Nigerian public.

== Death ==
On 9 February 2024, he was among six people who died following a helicopter crash near Nipton, California, while he was on his way from Palm Springs International Airport to Boulder City, Nevada on a charter flight operated by Orbic Air LLC with Herbert Wigwe, the CEO of Nigeria's Access Bank plc, Wigwe's wife and son, and two crew members to attend the National Football League championship game, Super Bowl LVIII, in Las Vegas.

== Awards ==
The Elerunwon of Erunwon-Ijebu in Council headed by Alaiyeluwa Oba Johnson Adebayo Adebola Okubena, conferred on Ogunbanjo the traditional title of Bamofin of Erunwon Ijebu Kingdom, meaning the “father of lawyers”, on 8 December 2018.

On 11 October 2022, Nigerian President Muhammadu Buhari conferred the National Honour of Officer of the Order of the Federal Republic (OFR), on Ogunbanjo for his sterling contributions to the development of the Capital Markets, Corporate law and in recognition of his outstanding virtues and in appreciation of his services to Nigeria.
