= Equipment Leasing Association Of Nigeria =

Equipment Leasing Association Of Nigeria is an industry trade group that promotes the development and growth of the equipment leasing industry in Nigeria. Founded in June 1983 by six merchant banks in Nigeria to promote best practices in the industry and protect the interest of member firms.

Today, it is composed of the leading leasing agencies in Nigeria.

== History ==
The business of equipment leasing in Nigeria dates back to the early years of Nigerian independence in the early 1960s, however, such transactions were mostly conducted between British firms and their Nigerian subsidiaries. In the late 1960s, new regulations encouraged local participation which provided the platform for two local financial service firms Benthworth Finance, part of John Holt and NAL Merchant bank to offer leasing services. The industry then went through a period of gradual but slow growth with services provided by merchant banks, which were few in the 1970s.

By 1983, six merchant banks offering such services decided to form an association to protect their interest in equipment leasing, to raise awareness about the industry and stimulate growth within the industry. Membership was subsequently extended to the leading corporate leasing firms, Leventis Technical, John Holt and Bank of Industry. In 1988, it was formally incorporated with the federal government.

The association engages the public through seminars, publications, workshops and training classes.

== Objectives ==
- To act as an umbrella organization representing the interest of members in their relationship with other trade associations, public agencies and governments
- Provide and disseminate information on matters concerning the leasing industry.
- Promote best business practices

== Activities ==
As part of its mission to raise awareness about the leasing market, the organization published a quarterly newsletter titled ''Leasing in Nigeria'', it also hold seminars and training sessions.
