= Nigerian Business Coalition Against AIDS =

Private organization in Nigeria

The Nigerian Business Coalition Against AIDS (NIBUCAA) is a coalition of Private organizations in Nigeria with the aim to complement government's effort in combating the HIV/AIDS epidemic in Nigeria. It was inaugurated on 15 February 2003 by the former president of Nigeria, Chief Olusegun Obasanjo as part of the Nigerian national response to the HIV epidemic. The purpose of the Coalition is to harness the resources of the private sector to support the government in preventing the spread and mitigating the impact of HIV and AIDS in communities; to ensure that people within the corporate workforce, the most-at-risk population and Nigerians in general have access to HIV Counselling, testing, support and Information.

The Coalition is headquartered in Lagos, Nigeria. It serves as a representative of the private sector on the Global Fund County Coordinating Mechanism. Currently, the Coalition is chaired by Herbert Wigwe, with Aliko Dangote, Mike Sangster, Osagie Okunbor, and Lars Richter as board members and Isaiah Owolabi as chief executive officer. The Coalition stated in February 2022 that about 1.9 millions NIgerians are living with the HIV virus in the country. Only 1.6 million people are receiving treatment of the 1.9 million living with the virus. The Nigerian Business Coalition Against AIDS (NIBUCAA) was able to provide support for about 300 people living with HIV with the help of ACCESS Bank. One of the Coalition main aim is to provide partnership to the Federal Government in the fighting of HIV, providing necessary education and community based program aimed at reducing the spread of the Virus. the Coalition also target the reduction of the HIV Virus through Self testing, capacity building and awareness creation i among the Nigerian Workforce.

== Members ==
- Access Bank plc
- Aliko Dangote Foundation
- Julius Berger (company)
- TotalEnergies
- Chevron Corporation
- Shell Nigeria
- Yinka Folawiyo Group
- Century Group
- DMG Events
- Nigeria LNG
- Nigerian Breweries
- Unilever
- MTN Nigeria
- Nestlé
- Guinness
- Lafarge (company)
- Dantata and Sawoe Construction
- NNPC
- CFAO
- Medbury Medical Services
- Statoil
- Flour Mill Nigeria
- Hygeia
- United Bank for Africa
- Bollore Africa Logistics
- Abdulai Taiwo & co
- The Nation newspaper
- Addax Petroleum
- SO&U
- Spectranet
- Sea Trucks Group
- APM Terminals
- Alsako Saad Enterprises
