= Muideen Adebayo Ibrahim =

Nigerian entrepreneur and manufacturer

- Born: October 11, 1967 (age 58)
- Occupations: Entrepreneur, industrialist, management consultant
- Years active: 2016–present
- Employer(s): BAMIB Resources and Investments Company Limited
- Organization(s): BAMIB Resources and Investments Company Limited
- Known for: Founder of BAMIB Pencil and advocacy for local manufacturing in Nigeria
- Notable work: BAMIB Pencil
- Title: Chief Executive Officer

Muideen Adebayo Ibrahim is a Nigerian entrepreneur, industrialist, and management consultant. He is the founder and chief executive officer of BAMIB Resources and Investments Company Limited, a Nigerian local manufacturing company known for producing BAMIB Pencil, a pencil brand manufactured partly from recycled newspapers. He is also the founder of Libra Consulting, a management consulting firm based in Lagos, Nigeria.

== Career ==
Muideen founded BAMIB Resources and Investments Company Limited in 2016 with the objective of promoting indigenous manufacturing and reducing Nigeria's dependence on imported pencils.

The company commenced commercial production in August 2018 following an investment estimated at over ₦40 million.

According to reports, the project received support from the Bank of Industry as well as financial contributions from family members and associates.

BAMIB Pencil is manufactured using recycled newspapers as one of its raw materials in an effort to promote environmental sustainability and reduce waste.

In 2019, Muideen stated that locally manufactured pencils could help Nigeria save billions of naira spent annually on imports.

He later disclosed plans to increase the company's production capacity from about 2.4 million dozens annually to approximately 450 million dozens with additional investment and government support.

== Advocacy ==
Muideen has advocated policies aimed at encouraging local manufacturing in Nigeria.

In 2019, he called on the Federal Government of Nigeria to increase tariffs on imported pencils and strengthen implementation of local content policies.

He has also urged government ministries, departments and agencies to prioritize locally manufactured products.

In 2024, Muideen called on the Federal Government to declare a state of emergency in Nigeria's manufacturing sector, citing challenges such as inadequate electricity supply, multiple taxation and infrastructure deficits.

== Engagement with government ==
Muideen presented locally manufactured pencils to officials of the Federal Ministry of Science and Technology as part of efforts to promote indigenous production.

== See also ==
- Economy of Nigeria
- Bank of Industry
