= Herbert Wigwe =

Nigerian accountant and banker (1966–2024)

Herbert Wigwe CFR
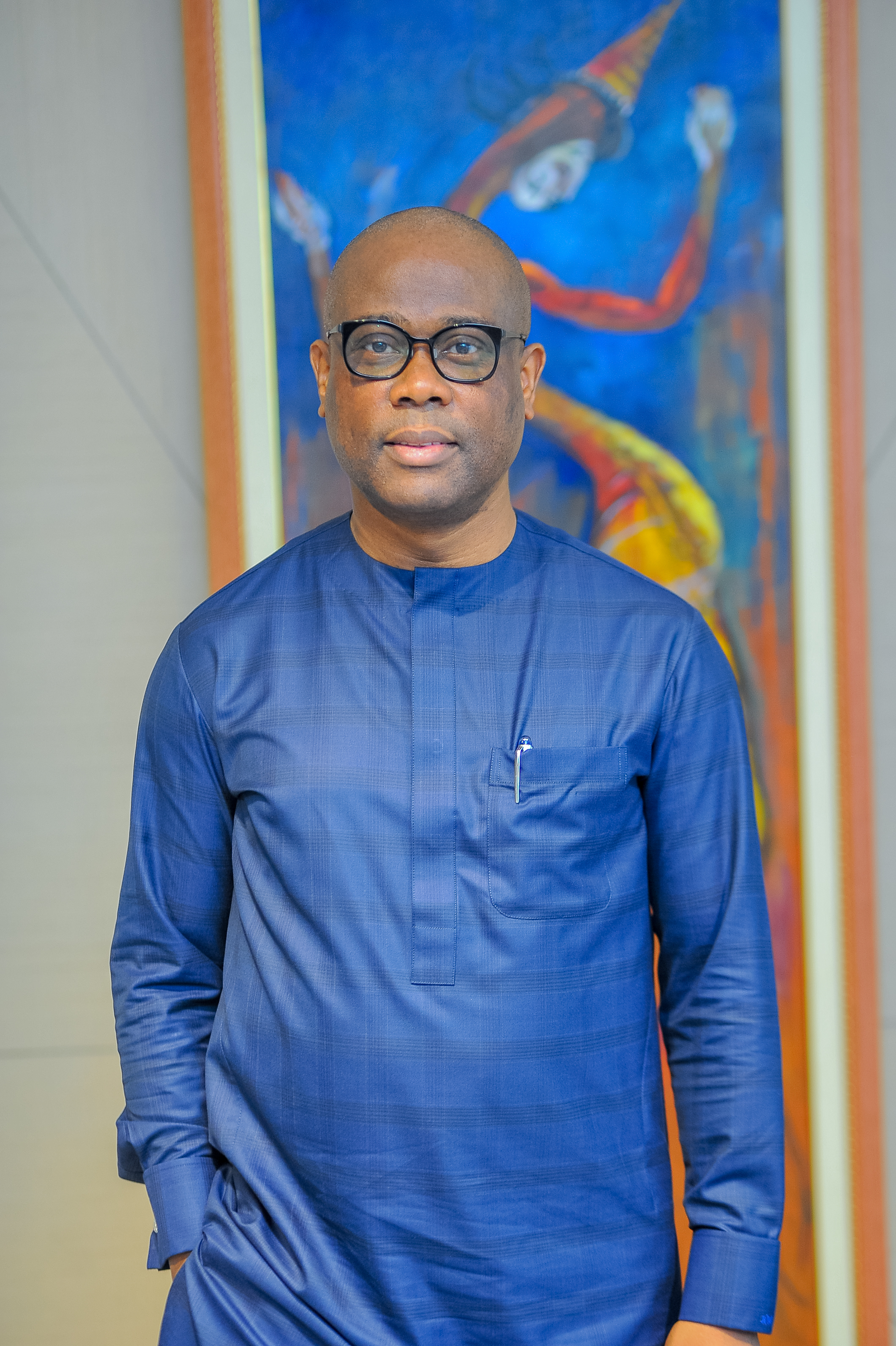
- Wigwe in 2021
- Born: Herbert Onyewumbu Wigwe; 15 August 1966; Ibadan, Oyo State, Nigeria
- Died: 9 February 2024 (aged 57); Nipton, California, U.S.
- Citizenship: Nigerian
- Occupation: MD/CEO of Access Bank Plc
- Partner: Chizoba Wigwe née Nwuba (m. 1994; died 2024)
- Children: 5

Herbert Onyewumbu Wigwe CFR (15 August 1966 – 9 February 2024) was a Nigerian banker and businessman. He was the group managing director and CEO of Access Bank Plc, one of Nigeria's top five banking institutions, after succeeding his business partner, Aigboje Aig-Imoukhuede.

Wigwe started his career at Coopers & Lybrand and Guaranty Trust Bank before joining Access Bank in 2002 as the company's deputy managing director. He became the chief executive officer of the company in January 2014. He died in a helicopter crash on 9 February 2024 in the United States on his way to attend Super Bowl LVIII, which took place in Las Vegas two days later.

== Early life and education ==
Herbert Onyewumbu Wigwe was born on 15 August 1966, in Ibadan, Oyo State, Nigeria. His father was the Director General akin to the head of the Nigerian Television Authority and his mother was a nurse. Wigwe had his early education in Ibadan, then moved to the Federal Government College (FGC) Sokoto, and later to FGC, Warri, Delta state, where he finished his secondary education in 1982. In 1987, he earned a bachelor's degree in accountancy from the University of Nigeria, Nsukka.

In 1990, Wigwe received the British council scholarship to study at the University College of North Wales (now Bangor University), earning a Master of Arts in banking and finance in 1991. He obtained a MSc in financial economics from the University of London in 1996. He attended the Harvard Business School executive management program, and in 2018 he received an honorary doctorate from the University of Nigeria, Nsukka.

== Career ==
Wigwe started his career at Coopers & Lybrand as a management consultant in the late 1980s, becoming a chartered accountant in 1989. He then joined the Guaranty Trust Bank, where he worked for over a decade and eventually became executive director around 1998.

=== Access Bank ===
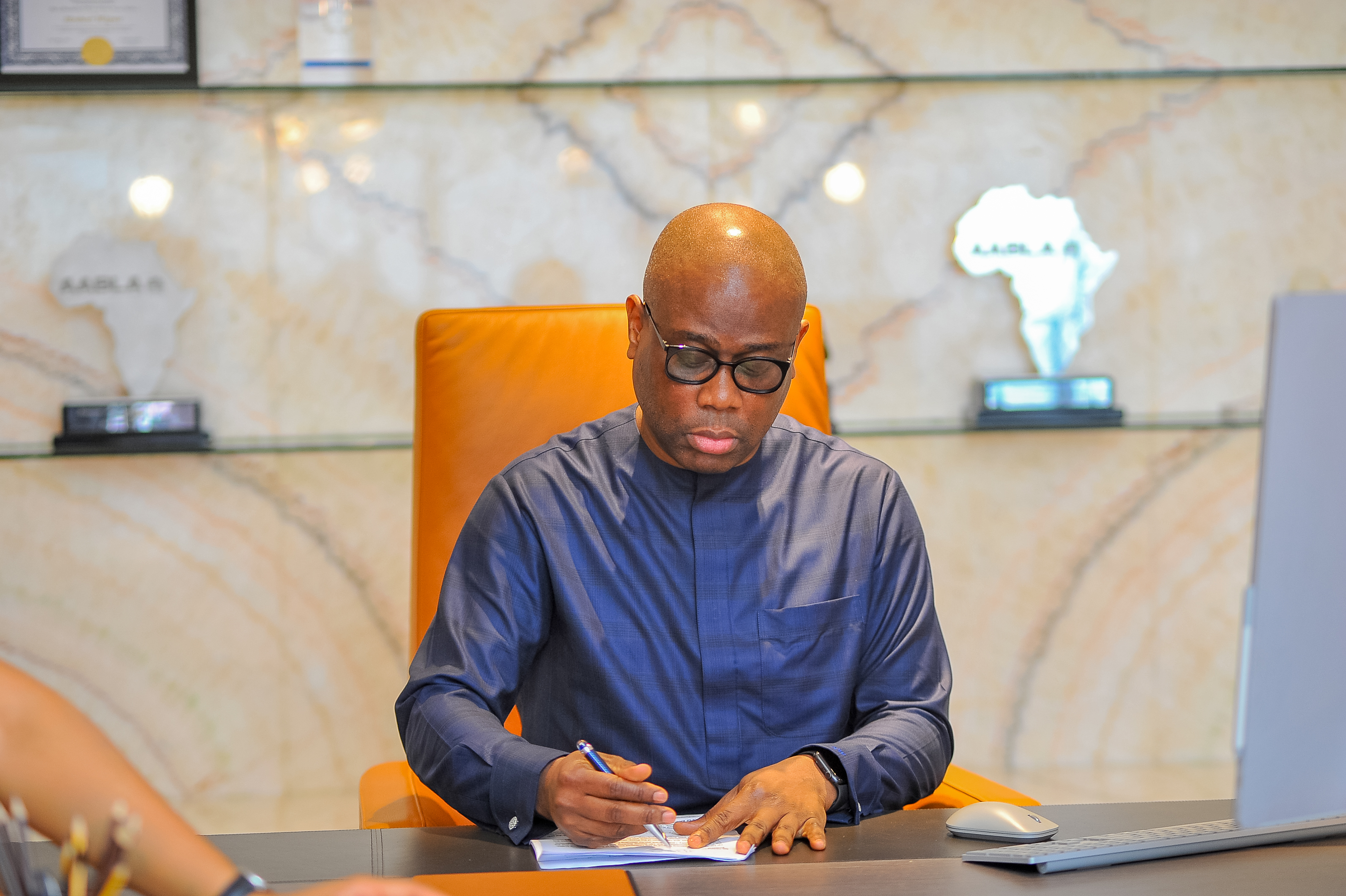
Wigwe in his office at Access Bank headquarters in Lagos

In 2002, Wigwe and his business partner Aigboje Aig-Imoukhuede bought Access Bank. Their purchase was delayed over the Central Bank of Nigeria's concerns the pair were too young to own a bank. Between 2002 and 2017, the bank grew to become the 4th largest bank in Nigeria. In the corresponding period, between 2002 and 2014 he served as the company's deputy managing director He also served as the chairman of Access Bank Ghana Limited starting in 2013. From January 2014 until his death, he was CEO and group managing director of Access Bank.

In 2018 Access Bank merged with competitor Diamond Bank, making it the largest bank in Nigeria. He had planned to expand the bank into Asia in early 2024, but died before any expansion officially launched.

==== The Access Conference ====
Wigwe was involved in the creation of a leadership series known as the Access Conference. The biennial event is Access Bank's response to a global call for corporate involvement in resolving the major challenges facing humanity. Since its inauguration in 2013, the Access Conference has consistently engaged global leaders by provoking debates on issues of threats and opportunities to the world. In the 2013 edition, themed "Sustainable Leadership", Wigwe spoke alongside George W. Bush, Nicolas Sarkozy and John Kufuor, reaffirming the importance of leadership to national and corporate successes.

At the 2015 edition, Wigwe hosted global leaders such as Steve Wozniak, N. R. Narayana Murthy, José María Figueres, Muhammad Yunus to discuss the theme "Leading in a Transformational World – The Imperative of Innovation".

=== Philanthropy ===
Wigwe, Access Bank and UNICEF collaborated to offer support to vulnerable children, orphans, and internally displaced persons in the northern part of Nigeria. To raise awareness for this purpose, the bank organizes the annual high-profile Access Bank/UNICEF Charity Shield Polo tournament.

In 2016, Wigwe founded The HOW Foundation, a non-profit organization.

In February 2017, he was named co-chair of Nigerian Business Coalition against AIDS, a private sector initiative to help eradicate HIV/AIDS in Nigeria and support people living with the condition.

Wigwe University, a private university founded by Wigwe in his hometown Isiokpo in Ikwerre Local Government Area of Rivers State, was set to open in September 2024.

== Personal life ==
Wigwe was married from 1994 to Doreen Chizoba Wigwe (née Nwuba), born 12 July 1967, and had five children.

=== Death ===
Wigwe was among six people who died on 9 February 2024 after the Eurocopter EC130 in which they were travelling crashed near Nipton, California. Also involved in the crash were his wife Doreen Chizoba Wigwe, his 29-year old son Chizi Wigwe, former Nigerian Exchange Group Plc Chairman Abimbola Ogunbanjo, and two crew members. The passengers were on their way from Palm Springs International Airport to Boulder City, Nevada on a charter flight operated by Orbic Air to attend the Super Bowl LVIII in Las Vegas.

The remains of Wigwe and his family were repatriated to Nigeria, where they were buried in his hometown in Isiokpo, Rivers State, on 9 March, following a week-long wake in Lagos that was attended by several prominent personalities, including billionaire and Africa's richest person Aliko Dangote, who pledged to rename the road leading to his oil refinery in his honor, amidst other tributes.

== Awards ==
Wigwe was named 2016 Banker of The Year by The Sun and Vanguard, two of Nigeria's largest newspapers.

In recognition of "his exemplary role in the society and contributions to youth development", the Boys' Brigade inaugurated Herbert Wigwe as State Patron for Lagos State Council in 2016.

In October 2022, Commander of the Order of the Federal Republic, a Nigerian national honour, was conferred on him by President Muhammadu Buhari.
