= Antonia Ally =

Nigerian social entrepreneur

- Born: Antonia Ally; Nigeria
- Citizenship: Nigeria
- Education: Brunel University, United Kingdom
- Occupation: Social Entrepreneur/Activist
- Organization: HOW Foundation
- Known for: Educational development and technology
- Notable work: Former CEO of The HOW Foundation, a non-profit organisation founded by Dr. Herbert Wigwe

Antonia Ally is a Nigerian social entrepreneur, former CEO of The How Foundation, a non-profit organisation founded by Dr. Herbert Wigwe, in January 2016.

Through HOW Foundation, Ally has distributed over 10,000 free mosquito nets, 5,000 free medicines for preventing and curing malaria and won the Global Peace Ambassador in 2017 by the United Nations.
