= Chris Ogunbanjo =

Nigerian lawyer (1923–2023)

Chief Chris Ogunbanjo CON
- Born: 14 December 1923
- Education: Igbobi College
- Occupation: Businessman Corporate lawyer
- Children: Abimbola Ogunbanjo

Chief Christopher Oladipo Ogunbanjo (14 December 1923 – 7 October 2023) was a Nigerian businessman, corporate lawyer and philanthropist. In the late 1960s, he was among the group of businessmen who supported local equity participation in foreign firms operating in Nigeria. He was also an early advocate of domiciliary accounts in Nigeria which later came to existence through the promulgation of the Foreign Currency Decree 18 of 1985.

== Life and career ==
Ogunbanjo was born on 14 December 1923, to the family of Daniel Ajayi Ogunbanjo, a catechist from Erunwon, Ijebu, Ogun State. He was educated at St Phillips Primary School, Aiyetoro, Ile-Ife before proceeding to Oduduwa College, Ife for his secondary education in 1936. Two years later, he transferred to Igbobi College in Lagos. He began work in 1942 as a junior clerk in the Judicial Dept in Enugu and was subsequently transferred to Port Harcourt. He left the civil service in 1946 to study law at the University of London, Ogunbanjo obtained a law degree in 1949 and was called to the bar in 1950. On his return from London, he worked briefly for the law firm of H.O. Davies before establishing his own private practice; his firm added two more partners, Samuel Ladoke Akintola and Michael Odesanya in 1952 to become Samuel, Chris and Michael Solicitors. The partnership was dissolved in 1960 and his practice became Chris Ogunbanjo & Co. The new practice specialized in corporate law.

Ogunbanjo's familiarity with corporate law led him to be a significant shareholder in various Nigerian companies like: West African Batteries, Metal Box Toyo, Union Securities, 3M Nigeria, ABB Nigeria, Roche Nigeria and Chemical and Allied Products Ltd.

== Personal life ==
Ogunbanjo married Hilda Ladipo in 1953. His wife was editor of AMBER, a women's lifestyle magazine established in the 1960s but later acquired by Daily Times.

== Death ==
Chris Ogunbanjo died on 7 October 2023, at the age of 99. His son Abimbola Ogunbanjo died aged 61, four months later on 9 February 2024, following a helicopter crash near Nipton, California.
