= HOW Foundation =

Nigerian non-profit organization

Herbert Onyewumbu Wigwe Foundation
- Abbreviation: HOW
- Formation: 2016; 10 years ago
- Type: private operating foundation
- Purpose: Healthcare, Education, Mentorship
- Headquarters: Lagos, Nigeria
- Region served: Nigeria
- Key people: Herbert O. Wigwe, founder Anthonia Ally, CEO
- Website: thehowfoundation.org

The Herbert Onyewumbu Wigwe Foundation (HOW) is a Nigerian non-profit organization founded in 2016 by banker and entrepreneur Herbert O. Wigwe and headquartered in Lagos. Its CEO is Anthonia Ally.

== History and objectives ==
Herbert O. Wigwe (1966–2024) founded the HOW Foundation in 2016 as a social enterprise. It focuses on youth empowerment through leadership and mentorship and on health, specifically malaria and prostate cancer.

== Programs ==
=== Give Malaria No Place ===
The Give Malaria No Place (GMNP) initiative with Doctors Save A Life Foundation includes education, rapid-response testing, and distribution of mosquito nets and medication to prevent and treat malaria.

=== Prostate cancer awareness ===
Recognizing that prostate cancer is particularly common among Black men and that low awareness among Nigerians leads to its being diagnosed only when advanced, the foundation sponsored a charity football match to mark Prostate Cancer Awareness Month in September 2017.

=== Youth programmes ===
The foundation finances leadership and mentorship seminars with U.K.-based motivational speaker Joshua Ajitena for students in government secondary schools, and awards prizes and scholarships to top students. The foundation is also a major sponsor of God's Children Great Talent, an annual gospel-focused talent contest for children and young people organized by the City of David parish of the Redeemed Christian Church of God.

=== Food distribution during COVID-19 lockdown ===
During the COVID-19 pandemic, the foundation distributed food and relief packages in Wigwe's hometown of Isiokpo and other communities in Rivers State, to alleviate the effects of lockdown and other restrictions.
