= Crystal Chigbu =

Nigerian entrepreneur

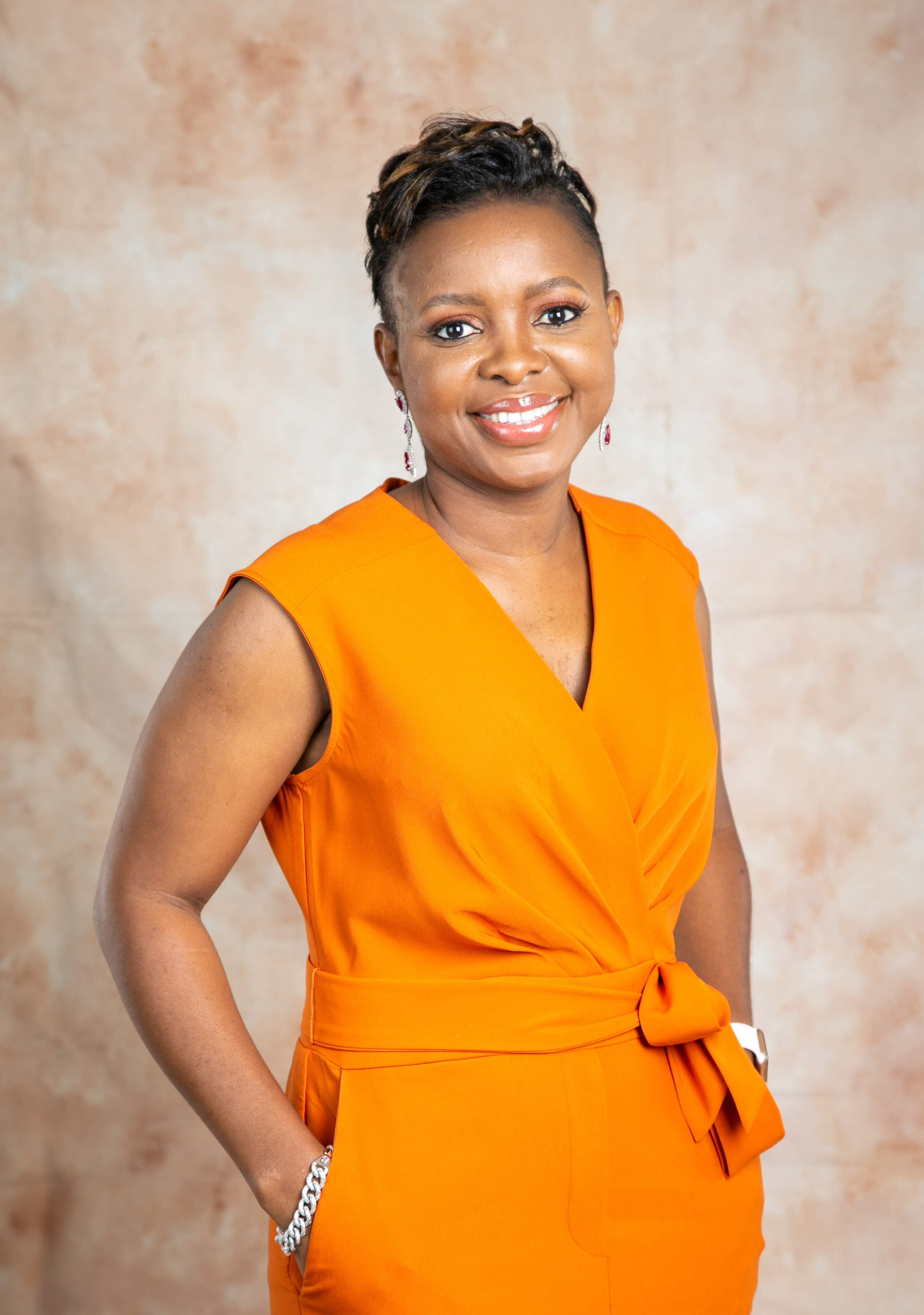
- Born: Epe, Lagos State
- Education: Graduate of Biochemistry
- Alma mater: University of Lagos
- Occupations: Social Entrepreneur and Activist
- Organization: The IREDE Foundation
- Notable work: Through her foundation, Crystal has provided over 120 prosthetic limbs to over 82 children across 17 states in Nigeria
- Spouse: Zubby Chigbu
- Children: 2
- Awards: Life Transformation Award from Wise Women Awards. The Ebony Life TV sponsored Sisterhood Award for Philanthropist of the year (2014). The Naija Diamonds Award (2014) sponsored by Diamond Bank

Crystal Chigbu is a Nigerian social entrepreneur and a development consultant. She founded The IREDE Foundation after her daughter was born without a shinbone. Her foundation provides prosthetics and other walking aids to children 18 and under. Through her foundation, Crystal has provided over 120 prosthetic limbs to over 82 children across 17 states in Nigeria.

== Education and career ==
She is a graduate of University of Lagos with a Bachelor of Science Degree in Biochemistry. Crystal is a member of the Business and Professional Women of Nigeria, a member of the Nigerian Network of NGOs, and a graduate of the Pan African University's Enterprise Development Centre. She is a graduate of the Acumen fellowship program.

== Personal life ==
Crystal hails from Epe in Lagos state and married to Zubby Chigbu and they have two children together. Crystal Chigbu's daughter was born without a tibia and a knee cap. As a result, Crystal and her husband labored nonstop to find a solution. Getting their daughter an artificial limb was the smartest idea they'd ever done, and it was from there that the desire to aid other children, particularly those who couldn't afford one, arose.

== Crystal and The IREDE Foundation ==
Crystal founded after working for 12 years as a sales and marketing manager for Procter and Gamble. The IREDE Foundation to advocate for young amputees and children with limb disorders, as well as to work closely with specialists and the community to ensure that they are self-sufficient. The foundation seeks to accomplish this by providing prosthetic and orthodontic devices to underprivileged youngsters (ages 2 to 18). It also encourages children and their parents through support groups and helps them reintegrate into the school system following their recovery. The Foundation started precisely 23 August 2012, but the plan began in June 2012.

== Awards and recognition ==
Crystal Chigbu has received several awards for her work including the Life Transformation Award from Wise Women Awards., The Ebony Life TV sponsored Sisterhood Award for Philanthropist of the year (2014) and the Naija Diamonds Award (2014) sponsored by Diamond Bank. She has also been nominated for HNWOTY special award.
