= Ofovwe Aig-Imoukhuede =

Nigerian philanthropist, lawyer and banker (born 1970)

- Born: 18 January 1970 (age 56); Lagos
- Education: King's College London; University of Cambridge; London School of Economics and Political Science
- Occupations: Philanthropist lawyer banker
- Known for: Executive Vice-Chair of the Aig-Imoukhuede Foundation; Vice-Chair, Ovie Brume Foundation
- Spouse: Aigboje Aig-Imoukhuede
- Parents: Fred Brume (father); Evelyn Oputu (mother)

Ofovwe Aig-Imoukhuede (born 18 January 1970) is a Nigerian philanthropist, lawyer, and banker.

== Early life and education ==
Ofovwe Aig-Imoukhuede was born in Lagos, Nigeria, the first child of Fred Brume and Evelyn Oputu.

She holds an LLB from King's College London, a Bachelor of Law from the Nigerian Law School, an MBA from the University of Cambridge, where she was a Chevening Scholar and an MSc in Development Management from the London School of Economics.

== Career ==
Aig-Imoukhuede began her career as a banker in 1992 with Nigeria International Bank (now Citibank Nigeria) and later joined FBN (Merchant Bankers), Nigeria in 1994. She returned to Citibank Nigeria in 2000 as the Head of the Bank's Sales and Marketing e-Business Group.

She co-founded the Aig-Imoukhuede Foundation with her husband, Aigboje Aig-Imoukhuede, to improve public service delivery and increase access to quality primary healthcare in Africa. As Executive Vice-Chair of the Aig-Imoukhuede Foundation, Aig-Imoukhuede is responsible for overseeing the strategic direction and operational execution of the Foundation’s projects and programmes.

Aig-Imoukhuede's philanthropic endeavours extend beyond the Aig-Imoukhuede Foundation. She serves as the Vice-Chair of The Ovie Brume Foundation’s board, an organisation committed to providing educational programmes and services to underserved Nigerian children. She is also an Advisory Board Member of the Oxford University Africa Society and a Trustee of The Funding Network.

== Achievements and Awards ==
At the 2025 Arise Women of Impact Gala, held at the Eko Convention Centre in Lagos, Ofovwe was honoured as one of the Women Making Impact in Nigeria.

In May 2026, she was appointed as a board member of Women's World Banking. The purpose of this appointment is to drive financial inclusion for women globally.

== Personal life ==
Ofovwe is married to Aigboje Aig-Imoukhuede and they have four children.
