= The Irede Foundation =

The Irede Foundation (TIF) is a foundation established in 2012 by Crystal Chigbu to educate Nigerians on congenital and acquired limb loss, how to associate with and care for children with this kind of loss. The foundation provides free and subsidized artificial limbs for children who cannot afford them. They focus on children within the ages of 0–18 years. The foundation has its laboratory in Lagos for assembling prosthetics. The foundation was named the humanitarian foundation of the year in 2017 by Green October Event 2017.

== Impacts and Projects ==
Since the inception of The Irede Foundation, it has reportedly established contacts in over 40 locations globally, reaching out and giving direct support to over 15,000 people, as well as an indirect reach of about 10 million people globally. This has helped create awareness about limb loss and limb difference, which stimulates awareness about the work of the foundation and the support available for target stakeholders, raising funds to continue in empowering child amputees. The foundation had also launched an Inclusive Education Project, to support and ensure that children living with disabilities can thrive while bringing their whole selves to the academic environment. The foundation also recently launched a comic-book for children living with disabilities.

=== Out-on-a-Limb ===
The foundation also has a global annual advocacy walk tagged Out On a Limb. The advocacy walk spotlights and promotes awareness for children living with disabilities and others fighting against peer discrimination.

=== Advocacy ===
The Foundation frequently works closely with local governments to provide access to health care, as well as support for young amputees, saying the high cost of prosthetic limbs has made it impossible for a lot of people to get them when necessary. The advocacy mantra of the Foundation is "No child should be out of school or limited due to a disability". The Foundation continually seeks to work with the government to provide subsidized prosthesis health care for children across the country. To this effect, in the past two years the foundation has launched an inclusive magazine for children which highlights disabilities in children, promotes inclusion, and discourages discrimination and bullying,

== Partnerships ==
Procter and Gamble partnered with The Irede Foundation to launch the #limitless Project, which seeks to advance inclusive education by sensitizing teachers, parents, and even communities where all children can learn. The first edition of the organization's project was launched at an event at Ikeja Junior and Senior High School in Lagos, Nigeria.

The #Limitless Project partnership aims to reach over 1,000 children living with disabilities in public schools over the next two years.

Aspire Coronation Trust also partnered with The Irede Foundation to launch a Leadership Program for young persons with disabilities. The program is for young persons with disabilities between 18 - 30 in all locations across Nigeria. Funded by the Aspire Coronation Trust (ACT) Foundation, the Leadership Program is designed to equip persons living with a disability between the age of 18 - 30 with the required leadership knowledge, skill, and mindset overhaul on the possibilities of building and maintaining their desired career path.
