= Intercontinental Bank =

Commercial bank in Nigeria

Intercontinental Bank plc
- Formerly: Nigerian Intercontinental Merchant Bank Limited
- Company type: Public
- Traded as: Previously NGX:INTERCONT
- Industry: Financial services
- Founded: 1989
- Defunct: 2013
- Fate: Acquired
- Successor: Access Bank Plc
- Headquarters: Lagos, Nigeria
- Key people: Raymond C. Obieri (Chairman), Mahmud Lai Alabi (Managing Director & CEO)
- Products: Loans, cheque, savings, investments, debit cards, credit cards
- Owner: Access Bank Plc
- Website: www.accessbankplc.com

Intercontinental Bank, commonly referred to Intercontinental, was a Nigerian commercial bank that operated from 1989 until it was acquired by Access Bank plc in 2013. Prior to its acquisition, Intercontinental Bank was one of the twenty-four commercial banks licensed by the Central Bank of Nigeria, the country's banking regulator.

Prior to the merger, Intercontinental Bank was a large financial services provider in West Africa. As of December 2008, the bank's shareholder's equity was valued at approximately US$1.7 billion (NGN:261 billion).

== History ==
The bank was established in 1989 under the name Nigerian Intercontinental Merchant Bank Limited. That same year, the first subsidiary, Intercontinental Securities Limited, was established. In 1996, the bank acquired controlling shareholding in Equity Bank of Nigeria, a commercial bank. Also in 1996, Intercontinental acquired majority shareholding in insurance company West African Provincial Company (WAPIC). Intercontinental converted into a commercial bank in 1999. In 2002, the company listed its shares on the Nigerian Stock Exchange.

In 2005, Intercontinental successfully merged with three other commercial banks, in which it held equity positions prior to the merger, namely Equity Bank of Nigeria, Gateway Bank and Global Bank.

In 2009, after a special audit of the commercial banks in Nigeria by the Central Bank of Nigeria, the country's banking regulator, found nine of the banks to be under-capitalized and badly managed. Intercontinental Bank Plc. was one of the troubled banks. Following the injection of capital by the Federal Government of Nigeria, to maintain solvency, the troubled banks embarked on re-capitalization through participation by new investors.

In 2011, Access Bank began talks with the Central Bank of Nigeria to acquire Intercontinental Bank. Further to the approval of the shareholders of Intercontinental bank and Access Bank, court sanction of the Federal High Court of Nigeria and approval of the Central Bank of Nigeria and the Securities & Exchange Commission, Access Bank plc completed recapitalization of Intercontinental Bank and the acquisition of 75% majority interest in Intercontinental Bank. In effect, Intercontinental Bank (including all its assets, liabilities and undertakings) became a subsidiary of Access Bank plc. Aluko & Oyebode acted as Transaction Counsel to Access Bank plc in connection with its acquisition of Intercontinental Bank plc.

In 2013, Intercontinental Bank merged with Access Bank, thereby incorporating intercontinental bank and all its assets to Access Bank plc.

== Subsidiaries ==
The bank had the following subsidiary companies, as of December 2010: Together with the parent bank, they sometimes were referred to as the Intercontinental Group of Companies.

- Intercontinental Securities Limited
- Intercontinental Bank Ghana Limited
- Intercontinental Finance and Investments Limited
- Intercontinental Bank United Kingdom plc
- Intercontinental Homes Savings and Loans Limited
- Intercontinental Registrars Limited
- Intercontinental Capital Markets Limited
- Intercontinental Wapic Insurance plc
- Intercontinental Properties Limited
- Intercontinental Trustees Limited

== Governance ==
Prior to the merger, the Chairman of the Board was Raymond C. Obieri, while the Managing Director and Chief Executive Officer was Mahmud Lai Alabi.

== See also ==
- List of banks in Nigeria
- Central Bank of Nigeria
- Economy of Nigeria
