= Olasupo Olusi =

Nigerian economist and business executive

- Born: Unknown date of birth, most likely 1968–1975; Nigeria
- Education: Hull University
- Occupations: Economist, business executive
- Known for: Managing director and chief executive officer of the Bank of Industry (BOI)

Olasupo Olusi is a Nigerian economist and development finance executive who has served as managing director and chief executive officer of the Bank of Industry (BOI) since October 2023.

His appointment was approved by President Bola Tinubu, following the resignation of Olukayode Pitan.

Olusi has experience in economic policy and development finance, including nearly two decades at the World Bank Group and roles with the International Finance Corporation (IFC). Between 2011 and 2015, he served as Economic Adviser to Nigeria's Coordinating Minister of the Economy.

== Early life and education ==
Olusi obtained a B.Sc. in economics from Hull University, United Kingdom; an M.Sc. in International Money, Finance, and Investment from Durham University; and a Ph.D. in economics from Durham University.

He is a member of the Royal Economic Society (United Kingdom) and the American Finance Association (USA).

== Career ==
=== World Bank Group ===
Olusi spent approximately two decades at the World Bank Group in positions including World Bank Country Economist and Senior Private Sector Specialist at the International Finance Corporation.

His work focused on private sector development, capital markets reform, and development finance across multiple countries.

In 2020, he led a core team that delivered the World Bank Group's inaugural comprehensive assessment of Nigeria's private sector.

=== Federal Ministry of Finance ===
Between 2011 and 2015, Olusi served as Economic Adviser in Nigeria to Coordinating Minister of the Economy and Minister of Finance Ngozi Okonjo-Iweala.

During this period, he oversaw the YOUWIN programme, a federal government initiative designed to promote youth entrepreneurship through grants and soft loans.

=== Bank of Industry ===
Olusi was appointed managing director and CEO of the Bank of Industry in October 2023 for a four-year term.

The Bank of Industry is Nigeria's principal development finance institution, providing financing and advisory support for business development across multiple sectors.

Under his leadership, the Bank of Industry launched a ₦10 billion intervention fund aimed at supporting women entrepreneurs and bridging financing gaps for female-led businesses.

He has also advocated for vocational and technical skills development as a strategy for economic growth and industrial productivity in Nigeria.

In 2025, Olusi reaffirmed the Bank of Industry's commitment to sustainable industrial growth and regional economic development across Africa.

In an interview with African Business, Olusi stated that demand for the Bank of Industry's services had reached unprecedented levels amid increasing financing needs among Nigerian businesses.
