= Halloran Springs, California =

Unincorporated community in California, United States

Halloran Springs
- unincorporated community
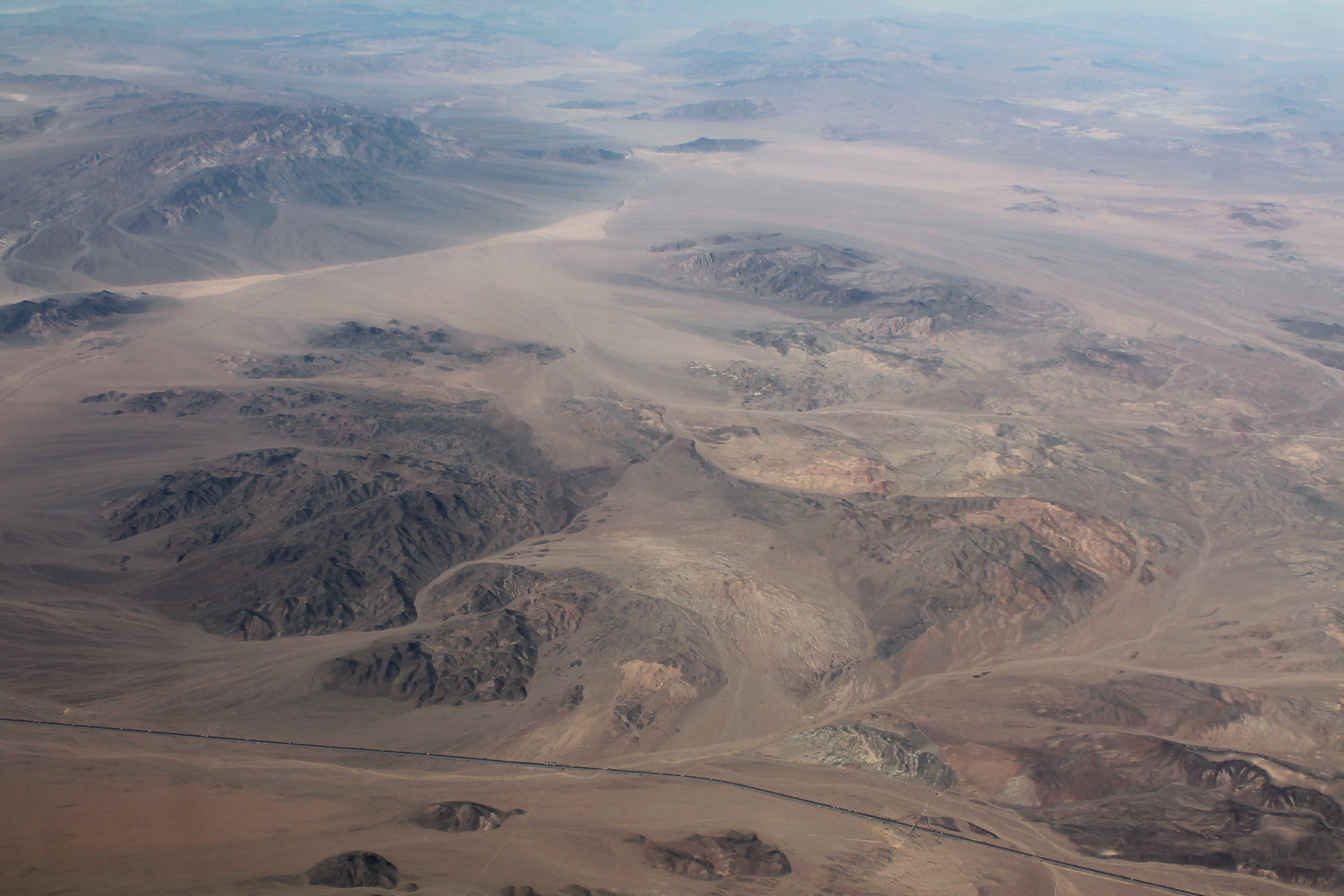
- Aerial view of the sorrunding area. The interstate exit at Halloran Springs can be seen at the bottom right.

- Location within the state of California Halloran Springs (the United States)
- Coordinates: 35°22′21″N 115°53′26″W
- Country: United States
- State: California
- County: San Bernardino
- Elevation: 2,990 ft (910 m)
- Time zone: UTC-8 (Pacific (PST))
  - Summer (DST): UTC-7 (PDT)
- ZIP code: 92309
- Area codes: 442/760
- FIPS code: 06-31736
- GNIS feature ID: 1667018

Halloran Springs is a set of springs in the Mojave Desert in San Bernardino County, California, United States. It is located on Interstate 15 between Baker, California and Las Vegas, Nevada approximately 15 miles (24 km) northeast of Baker.

The ZIP code is 92309 and the community is inside area codes 442 and 760.

It is a popular site for urban exploration due to the abandoned train and gas station, which has a graffitied OBEY sign below a large, red, lettered sign that says "EAT." On February 9, 2024, a helicopter crashed near Halloran Springs. All six people on board were killed.
