= Ikwerre, Nigeria =

Ikwerre
- LGA
- Interactive map of Ikwerre
- Location within Nigeria Location within Africa
- Coordinates: 5°06′N 6°54′E
- Country: Nigeria
- State: Rivers State
- Date created: 1991
- Seat: Isiokpo

Area
  - Total: 1,380 km^{2} (530 sq mi)
- Time zone: UTC+1 (WAT)

Ikwerre is a Local Government Area in Rivers State, Nigeria. Its headquarters is in the town of Isiokpo 'known as the ancient Kingdom of Ikwerre land'. It is the first local government created of the Ikwerre and later Emohua, Obio/Akpor and Port Harcourt LGAs were created. The Ikwerre group occupies the upland region of Rivers State. It shares boundaries with Imo State to the north, Emohua to the west, Etche to the east, and Obio-Akpor to the south.

The postal code of the area is 511001.

== Climate/Geography ==
Ikwerre LGA has an average annual temperature of 26 degrees Celsius (80 degrees Fahrenheit) and a total size of 1,380 square kilometres or 530 square miles. The Lower Gulch Area experiences two distinct seasons—the dry and the rainy—with an average humidity level of 90%. In Ikwerre LGA, the wet seasons are distinguished by prolonged precipitation and typically persist longer than the dry ones.

== Town and Communities ==
- Isiokpo
- Elele
- Omagwa
- Ipo
- Aluu
- Omuanwa
- Omademe
- Ozuaha
- Ubima.
- Apani
- Omerelu
