= Uzoma Dozie =

British-Nigerian financial technology investor

- Born: 2 November 1969 (age 56); London, United Kingdom
- Citizenship: Nigeria
- Education: Master of Business Administration (Imperial College); Bachelor of Science (University of Reading); Master of Science (University College London)
- Occupation: Chief Executive Officer Sparkle
- Years active: 2005 — present
- Known for: Banking
- Father: Pascal Dozie
- Relatives: Peace Anyiam-Osigwe

Uzoma Dozie (born 2 November 1969) is a banker, tech investor and financial inclusion advocate. He is the CEO and Founder of Sparkle, a financial technology community and 'ecosystem'. Before launching Sparkle in 2019, he was the GMD and Bank CEO of Diamond Bank from 2014 and successfully implemented a merger with Access Bank Plc in 2018. While at Diamond Bank, Uzoma also served as Executive Director of Corporate Banking and Executive Director of Regional Business Lagos & West Regions.

== Early life ==
Uzoma was born in London, United Kingdom to Pascal Dozie, the founder of Diamond Bank.

== Career ==
Following his time in the Nigerian banking sector, Uzoma Dozie launched Sparkle, the mobile-first platform which is focused on Nigeria's retail sector and will tackle how retailers achieve their daily objectives and scale their businesses.

He is also known for investing in a number of Nigerian technology start-ups through his angel fund, Black Knights.

== Public life ==
Uzoma is also on the Board of Women's World Banking and regularly speaks at conferences and events around the world, on the subject of financial inclusion, technology and how technology can scale.

He is also a well-known advocate for showcasing technology start-up CEOs and has fronted an online TV show called Tech Turks for a number of years, whereby he discusses challenges and opportunities of building tech businesses in Nigeria, with some of the country's leading entrepreneurs.

He also launched TechFest in 2018 bringing together leading dignitaries of Nigeria's technology and business sectors.
