= Aigboje Aig-Imoukhuede =

Nigerian economist and banker

Aigboje Aig-Imoukhuede CFR
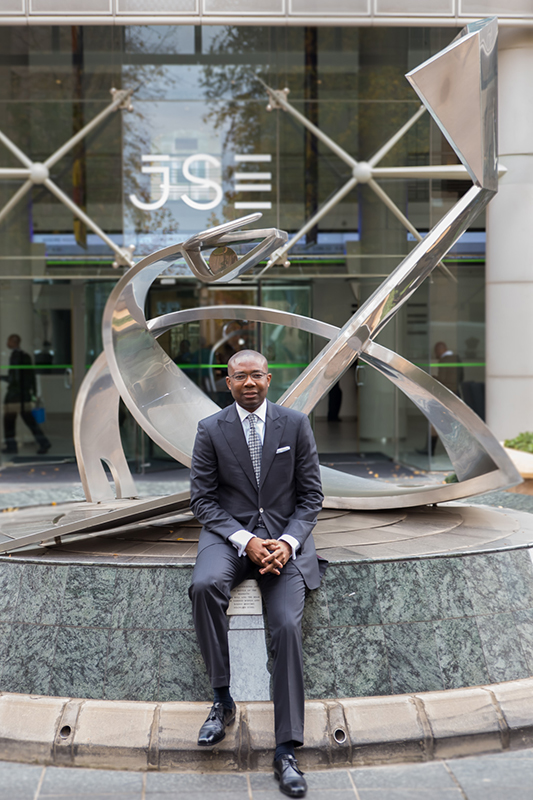
- Aigboje Aig-Imoukhuede sitting in front of JSE Building
- Born: 24 September 1966 (age 60)
- Education: University of Benin
- Occupations: Banker, lawyer, philanthropist
- Known for: Chairman, Aig-Imoukhuede Foundation; Founder, Coronation Group & Affiliates; Founder, Tengen Family Office; Former GMD and CEO, Access Bank; Chairman Access Holdings
- Board member of: Nigeria Solidarity Support Fund; GBCHealth; ABCHealth; Private Sector Health Alliance of Nigeria (PSHAN); EnterpriseNGR; Vice Chairman, Global Citizen Nigeria;
- Spouse: Ofovwe Aig-Imoukhuede
- Children: 4

Aigboje Aig-Imoukhuede FCIB, CFR (born 24 September 1966) is a Nigerian businessman, banker, investor and philanthropist.

He was the former group managing director (GMD) and chief executive officer (CEO) of Access Bank Plc. He is the founder and chairman of Coronation Group Limited and its affiliates, Coronation Asset Management Ltd and Trium Ltd. He founded Africa Initiative for Governance (AIG) in 2014. He is the co-chairman of the United Kingdom-Nigeria Capital Market Task Force and a board member of TCX Investment Management Company Netherlands. He is also chairman, the board of trustees of the Financial Market Dealers Association, and immediate past chairman of Coronation Insurance Plc (formerly Wapic).

Aigboje is also a past President of The Nigerian Stock Exchange (now Nigerian Exchange Group) where he took over from Aliko Dangote, the founding Chairman of the FMDQ OTC Exchange, Chairman of EnterpriseNGR and co-founder of Tengen Family Office. In March 2024, he returned to Access Holdings as chairman after the death of Herbert Wigwe.

== Early life and education ==
Aig-Imoukhuede was born on 24 September 1966 in Ibadan, Oyo State in Western Nigeria to parents who were in the civil service. His father, Frank Aig-Imoukhuede and mother, Historian Emily Aig-Imoukhuede (née Ihonde) had 3 other children, Erekpitan, Oluwakemi and Aigbovbioise. He hails from Sabongida-Ora, Edo State in Southern Nigeria. He lived with his family in Lagos but went to Federal Government College Kaduna, in Northern Nigeria. He earlier attended St. Saviours School (primary) in Lagos and at age 16, he enrolled to study law at University of Benin, Edo State, Nigeria. He graduated with a LLB degree in 1986 at age 19 and was called to the Nigerian Bar in 1987. He holds a Trium MBA, awarded jointly by the London School of Economics, New York University, and HEC Paris. In 2000 he attended a three-month Executive Management Programme course at Harvard Business School.

== Career ==
He began working as a lawyer with Continental Merchant Bank during his NYSC deployment in 1988. Aigboje joined Guaranty Trust Bank Plc in December 1991 where he resigned as executive director in March 2002. Aigboje Aig-Imoukhuede was the leader of the 2002 acquisition of Access Bank, then a fringe regional player. He was the group managing director and chief executive officer of the bank till December 2013. He retired as president of the Nigerian Stock Exchange in 2017, but he remains on the National Council as an ex-officio. He was a non-executive director of Africa Finance Corporation since 2008 until 2 June 2017. He has been the chairman of Associated Discount House Limited since 1 December 2011. He serves as a director of Petralon Energy and retired as the chairman of Wapic Insurance Plc where he has been its director since November 2011. Aig-Imoukhuede also served as board chairman and director of FMDQ OTC PLC until 1 August 2014. He founded Coronation Capital Limited in 2015 and has led the growth and expansion of the Coronation Ecosystem. In October 2021, Aigboje collaborated with the office of the Head of Nigerian Civil Service (OHCSF), led by Folashade Yemi-Esan to digitalize work processes and public service delivery.

== Achievements and awards ==
- He was conferred with the National Honors of Commander of the Order of the Niger (CON) in 2011 by then President Goodluck Jonathan of the Federal Republic of Nigeria, for his contributions to the development of banking and finance in Nigeria. He was also awarded the National Productivity Order of Merit Award in 2009. In 2011 he was inaugurated into the Ernst and Young World Entrepreneurs Hall of Fame as the Ernst & Young West Africa Entrepreneur of the Year, as well as the African Banker Magazine's “African Banker of the Year” in 2013. He is a member of the American Academy of Arts and Sciences and was appointed a member of the international advisory board of Oxford University's Blavasupportool of Government. He is a fellow of the African Leadership Institute affiliated with the Aspen Institute in Colorado, USA. He is also honorary fellow of the Chartered Institute of Bankers of Nigeria. In 2018, he was awarded the honorary Doctor of Science (D.Sc.) by the Olabisi Onabanjo University, Ago-Iwoye, Ogun State, Nigeria.

== Philanthropy ==
He is the founder and chairman of the Aig-Imoukhuede Foundation, an independent non-profit that seeks to transform public service delivery across Africa. The Foundation partners with Oxford University's Blavatnik School of Government, for several capacity-building initiatives for African public servants. Amongst the several capacity-building initiatives is the AIG Scholarships that send qualified African public servants to the University of Oxford for a Master of Public Policy degree. The AIG Public Leaders Programme is an asynchronous executive training for senior level public servants across Africa.

Aig-Imoukhuede is the first African co-chairman of the Global Business Coalition on Health (GBC Health) and the chairman of Friends of the Global Fund – Africa (Friends Africa). In 2010, he made a $1 million contribution to the Global Fund, and he has since made donations to the Global Fund through the 'Gift from Africa' campaign.

He is currently the chairman of ABCHealth, a regional non-profit established by the Aliko Dangote Foundation and GBCHealth. He is also a director of the Private Sector Health Alliance of Nigeria (PSHAN). In 2019, Aigboje initiated the Adopt-A-Healthcare-Facility Programme (ADHFP).

He is also the vice chairman of Global Citizen Nigeria and through a partnership with the Nigeria Sovereign Investment Fund (NSIA), has created the Nigerian Solidarity Support Fund (NSSF).

== Authorship ==
Aigboje is the author of Leaving the Tarmac: Buying a Bank in Africa (Red Door, 2020), a memoir that recounts how he and Herbert Wigwe bought Access Bank in 2002, one of the smallest and most crisis- prone banks in Nigeria, and built it into one of the biggest and strongest banks in the country.

== Personal life ==
Aigboje Aig-Imoukhuede is married to Ofovwe Aig-Imoukhuede, and together they have four children.

== Awards and Honours ==
- African Banker Lifetime Achievement Award (2024)
