= Omagwa =

Omagwa is a community in Ikwerre Local Government Area of Rivers State, Nigeria. The paramount ruler of Omagwa is HRH Eze Achinike Amadi. The Port Harcourt International and Domestic Airport is located in Omagwa town.
