= Diamond Bank =

Bank

Diamond Bank Plc.
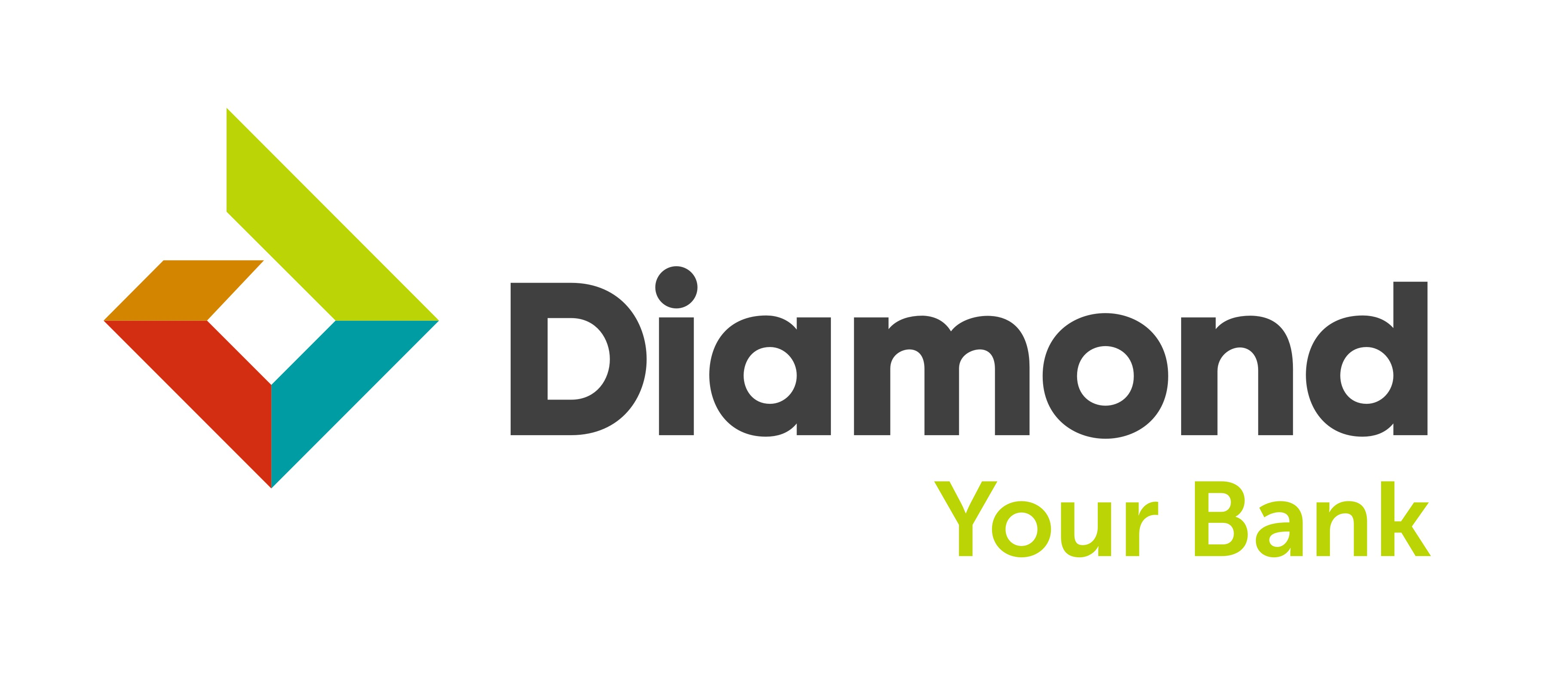
- Company type: Formerly Public limited company
- Traded as: NGX: DIAMONDBNK
- Industry: Finance
- Founded: 20 December 1990
- Founder: Pascal Dozie
- Defunct: 1 April 2019
- Fate: Merged with Access Bank Plc., 1 April 2019
- Headquarters: Victoria Island, Lagos, Lagos State, Nigeria
- Area served: Nigeria; United Kingdom
- Key people: Uzoma Dozie (CEO)
- Services: Banking; Financial services
- Revenue: ▲:Pretax: ₦28 billion (US$175 million) (FY:2012)
- Total assets: ₦1.7 trillion (US$7.3 billion) (December 2012)
- Website: diamondbank.com

Diamond Bank Plc., was a Nigerian multinational financial service provider. Diamond Bank was acquired by Access Bank in December 2018, and announced to complete the transactions of the merger fully in the first half of 2019. On 1 April 2019, Diamond Bank was fully merged with Access Bank to build a new entity while retaining the name of Access Bank with a logo that took the form of Diamond Bank.

== Overview ==
The bank provided financial services. Its headquarters was located in Lagos, Nigeria. As at June 2017, the bank operated 297 branches in Nigeria.

== See also ==
- List of banks in Nigeria
- List of banks in Africa
- Central Bank of Nigeria
- Economy of Nigeria
