= Pascal Dozie =

Nigerian businessman (1939–2025)

Pascal Gabriel Dozie
- Born: 9 April 1939; Egbu, Owerri, Colony and Protectorate of Nigeria
- Died: 8 April 2025 (aged 85)
- Education: London School of Economics
- Notable work: Founder of Diamond Bank
- Honours: National Award of the Order of the Niger (OON)

Pascal Gabriel Dozie (9 April 1939 – 8 April 2025) was a Nigerian businessman. He was the founder of Diamond Bank and the chairman of Pan-Atlantic University.

== Background ==
Dozie was born at the Egbu village of Owerri, Nigeria on 9 April 1939. He was born into the family of Charles Dozie who was a Catholic catechist. from 1964 to 1968 Dozie attended Our Lady's в 1961 School Emekuku where he obtained his First School Leaving Certificate (FSLC). He subsequently attended Holy Ghost Juniorate Seminary and Holy Ghost College, Owerri, where he obtained his West African Senior School Certificate Examination. After obtaining his high school certificate, he travelled to London where he studied economics at the London School of Economics and obtained a BSc in economics. Subsequently, he attended City University in London where he studied operational research and industrial engineering and obtained a master's degree in Administrative Science.

Dozie died on 8 April 2025 one day before his 86th birthday.

== Career ==
Pascal Dozie began his career as an economist at the National Economic Development Office in the United Kingdom. He was also a part-time lecturer at the North Western Polytechnic, London. Between 1970 and 1971 he served as a consulting economist at the African States Consulting Organisation in Uganda. In 1971 after he left his job in Uganda, he relocated to Nigeria at the request of his mother. In 1971 after his return to Nigeria, with his experience in Econometrics and Industrial Engineering he launched his first company, the African Development Consulting Group (ADCG). ADCG had worked with companies such as Nestlé and Pfizer. He was subsequently hired by Clement Isong, then Governor of the Central Bank of Nigeria, to conduct some studies on the Co-operative and Commerce Bank.

In 1985, he was appointed Chairman of Progress Bank, which is now defunct. Later that same year Dozie applied for a banking licence in order to help traders in South-Eastern Nigeria who were faced with banking problems. This brought about the birth of Diamond Bank. At its inception the share capital of the bank was ₦10 million ($28,000) with only 21 interested shareholders. In 1990, he satisfied the requirements of the Central Bank of Nigeria to operate a standard bank and in 1991 the Diamond Bank began operations. He was CEO of Diamond Bank from 1991 to 2006 when he handed over to his son Uzoma Dozie. He was the first president of the Lagos Business School Alumni Association.

Dozie was also at one time President of the Nigerian Stock Exchange. He owned shares in MTN Group and was chairman of the company. He later resigned as the chairman and was succeeded by the former NCC boss Ernest Ndukwe.

== Awards ==
- National Award of the order of the Niger (OON)
- Commander of the Order of the Niger (CON)
- AABLA (All Africa Business Leader Award)-Lifetime Achievement Award winner
