= Evelyn Oputu =

Nigerian banker

- Born: Evelyn Ndali oputa August 13, 1948 (age 78); Delta state
- Education: University of Lagos; Harvard Business School
- Occupation: Banker.
- Years active: 1976–2009

Evelyn Ndali Oputu (born August 13, 1949) is a Nigerian banker, and former managing director of The Bank of Industry.

== Early life and education ==
Oputu started her education at St. Teresa College, Ibadan in 1960 and then proceeded to Federal School of Arts and Science Lagos to obtain Senior Secondary Certificate between 1965 and 1967. She earned a B.Sc. degree in Business administration from the University of Lagos between 1972 and 1975 and later obtained a Diploma in Mass General Management at the Harvard Business School, Boston in 1987.

== Career ==
She began her banking career in 1976 with ICON Merchant Bank Ltd. and later joined International Merchant Bank (IMB) in 1982 where she operated through Treasury and Financial Division of the Capital Market, as well as the Project and Financial advisory service areas. And in 1991, she became an Executive Director, First Bank of Nigeria between 1991 and 1997 and later served as the Chief Executive Officer, Managing Director of The Bank of Industry Limited from December 2005 to April 2014.

== Awards and recognition ==
Awards include:

- Order of Nigeria by the Federal government of Nigeria
- Banker of the Year 2013 by The Sun Newspapers
- Leadership Chief Executive Officer (CEO) of the year 2012 by The Leadership Newspapers
