= Bank of Industry =

Nigerian finance institution

Bank of Industry Limited

- Bank of Industry Tower II, BOI Corporate Office, Abuja
- Type: Government Owned Corporation
- Industry: Financial Services
- Predecessor: Investment Company of Nigeria (ICON) Limited; Nigerian Bank for Commerce and Industry (NBCI); Nigerian Industrial Development Bank (NIDB) Limited
- Founded: 1959
- Headquarters: 23 Marina Street; P.M.B 12855; Lagos Island, Lagos; Lagos State; Nigeria
- Key people: Dr. Olasupo Olusi(Managing Director/CEO)
- Products: Term Loans; Working Capital Loans; Insurance Products; Trustee Services; Leasing Services; Savings
- Net income: ▼ ₦52.9bn (2022)
- Total assets: ▲ ₦2.37tn (2022)
- Number of employees: 619 (2022)
- Subsidiaries: BOI Investment Trust Company (BOI-ITC); BOI-Microfinance Bank Limited (BOI-MFB); BOI Insurance Brokers (BOI-IB) Limited; LECON Financial Services
- Rating: National Long Term Rating; Moody's: Aa3(11/2017); Fitch: AA+ (2017); Agusto & Co.: Aa (2017)
- Website: Bank of Industry

Bank of Industry Limited (abbreviated as 'BOI') is Nigeria's oldest and largest Development Finance Institution (DFI) currently operating. It is owned by the Ministry of Finance Incorporated (MOFI) Nigeria (94.80%), the Central Bank of Nigeria (CBN) (5.19%) and private shareholders (0.01%).

== History ==
Bank of Industry Limited began operations in 1959 as the Investment Corporation of Nigeria (ICON) Limited. In 1964, ICON Limited was reconstituted to become the Nigerian Industrial Development Bank (NIDB) Limited under the guidance of the World Bank. Initially, International Finance Corporation (IFC) held 75% equity in NIDB and produced the first Managing Director. However, the equity structure was diluted in 1976 as a result of the indigenization decree.

In 2001, the BOI was reconstructed out of the merger of the Nigerian Industrial Development Bank (NIDB), the Nigerian Bank for Commerce and Industry (NBCI) and, the National Economic Reconstruction Fund (NERFUND). Although the bank's share capital was initially set at ₦50 billion in the wake of NIDB's reconstruction, it was increased to ₦250 billion in 2007.

== Operations ==
The bank has been instrumental in administering the ₦300 billion Power and Aviation Intervention Fund and ₦50 billion Cotton, Textile and Garments Intervention Fund from the CBN, $200 million Nigerian Content Intervention fund (NCI Fund), ₦2.5 billion Nigerian Artisanal and Small-Scale Miners (ASM) Finance Support Fund amongst other funds.

BOI also manages and disburses the Government Enterprise and Empowerment Program (GEEP), one of a number of social intervention programmes introduced by the Federal Government of Nigeria. GEEP is a ₦140 billion fund aimed at supporting individuals in the informal sector with loans at zero percent interest rate. The microcredit scheme is made up of three programs: TraderMoni, MarketMoni and FarmerMoni. Through the fund, BOI supports trade cooperatives, women cooperatives, micro-enterprises and trade associations with loans ranging from ₦10,000 to ₦50,000. In June 2019, Bank of Industry was given the award for Financial Inclusion at the African Banker Awards ceremony which held in Malabo, Equatorial Guinea, for its role in implementing GEEP.

As part of efforts to expand financing opportunities, BOI began partnerships with several state governments under a matching fund scheme. The MSME matching fund is a 50:50 counterpart funding scheme with State Governments to administer the fund for establishing micro, small or medium scale businesses in participating states.

== Strategic Partnerships ==
=== Collaboration with Federal Ministry of Mines and Steel Development ===
In 2017, the Federal Ministry of Mines and Steel Development (FMMSD) set up a ₦2.5 billion Nigerian Artisanal and Small-Scale Miners (ASM) Finance Support Fund and designated BOI as the sole fund manager. The purpose of the ASM Fund is to address the funding requirements of artisanal and small-scale miners while promoting the development of solid minerals potentials in Nigeria. Through the scheme, artisanal miners can access up to ₦10 million while small-scale miners can access up to ₦100 million.

=== BOI-UNDP Solar Energy Programme ===
In 2011, BOI and United Nations Development Programme (UNDP) launched the Access to Renewable Energy Project. The project was set up to serve as an advocacy and awareness programme to promote and support the expansion of renewable energy services to support households and local enterprises in unserved and underserved communities. To achieve this, BOI and UNDP encouraged stakeholders in the renewable energy space to invest in the Nigerian sector. However, in 2015, the project was refocused to align with BOI's strategy to fund and implement renewable energy projects in collaboration with relevant stakeholders. As a result, the project was renamed to the Solar Energy Programme (SEP) to reflect the change in strategic direction.

The SEP commenced with a Rural Electrification Project which involved the provision of long term financing for the installation of low cost micro-grid and stand-alone solar energy solutions in nominated off-grid rural communities. Between 2015 and 2016, micro-grid and stand-alone solar energy solutions were installed in 6 off-grid rural communities in 6 Nigerian States: Niger State, Osun State, Gombe State, Anambra State, Edo State and Kaduna State. Pre-paid metres, using Pay-As-You-Go models, were installed in each household and microenterprise to accommodate for flexibility of payment and to solve challenges of unpaid bills. The pilot phase was considered a success and also attracted several potential investors across Nigeria.

On the back of this success, BOI and UNDP entered into a cost-sharing agreement to fund the second phase of the project. In 2016, BOI provided $1.4 million debt financing while UNDP provided $600,000 grant to replicate the solar energy solutions in 11 additional off-grid communities across 4 Nigerian States: Niger State, Gombe State, Anambra State and Kaduna State.

In view of the benefits of the SEP, BOI introduced a ₦2 billion Solar Energy commercial product in 2017 to be accessed by various categories of end users both directly through BOI and indirectly.

Through the Solar Energy Programme, the bank aims to power over 100,000 off-grid households and microenterprises in rural and commercial communities by 2021.

=== Collaboration with African Development Bank (AfDB) Group ===
In 2011, the Board of Directors of African Development Bank (AfDB) Group approved $500 million multi-tranche line of credit to assist BOI in financing local SMEs Nigeria. In 2015 and 2017, the bank received $100 million (in two tranches of $50 million each) to fund export-oriented SMEs with the capacity to generate foreign exchange. The line of credit would be provided for funding projects aimed at systematic poverty reduction, employment generation and wealth creation through entrepreneurial, social and economic development. As part of the agreement, AfDB required the bank provide technical assistance for capacity building for both BOI and SMEs. To this end, BOI enlisted international companies BDO/GBRW.

== Corporate Governance ==
Dr. Olasupo Olusi is the current Managing Director/CEO of Bank of Industry. He was appointed by the President of Nigeria, President Bola Tinubu, in October, 2023.

The table below lists the past Managing Director/CEOs of the Bank of Industry (in descending order):

Name	Term start	Term end
Olukayode Pitan	May 2017	October 2023
Waheed A. Olagunju (Acting)	February 2016	May 2017
Rasheed Adejare Olaoluwa	May 2014	February 2016
Waheed A. Olagunju (Acting)	April 2014	May 2014
Evelyn Oputu	December 2005	April 2014
Lawrence Osa-Afiana	December 2001	December 2005

== Branches ==
The Bank of Industry has 31 offices across Nigeria, a headquarters in Lagos State, Nigeria and a corporate office in Abuja, Nigeria. The offices are located in the following states:

- Abia State
- Abuja, Federal Capital Territory
- Adamawa State
- Akwa Ibom State
- Anambra State
- Bauchi State
- Benue State
- Borno State
- Cross River State
- Delta State
- Ebonyi State
- Edo State
- Ekiti State
- Enugu State
- Gombe State
- Kaduna State
- Kano State
- Katsina State
- Kebbi State
- Kwara State
- Lagos State
- Nasarrawa State
- Niger State
- Ogun State
- Ondo State
- Osun State
- Oyo State
- Plateau State
- Rivers State
- Sokoto State
- Taraba State

== Subsidiaries ==
=== BOI-Investment Trust Company (BOI-ITC) ===
BOI Investment and Trust Company Limited (BOI-ITC) was established in 1978 as a wholly owned subsidiary of BOI's predecessor, Nigerian Industrial Development Bank (NIDB). It was set up as a capital market operator to function as a trustee, registrar and fund/portfolio manager. The company is also registered with the CBN as a finance company. As a Trustee, BOI-ITC is engaged in the specialised business of trust services including private and public trust, employment retirement benefits, trust fund management for both private and corporate bodies, estate administration under trust, and executorships among other related services.

=== BOI-Microfinance Bank Limited (BOI-MFB) ===
The BOI-Microfinance Bank Limited is a limited liability company duly incorporated in Nigeria under the 2002 Companies and Allied Matters Act and regulated by CBN. The bank offers a broad range of financial services to micro, small and medium-sized enterprises and various low-income earners both as individuals and as groups. It offers asset financing loans, working capital loans, consumer loans and group loan which do not exceed ₦500,000 per enterprise. In addition, BOI-MFB aims to encourage savings among the unbanked productive poor of the Nigerian society.

BOI-MFB is a major vehicle in delivering on the objectives of the BOI Bottom of the Pyramid Scheme (BOP).

=== BOI Insurance Brokers (BOI-IB) Limited ===
BOI Industrial and Development Insurance Brokers (BOI-IB) Limited offers insurance and consultancy services. BOI-IB Limited provides organisations with fire/extraneous perils insurance, burglary/housebreaking insurance, consequential loss, machinery breakdown, money insurance, goods in transit, group personal accident, public liability, fidelity guarantee, marine insurance and automobile (motor) insurance.

BOI-IB limited also provides insurance cover for BOI loans and services.

=== LECON Financial Services ===
LECON Financial Services, formerly Leasing Company of Nigeria Limited, was established as a wholly owned subsidiary of Bank of Industry Limited (BOI), formerly Nigerian Industrial Development Bank Limited, (NIDB) in 1989. It was set up to augment the activities of BOI by providing ancillary facilities to loan beneficiaries of the bank.

== See also ==
- List of national development banks
