= Isiokpo =

Isiokpo is an ancient town in Ikwerre Local Government Area of Rivers State, Nigeria.

It is the capital of the Ikwerre Local Government Area. And it is the ancient Kingdom of Ikwerre land.

The town is bordered by Omagwa on the South and Uvuawhu on the North of Rivers State.

Isiokpo people are majorly farmers who engaged in the cultivation of food mostly cassava and yam.

One of the festivals of the Isiokpo people is the Bicycle festival. This festival is celebrated by the people of the town who come out in mass riding on bicycles to depict their culture in beautifully dressed ankara and cultural wears round the town. Bicycles have been one of the major means of convening farm produce for the Isiokpo people of Rivers State.

== Climate ==
In Isiokpo, the wet season is overcast and warm, the dry season is hot and mostly cloudy, and it is oppressive year round.
