= Access Bank plc =

Nigerian multinational bank

Access Bank PLC
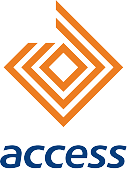
- Type: Public
- Traded as: NGX: ACCESSCORP
- Industry: Banking
- Founded: 1989
- Headquarters: 14/15, Prince Alaba Abiodun Oniru Road, Victoria Island, Lagos, Lagos State, Nigeria
- Key people: Mr Paul Usoro SAN, Chairman
- Products: Loans, Credit Cards, Savings, Investments, Mortgages
- Revenue: ▲US$1,419 billion (NGN:514 billion) (Sept 2019)
- Total assets: US $25.5 billion (NGN: 10.055 trillion) (2021)
- Number of employees: 28,121
- Website: www.accessbankplc.com

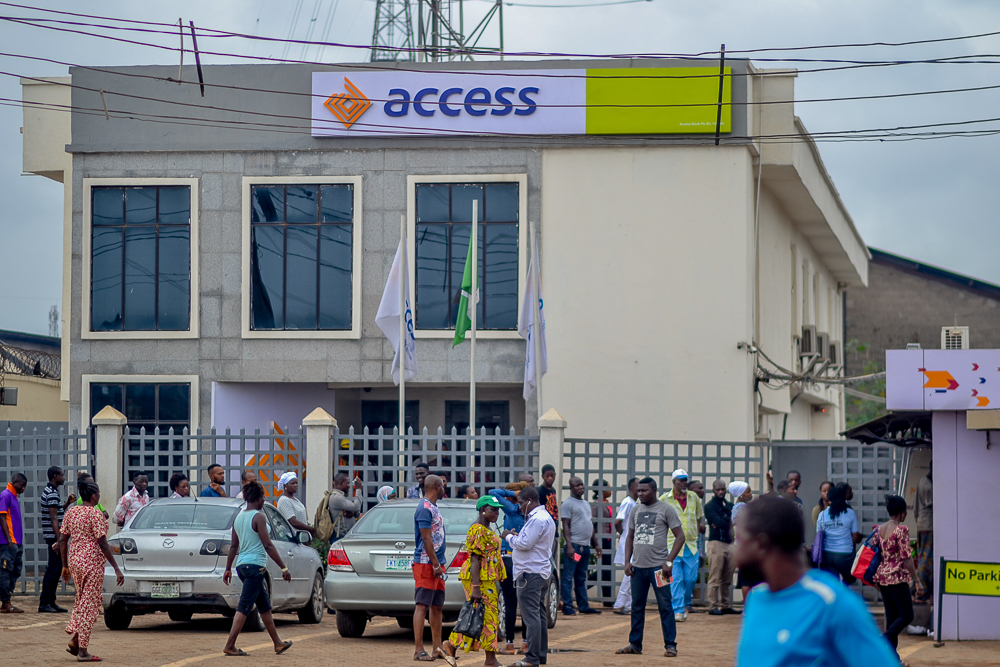
Access Bank branch at Kola bus stop, opposite AIT road, Alagbado, Lagos.

Access Bank Plc, commonly known as Access Bank, is a Nigerian multinational commercial bank, owned by Access Bank Group. It is licensed by the Central Bank of Nigeria, the national banking regulator.

Originally a corporate bank, they expanded into personal and business banking in 2012. Access Bank and Diamond Bank merged on 1 April 2019. In conclusion of its merger with Diamond Bank, Access Bank unveiled its new logo, signalling the commencement of a new enlarged banking entity. The bank employs more than 28,000 people in 2021.

After the merger, with more than 52 million customers, Access Bank became the largest bank in Africa by customer base, and the largest bank in Nigeria by assets.

== Access Bank Group ==
As of September 2021, in addition to Nigeria, Access Bank plc has subsidiaries in Mozambique, Zambia, Congo, Sierra Leone, Rwanda, Gambia, Ghana, Kenya, South Africa, and in the United Kingdom. Access Bank Group also maintains representative offices in China, India, Lebanon and United Arab Emirates.

== Overview ==
Access Bank plc is a large financial-services provider. In June 2021, the bank had an asset base in excess of US $25,5 billion (NGN: 10,055 trillion), and shareholders' equity valued at approximately US$1.87 billion (NGN: 775 billion). ^{(Note that US $1.00 = NGN 413 on 1 November 2021.)}

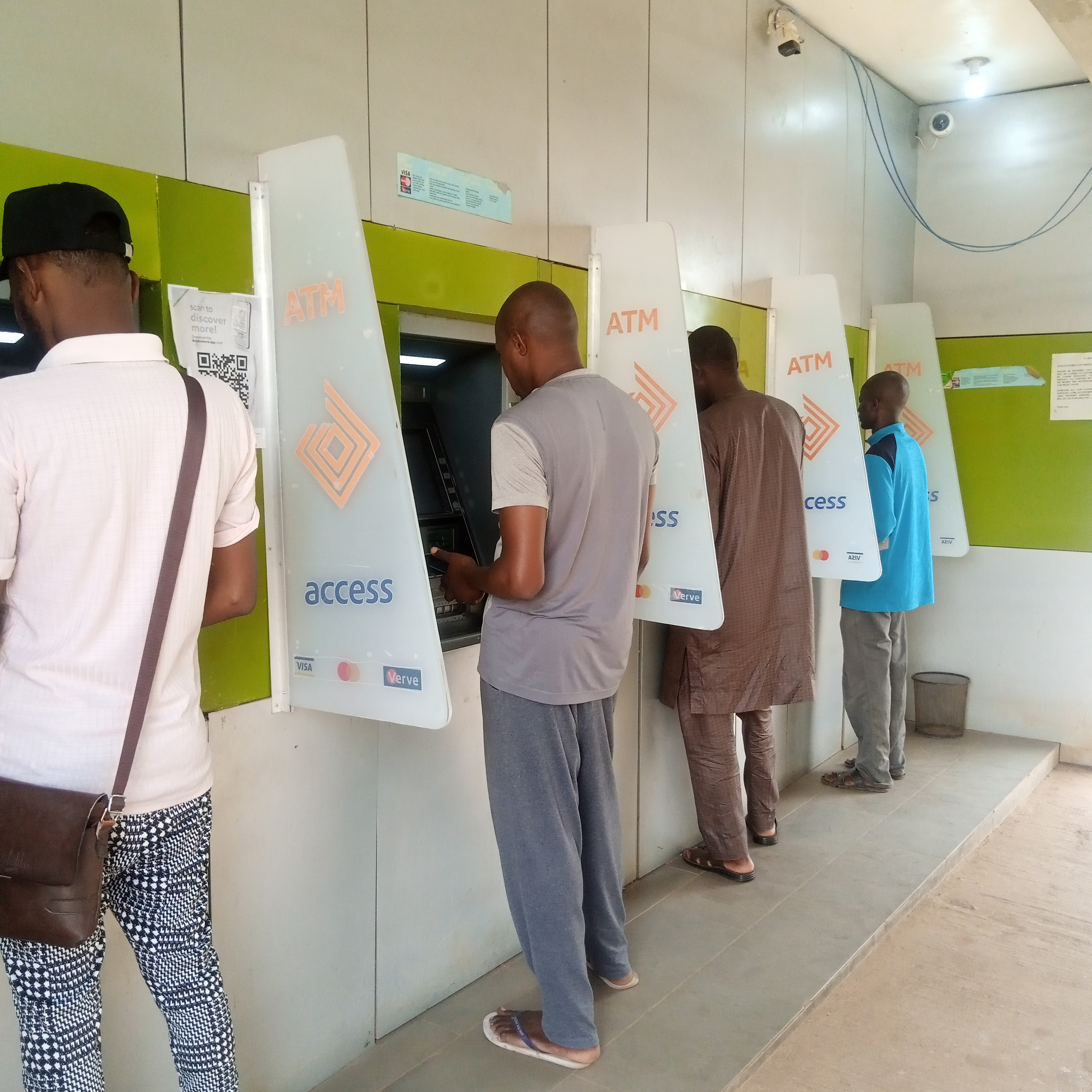
Customers of Access Bank Plc withdrawing Money in Nigeria.

== History ==
The bank received its license from the Central Bank of Nigeria in 1989, and listed on the Nigerian Stock Exchange in 1998.

- 2002: Access Bank was taken over by a core of new management led by Aigboje Aig-Imoukhuede and Herbert Wigwe.
- 2005: Access Bank acquired Marina Bank and Capital Bank (formerly commercial bank Crédit Lyonnais Nigeria) by merger.
- 2007: Access Bank established a subsidiary in Banjul, The Gambia. This bank now has a head office and four branches, and the bank has pledged to open another four branches.
- 2008: Access Bank acquired 88% of the shares of Omnifinance Bank, which was established in 1996. It also acquired 90% of Banque Privée du Congo, which South African investors had established in 2002. Access Bank acquired 75% of the shares of Bancor SA, in Rwanda. Bancor had been established in 1995 and reorganized in 2001. In September, Access Bank opened a subsidiary in Freetown, Sierra Leone, and then in October, the bank opened subsidiaries in Lusaka, Zambia and in London, United Kingdom.
- 2008: Finbank (Burundi) joined the Access Bank network, but exited the group in 2014.
- 2011: Access Bank was in talks with the Central Bank of Nigeria to acquire Intercontinental Bank plc.
- Intercontinental Bank became a subsidiary of Access Bank plc, which recapitalized the former and acquired a 75% majority interest in its stock.
- The combined effect of the restoration of Net Asset Value (NAV) to zero by AMCON and N50billion capital injection by Access Bank plc is that Intercontinental Bank now operates as a well-capitalized bank, with shareholders funds of N50billion and Capital Adequacy Ratio (CAR) of 24%, well above the 10% regulatory threshold.
- January 2012: Access Bank announced the conclusion of its acquisition of the former Intercontinental Bank, creating an expanded Access Bank, one of the largest four commercial banks in Nigeria with over 5.7 million customers, 309 branches and over 1,600 Automated Teller Machines (ATMs).
- 2012: The London High Court indicted former Managing Director of Intercontinental Bank Erastus Akingbola to refund over $1 billion to Access Bank.
- 2018: In December 2018, Access Bank PLC acquires Diamond Bank, the board of Diamond Bank announces that her merger with Access Bank Plc expected to be completed in first half of 2019.
- 2020: Access Bank acquires Kenya’s Transnational Bank, including 100 percent of shareholding and 28 branches around Kenya.
- 2020: In October, Access Bank receives regulatory approval to establish Access Bank Mozambique. Plans were also announced of the Group transforming into a Holding Company and entering South Africa.

== Locations ==
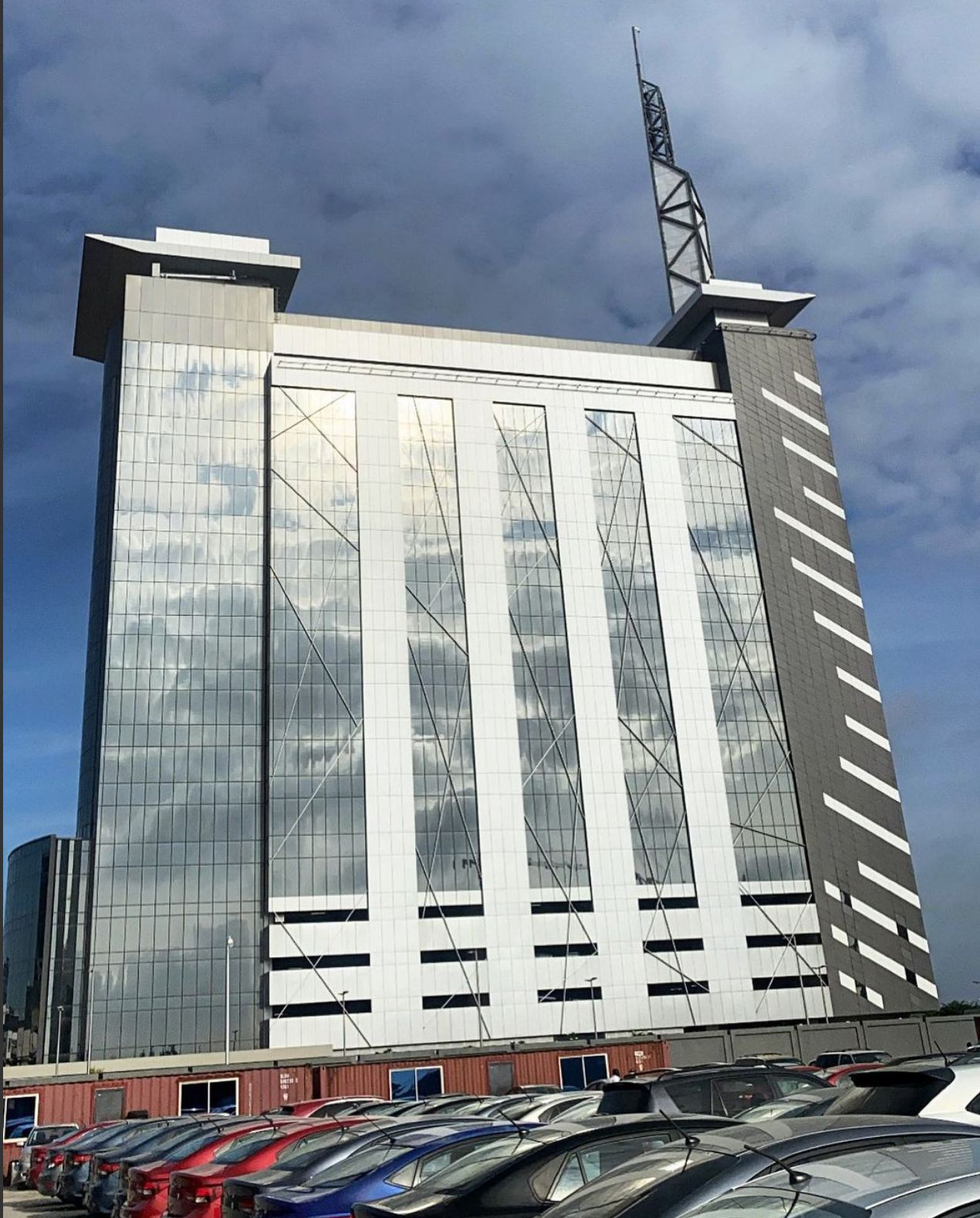
Access Tower, 14/15, Prince Alaba Oniru Road, Oniru, Lagos, Nigeria.

The bank's headquarters is located at 14/15, Prince Alaba Abiodun Oniru Road, Victoria Island, Lagos, Lagos State, Nigeria in the city of Lagos, the most commercial city of Nigeria. The coordinates of the bank's headquarters are: 6.4333751, 3.4453135.

== CSR ==
In October 2024, the bank launched a platform called The Power of 100 Africa initiative to celebrate women across Africa who have blazed trails in education, business, technology, healthcare, social work and other important sectors of the economy.

== Awards ==
It was named the Consumer Finance Product of the Year in 2024 by the Middle East & Africa Retail Banking Innovation Awards.

It was also named the Nigeria's Best Bank in 2024 by the Euromoney Awards.

== See also ==
- List of banks in Nigeria
- Access Bank Group
- Intercontinental Bank
