= Nipton, California =

Unincorporated community in California, United States

- Unincorporated community
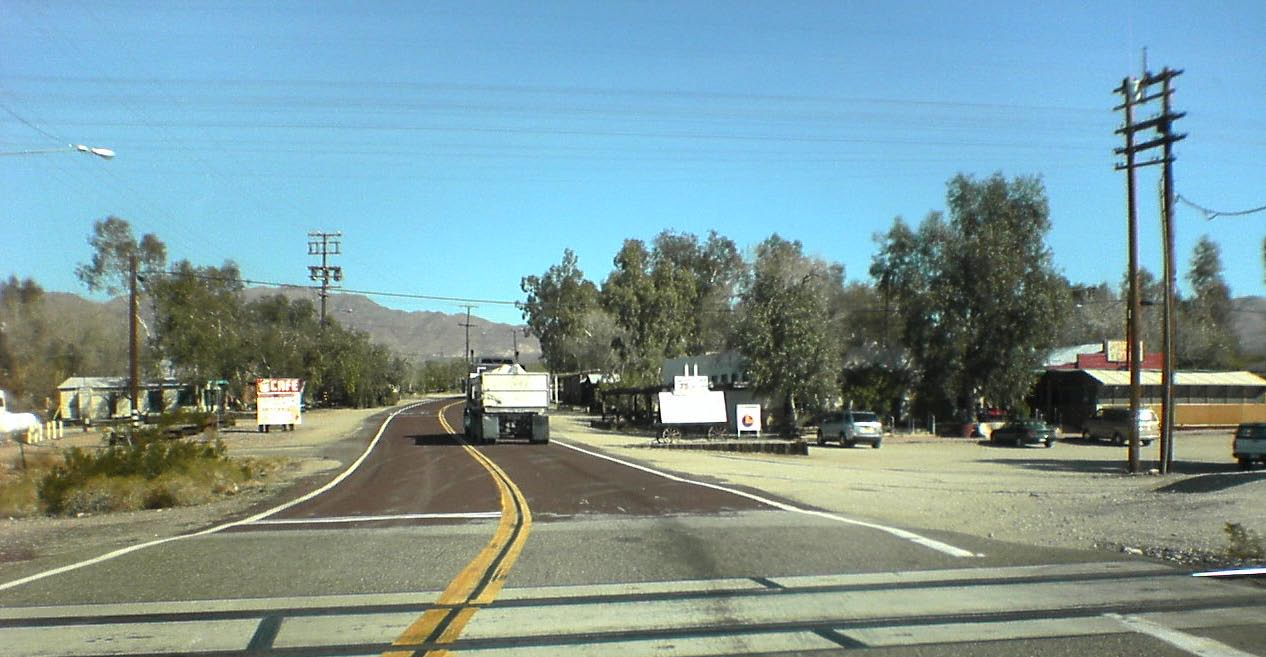
- Nipton in 2006

- Location within the State of California
- Coordinates: 35°28′0″N 115°16′20″W
- Country: United States
- State: California
- County: San Bernardino
- town: 1905
- Elevation: 3,032 ft (924 m)
- Time zone: UTC-8 (Pacific)
  - Summer (DST): UTC-7 (PDT)
- ZIP codes: 92364
- Area codes: 442/760
- FIPS code: 06-51490
- GNIS feature ID: 246562

Nipton is an unincorporated community in the Ivanpah Valley in San Bernardino County, California, United States. With a population of about 15 – 20, it is located on the northeastern border of Mojave National Preserve, approximately 12 miles (19 km) southeast of Primm, Nevada and the Ivanpah Solar Power Facility. It is accessible via Nevada State Route 164 (also known as Nipton Road).

== History ==
A mining camp was established here at the crossroads of two wagon trails. The town was founded on February 9, 1905, with the coming of the first train on the newly constructed San Pedro, Los Angeles & Salt Lake Railroad. It was called "Nippeno Camp" following a nearby discovery of gold. The name was changed to Nipton when the San Pedro, Los Angeles & Salt Lake Railroad merged with the Union Pacific Railroad around 1910. In addition to being a cattle-loading station for several local ranches, the town and depot also supplied numerous mines in the area, becoming a social center for the sparse population of the region.

On April 10, 1940, President Roosevelt approved transferring title of Nipton to Harry Trehearne under the Homestead Act. It stayed in the family’s hands until 1956, when it passed to six owners.

In 1985 Gerald "Jerry" Freeman and Roxanne Lang purchased Nipton for about $200,000. They restored the cafe and five-room hotel and planted a grove of eucalyptus trees. When Freeman's health deteriorated in 2016, they put the town up for sale.

In September 2017, Nipton was purchased by American Green Inc., for US$5 million with plans to turn the town into a cannabis tourism destination. The CEO of the company hoped to make this into the first "Pot Town, USA". American Green Inc. sold the town in March 2018 after failing to attract the capital investment necessary to continue the project. The town was sold to Delta International Oil & Gas for a total of $7.7 million in debt assumption and Delta preferred stock, along with a provision that it continue with the project to transform the 80-acre (32 ha) town on the edge of the Mojave Desert into a cannabis-themed resort. The town was listed for sale again in November 2020 for $2.75 million.

In January 2023, Nipton was purchased by Spiegelworld, an American theater company, for $2.5 million. Spiegelworld has stated that Nipton will become their new base of operations and will become a place "where Spiegelworld artists and performers will retreat to dream, create and undertake unfettered artistic experimentation."

== Townsite ==
A five-room adobe hotel was built in the Mexican Territorial style in 1910. The town also has a general store, a trading post, the Whistle Stop Cafe, a RV park, five eco-cabins, and tent sites. There is also a historic schoolhouse and art exhibits connected to the Burning Man event.

== Climate ==
The area receives significant sunshine year round due to its stable descending air and high pressure. According to the Köppen Climate Classification system, Nipton has a hot desert climate, abbreviated "Bwh" on climate maps.

== In popular culture ==
Nipton appears in the 2010 video game Fallout: New Vegas as a town burned and ransacked by the in-game Caesar's Legion faction. It is also mentioned in the Dungeon Crawler Carl series by Matt Dinniman, specifically in the 2022 book "The Butcher's Masquerade", as a settlement claimed and named by Carl in the Hunting Grounds.
