= Franciscan Missionaries of the Eternal Word =

Catholic clerical association in Alabama

- Missionarii Franciscani Verbi Aeterni
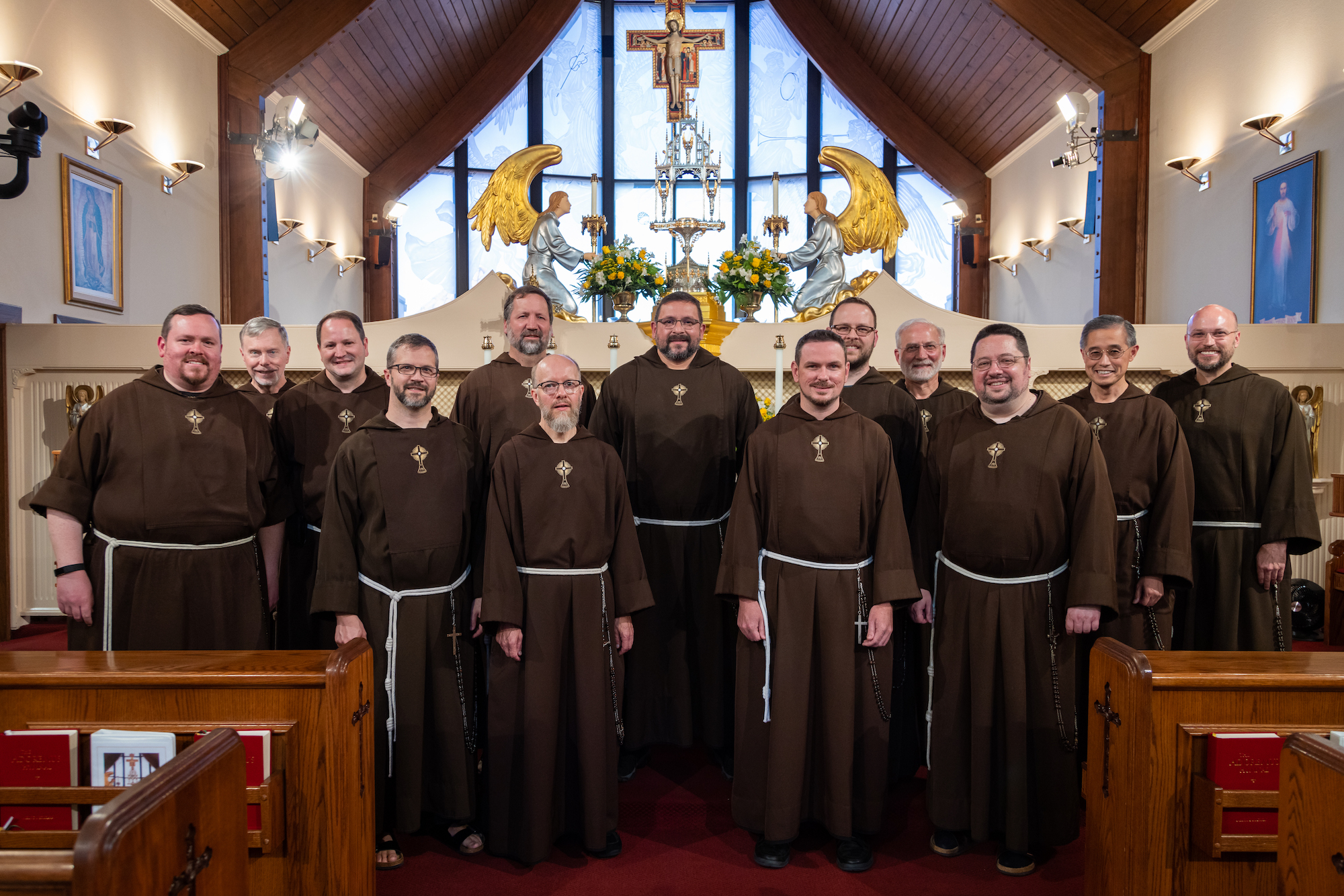
- Group picture, 2022
- Abbreviation: MFVA
- Formation: c. AD 1987; 39 years ago
- Type: Catholic religious order
- Headquarters: 5817-5821 Old Leeds Road, Irondale, Alabama, USA
- Website: franciscanmissionaries.com

The Franciscan Missionaries of the Eternal Word (MFVA; Latin: Missionarii Franciscani Verbi Aeterni) is a public clerical association of the faithful, located in the Roman Catholic Diocese of Birmingham in Alabama. They were founded in 1987 by Mother Angelica, who also founded the Eternal Word Television Network (EWTN) and the Shrine of the Most Blessed Sacrament in Hanceville, Alabama.

The primary residence of the Friars is in Irondale, Alabama, and is next door to EWTN. They also have a residence in Hanceville, AL, near the Shrine of the Most Blessed Sacrament.

The Friars' apostolate is to communicate the Catholic faith by word and example. It involves using the media: television, radio and the Internet, as well as publishing and conducting retreats. Currently, they focus their attention on the television and radio ministry, in addition to providing for the spiritual needs of the Poor Clares of Perpetual Adoration, the EWTN employees, and the visitors who come to EWTN and the Shrine.

In contrast to Franciscan communities that focus on the corporal works of mercy, the Franciscan Missionaries of the Eternal Word devote themselves to the spiritual works of mercy. Therefore, they study to gain a deep knowledge of the Catholic faith and practice communicating it effectively.

Adapting to the needs of the time, they have developed into an active religious institute, but still maintain elements of the contemplative life. In addition to praying the Liturgy of the Hours, the Friars devote an hour each day to Eucharistic Adoration and pray the daily Rosary.

The community is composed of priests and seminarians, as well as consecrated brothers.

== Friar Communities ==
=== Priests ===
- Fr. Leonard Mary, Community Servant (Superior)
- Fr. Patrick Mary, Community Vicar
- Fr. Anthony Mary, Council Member
- Fr. Mark Mary, Council Member
- Fr. Dominic Mary, Council Member
- Fr. Paschal Mary, Council Member
- Fr. Joseph Mary
- Fr. Miguel Marie
- Fr. John Paul Mary
- Fr. Matthew Mary

=== Brothers ===
- Br. Bernard Mary
- Br. Leo Mary
- Br. John Therese Marie
- Br. Pier Giorgio Maria
