= Our Lady of Solitude Monastery =

Catholic monastery in Tonopah, Arizona

- Location within Arizona
- Interactive map of Our Lady of Solitude Monastery

Monastery information
- Order: Poor Clares of Perpetual Adoration
- Established: 2005
- Mother house: Shrine of the Most Blessed Sacrament
- Diocese: Roman Catholic Diocese of Phoenix
- Controlled churches: Our Lady of Solitude Chapel

People
- Abbess: Mother Marie Andre, PCPA

Site
- Location: Tonopah, Arizona
- Coordinates: 33°34′5″N 112°52′25″W
- Other information: Patron Saint is Clare of Assisi

Our Lady of Solitude Monastery is a Catholic foundation in the United States.

It was founded in May 2005 by Mother Angelica, who also founded Eternal Word Television Network and built the Shrine of the Most Blessed Sacrament in Hanceville, Alabama. The monastery is located about one hour west of downtown Phoenix, in the rural desert and farming community of Tonopah, Arizona. It is located within the territory of the Roman Catholic Diocese of Phoenix but is not subject to it.

Our Lady of Solitude Monastery sprang from the order of Poor Clares of Perpetual Adoration, one of many branches of the Poor Clares, founded by Saint Clare of Assisi. They are a contemplative order of nuns in the Franciscan tradition, founded in France in 1854 by Marie Claire Bouillevaux. The nuns have dedicated themselves to their main apostolate of Perpetual Adoration of the Blessed Sacrament in a spirit of reparative thanksgiving. They pray especially for Catholic priests.
