= Bill Steltemeier =

American lawyer

- Portrait of Bill Steltemeier
- Born: Rudolph William Steltemeier, Jr. June 6, 1929; Nashville, Tennessee
- Died: February 15, 2013 (aged 83); Hanceville, Alabama
- Occupations: Television executive, deacon, lawyer

Rudolph William "Bill" Steltemeier, Jr. (June 6, 1929 – February 15, 2013) was an American television executive, Roman Catholic deacon, and lawyer. Steltemeier was the founding president of the Eternal Word Television Network (EWTN) from 1980 (just before the network's 1981 premiere) until 2000. He was the CEO of EWTN from 2000 to 2009. Steltemeier remained the chairman of EWTN from 2000 until his death in February 2013.

== Biography ==
He was born to Rudolph William Steltemeier, Sr., and Mary Ione Steltemeier, in Nashville, Tennessee, in 1929. He attended Chaminade College Preparatory School in St. Louis, Missouri. Steltemeier received his bachelor's degree from Vanderbilt University. In 1954, Steltemeier graduated from Vanderbilt University Law School. He enlisted in the United States Army after law school and served in France for two years.

He co-founded Steltemeier & Westbrook - originally Brown & Steltemeier - a Tennessee law firm which specializes in commercial law and bankruptcy law, in 1960. Steltemeier was a member of the boards of directors for 7-Step Foundation, Operation Comeback, and the Dismas House, which advocates for the rehabilitation of prison inmates. He also co-established a Junior Chamber of Commerce for younger prisoners. Bishop Joseph Durick ordained him as a permanent deacon for the Roman Catholic Diocese of Nashville on April 26, 1975. Steltemeier was one of the first Roman Catholic permanent deacons to be ordained in the United States.

Steltemeier first met Mother Angelica, a Franciscan nun who would later found Eternal Word Television Network (EWTN), while attending a 1978 legal convention in Chicago. The two would form a close professional and personal relationship. Mother Angelica established EWTN in 1980 and appointed Steltemeier as the network's founding President and first member of the board of directors. EWTN began broadcasting from a small studio in Irondale, Alabama, on August 15, 1981. Steltemeier commuted from his home in Nashville to the studio for twenty-two years as the Catholic network expanded nationwide.

Mother Angelica retired from the day-to-day operations of EWTN in March 2000 due to ongoing health problems. Upon her retirement, Steltemeier was elevated from president to the television network's chairman of the board and Chief Executive Officer (CEO). Bill Steltemeier stepped down as CEO in 2009, but remained the Chairman of EWTN until his death in February 2013.

In October 2009, Deacon Steltemeier and Mother Angelica were awarded the papal medal Pro Ecclesia et Pontifice by Pope Benedict XVI for their service to the Catholic Church. He was also a Knight of Malta and a Knight of the Holy Sepulcher of Jerusalem.

== Death ==
Bill Steltemeier died at home in Hanceville, Alabama, on February 15, 2013, at the age of 83. He was survived by his wife, the former Ramona Schnupp, whom he married in 1953. He was preceded in death by their son Rudy Steltemeier III, and daughter-in-law, Debra Steltemeier. His funeral was held at the Shrine of the Most Blessed Sacrament in Hanceville. He was buried at Calvary Cemetery in Nashville.
