= Divino Niño =

Catholic advocation and religious image of the Child Jesus

El Divino Niño Divine Child Jesus
- Location: Bogota, Colombia
- Date: 1940s, 1995
- Witness: Father Giovanni Rizzo; Rita Antoinette Rizzo (also known as Mother Angelica)
- Type: Jesus apparition
- Approval: Approved by Archdiocese of Bogotá; Archdiocese of Mobile, Alabama
- Shrine: Sanctuary of the Divino Niño de Jesus, Bogotá, Colombia; Shrine of the Most Blessed Sacrament, Alabama
- Patronage: Healing, blessings

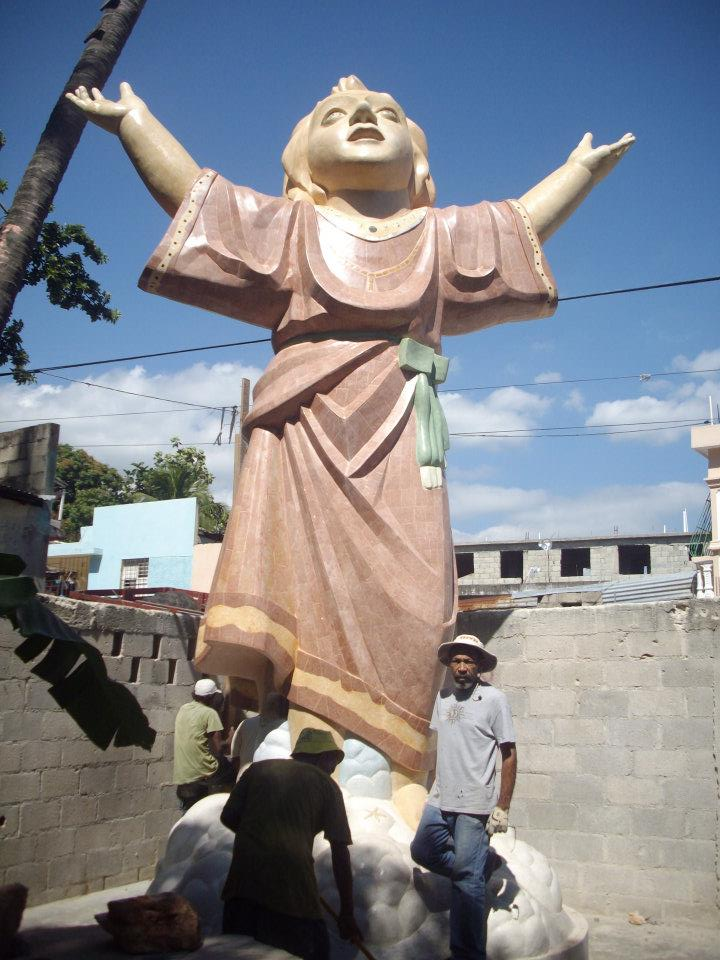
A massive reproduction of El Divino Niño in the Dominican Republic.

The Divino Niño, also known as Divino Niño de Bogotá or Divine Child Jesus, is a 20th-century religious wooden statue of the child Jesus originating from Bogota, Colombia. A cross originally in the back was removed upon purchase by Father Giovanni Rizzo. The 17-centimeter high statue with arms stretched out wide and wearing a traditional pink robe or tunic has an inscription "Yo reinaré" ("I will reign") at its base. It is one of the most popular religious images in Colombia, especially among Catholics and it is claimed to have miraculous powers of fertility and healing.

== History ==
The statue's image and religious devotion began with a Salesian priest named Father Giovanni Rizzo (Anglicized: John Rizzo), from Arenzano, Italy. His bishop once assigned him to an impoverished town or barrio in Bogotá, Colombia.

In 1914, Rizzo and his Salesian priestly companions were building a new church in Barranquilla, Colombia. With limited financial resources, Rizzo is believed to have had a mystical vision of the child Jesus in a standing posture while beckoning out his arms. The boy in the vision spoke "Take me with you, I want to accompany you."

== The statue ==
In 1942, after years of finishing church construction, Rizzo discovered a child Jesus statue in a nearby shop called El Vaticano. In the shop was the statue by an anonymous Italian sculptor who fashioned a likeness of the child Jesus with a cross in the back, as in Rizzo's vision. Rizzo ordered the cross to be removed from his back and that the owner inscribe the words Yo reinaré (English: I will reign) at the base of the statue, which he brought to his new parish, where he began to preach about the favors the Christ Child does for those who have faith and who help the poor.

== Apparition to Mother Angelica ==
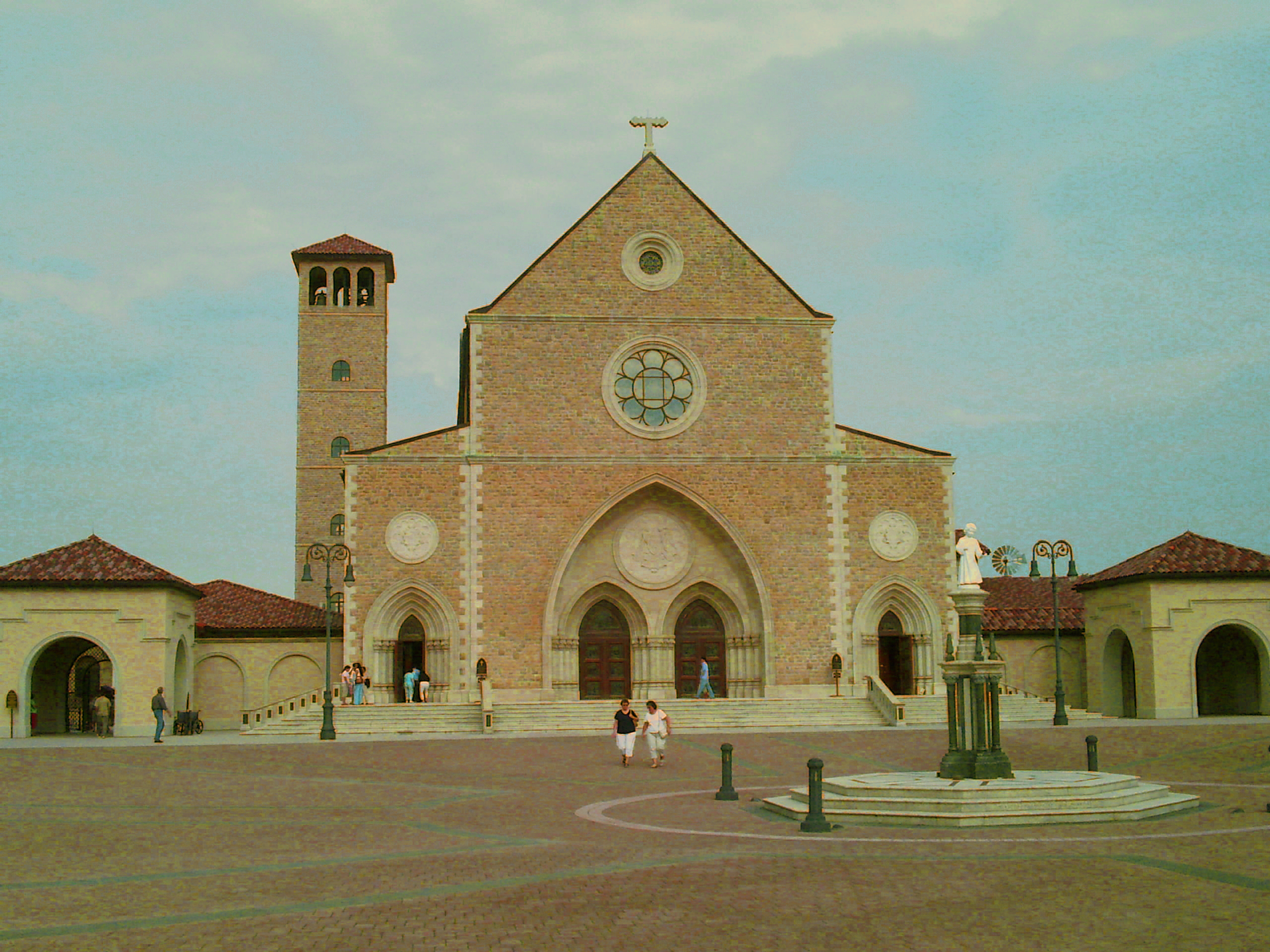
Shrine of the Most Blessed Sacrament, Hanceville, Alabama where a statue of the Divine Child of Mother Angelica's version is prominently displayed in the plaza square.

Foundress of Eternal World Television Network, Mother Angelica had a strong devotion to the Child Jesus. Various religious reports claim that in 1995, she travelled in Colombia to expand their evangelizing work of her then-new network in the Spanish language.

In Colombia, Angelica met Padre Juan Pablo Rodríguez, who introduced her and her companion sisters to the Shrine of the Divino Niño. Angelica recalled that upon praying before the image, the statue came alive and spoke to her, commanding her to build a temple where he will bless her benefactors. In a later biography by Raymond Arroyo, Angelica recalls that she has brief conversations with the Child Jesus and has also seen him in the hallway of her convent.

Mother Angelica brought this devotion back with her to Alabama, where she and her companion sisters propagate the devotion. Their variant of the Divino Niño image portrays him holding his burning heart, rather than with the traditional outstretched arms found in Bogotá. Angelica also attributes her many network and television successes to this pious religious devotion.

On her visit to Colombia, Angelica noted how she shared the same last name as the founder of the devotion, Salesian Father John Rizzo. Mother Angelica's birth name was Rita Antoinette Rizzo.

== See also ==
- Child Jesus
- Santo Niño
- Infant Jesus of Prague
- Santo Nino de Atocha
- Santo Nino de Cebu
- Mary Help of Christians
