= Rhoda Wise =

American stigmatist (1888–1948)

Servant of God Rhoda Wise
- Born: February 22, 1888; Cadiz, Ohio, United States
- Died: July 7, 1948 (aged 60); Canton, Ohio, United States
- Resting place: St. Peter's Cemetery, Canton, Ohio, United States

Rhoda Greer Wise (February 22, 1888 – July 7, 1948) was an American Catholic stigmatist and mystic from Canton, Ohio (originally in the Diocese of Cleveland and now part of the Diocese of Youngstown). Between 1939 and her death in 1948, Wise reported seeing regular visions of Jesus Christ and Saint Thérèse of Lisieux in her Canton home. Wise has been associated with a number of sudden and unexplained healings, including the healing of Mother Angelica, the founder of the Catholic television network EWTN, from a painful stomach ailment. In 2016, Bishop George V. Murry of the Diocese of Youngstown declared Wise a Servant of God.

== Life ==
Rhoda Greer was born on February 22, 1888, in Cadiz, Ohio, to bricklayer Eli Greer and his wife Anna, the sixth of their eight children. When she was two years old, the Greer family moved to Wheeling, West Virginia, where she was raised as a member of the Christian Church (Disciples of Christ), also known as the First Christian Church. In 1915, she married Ernest Wissmar and moved with him to Canton, Ohio, where Wissmar suddenly died of a cerebral hemorrhage six months later. She then married George Wise in 1917, and the couple continued to live in the Canton area and adopted two daughters, one of whom died in infancy. George Wise was an alcoholic and changed jobs frequently, resulting in financial hardship and embarrassment for the family. The Wise family lived at seven different addresses; by the early 1930s, they were occupying a three-room "depression shack" house near the Canton city dump.

Beginning in the early 1930s, Rhoda Wise developed serious health problems, including a 39-pound ovarian cyst that had to be surgically removed, and a broken foot which failed to heal properly and caused her to suffer pain and difficulty in walking. She was hospitalized frequently and underwent a number of operations for abdominal and foot problems. In late 1933 she was briefly committed to the state mental hospital by her husband, where she was diagnosed with post-operative psychosis stemming from her surgeries. She spent two separate periods of fourteen days in the mental hospital before being discharged when her condition improved. During a 1936 stay at a Canton hospital operated by the Sisters of Charity of St. Augustine, Wise befriended some of the sisters, who taught her to pray the Rosary and told her about Saint Thérèse of Lisieux. Wise began to ask for the intercession of Saint Thérèse, and also became devoted to the Sacred Heart of Jesus. In December 1938, Wise decided to convert to Catholicism, and was received into the Catholic Church in January 1939.

In May 1939, Wise was diagnosed with incurable stomach cancer, discharged from the hospital and sent home to die. According to Wise, she experienced an apparition of Jesus Christ on May 28, 1939, at her home, during which Jesus told her that he would come again with Saint Thérèse the following month on June 28. Wise reported that Jesus and Saint Thérèse both appeared on June 28, and during their visit, cured Wise of her stomach cancer, including healing a large open wound on her abdomen caused by her multiple surgeries, from which her bowel had been protruding. Wise further reported that in August 1939, Saint Thérèse miraculously healed her injured foot, causing the heavy cast then on it to split and fall off in the process.

From 1939 to 1948, Wise said that she experienced regular apparitions of Jesus and Saint Thérèse, including a visit by Saint Thérèse on January 2, the saint's birthday, every year. Wise's reported visions totaled 28 at the time of her death in 1948. Wise was inspired by these visions to offer herself as a victim soul to save the souls of others, particularly priests and members of religious orders. On Good Friday, April 3, 1942, bleeding stigmata appeared on Wise's forehead and continued to appear and bleed at intervals over the next two years. In 1943, bleeding stigmata appeared on her hands and feet as well as her forehead. The bleeding stigmata were witnessed by many visitors to the Wise home. In her final apparition of Jesus, on June 28, 1948, Wise said that Jesus asked her to say the Rosary daily for the Conversion of Russia.

The stories of Wise's experiences spread, causing hundreds of people to write to Wise and visit her home seeking physical healing and other spiritual help. Large crowds also gathered outside the Wise home on nights when Wise said that she was expecting an apparition. Many people credited Wise with miraculous cures after they had visited her home or received holy water from her home, and she developed a reputation as a "miracle woman". In 1943, Rita Rizzo, a Canton teenager who later became known as Mother Angelica, was taken to see Wise by her mother, seeking a cure for Rizzo's painful chronic stomach ailment. Mother Angelica later recounted how Wise led the doubting and ailing Rizzo in a novena to Saint Thérèse. At the end of nine days of prayer, Rizzo's stomach condition suddenly disappeared. She eventually became a nun under Wise's mentorship.

After suffering a stroke in early July 1948, Wise died of hypertension on July 7, 1948, in her Canton home. During the two days prior to her funeral, over 14,000 people reportedly visited her bier. Religious pilgrims, many from outside Ohio, continued to visit the Wise home even after her death and credit her with miraculous cures.

== Possible canonization ==
In November 2012, the Diocese of Youngstown began to conduct an informal investigation into the life and writings of Rhoda Wise to determine if she might be a candidate for sainthood in the Roman Catholic Church. Following this investigation, in 2016, Bishop George V. Murry of the Diocese of Youngstown declared Wise a Servant of God, the first step on the path to sainthood. A formal Diocesan inquiry was launched to determine whether she may be beatified and ultimately canonized as a saint. In July 2018, the results of the Diocesan investigation were submitted to the Vatican. In late November 2018, Bishop Murry along with Vicar General Msgr. Robert Siffrin, Judicial Vicar Msgr. Peter Polando, and Postulator for the Cause (and former Judicial Vicar) Msgr. Michael Cariglio, Jr., went to Rome to meet with the Congregation for the Causes of Saints and to go through the documents that were submitted in July of that year, eventually submitting the findings and results to Pope Francis in the hope that she will soon be declared Venerable.

== Legacy ==
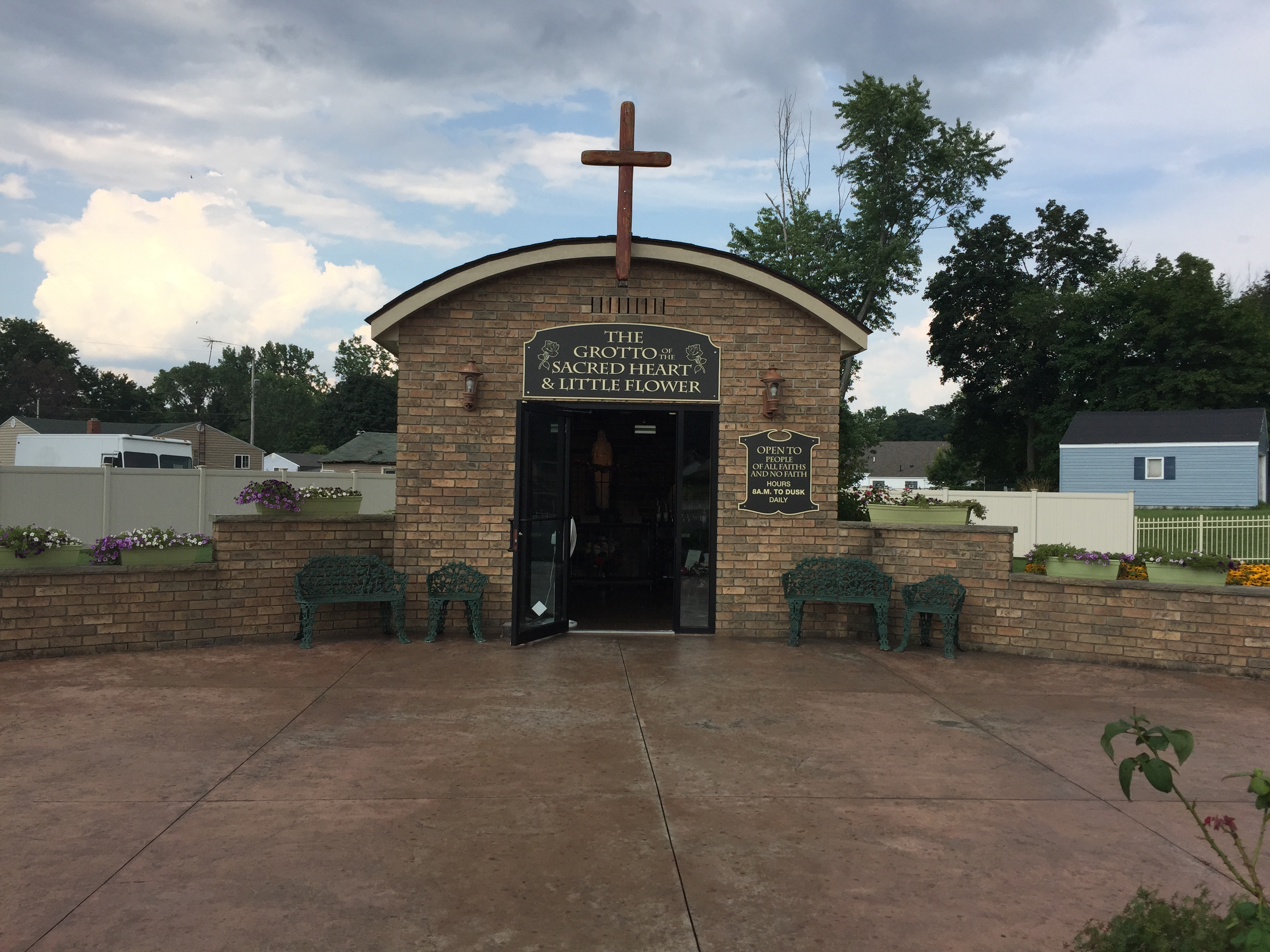
The Grotto of the Sacred Heart and Little Flower at the Rhoda Wise Shrine, August 2017

After Wise's death, her adult daughter Anna Mae Wise continued to welcome pilgrims to the Wise family home in Canton, keeping it open to the public for 47 years. When Anna Mae died in 1995, she willed the home to Mother Angelica and EWTN, who kept the house open to visitors. In 2001 the house was renovated and several structural problems repaired, but the bedroom which was the site of the claimed apparitions was left intact. A separate prayer chapel, the Grotto of the Sacred Heart and Little Flower, was erected in 2003 next to the house.

The Rhoda Wise Shrine, including the house, grounds and prayer chapel, is now a private association of the faithful that was approved for visitors' devotions by Bishop Murry of the Diocese of Youngstown.

A biography of Wise, Her Name Means Rose: The Rhoda Wise Story by Karen Sigler O.F.S., was published by EWTN in 2000.
