= Poor Clares of Perpetual Adoration =

Catholic order of cloistered nuns

- Abbreviation: PCPA
- Founded at: Paris, France
- Website: poorclares.org

The Poor Clares of Perpetual Adoration (PCPA) are a branch of the Poor Clares, a monastic order of nuns in the Franciscan tradition. Founded in France in 1854 by Marie Claire Bouillevaux, the Poor Clares of Perpetual Adoration are cloistered nuns dedicated to the celebration of the Liturgy of the hours and the perpetual adoration.

== History ==
The order was established on 8 December 1854 in Paris, France, by Marie de Ste. Claire Bouillevaux and Bonaventure Heurlaut for the purpose of the perpetual Eucharistic adoration. In 1856, the convent resettled in Troyes, and began perpetual adoration on 2 August 1856; the sisters have not ceased in worship since. Eventually, the order founded 36 autonomous monasteries: in France, Poland, Austria, Germany, Bangladesh, India, Kazakhstan, and the United States.

== Presence in the United States ==
In the United States, the first foundation was established in Cleveland, Ohio in 1921 from Vienna. As more nuns arrived, Bishop Joseph Schrembs of the Diocese of Cleveland searched for a larger space than their residence on Euclid Avenue and purchased the former St. Paul Episcopal Church, building a monastery for the nuns. It was dedicated as the Church of the Conversion of St. Paul in October 1931, and from 1949 to 2008 served as a parish church, but it has since reverted to its previous status as a shrine. The shrine is managed by the Capuchin Friars.

In 1946, the Cleveland house established Sancta Clara Monastery in Canton, Ohio. Cleveland also established a monastery for perpetual adoration in Washington, D.C. in 1954. In 2017, the Washington monastery closed and the two remaining nuns returned to Cleveland.

From the Canton house, Our Lady of the Angels Monastery in Irondale, Alabama was established in July 1961 and later moved to Hanceville. Our Lady of Solitude Monastery in Tonopah, Arizona, near Phoenix developed from Our Lady of the Angels. It is located within the Diocese of Phoenix and operates independently of the diocese, with the approval of the local bishop.

Recent years have seen the consolidation of their monasteries in the United States. St. Joseph Monastery was established in Portsmouth, Ohio around 2007. In 2010 it relocated to Charlotte, North Carolina at the invitation of Bishop Peter Joseph Jugis. In 2016, St. Joseph's merged with Our Lady of the Angels in Hanceville.

== See also ==
- Mother Angelica
