= WEWN =

- Vandiver / Irondale, Alabama; United States
- Broadcast area: United States; Latin America; Middle East; Southeast Asia; India
- Frequencies: 12050 kHz and 15610 kHz
- Branding: Eternal Word Network

Programming
- Languages: English; Spanish
- Format: Catholic Christian radio

Ownership
- Owner: Eternal Word Television Network

History
- First air date: December 28, 1992; 33 years ago
- Last air date: October 31, 2026
- Call sign meaning: Worldwide Eternal Word Network

Technical information
- Licensing authority: FCC
- Power: 250,000 watts (authorized for 500,000 watts)
- Transmitter coordinates: 33°30′13″N 86°28′27″W

Links
- Public license information: Public file; LMS
- Website: https://www.ewtn.com/radio

WEWN was the shortwave radio outlet of the EWTN, a large Roman Catholic international broadcaster based in Irondale, Alabama. It was launched by Mother Angelica on December 28, 1992. WEWN broadcast from the city of Vandiver, Alabama, in the vicinity of the Birmingham metro area. There are four transmitters capable of 500 kilowatts each, but are run no higher than 250 kW.

On March 30, 2008, EWTN ceased all shortwave transmissions to North America and expanded its English language coverage of WEWN to India, the Middle East and Southeast Asia. Spanish Language coverage was also expanded to Cuba, South America, Mexico and the Caribbean. Previously WEWN only broadcast to North America, Latin America, Africa and Europe.

The station transmitted English programming to Africa, Southeast Asia, the Middle East, India on SW, and Spanish programming to South America, the Caribbean, Mexico and Central America, via satellite Galaxy 15 at 133°W. Programming was similar to that of the network's television channel.

On August 31, 2021, EWTN announced that nine million more listeners in the Chicago market and beyond will have the ability to tune into EWTN Radio’s programs, through an affiliation with WNDZ. EWTN Radio programming is also available on The Station of the Cross network of AM and FM stations in upstate New York.

On October 31, 2026, EWTN ceased operations of WEWN.

== Frequencies and affiliates ==
Shortwave broadcast air on 12050 kHz (to Latin America) and 15610 kHz (to Southeast Asia, the Middle East, and India). Additionally, several American AM and FM stations across the country carry the network's programs.
