= Allen Green =

American football player (1938–2023)

No. 61, 44, 39
- Positions: Punter, placekicker

Personal information
- Born: February 15, 1938; Hanceville, Alabama, U.S.
- Died: February 14, 2023 (aged 84); Jackson, Mississippi, U.S.
- Listed height: 6 ft 2 in (1.88 m)
- Listed weight: 216 lb (98 kg)

Career information
- High school: Hanceville (AL)
- College: Mississippi
- NFL draft: 1961: 8th round, 109th overall pick

Career history
- New York Giants (1961)*; Dallas Cowboys (1961); Green Bay Packers (1962–1963)*; Alabama Hawks (1967–1969)
- * Offseason or practice squad member only

Awards and highlights
- National champion (1960)

Career NFL statistics
- Punts: 61
- Punting yards: 2,236
- Longest punt: 53
- Field goals made/attempts: 5/15
- Field goal %: 33.3
- Longest field goal: 32
- Stats at Pro Football Reference

Allen Leldon Green (February 15, 1938 – February 14, 2023) was an American professional football player who was a punter and placekicker in the National Football League (NFL) for the Dallas Cowboys. He played college football at the University of Mississippi.

== Early life ==
Green attended Hanceville High School before moving on to the University of Mississippi. He played as a center, but got an opportunity to start kicking field goals as a senior.

On October 26, 1960, he was named Lineman of the Week by the Associated Press, after making his first field goal in an official game and contributing to a controversial last second upset of the University of Arkansas 10–7. Against Louisiana State University, he made another last second field goal (a career-high 41 yards) to tie the game 6–6.

Green contributed to the team finishing with a 10–0–1 record, with the lone blemish the 6–6 tie against an inferior LSU squad (the Tigers went 5–4–1 after winning 20 of 22 games in 1958 and 1959). They also won the 1961 Sugar Bowl, defeating Rice University 14–6, the SEC championship and were recognized as national champions by the Football Writers Association of America.

== Professional career ==
=== New York Giants ===
Green was selected by the New York Giants in the eighth round (109th overall) of the 1961 NFL draft.

Green was sent to the Dallas Cowboys in a three-team deal on July 5, 1961. The Redskins acquired Fred Dugan, placekicker John Aveni, defensive back Dave Whitsell and offensive end Jerry Daniels. The New York Giants obtained offensive ends Joe Walton and Jim Podoley. The Cowboys received Green and a sixth round pick for the 1962 NFL draft that the team later used to draft George Andrie.

=== Dallas Cowboys ===
In 1961, he was given the punting duties from Dave Sherer. He was also the starting kicker until Dick Bielski took over for the final five games.

Green made a last second field goal in the season opener against the Pittsburgh Steelers, to earn the Cowboys first ever victory (27–24). On October 29, he made another tie-breaker field goal in the last minutes of the game against the New York Giants for a 17–16 win.

On April 27, 1962, he was traded to the Green Bay Packers in a three-team deal, with the Cowboys acquiring safety Dick Nolan and the New York Giants obtaining a draft pick from the Packers.

=== Green Bay Packers ===
Green was waived by the Green Bay Packers on August 19, 1964.

== Personal life and death ==
Green died on February 14, 2023, one day before his 85th birthday.
