= Mother Angelica =

American nun and founder of EWTN (1923–2016)

Mother Angelica PCPA
- Portrait of Mother Angelica
- Born: Rita Antoinette Rizzo; April 20, 1923; Canton, Ohio, U.S.
- Died: March 27, 2016 (aged 92); Hanceville, Alabama, U.S.
- Other name: Mary Angelica of the Annunciation
- Occupation: Religious sister
- Known for: Founding EWTN
- Notable credit: Mother Angelica Live (1983–2001)
- Website: https://www.olamshrine.com

Mary Angelica of the Annunciation PCPA (born Rita Antoinette Rizzo; April 20, 1923 – March 27, 2016), commonly referred to as "Mother Angelica", was an American Catholic nun of the Poor Clares of Perpetual Adoration.

Mother Angelica was known for founding the Eternal Word Television Network (EWTN), an international Catholic cable television network, on which she hosted the program Mother Angelica Live. She also established WEWN, a radio network used by members of the Catholic Church to disseminate its religious teachings.

In 1981, Mother Angelica began broadcasting religious programming from a converted garage in Birmingham, Alabama. Over the following two decades, she expanded the operation into a global media network that included television, radio, internet platforms, and print publications. She continued to host shows on EWTN until 2001, when she had a stroke. She remained in the cloistered monastery in Hanceville, Alabama, until she died in 2016.

== Early life ==
Rita Antoinette Rizzo was born on April 20, 1923, in Canton, Ohio. Canton's southeast area, where her family lived, was then known as the city's red-light district. This neighborhood was inhabited by both Black residents and a large number of Italian immigrants employed in the Canton mills. Italian immigrants in the area experienced challenges related to social mobility, including high rates of illiteracy, and extortion by the Black Hand. The neighborhood was also associated with corruption and mob-related violence. Catholic priests at St. Anthony's Church sought to improve the lives of the local population.

Rita was of Italian-American descent and the only child of John Rizzo, a tailor, and Mae Helen Rizzo (née Gianfrancesco). She was born at 1029 Liberty Street, the residence of her maternal grandparents, Mary and Anthony Gianfresco. Anthony had emigrated from Naples, Italy, first settling in Colorado before moving to Ohio and marrying Mary Votolato. Anthony assisted new Italian immigrants with clothing and employment, while Mary provided food to them. Their daughter Mae married John at the age of 22, against the advice of her parents, who disapproved of him. According to later accounts, John had expressed anger on learning that Mae was pregnant. When Rita was baptized at five months of age, her mother brought her to the side altar of Our Lady of Sorrows and handed her over in a symbolic gesture. The family of John and Mae initially lived in a rented house described as infested with cockroaches.

After repeated arguments, Mae began staying at her parents' home, and this became a recurring pattern. Tensions escalated when Mae invited John's mother, Catherine Rizzo, to live with them. Catherine reportedly criticized Mae frequently. By November 1929, John had left the family, relocated to California, and ceased contact with Mae and Rita. Mae and Rita, then age five, returned to the Gianfresco household. On March 10, 1931, Mae was granted full custody of Rita. Although John was ordered to pay five dollars per week in child support, payments were reported to be intermittent. Mae retained custody but struggled with chronic depression and poverty, difficulties that were exacerbated by the societal stigma surrounding divorce and limited economic opportunities for women during the Great Depression.

Between 1933 and 1937, Mae and Rita relocated multiple times to small one-bedroom apartments. These residences typically had a business space at the front and sleeping quarters at the back. Occasionally, when disputes arose between Mae and her mother, Rita stayed with family friends. Due to ongoing financial difficulties, Mae and Rita eventually returned to the Gianfresco household. During their absence, Anthony had suffered a stroke that left him hemiparetic and reliant on a cane.

Reflecting on this period, Mother Angelica later described the circumstances of her mother and her as similar to those of refugees. She recalled, "We were poor, hungry, and barely surviving on odd jobs until Mother joined the dry cleaning business as an apprentice to a Jewish tailor in our area. Even then, we pinched pennies simply to keep food on the table."

=== Education ===
Rita attended St. Anthony's School, where she later reported a strong dislike for the nuns, describing them as "the meanest people on earth." She attributed their harsh discipline to her status as the child of divorced parents. Mae Rizzo initially withdrew her daughter from the school temporarily, and the withdrawal later became permanent.

At age fourteen, Rita enrolled at McKinley High School in Canton, where she became one of the school's first drum majorettes. She later stated in an interview that she struggled academically, saying, "I did very poorly in school. I wasn't interested in the capital of Ohio. I was interested in whether my mother had committed suicide that day." Rita did not form close friendships during high school, a circumstance she attributed to her concern that doing so might distress her mother, who viewed competing demands for attention as threatening. Nor did Rita engage in dating, later recalling: "I never had a date, never wanted one. I just didn't have any desire. I suppose having experienced the worst of married life, it was not at all attractive to me."

By the time she began high school, financial constraints necessitated a return to the Gianfresco household, where her two uncles and grandparents also resided. Her grandfather Anthony had experienced a stroke, which intensified his previously volatile temperament. Despite these circumstances, the family had stable housing and consistent meals, and Rita attempted to maintain her academic performance with varying success.

In 1939, Rita began leaving McKinley High School in the afternoons, feeling overwhelmed by the noise and activity of the school environment. She was prescribed calcium and nerve medication to address what was diagnosed as a nervous condition. During this period, her mother's mental health appeared to deteriorate, and arrangements were made for Mae to stay with a relative in Philadelphia. Rita, however, remained in Canton and experienced feelings of guilt about her mother's absence. She attempted to maintain a routine and earned money by performing baton-twirling. She expressed a persistent fear that her circumstances would not improve and that her mother would not recover.

Rizzo also gave baton lessons and worked in a factory that produced liturgical candles, sending part of her earnings to her mother in Philadelphia. During this time, she missed nearly two months of school near the end of her junior year and failed three subjects. She enrolled in summer school without informing her mother. As a consequence, she had to relinquish her position as drum majorette, a role she had found personally affirming and which had helped her become comfortable in front of crowds.

When her mother returned from Philadelphia, her condition had improved. Rita arranged for her to take the civil service examination, which she passed, and in 1941, Mae secured employment as a bookkeeper, providing her with financial stability and emotional balance. Rita graduated from McKinley High School that same year.

== Adulthood ==
In December 1940, Rizzo experienced an episode of abdominal pain and diarrhea. Her condition persisted, and by early 1941, she was experiencing spasms approximately three times per week. As her gastrointestinal symptoms worsened, her grandparents arranged for her to be examined by their physician, Dr. James Pagano. Suspecting complications, he initiated treatment for potential ulcers or gall bladder issues. The prescribed treatment did not alleviate her symptoms, however, and by November she had lost 20 pounds. X-rays subsequently identified a diagnosis of gastroptosis. Use of a medical support belt led to an improvement in her symptoms and allowed her to manage daily life more comfortably.

=== Healing and religious vocation ===
Following the attack on Pearl Harbor in December 1941, Rizzo obtained a position early the next year in the advertising department of the Timken Roller Bearing Company, a major manufacturer of gun barrels. Serving as secretary to the vice president of advertising, she was considered successful in her role. In April 1942, her abdominal pain intensified and could no longer be managed with her existing medical belt. Dr. Wiley Scott prescribed a larger belt or corset, which alleviated the pain and allowed her to return to work. However, by November 1942, she experienced worsening symptoms, including inability to sleep or eat, and the surgical corset caused skin blisters.

In response to her declining condition, her mother brought her to Rhoda Wise, a local figure described as a mystic and stigmatic who claimed to receive visions of Saint Thérèse of Lisieux. Wise instructed Rizzo to pray a novena and asked her to promise that, if cured, she would promote devotion to St. Thérèse.

On January 17, 1943, the final day of the novena, Rizzo reported experiencing the "sharpest pains" she had ever felt and a sensation that "something was pulling [her] stomach out." Although she considered putting on her corset before getting up, she stated that a voice commanded her to rise without it. She interpreted this moment as healing and later observed that the abdominal lump and discoloration had resolved. Rizzo believed this event to be a miracle and identified it as the turning point in her life that led to her religious commitment. She later stated, "I knew that God knew me and loved me and was interested in me. All I wanted to do after my healing was give myself to Jesus."

Dr. Wiley Scott did not support the claim of a miraculous healing and described Rizzo as "a neurotic female with a mentality which is very open to any suggestive influence." Nonetheless, for Rizzo, the experience marked a significant transformation and a new direction in life.

Rizzo turned to Wise for guidance, and she became her model of sanctity. Every Sunday, Rizzo joined the crowds at Wise's house and would sit close to the mystic. She learned to deal with overanxious crowds who, at times, mistook God's assistant for God himself. Rizzo adopted devotional practices including fasting on Saturdays, reading spiritual literature, and performing the Way of the Cross at St. Anthony's Church, developing a devotion to the Passion. On a fall afternoon in 1943, when Rizzo prayed before the statue of Our Lady of Sorrows, she was overcome by a "deep awareness" that she had a vocation and must "go wherever the Lord would send her." She sought out Wise's spiritual director, Monsignor Habig, who affirmed the vocation. Wise gave her lists of communities to contact but most would not accept her due to her poor grades.

Her first visit was to the Sisters of St. Joseph in Buffalo, New York. Msgr. Habig then suggested she visit Saint Paul's Shrine of Perpetual Adoration, a facility operated by an order of cloistered contemplative Franciscan nuns in Cleveland, Ohio. While visiting this order, she felt as if she were at home. The order accepted her as a postulant, inviting her to enter on August 15, 1944, at the age of 21. On November 8, 1945, Rizzo was vested as a Poor Clare nun. She received a new religious name, Angelica, which her mother was given the honor of choosing by the superior of the monastery, Mother Agnes. Her mother chose this name because Rizzo had been an "angelic and obedient daughter." Her full spiritual name was "Sister Mary Angelica of the Annunciation".

Soon afterward, the Cleveland monastery established a new monastery in her home town of Canton and she moved there. After nearly three years in the monastery, Sister Angelica made her first profession of vows on January 2, 1947. In 1953, she made her solemn profession of vows at Sancta Clara Monastery in Canton.

=== Injury and "Bargain with God" ===
In 1953, Sister Angelica had an accident with an industrial floor-scrubbing machine that knocked her over and injured her spine, causing her ongoing pain and later requiring her to wear leg braces for much of her life. The ache radiated from the small of her back to the middle of the left leg. In June 1955, she sought medical review of her back pain and was given a brace to relieve the pain caused by the fall. The doctors believed the fall in 1953 had aggravated an existing spinal defect. She was fitted for a body cast to relieve her compressed spine and given oversized crutches. This treatment failed, however; so leg and neck traction were attempted, in which she was suspended from a hospital-bed contraption for six weeks. She spent a total of four months in the hospital with no improvement, and she returned to the monastery with a back brace.

To alleviate pain and restore posture, her doctors decided on a spinal fusion operation, for which she was admitted to the hospital in July 1956. The surgeon, Dr. Charles Houck, informed Sister Angelica that there was a "fifty-fifty chance you'll never walk again." Angelica struck a bargain with God: "Lord, if you let me walk again, I'll build you a monastery in the South." For three years, she had been discussing a southern monastery dedicated to African Americans. This was the year the Supreme Court banned segregation in public schools and Dr. Martin Luther King Jr. made headlines by organizing protests throughout the South. During the operation, Dr. Houck found an extra vertebra crowding its neighbors, and that the resulting "kissing vertebrae" were the main cause of her pain. He apparently thought the surgery had gone wrong and gave up. Angelica could move her legs but not walk, so she recovered in the hospital for two months.

Back at Sancta Clara, she was confined to the infirmary. As a result of suffering, she learned to rely on God in all things. Eventually, she graduated from a wheelchair to a back brace, leg brace, and crutch, and felt she could think about the new monastery. The new abbess of Sancta Clara, Mother Veronica, initially refused the idea but became fully convinced over time. In January 1957, Mother Veronica wrote to Archbishop Thomas Toolen of Mobile, stating her community's desire to be in "the midst of the colored people to intercede for them." Archbishop Toolen warmly invited the nuns to the diocese and encouraged them to start the community in Birmingham, then home to a quarter of a million Black people.

However, Bishop Emmet Walsh of Youngstown, Ohio, delayed the foundation as he felt the departure of six nuns required by Canon Law could not be sustained by the community in Canton. With some other Poor Clare nuns, Sister Angelica worked to raise the necessary funds, partially from a small business venture making and selling fishing lures. In February 1961, funding had been secured and Rome granted permission to proceed with the new foundation.

=== Our Lady of the Angels, Irondale ===
In 1961, the nuns bought 15 mountainside acres in Irondale, Alabama, as well as an adjacent small house, for $13,000, the exact amount earned by the nuns' fishing lure business. On the night of February 21, 1962, five bullets were fired at the house where the nuns were staying, and a further incident with five bullets occurred nearly two weeks later. On May 20, 1962, the community was officially established and named Our Lady of the Angels Monastery. Later, it was relocated to the grounds of the Shrine of the Most Blessed Sacrament. The subject experienced the baptism of the Holy Spirit, which a Birmingham priest associated with the Charismatic Renewal had told her about, which resulted in a new understanding of the Holy Spirit.

=== Shrine of the Most Blessed Sacrament ===
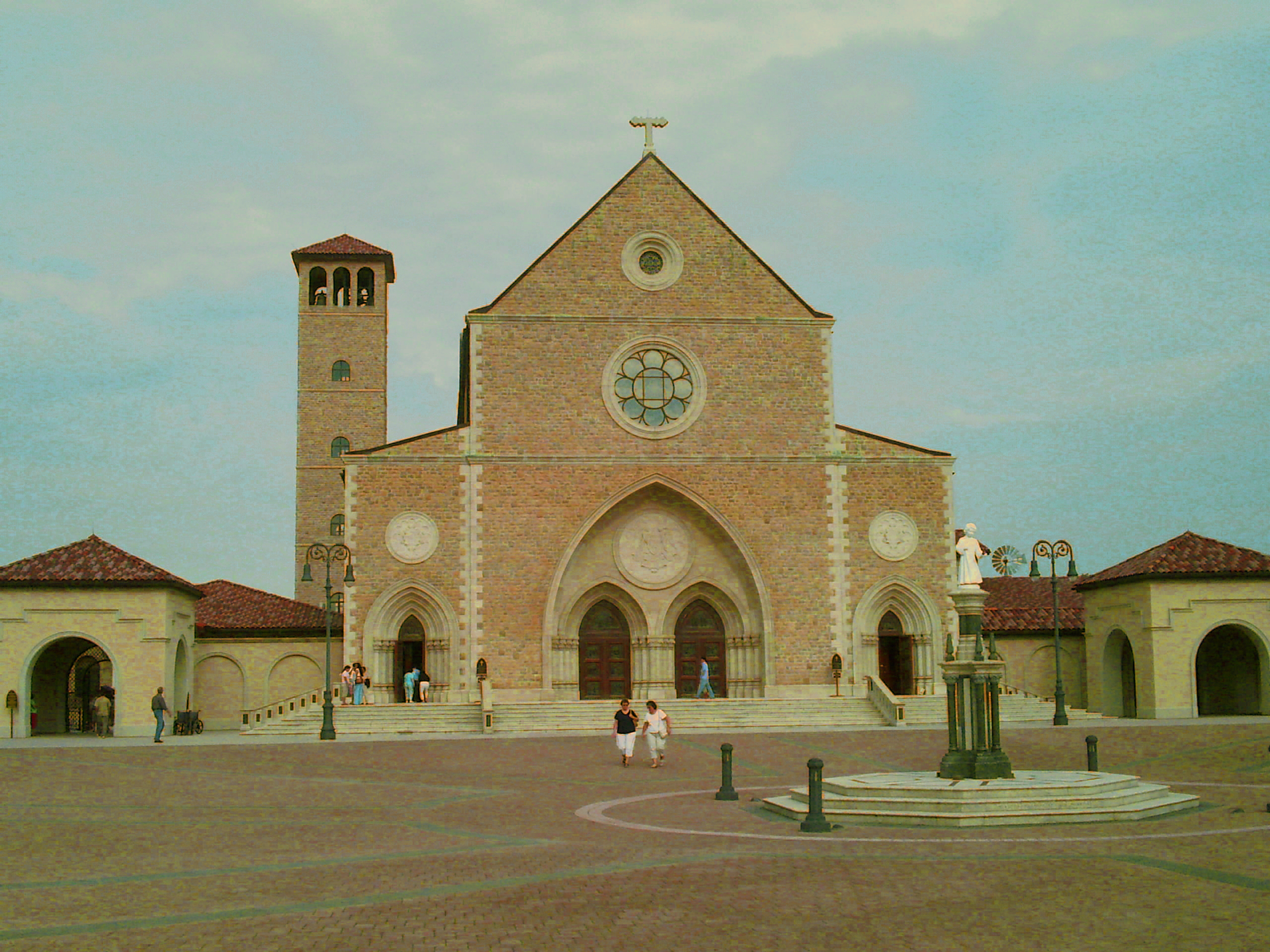
Shrine of the Most Blessed Sacrament, Hanceville

In August 1995, Sister Angelica began to search for land to build a new monastery because she was convinced that the sisters needed "protection" during a coming chastisement, and concerned that the noise pollution around the existing monastery was unsuitable for contemplative life.

In October 1995, she viewed a 200-acre plot in Hanceville, an hour north of Birmingham. "I felt the Lord's presence so strongly," she said. The architect of the monastery, Walter Anderton, was a Baptist. Mother Angelica's only instructions to him were that the monastery resemble the Basilica of Saint Francis of Assisi and have a 13th-century character.

In 1996, Mother Angelica visited South America to publicize her new Spanish-language channel. While in Bogotá, Colombia, she visited a small shrine of the Divino Niño (Divine Child), where she later revealed that she had a vision in which the statue of the Child Jesus turned to her and said in a child's audible voice, "Build Me a temple and I will help those who help you." Mother Angelica interpreted this vision as the Christ Child's desire for an elaborate shrine. Private donors contributed $48.6 million toward it and she opened the Shrine of the Most Blessed Sacrament in Hanceville in 1999.

=== EWTN ===
In 1962, Mother Angelica began a series of community meetings on matters relevant to Catholicism and also began recording her talks for sale. When Bishop Joseph Vath of Birmingham noticed her talent for communicating with the lay public, he encouraged her to continue. She began taping a radio show for Sunday-morning broadcast and published her first book in 1972. In the late 1970s, she began videotaping her talks for television, which were broadcast on the satellite Christian Broadcasting Network. In 1981, after visiting a Chicago television studio and being impressed by its capability, she formed a nonprofit civil corporation to be called the Eternal Word Television Network (EWTN), at first recording her shows in a converted garage on the monastery's property.

On February 16, 1981, the Sacred Congregation for Religious informed Bishop Vath that because Mother Angelica was a cloistered nun, she could not travel except to her studio although she had been giving talks outside for years with the bishop's blessing. The apostolic nuncio suggested exclaustration—the suspension of a religious from his or her community and vows for three years—an idea that shocked Mother Angelica. Cardinal Silvio Oddi, head of the Sacred Congregation for the Clergy, rescued the situation after visiting Mother Angelica and securing exemptions under Church law that enabled her to leave the monastery on business.

EWTN's positions on social and religious issues frequently mirrored the ones of Pope John Paul II. Mother Angelica's emphasis on tradition led to feuds with some members of the Church hierarchy, the most famous being over a pastoral letter by Cardinal Roger Mahony of the Archdiocese of Los Angeles concerning teachings about the Eucharist and the liturgy.

As the largest Catholic television network in the world, EWTN estimated the network's channels reached 264 million households globally in 2016. In 2026, EWTN reaches an estimated 425 million viewers in over 160 countries. It draws additional viewers on its website, with almost 174,000 average monthly unique viewers in 2024, and another 3.4 million subscribers and followers on social media.

=== WEWN ===
On December 28, 1992, Mother Angelica launched a radio network, WEWN, which is carried by 215 stations and on shortwave.

== Later years ==
Among highlights of Mother Angelica's later years are these:

On November 12, 1997, speaking on her Mother Angelica Live show, she called on the faithful under Los Angeles Cardinal Roger Mahony to disobey his Guide for Sunday Mass, saying, "I'm afraid my obedience in that diocese would be absolutely zero, and I hope everybody else's in that diocese is zero." Six days later, however, she apologized.

On January 28, 1998, Paula Albertini, an Italian woman, prayed the rosary with Mother Angelica in her office. Another nun, Sister Mary Clare, saw a bright glow surrounding the painting of Saint Francis reaching up to the crucified Christ. Mother Angelica was urged to "defend the Holy Eucharist even with your own life." She felt that God wished to heal her, and this occurred when Albertini asked her to remove the braces and Mother Angelica's unsteadiness vanished, with no further need for crutches. Later Mother Angelica told Life on the Rock host Jeff Cavins that the purpose of the healing was to increase the faith of her viewers and employees.

In the late 1990s, Mother Angelica's EWTN show was so popular that she was occasionally the victim of live call-in pranks by Captain Janks that were aired on The Howard Stern Show. Most of these calls were of a vulgar, sexual nature, but she handled them with her usual stern, but forgiving, candor.

Mother Angelica founded a Catholic community of lay brothers, the Knights of the Holy Eucharist, as part of her broader efforts to promote Eucharistic reverence and traditional Catholic spirituality on July 25, 1998, the Feast of St. James the Greater, in Hanceville. They initially served there at the Shrine of the Most Blessed Sacrament, but moved in 2016 to the diocese of Lincoln, at the invitation of Bishop James D. Conley, taking residence at the Our Lady of Good Counsel Retreat House near the small city of Waverly.<

=== Ad Orientem controversy ===
Since the first establishment of Mother Angelica's monastery in 1962, the priest celebrating the conventual Mass had always faced the enclosed nuns with his back to the rest of the congregation, an eastward-facing stance called ad orientem in Latin. Subsequently to the Second Vatican Council, however, most priests began facing the congregation (versus populum), but ad orientem remained favored in conciliar documents and the monastery followed this.

On October 18, 1999, Bishop David Foley of Birmingham promulgated a law in his diocese forbidding ad orientem, at which Mother Angelica wrote to the Vatican. The Congregation for Divine Worship and the Discipline of the Sacraments sent a fax to Bishop Foley condemning his decree, stating that individual diocesan bishops could not forbid ad orientem. As Mother Angelica was unaware of this, however, Bishop Foley was able to continue defending his position by stating that he was representing the NCCB.

On December 4, Cardinal Eduardo Somalo wrote Mother Angelica, stating that an apostolic visitation had been appointed and that there would be a probe into the monastery.

On December 9, Bishop Foley consecrated the Shrine of the Most Blessed Sacrament and celebrated mass facing the people. He then rescinded his October 18, 1999, decree, instead forbidding the broadcast of ad orientem Masses. EWTN moved its Masses to Birmingham to comply with this change, as Mother Angelica and the vice presidents of EWTN worried that the Congregation for Divine Worship and the Discipline of the Sacraments or Bishop Foley could compel Mother Angelica to make changes at EWTN or, in a worst-case scenario, appoint a progressive successor with veto powers. She resigned as CEO of EWTN on March 17, 2000, ceding control to a board of laity, and settled into community life and enjoyment of her time away from the network.

=== Stroke and reduced capacity ===
On July 3, 2000, Mother Angelica collapsed, turned blue, and became unconscious. All tests were normal and she recovered rapidly.

On September 5, 2001, she suffered facial paralysis, with an MRI showing she'd had bilateral recurrent strokes. She returned to taping her show twice weekly on September 25. On December 11, she fell and fractured her arm, requiring surgery.

On Christmas Eve, Mother Angelica collapsed in the monastery chapel and was found unresponsive, with a CT scan revealing a cerebral hemorrhage. She was transferred to Birmingham and underwent a craniotomy to remove the blood clot from around her brain. Despite this, there had already been damage to the part of the brain controlling speech and understanding. However, within one week, she could move both legs, and the paralysis that had affected her left hand and mouth for three months had gone.

On January 25, 2002, Mother Angelica returned to her monastery but needed assistance from then on. She also suffered from seizures, which sapped her energy. She also began speech therapy and stopped hosting television programs. As her health declined, other sisters at the Hanceville monastery began providing her constant care. She attributed her need for purification as the reason for her stroke.

=== Last overseas trips ===
Mother Angelica was eager for one more miracle and felt she could be useful in helping the faithful to cope with the clerical sex-abuse scandal, which broke in early 2002. In October 2003, she travelled to Lourdes for a six-day pilgrimage, during which she and the other pilgrims reached out to one another. Although she did not receive physical healing, she discovered she was still needed and could do much good, even in silence.

In December 2004, Mother Angelica visited the Japanese island of Kyushu to explore the possibility of a monastery in Nagasaki. She then went north to visit the shrine of Our Lady of Akita, but was in considerable pain and a doctor felt that she had fractured her tailbone while in Akita. Following all this, Mother Angelica was much less mobile and more frail.

=== Daughter houses ===
Before her major stroke, Mother Angelica had been considering the founding of new monasteries. Following her 2001 stroke, though, overseeing this effort seemed beyond reach. There were 42 nuns at the Hanceville monastery, but not all the older nuns agreed to founding new monasteries because theirs was only five years old. Five nuns, however—the "Phoenix Phive," led by Sister Mary Fidelis—founded a monastery in Phoenix, Arizona, in 2005.

In July 2008, Sister Grace Marie, a former Anglican convert, and four other nuns started a new foundation with Mother Angelica's blessing in San Antonio, Texas. The nuns who left for San Antonio had been "bridging the gap" between two factions of nuns who would soon have a major dispute.

=== Disharmony at the monastery ===
Mother Angelica remained abbess during this time, but her incapacity left the effective exercise of leadership to the elected vicar, Sister Catherine, to whom most of the young nuns looked up, and many of the older ones as well although a few felt marginalized. Sister Catherine began spreading a devotion known as the "Divine Will devotion" rooted in the writings of alleged Italian mystic Luisa Piccarreta, which some of the older nuns disapproved of.

Community elections were held in May 2009 and Sister Margaret Mary was chosen as the new vicar. She quickly called chapter meetings to reconsider the vocations of younger nuns, especially practitioners of the controversial Divine Will devotion. This divided the community as Mother Angelica's health deteriorated. A group of nuns wrote a letter of complaint to Rome, and the Holy See authorized an apostolic visitation formally to investigate the community. The visitation resulted in the appointment of a new superior from outside the community in November 2009, with Mother Angelica stepping down as abbess, and both Sister Margaret Mary and Sister Catherine being made to leave immediately on sabbatical.

On October 4, 2009, Mother Angelica and Deacon Bill Steltemeier, then-chairman of EWTN's board of governors, received the Papal Medal (Pro Ecclesia et Pontifice) from Pope Benedict XVI for their distinguished service to the Catholic Church. Due to her ill health, Mother Angelica received the award in her room. Robert Joseph Baker, Bishop of Birmingham, said: "Mother Angelica's effort has been at the vanguard of the new evangelization and has had a great impact on our world." On October 15, she received another major honor from the Holy See when she was appointed the community's Abbess Emerita for life.

In early December 2015, Mother Angelica was placed on a feeding tube. A representative of the order explained, "It's not that she's completely unable to eat. It's assisting her to get the nutrients she needs." He added that she had experienced "some up and downs the last few months. She's a fighter." Although Mother Angelica was bedridden, a representative said she was "able to communicate with a squeeze of a hand, make gestures with her eyes. She acknowledges people when they're there. The nuns say she does sleep a lot."

The use of a feeding tube was in accord with the wishes Mother Angelica had made before her stroke in 2001—a reporter recalled her saying: "We don't understand the awesomeness of living even one more day... I told my sisters the other day, 'When I get really bad give me all the medicine I can take, all the tubes you can stuff down me. ... I want to live. ... Because I will have suffered one more day for the love of God... I will exercise you in virtue. But most of all I will know God better. You cannot measure the value of one new thought about God in your own life.'"

In early February 2016, Pope Francis, while en route to Cuba for an apostolic visit, recorded a message for Mother Angelica: "To Mother Angelica, with my blessing and I ask you to pray for me; I need it. God bless you, Mother Angelica." Near the end of that month, her fellow nuns at Our Lady of Angels Monastery called for prayers on her behalf, saying in a statement: "Mother's condition remains delicate and she receives devoted care day and night by her sisters and nurses. In God's Providence, she was able to receive the special Jubilee grace of passing through the Holy Door shortly after its opening. Although she is most often sleeping, from time to time Mother will give a radiant smile. ... Please continue to keep her in your prayers; each day is a gift!"

Mother Angelica remained at the monastery until her death on March 27, 2016, Easter Sunday, at the age of 92, from complications due to the stroke she had 14 years prior. At the time of her death, she "also suffered from Bell's palsy, heart disease and asthma."

Mother Angelica held the Catholic belief in redemptive suffering, whereby human suffering can become meritorious if offered to Jesus Christ and mystically united with his suffering. For this, in her period of declining health, Mother Angelica "instructed her nuns to do everything to keep her alive, no matter how much she suffered, because every day she suffered, she suffered for God." EWTN chaplain Father Joseph Mary Wolfe told reporters that Mother Angelica's desire to unite with Jesus in suffering was fulfilled when she "went into her death throes on Good Friday".

Fr. Wolfe recalled that "Mother began to cry out early in the morning from the pain that she was having. She had a fracture in her bones because of the length of time she had been bedridden. They said you could hear it down the hallways, that she was crying out on Good Friday from what she was going through. These two people [a caregiver and one of the sisters of her order] said to me she has excruciating pain." Fr. Wolfe said that "After the 3 o'clock hour arrived on Good Friday she was more calm, she was more peaceful."

By 5:30 a.m. on Easter Sunday, Fr. Wolfe was contacted by Mother Delores, who told him Mother Angelica "was really struggling, she wasn't doing very well." He went to her bedside to administer the last rites, with the sisters of her order praying the Divine Office around her. As it was Easter Sunday, the usual prayers had additional Alleluias, which are otherwise not recited in the Office for the Dead, and something that Fr. Wolfe felt to be significant. Around 10:30 a.m., another priest Father Paschal said Mass in her room and she received Viaticum (final Communion). She died shortly before 5:00 p.m.

=== Tributes ===
Father Sean O. Sheridan, former president of the Franciscan University of Steubenville where Mother Angelica received an honorary doctorate of sacred theology, described her as "a true media giant. She proved that the Church belonged in the popular media alongside the news, sports, and talk shows."

Greg Evans of Deadline—a publication about major news in the media industry— also known as Deadline Hollywood, wrote: "Though her stances were decidedly old-school—she was critical of religious and political progressives—her lectures were lightened with an often self-deprecating humor. She famously said the nuns she remembered from her youth were 'the meanest people on God's earth.'"

On March 30, 2016, Easter Wednesday, at Pope Francis' general audience in Saint Peter's Square, Vatican City, an employee of EWTN held up a portrait of Mother Angelica. The Supreme Pontiff responded to the display by saying, "She's in Heaven."

In a ceremony on March 29, 2016, Mother Angelica's body was brought to Our Lady of the Angels Monastery for private visitation by Poor Clare nuns, following which public visitation was held in the upper church of the Shrine of the Most Blessed Sacrament from March 30 to 31. The Mass of Christian Burial was also celebrated in the upper church on April 1, with Archbishop of Philadelphia and EWTN board member Charles J. Chaput serving as principal celebrant, and EWTN chaplain Joseph Mary Wolfe as homilist.

Concelebrants of the Mass included Archbishop Carlo Maria Viganò, the Apostolic Nuncio to the United States, who delivered a message from Pope Francis; Robert J. Baker and David E. Foley, the then-current and emeritus bishops of Birmingham, in which diocese both EWTN and Our Lady of the Angels Monastery are located; Archbishop Thomas J. Rodi of Mobile, whose ecclesiastical province includes the Diocese of Birmingham; Bishop Thomas Olmsted of Phoenix, where the Poor Clares monastery founded in 2005 is located; and Bishop Richard Stika of Knoxville, Tennessee. In addition, many priests, including Monsignor Walter Rossi, Rector of the Basilica of the National Shrine of the Immaculate Conception Washington DC, deacons, religious, and seminarians were in attendance. Following the service, the rite of committal at the shrine's crypt chapel. All of the funeral rites for Mother Angelica were broadcast by EWTN.

==== Beatification process ====
After her death, there were calls for Mother Angelica to be beatified. Canon Law dictates that an individual's cause cannot begin until five years after his or her death, which thus became possible in 2021.
