= EWTN =

Catholic television network based in the U.S.

Eternal Word Television Network

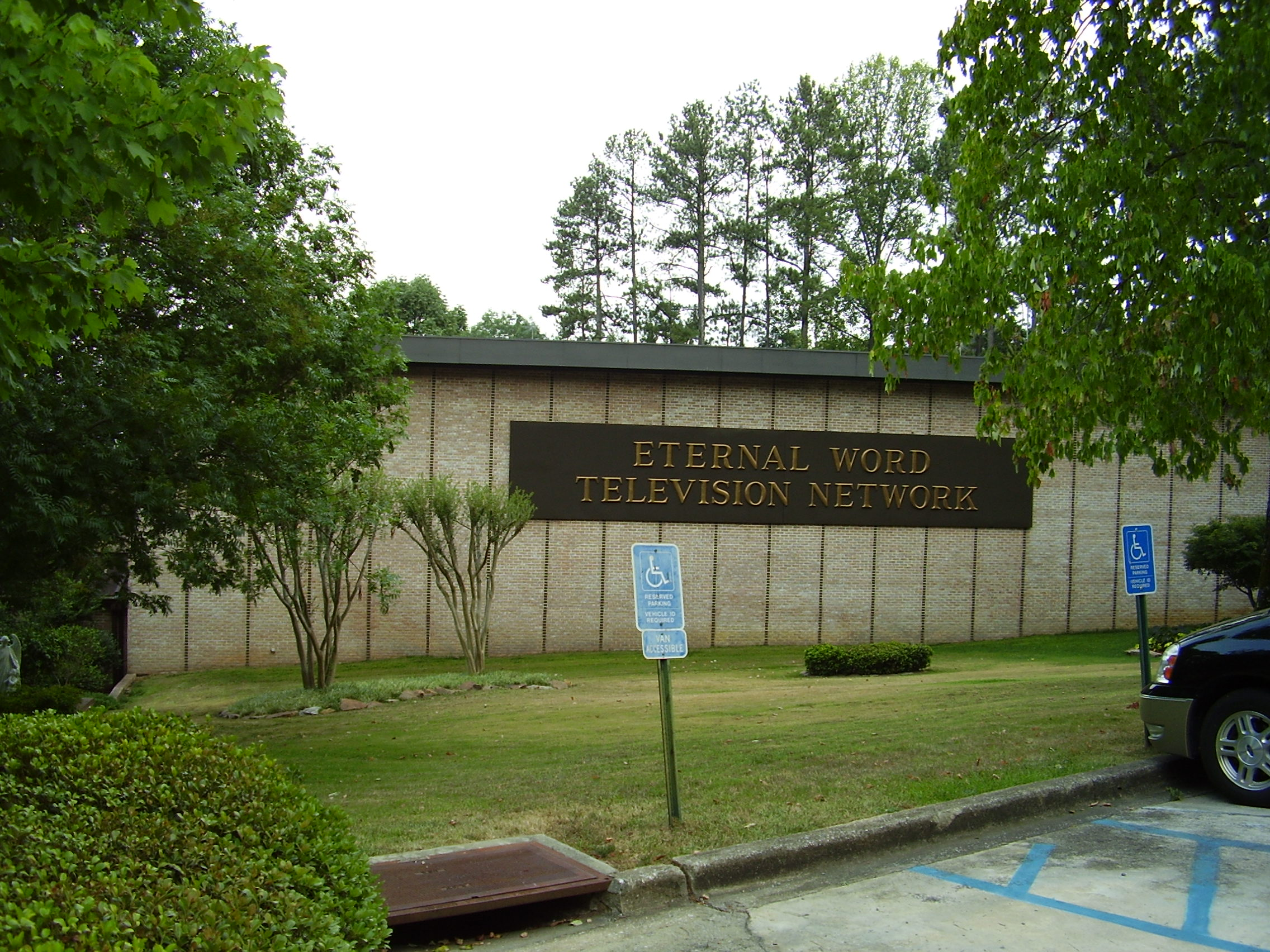
- EWTN's main studio in Irondale, Alabama
- Country: United States
- Broadcast area: Worldwide
- Headquarters: Irondale, Alabama

Programming
- Language: English
- Picture format: 1080i HDTV (downscaled to 480i/576i for the SD feed)

Ownership
- Owner: Eternal Word Television Network Inc. (a non-profit corporation)

History
- Launched: August 15, 1981; 45 years ago
- Founder: Mother Angelica

Links
- Website: www.ewtn.com

Availability

Terrestrial
- EWTN Radio: AM/FM affiliates

Streaming media
- LIVE Stream: Live TV Stream

The Eternal Word Television Network (EWTN) is a basic cable television network which presents around-the-clock and commercial-free Catholic programming. It is the largest Catholic television network in the United States, and is purported to be "the world's largest religious media network", (and according to the network itself) reaching 425 million people in 160 countries, with 11 networks.

The network was originally founded by Mother Angelica PCPA, in 1980 and began broadcasting on 15 August 1981 from a garage studio at the Our Lady of the Angels Monastery in Irondale, Alabama, which Mother Angelica founded in 1962. She hosted her own show, Mother Angelica Live, until health issues led to her retirement in September 2001. As of 2017, Michael P. Warsaw, who is a consultant to the Vatican's Dicastery for Communications, leads EWTN.

In addition to its television network, EWTN owns the National Catholic Register newspaper, which it acquired in January 2011, and Catholic News Agency. The network maintains an online presence through its primary site, EWTN.com, and it has a dedicated commercial site, EWTNReligiousCatalogue.com. EWTN also operates a 24-hour radio network, offering Catholic talk and worship programming through approximately 600 AM and FM affiliates worldwide, SiriusXM Satellite Radio, and digital platforms. Its shortwave radio station, WEWN, launched in 1992 and was scheduled to close on October 31, 2026. Some of the schedule is the audio from EWTN television shows and some is original programming for radio listeners.

Regular network programs include a daily Catholic Mass and sometimes in the Tridentine Mass format, the traditionalist Stations of the Cross, a taped daily recitation of the Rosary, and daily and weekly news, discussion, and Catechetical programs for both adults and children. Christmas and Easter programming; the installation Masses of bishops and cardinals; coverage of World Youth Days; and Papal visits, deaths, funerals, conclaves, and elections are also presented. Spanish language broadcasts are available on all platforms. On December 8, 2009, EWTN began broadcasting high-definition television.

The network is overseen by a non-profit board of trustees, with the network's funding provided solely by viewer support and purchases from the network's online store, known as the EWTN Religious Catalogue; the network has no financing from either the Vatican, nor the United States Conference of Catholic Bishops, or provider retransmission consent.

In June 2026, María Montserrat Alvarado, former president and chief operating officer of EWTN News, was appointed by Pope Leo XIV to be the head of the Vatican Dicastery for Communication, the leader of communications for the Vatican.

== Development ==
Mother Angelica made her profession of vows in 1953. In 1962 she established Our Lady of the Angels monastery. During the 1970s, she was an in-demand lecturer and produced pamphlets and audio and video tapes. She had been a guest on local station WBMG (currently WIAT, Channel 42), and on shows on the Christian Broadcasting Network and the Trinity Broadcasting Network. After she gave an interview on then-Christian station WCFC (Channel 38) in Chicago, she decided she wanted her own network. "I walked in, and it was just a little studio, and I remember standing in the doorway and thinking, 'It doesn't take much to reach the masses'. I just stood there and said to the Lord, 'Lord, I've got to have one of these'".

Mother Angelica purchased satellite space and EWTN began broadcasting on August 15, 1981, with four hours of daily programming, which included her own show, Mother Angelica Live (aired bi-weekly), a Sunday Mass, and reruns of older Catholic programs such as Archbishop Fulton J. Sheen's Life Is Worth Living. The remainder of the time was filled with shows produced by dioceses across the country, shows from Protestant sources which Mother Angelica determined were in concert with Catholic teachings, and children's shows such as Joy Junction and The Sunshine Factory. About one-third of programming time consisted of secular content, such as re-runs of The Bill Cosby Show, public domain films, and cooking and western-themed shows. EWTN eventually increased its broadcast schedule to six hours per day and then to eight hours per day by 1986. Secular content was gradually reduced from 1986 to 1988, and satellite distribution was expanded late in 1987, after which EWTN acquired a far more desirable satellite channel and began broadcasting around the clock. At this point, EWTN began broadcasting the praying of the rosary on a daily basis and added a number of educational shows. In-house production of original programming gradually increased. The Mass became televised daily in 1991 from a chapel on the monastery grounds. Most shows from non-Catholic sources were eliminated and a more theological image gradually developed.

From 1982 to 1994, the network had competition from another Catholic broadcaster, the Catholic Telecommunications Network of America. The network was sponsored by the National Conference of Catholic Bishops which poured $30 million into the venture before it failed.

In 2000, "in the midst of an apostolic visitation by San Juan Archbishop Roberto González Nieves" to investigate Mother Angelica's authority over the station and monastery, Mother Angelica gave control of EWTN to a board of lay people.

As of 2011, the network's chairman of the board and chief executive officer is Michael P. Warsaw.

As of 2019, EWTN programming was available through "more than 6,000 TV affiliates as well as on Roku, Apple TV, Amazon Fire and YouTube". In addition to its Irondale campus, the network maintains a Washington, D.C., facility for its news division, along with a West Coast broadcast facility on the campus of the Christ Cathedral in Garden Grove, California.

== Other media ==
=== Radio ===
EWTN launched WEWN, its shortwave radio station in Vandiver, Alabama, near Birmingham, on December 28, 1992. It discontinued shortwave broadcasts directed specifically at North America in 2008; subsequent English-language transmissions primarily served Africa and the Middle East, while Spanish-language broadcasts targeted Latin America.

On October 30, 2026, EWTN announced that WEWN would cease broadcasting on October 31, citing declining shortwave listenership, aging transmission equipment, and high operating and maintenance costs. EWTN Radio continued distributing its programming through AM and FM affiliates, satellite, and digital platforms.

In 1996, Mother Angelica announced that EWTN would make its radio signal available via satellite to AM and FM stations throughout the United States at no cost.

In 1999, programs included Mother Angelica Live and "Life Is Worth Living" with Fulton J. Sheen. WGSN in North Myrtle Beach, South Carolina, was an affiliate. Current radio programs include Open Line in which callers can have their questions regarding the Catholic Faith answered.

In 2004, EWTN announced an agreement with Sirius Satellite Radio, which thereafter merged with XM Satellite Radio to become Sirius XM Satellite Radio. EWTN broadcasts on Channel 130 on Sirius XM.

As of August 2020, EWTN Radio is affiliated with 384 stations in the United States and more than 500 stations globally.

=== Newspapers ===
==== National Catholic Register ====
In January 2011, EWTN acquired the National Catholic Register, a newspaper founded in Denver, Colorado, in 1924 as a periodical for local Catholics, and which became a national publication three years later. EWTN officially assumed total control on February 1, 2011.

==== Catholic News Agency ====
Logo of Catholic New Agency

EWTN also owns Catholic News Agency which is a Catholic news service with bureaus in Washington DC, Latin America and Europe.

=== News coverage ===
The EWTN news department produces a daily news service for television and radio, featuring news sources including Vatican Radio. A reflection of its size and influence is that it has 30 staff members covering the Vatican alone, "far outnumbering other English-language media outlets".

== Finance ==
While the network has trustees, it does not have shareholders or owners. A majority of the network's funding is from viewer donations about which it advertises 100% viewer supported, which keeps it from advertising secular or non-Catholic programming. Its traditional plea for donations is "Keep us between your gas and electric bill". (Note: According to Father Andrew Apostoli, TV host of EWTN: Sunday Night Prime, the saying is derived from the practice of Mother Angelica asking Jesus Christ for financial help, by placing a letter of request between the gas and electric bill (sometimes gas and telephone bill). The saying was later adopted for benefactors who donate to EWTN, in response to propagating its ministry.) Mother Angelica developed the fund raising slogan for viewers, "Please keep us between your gas and electric bill!"

== History of programming ==
EWTN was founded by Mother Angelica, PCPA, in 1980 and began broadcasting on August 15, 1981, from a garage studio at the Our Lady of the Angels Monastery in Irondale, Alabama, which Mother Angelica founded in 1962.

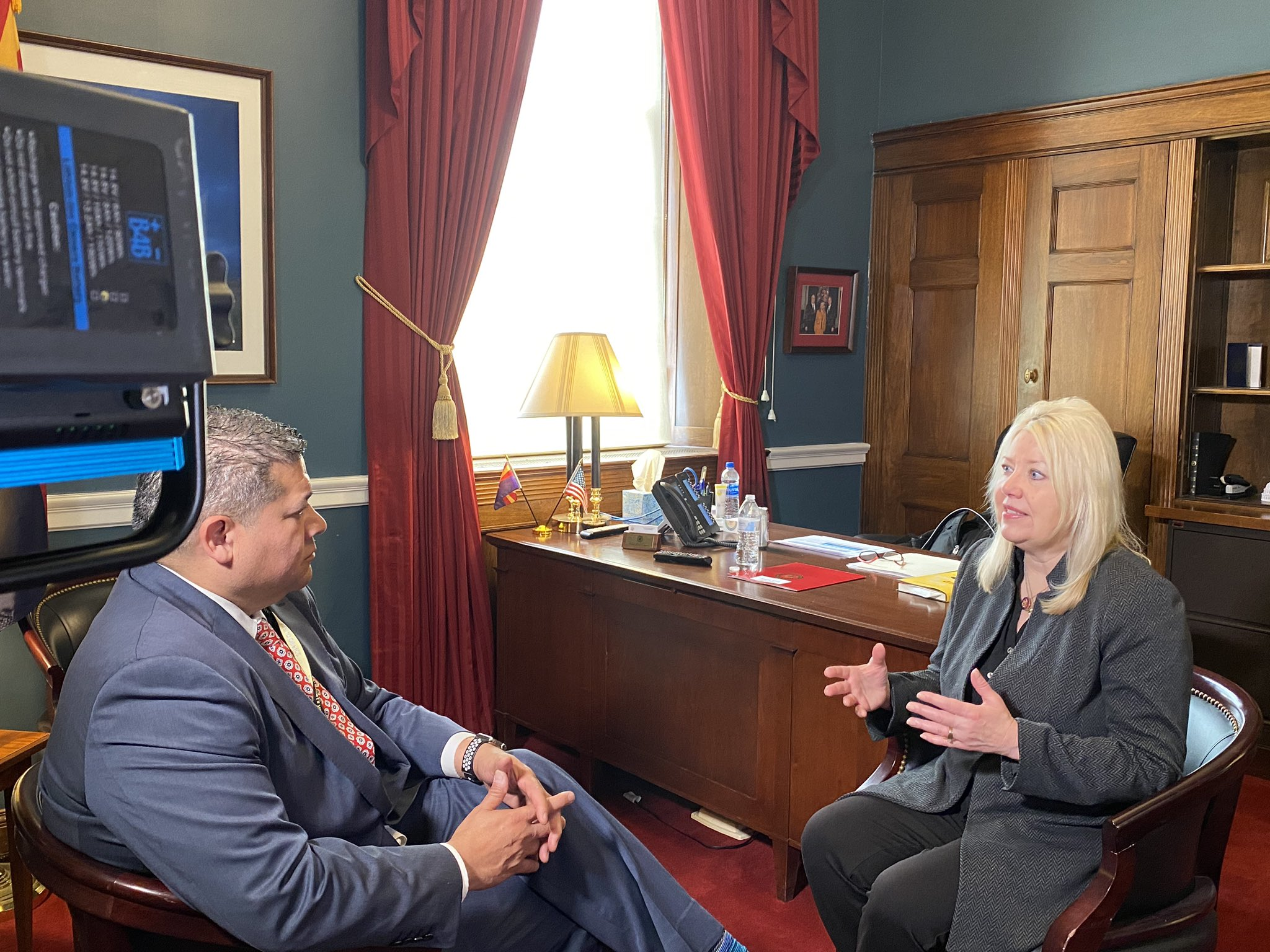
Capitol Hill reporter Erik Rosales interviewing Congresswoman Debbie Lesko in 2020

Mother Angelica hosted her own show, Mother Angelica Live, until suffering a major stroke and other health issues in September 2001. Repeats now air as either the Best of Mother Angelica Live or Mother Angelica Live Classics. From then until her death on Easter Sunday of 2016, she led a cloistered life at the Shrine of the Most Blessed Sacrament in Hanceville, Alabama.

In its early history, EWTN broadcast Catholic programming from a great variety of Catholic sources, which ranged from Catholic charismatic programming, such as that of Fr. Michael Manning, to programs focusing on social reform and social justice, such as Christopher Closeup, to doctrinal programs hosted by clergy. The network began broadcasting daily rosary broadcasts in 1987 and daily Mass in 1991.

In the early 1990s, EWTN began producing more of its own programs. This effort marked a conspicuously conservative shift in its overall orientation, with programs on topics of social reform and justice gradually eliminated and replaced by programs on doctrine and programs of dialogue. The shift was apparent in the daily televised Masses, which, in 1992, began incorporating Latin into the liturgy and gradually eliminated contemporary music. Some untelevised Masses are totally in English and some include more contemporary music. On Christmas Eve of 1993, Mother Angelica and the nuns of her order reverted to traditional habits. From 1992 on, the Latin portions of the Mass included the Gloria, introduction of the Gospel readings, the Sanctus, and the remainder of the Mass after the Great Amen, beginning with the Lord's Prayer.

Among its notable weekly programs are The Journey Home and Life on the Rock. The Journey Home, hosted by Marcus Grodi, presents converts to the Catholic Faith. Grodi is a former Presbyterian minister who converted to the Catholic Faith in 1992. Although most guests are former Protestants, former members of non-Christian faiths (such as Judaism) and former atheists occasionally appear. Life on the Rock is hosted by Rev. Mark Mary, MFVA.

The HD feed first became available to Comcast customers in Richmond, Virginia, and its vicinity on May 11, 2010.

In October 2011, EWTN became available through the Roku streaming player. The player provides six live channels of EWTN at no cost, including English, Spanish, and German languages, thus permitting users to view the channel on their televisions. In addition, select EWTN programs can be viewed through the video on demand option, and a live feed of EWTN Radio is available.

Often, EWTN airs special programming – holiday-specific programs; coverage of the deaths of Supreme Pontiffs; Papal conclaves, Papal elections, inaugurations, and visits; Christmas Eve, Christmas Day, and Easter Masses; installations of bishops, archbishops, and cardinals; and World Youth Days.

EWTN's top news program, EWTN News Nightly, is hosted by Veronica Dudo and features correspondents Erik Rosales, Owen T. Jensen, Mark Irons and Colm Flynn. It was previously anchored by Lauren Ashburn, who in turn succeeded founding anchor and journalist Colleen Carroll Campbell, and Tracy Sabol.

== World Youth Day, postitions and Apostolic visitation ==
=== World Youth Day (1993) ===
Until 1993, EWTN head Mother Angelica showed little propensity for politically conservative culture warfare, stating for example on October 27, 1992, "I believe people should vote pro-life, but life is everything: the elderly, the born, the unborn, all of us." However, in a 1993 episode of Mother Angelica Live broadcast live from World Youth Day 1993, Mother Angelica harshly criticized a mimed re-enactment of the Stations of the Cross where a woman played Jesus, which Pope John Paul II did not attend. Mother Angelica denounced the display as "an abomination to the Eternal Father" and proceeded with a half-hour criticism of the "liberal church in America" and the post Second Vatican Council reforms. "I'm so tired of you, liberal church in America [...] Your whole purpose is to destroy [...] It's time somebody said something about all these tiny little cracks that you have been putting for the last 30 years into the church." Among other things she opined that "We're just tired of you constantly pushing anti-God, anti-Catholic and pagan ways into the Catholic Church. Leave us alone. Don't pour your poison, your venom, on all the church."

Then-Archbishop of Milwaukee Rembert Weakland criticized Mother Angelica's comment as "one of the most disgraceful, un-Christian, offensive, and divisive diatribes I have ever heard". Mother Angelica responded that "He didn't think a woman playing Jesus was offensive? He can go put his head in the back toilet as far as I am concerned!" The event is believed by some (National Catholic Reporter) to mark Mother Angelica's emergence "as a culture warrior", as prior to it she had sometimes "criticized feminists" but "rarely, if ever, attacked the ecclesiastical hierarchy". Following the attack, "Mother Angelica and the sisters in her convent abandoned their modified post-Vatican II habits in favor of the pre-Vatican II style."

In 1997, Mother Angelica publicly criticized Cardinal Roger Mahony, then Archbishop of the Archdiocese of Los Angeles, for his pastoral letter on the Eucharist, "Gather Faithfully Together: A Guide for Sunday Mass", which she perceived as lacking emphasis on transubstantiation (the presence of Christ in the Eucharist): "I'm afraid my obedience in that diocese would be absolutely zero. And I hope everybody else's in that diocese is zero". Cardinal Mahony regarded her comments as accusing him of heresy. Mother Angelica later conditionally apologized for her comments.

In 1999, Bishop David E. Foley of the Diocese of Birmingham, Alabama, issued a decree prohibiting priests in his diocese from celebrating Mass ad orientem (which literally denotes 'to the east', which refers to the priest having their back to the congregation) under most circumstances. Although the decree did not specifically name EWTN, supporters and critics generally agreed that the decree, which applied to "any Mass that is or will be televised for broadcast or videotaped for public dissemination", was authored specifically to target EWTN. Bishop Foley stated that the practice of the priest celebrating ad orientem "amounts to making a political statement and is dividing the people."

=== Apostolic Visitation (2000) ===
In 2000, Archbishop Roberto González Nieves of San Juan, Puerto Rico, performed an apostolic visitation of EWTN. Nieves focused on three issues – the actual ownership of the network; the associated monastery's right to donate property to EWTN; and, since she had never been elected, the authority of Mother Angelica. However, before Nieves could write his final report, Mother Angelica resigned from her positions as EWTN CEO and board chair. According to Global Sisters Report, a final report by Nieves was never issued, and "even today, outsiders know little about what occurred". When asked about the visitation by Global Sisters Report, "EWTN did not respond".

=== Conflict with Pope Francis ===
In March 2021, Pope Francis reportedly told the EWTN reporter and cameraman on board a papal flight to Iraq that the network "should stop bad-mouthing me," according to a report in the Jesuit magazine America. On a 2021 trip to Slovakia, Francis complained in a "meeting with Jesuits" that "a large Catholic television channel that has no hesitation in continually speaking ill of the pope," and that "they are the work of the devil [...] I have also said this to some of them." In reply, archbishop emeritus Charles J. Chaput, who "led the archdiocese of Philadelphia and who is a former EWTN board member", stated that "any suggestion that EWTN is unfaithful to the Church" is "simply vindictive and false."

Recurring guests on the weekly EWTN show "The World Over", hosted by EWTN anchor Raymond Arroyo, include:

[...] prominent Francis critics, including Cardinal Raymond Burke, who co-signed a list of dubia about Pope Francis' openness to allowing divorced and remarried Catholics to receive Communion in some cases, and Cardinal Gerhard Müller, the former head of the Vatican's Congregation for the Doctrine of the Faith, who was not renewed for another term by Pope Francis in 2017. Two years later, Cardinal Müller published a "manifesto of faith" in the EWTN-owned Catholic News Agency and other outlets that have been critical of the pope, arguing against Francis' teaching on Communion for the divorced and remarried.

Other guests include Archbishop Carlo Maria Viganò, who has called on the pope to resign. EWTN also features a group calling itself "The Papal Posse" – which includes along with Raymond Arroyo, the Rev. Gerald Murray (a New York priest, former U.S. Navy chaplain and canon lawyer), and Robert Royal (a Catholic author who founded the D.C. think tank the Faith and Reason Institute and the blog "The Catholic Thing") – that according to Colleen Dulle of America magazine, "riffs on one another's criticisms of the pope and has given uncritical interviews to anti-Francis guests like Steve Bannon, who argued on air that his own populist politics better represent Catholic social teaching than Pope Francis does".

=== Francis Mary Stone ===
In 2007, Francis Mary Stone, an ordained Catholic priest who hosted the network's show Life On The Rock, was suspended from the network after it was revealed that he violated his vow of celibate chastity and fathered a child with EWTN employee Christina Presnell. Stone was forced on leave of absence, and Presnell was fired from EWTN. By 2018, he was reported to be suspended from his religious order.

=== Gloria Purvis ===
The network's "Morning Glory" show was a radio program hosted by Gloria Purvis and Deacon Harold Burke-Sivers (both African American), and Msgr Charles Pope, among other guest hosts. In the wake of the murder of George Floyd, Purvis became known for defending anti-racist measures around the country in response. Listeners from EWTN's largest radio affiliate, Guadalupe Radio Network, complained about the alleged "conflicts" and GRN suspended the show in response, making headlines in Catholic media and elsewhere. Purvis was interviewed by the New York Times concerning the controversy, and EWTN initially expressed support for her and said the show would continue to be produced despite the suspension (which was in fact permanent). In December 2020, however, the network canceled the show without explanation, occasioning accusations of racism. By 2021 Purvis had been hired, by an EWTN competitor, to produce her own podcast affiliated with the U.S. Catholic publisher America.

== Viewership ==
EWTN is the largest religious media network in the world, and it says it has a reach of a quarter-billion people in 140 countries. EWTN had an annual revenue of $64,946,744 in 2019, and has received an 84.3 (out of 100) overall score and rating from Charity Navigator.

In 2025, Reuters noted that, "EWTN's U.S. cable audience swells during coverage of Easter Sunday Mass and other special events, but is relatively small on a day-to-day basis, reaching an average of 21,500 daily U.S. households in 2024. That's about the same as five years earlier, according to Comscore data. It draws additional viewers on its website, where visitors can stream content for free - roughly 174,000 average monthly unique viewers in 2024 - and reaches another 3.4 million subscribers and followers through its social media platforms". EWTN is also available on demand on streaming services Roku, Kindle, and Apple TV. EWTN's website is viewed three to four million times monthly, according to SimilarWeb. In 2025, after the death of Pope Francis, "Comscore said more than 40,000 U.S. households watched Francis' funeral on EWTN's cable channel, compared to more than 1 million on the ABC television network. An EWTN spokesperson said online streaming in English and Spanish combined had generated 30 million YouTube views since Francis' death."

In 2026, EWTN reaches an estimated 425 million viewers in over 160 countries.

== List of programs ==
- EWTN News Nightly, on Mondays through Fridays
- EWTN News In Depth, on Fridays
- EWTN Pro Life Weekly, on Wednesdays
- EWTN Vaticano, on Sundays and available On-Demand
- The Journey Home – Marcus Grodi, on Mondays
- Threshold of Hope – Fr. Mitch Pacwa, SJ, on Tuesdays
- EWTN Live – Fr. Mitch Pacwa, SJ, on Wednesdays
- The World Over Live – Raymond Arroyo, on Thursdays
- Life on the Rock – Fr. Mark Mary and Br. John Therese on Fridays
- The Daily Mass, on daily mornings
- Sunday Mass, on Sunday mornings
- Benedictions and Devotions, on Sundays
- The Holy Rosary with Mother Angelica
- The Holy Rosary in the Holy Land
- At Home with Jim and Joy – Jim and Joy Pinto
- Web of Faith – Fr. John Trigilio and Fr. Robert Levis
- Sunday Night Prime – Fr. Andrew Apostoli, CFR, on Sunday Nights
- EWTN Bookmark – Doug Keck
- Mother Angelica Live Classics
- EWTN Religious Catalogue
- Angel Force – LaHood Family
- The Knights of St. Michael – LaHood Family
- My Little Angels
- We Are Catholic
- The Chaplet of the Divine Mercy
- My Catholic Family
- The Carpenter's Shop
- Adventures in Odyssey
- The Joy of Music – concert organist Diane Bish
- Pope Fiction – Patrick Madrid
- Christ in the City with Fr. George Rutler
- Pequeño Jesús
- Now That We Are Catholic
- Jesus Christ – True God / True Man – Raymond D'Souza
- G. K. Chesterton: Apostle of Common Sense – Dale Ahlquist
- Household of Faith – Kristine Franklin and Rosalind Moss
- The Abundant Life – Johnette Benkovic
- Does the Church Still Teach This? – Fr. Shannon Collins, FME
- Catholics Coming Home – Msgr. Frank E. Bognanno
- Defending Life – Fr. Frank Pavone and Janet Morana
- Forgotten Heritage – Fr. Owen Gorman and Fr. John S. Hogan ocds
- Catholicism on Campus – Msgr. Stuart Swetland
- Finding God through Faith and Reason – Fr. Robert Spitzer, SJ, Ph. D.
- The Pure Life – Jason Evert and Crystallina Evert
- Crash Course in Catholicism – Fr. John Trigilio and Fr. Ken Brighenti
- The Quest for Shakespeare – Joseph Pearce
- Reasons for our Hope – Rosalind Moss
- Council of Faith: The Documents of Vatican II – Fr. John Trigilio
- Council of Faith: The Post-Consiliar Documents – Fr. John Trigilio
- Super Saints – Bob and Penny Lord
- The Friar
- Genesis to Jesus – Scott Hahn and Rob Corzine

== Branding ==
The logo of EWTN has incorporated a globe outline in some form since the network's launch in 1981 to suggest the network's hope of a worldwide reach, usually with an outline of the dome of Saint Peter's Basilica within a profile of a satellite dish inside of it.

The network had the sub-branding of the "Catholic Cable Network" until 1995, when with the American launch of DirecTV and Dish direct satellite broadcasters (where it was a charter network with both providers) it took a new sub-branding of "International Catholic Network", then "Global Catholic Network" in 1996 as it began to move towards satellite, then to the current day, Internet-based broadcasting worldwide.

== List of broadcast television affiliates ==
- K14RB-D channel 14.2, Minneapolis/Saint Paul, Minnesota
- WORO-DT channel 13.2, Fajardo/San Juan, Puerto Rico
- KDEO-LD channel 23.1, Denver, Colorado
- W09DJ-D channel 8.1, Wilkes-Barre/Scranton, Pennsylvania
- K17KW-D channel 17.1, Gettysburg/Pierre, South Dakota

== See also ==
- Cadena COPE
- Catholic Answers
- Catholic Media Network
- Catholic News Agency
- Catholic television channels
- Catholic television networks
- Catholic Television of Nigeria
- Catholic TV (Pakistan)
- CatholicTV
- H2onews
- Holy See Press Office
- International religious television broadcasters
- KTO (TV channel)
- List of international religious radio broadcasters
- National Catholic Register (owned by EWTN)
- Padre Pio TV
- Radio Maria
- Salt + Light Television
- Telepace
- TV2000
- Vatican Media
- Vatican Radio
- Zenit News Agency
