= Irondale, Alabama =

City in Alabama, United States

Irondale
- City
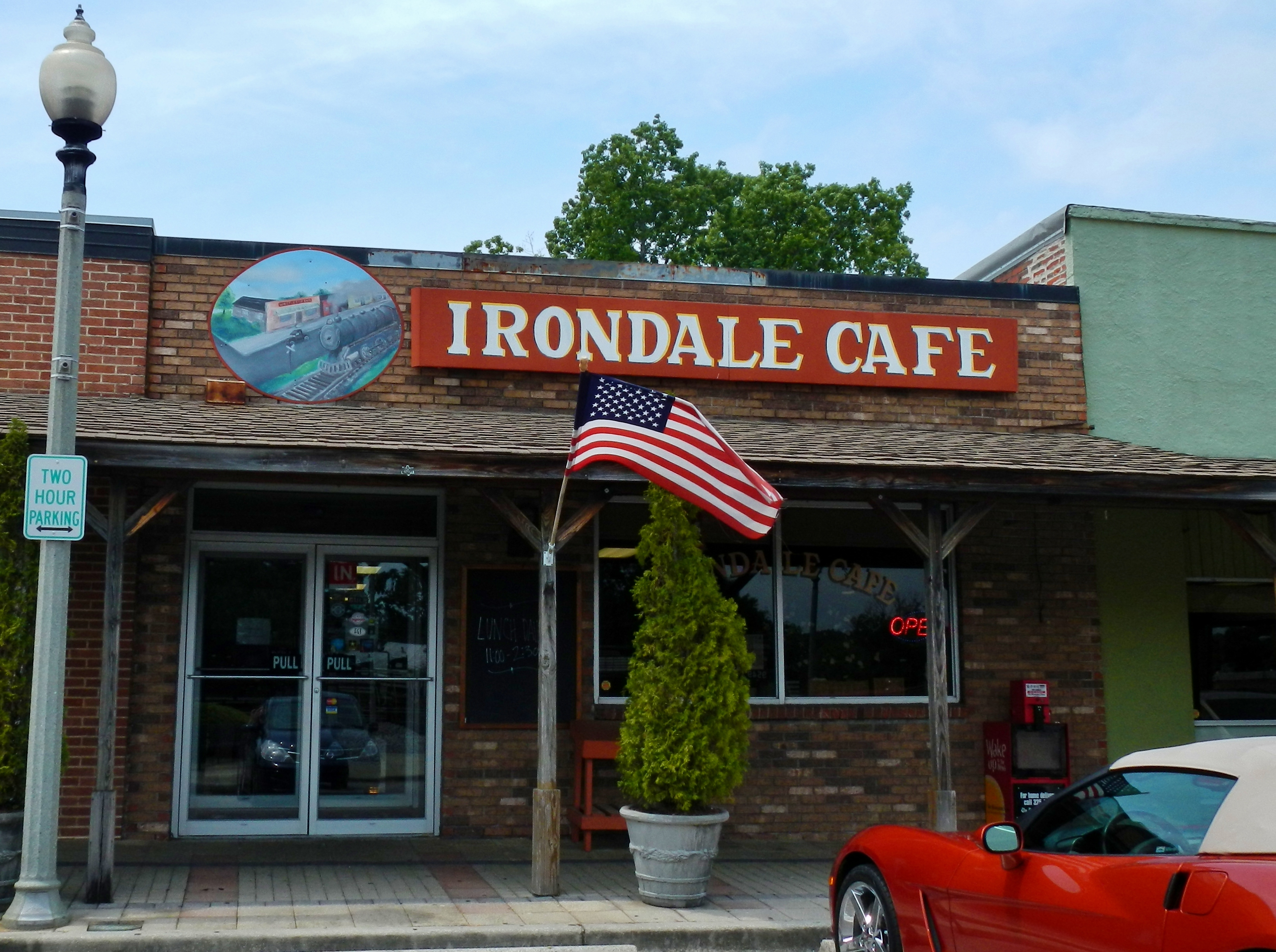
- The Irondale Cafe

- Flag Seal

- Location of Irondale in Jefferson County, Alabama.
- Coordinates: 33°32′40″N 86°38′05″W
- Country: United States
- State: Alabama
- County: Jefferson
- Established: October 19, 1887

Government
  - Type: Mayor-Council

Area
  - Total: 17.48 sq mi (45.28 km^{2})
  - Land: 17.32 sq mi (44.85 km^{2})
  - Water: 0.17 sq mi (0.44 km^{2})
- Elevation: 922 ft (281 m)

Population (2020)
  - Total: 13,497
  - Density: 779.5/sq mi (300.96/km^{2})
- Time zone: UTC-6 (Central (CST))
  - Summer (DST): UTC-5 (CDT)
- ZIP code: 35210
- Area codes: 205 & 659
- FIPS code: 01-37864
- GNIS feature ID: 2404765
- Website: cityofirondaleal.gov

Irondale is a city in Jefferson County, Alabama, United States. It is a suburb of Birmingham, northeast of Homewood and Mountain Brook. At the 2020 census, the population was 13,497.

The city is the site of Catholic radio/television broadcaster Eternal Word Television Network, or (EWTN). The city's annual Whistle-Stop Festival attracts thousands to its eclectic mix of art, food and music.

== History ==
On October 5, 1887, the people of Irondale petitioned for incorporation. The town incorporated as Irondale (after Irondale Furnace) on October 19, 1887, following a vote on October 17, 1887. In 1891, Golden Rule Bar-B-Q, the oldest restaurant in Alabama, was founded in Irondale.

The 1916 Irondale earthquake, magnitude 5.1, caused some damage in the area, and was felt in neighboring states.

In 1981, Mother Angelica founded the Eternal Word Television Network, after starting operations in a garage.

On August 25, 2020, Irondale voters elected James D. Stewart Jr. as the first black mayor in the city's history.

== Geography ==
According to the U.S. Census Bureau, the city has a total area of 9.0 square miles (23 km^{2}), of which 9.0 square miles (23 km^{2}) is land and 0.11% is water.

== Demographics ==
Historical population
Census	Pop.	Note	%±
1900	525		—
1910	572		9.0%
1920	809		41.4%
1930	1,517		87.5%
1940	1,486		−2.0%
1950	1,876		26.2%
1960	3,501		86.6%
1970	3,166		−9.6%
1980	6,510		105.6%
1990	9,454		45.2%
2000	9,813		3.8%
2010	12,349		25.8%
2020	13,497		9.3%
2025 (est.)	13,545	▲	0.4%
U.S. Decennial Census

=== Racial and ethnic composition ===
Irondale city, Alabama – Racial and ethnic composition Note: the US Census treats Hispanic/Latino as an ethnic category. This table excludes Latinos from the racial categories and assigns them to a separate category. Hispanics/Latinos may be of any race.
Race / Ethnicity (NH = Non-Hispanic)	Pop 2000	Pop 2010	Pop 2020	% 2000	% 2010	% 2020
White alone (NH)	6,889	6,670	7,183	70.20%	54.01%	53.22%
Black or African American alone (NH)	2,464	4,357	4,032	25.11%	35.28%	29.87%
Native American or Alaska Native alone (NH)	13	26	16	0.13%	0.21%	0.12%
Asian alone (NH)	91	177	211	0.93%	1.43%	1.56%
Native Hawaiian or Pacific Islander alone (NH)	2	1	4	0.02%	0.01%	0.03%
Other race alone (NH)	6	15	28	0.06%	0.12%	0.21%
Mixed race or Multiracial (NH)	85	142	458	0.87%	1.15%	3.39%
Hispanic or Latino (any race)	263	961	1,565	2.68%	7.78%	11.60%
Total	9,813	12,349	13,497	100.00%	100.00%	100.00%

=== 2020 census ===
As of the 2020 census, Irondale had a population of 13,497 and 3,022 families. The median age was 39.3 years. 18.2% of residents were under the age of 18 and 18.0% of residents were 65 years of age or older. For every 100 females there were 90.9 males, and for every 100 females age 18 and over there were 89.0 males age 18 and over.

94.9% of residents lived in urban areas, while 5.1% lived in rural areas.

There were 5,874 households in Irondale, of which 23.7% had children under the age of 18 living in them. Of all households, 38.9% were married-couple households, 20.2% were households with a male householder and no spouse or partner present, and 34.6% were households with a female householder and no spouse or partner present. About 33.2% of all households were made up of individuals and 11.8% had someone living alone who was 65 years of age or older.

There were 6,319 housing units, of which 7.0% were vacant. The homeowner vacancy rate was 1.2% and the rental vacancy rate was 9.9%.

Racial composition as of the 2020 census
Race	Number	Percent
White	7,633	56.6%
Black or African American	4,064	30.1%
American Indian and Alaska Native	42	0.3%
Asian	217	1.6%
Native Hawaiian and Other Pacific Islander	4	0.0%
Some other race	729	5.4%
Two or more races	808	6.0%
Hispanic or Latino (of any race)	1,565	11.6%

=== 2010 census ===
According to the 2010 census results, the population of the area was approximately 12,349 people. From 2000 to 2010, Irondale's population growth percentage was 25.8% (or from 9,813 people to 12,349 people). 23.1% of the Irondale city residents were under 18 years of age. Census 2010 race data for Irondale city include the racial breakdown percentages of 56.33% white, 35.38% black, 1.43% Asian and 7.78% Hispanic. Also, there were 5,495 housing units in Irondale city, 92.5% of which were occupied housing units.

== Education ==
Irondale is served by Jefferson County Board of Education and is home to Shades Valley High School, Grantswood Community School, Irondale Community School, Irondale Middle School, Shades Valley Theatre Academy, Jefferson Christian Academy, and the Jefferson County International Baccalaureate School.

== Notable people ==
- Fannie Flagg, author of best-selling 1987 novel Fried Green Tomatoes at the Whistle Stop Cafe, used Irondale as the location of the Irondale Cafe
- Marion Hobby, former NFL defensive line coach

== Gallery ==
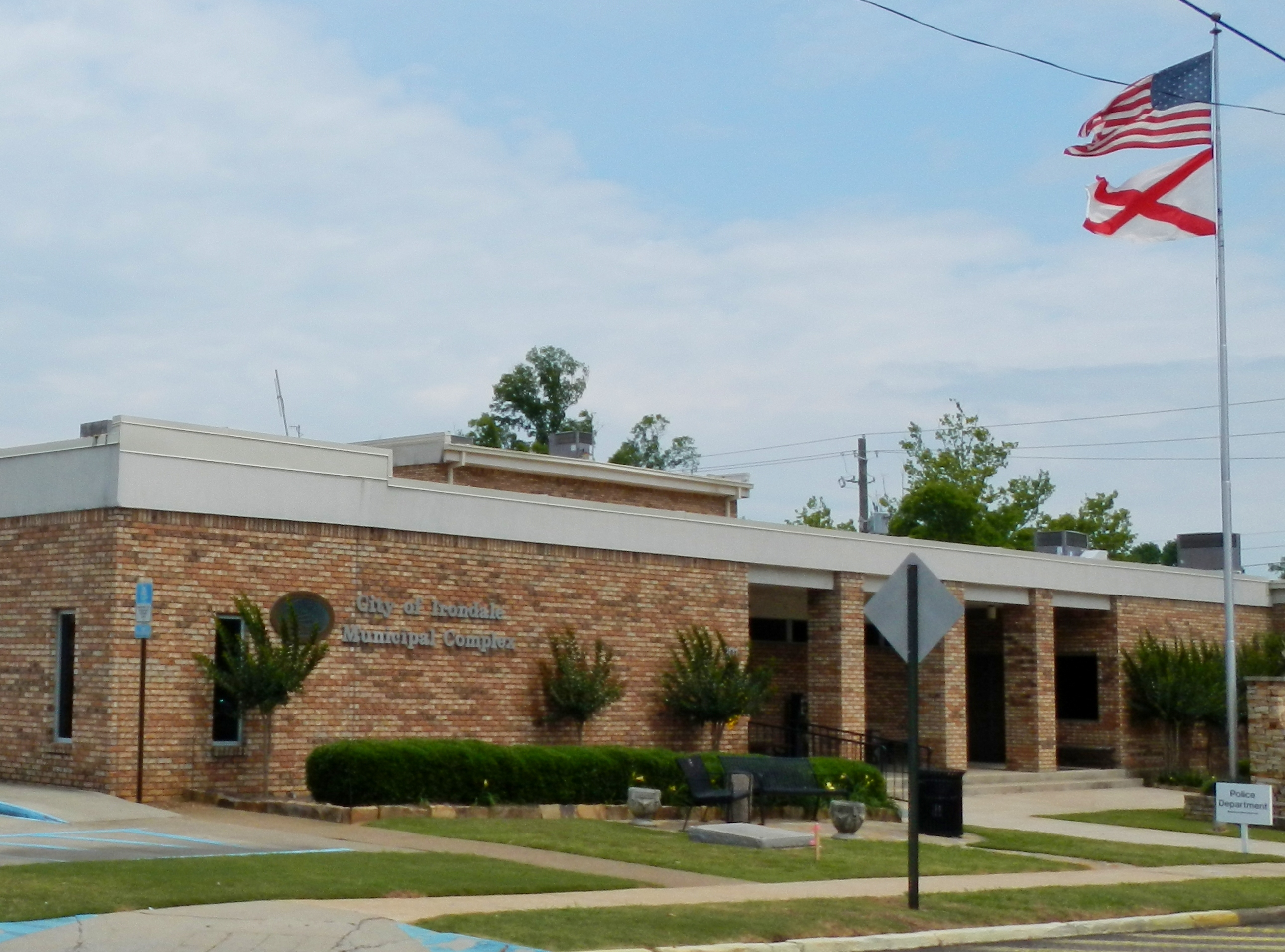
Irondale Municipal Complex

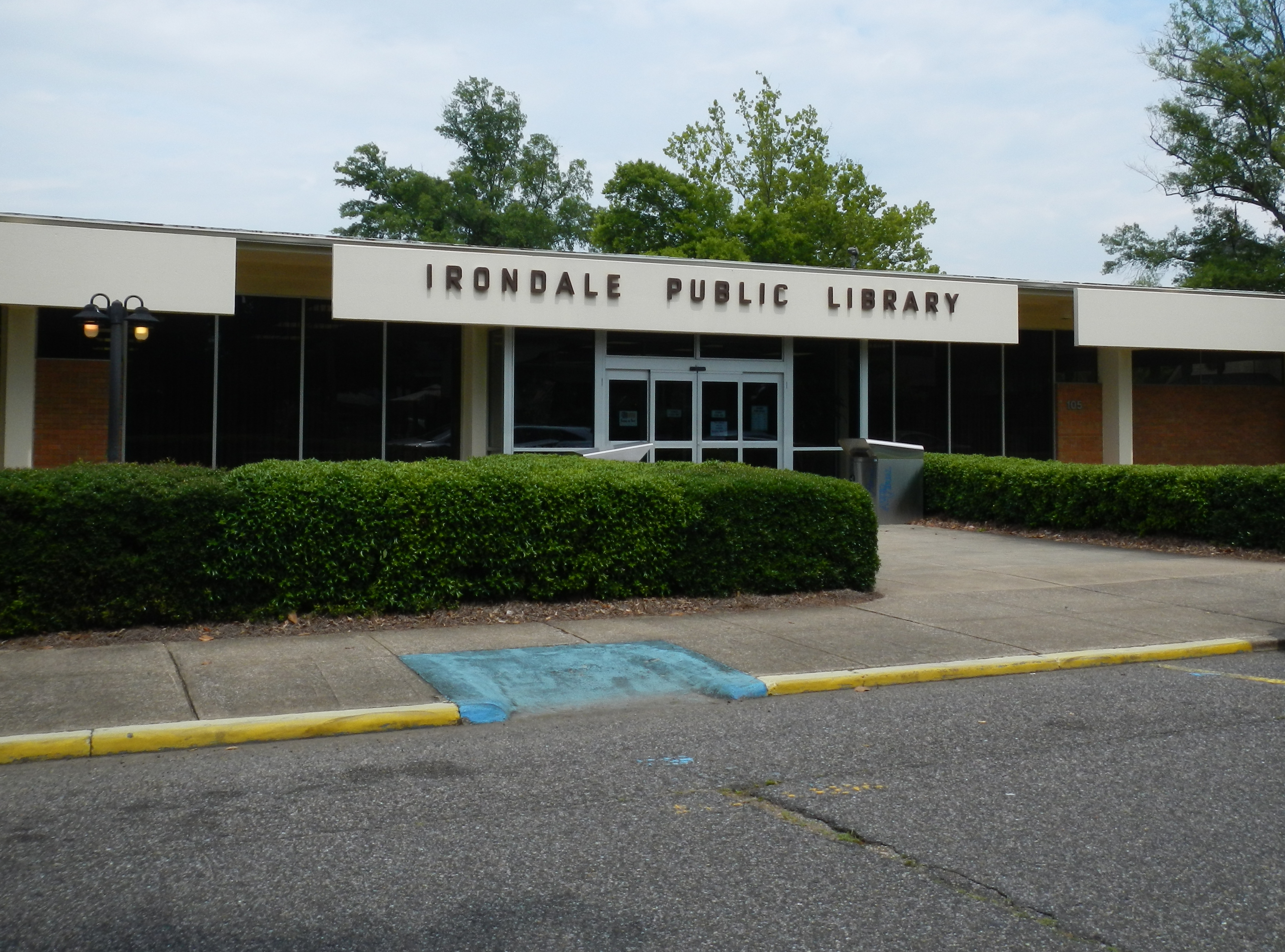
Irondale Public Library

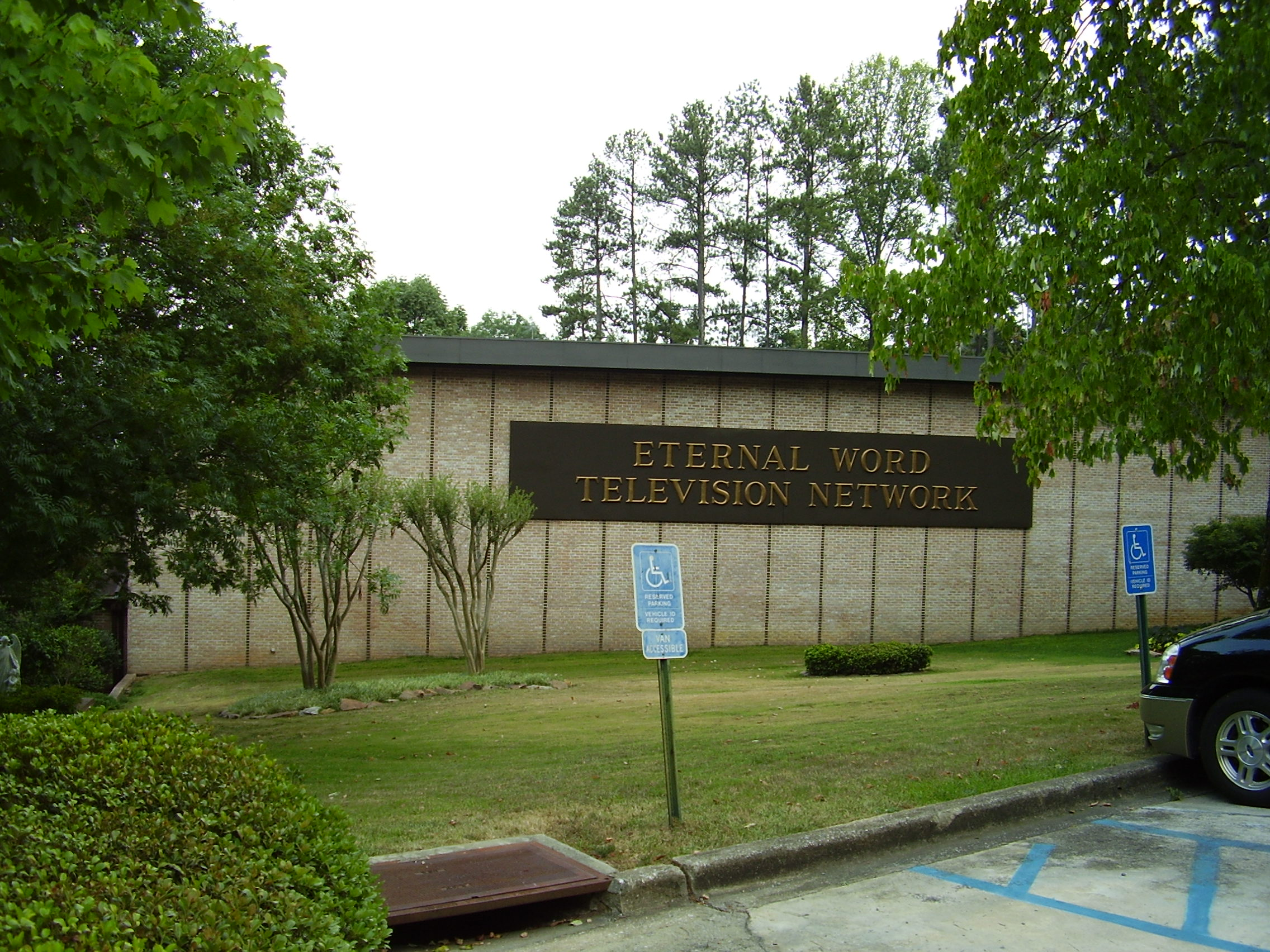
The studio of the Eternal Word Television Network (EWTN).
