= Hanceville, Alabama =

City in Alabama, United States

- City
- Flag Seal
- Motto(s): A positive & progressive community
- Location of Hanceville in Cullman County, Alabama.
- Coordinates: 34°3′48″N 86°45′39″W
- Country: United States
- State: Alabama
- County: Cullman

Government
  - Mayor: Nolan Bradford

Area
  - Total: 4.39 sq mi (11.36 km^{2})
  - Land: 4.37 sq mi (11.32 km^{2})
  - Water: 0.015 sq mi (0.04 km^{2})
- Elevation: 548 ft (167 m)

Population (2020)
  - Total: 3,217
  - Density: 736.0/sq mi (284.17/km^{2})
- Time zone: UTC-6 (Central (CST))
  - Summer (DST): UTC-5 (CDT)
- ZIP code: 35077
- Area code: 256
- FIPS code: 01-32968
- GNIS feature ID: 2403793
- Website: cityofhanceville.net

Hanceville is a city in Cullman County, Alabama, United States. At the 2020 census, the population was 3,217.

== History ==
Originally founded in Blount County, Hanceville was established in 1832 as the Town of Gilmore and was fully incorporated by May of 1879. Hanceville was named in the honor of Hance Kinney, the father of the town's postmaster in 1879. At the time of Cullman County's creation in 1877, half of Hanceville resided in each county. In 1885, county boundaries were redrawn and all of Hanceville was placed within Blount County. In 1901, county boundaries were redrawn again and this time all of the town was placed within Cullman County, in which it has remained.

== Geography ==
Hanceville is located in southeastern Cullman County. U.S. Route 31 passes through the city, leading north 9 miles (14 km) to Cullman, the county seat, and south 14 miles (23 km) to Smoke Rise.

According to the U.S. Census Bureau, the city has a total area of 4.2 square miles (10.9 km^{2}), of which 0.02 square miles (0.04 km^{2}), or 0.34%, is water.

=== Climate ===
Climate data for Hanceville, Alabama, 1991–2020 normals, extremes 2003–present
Month	Jan	Feb	Mar	Apr	May	Jun	Jul	Aug	Sep	Oct	Nov	Dec	Year
Record high °F (°C)	77 (25)	80 (27)	88 (31)	91 (33)	94 (34)	100 (38)	100 (38)	106 (41)	97 (36)	97 (36)	87 (31)	76 (24)	106 (41)
Mean maximum °F (°C)	69.9 (21.1)	72.7 (22.6)	79.5 (26.4)	83.9 (28.8)	88.7 (31.5)	93.4 (34.1)	95.3 (35.2)	95.3 (35.2)	91.6 (33.1)	85.9 (29.9)	76.5 (24.7)	70.8 (21.6)	97.0 (36.1)
Mean daily maximum °F (°C)	50.9 (10.5)	55.1 (12.8)	63.5 (17.5)	71.7 (22.1)	78.5 (25.8)	85.0 (29.4)	88.2 (31.2)	88.1 (31.2)	83.4 (28.6)	72.9 (22.7)	62.2 (16.8)	53.5 (11.9)	71.1 (21.7)
Daily mean °F (°C)	40.3 (4.6)	43.6 (6.4)	51.4 (10.8)	58.9 (14.9)	66.7 (19.3)	74.0 (23.3)	77.7 (25.4)	77.1 (25.1)	71.8 (22.1)	60.3 (15.7)	49.4 (9.7)	42.7 (5.9)	59.5 (15.3)
Mean daily minimum °F (°C)	29.7 (−1.3)	32.1 (0.1)	39.3 (4.1)	46.2 (7.9)	54.9 (12.7)	63.1 (17.3)	67.2 (19.6)	66.0 (18.9)	60.2 (15.7)	47.7 (8.7)	36.7 (2.6)	31.8 (−0.1)	47.9 (8.9)
Mean minimum °F (°C)	13.0 (−10.6)	17.5 (−8.1)	23.1 (−4.9)	31.3 (−0.4)	41.5 (5.3)	54.5 (12.5)	59.7 (15.4)	58.8 (14.9)	46.9 (8.3)	31.7 (−0.2)	20.9 (−6.2)	18.4 (−7.6)	11.5 (−11.4)
Record low °F (°C)	3 (−16)	5 (−15)	16 (−9)	26 (−3)	34 (1)	51 (11)	51 (11)	49 (9)	39 (4)	24 (−4)	14 (−10)	5 (−15)	3 (−16)
Average precipitation inches (mm)	5.81 (148)	5.77 (147)	5.78 (147)	5.57 (141)	4.91 (125)	4.73 (120)	4.67 (119)	3.86 (98)	3.89 (99)	3.58 (91)	4.58 (116)	5.83 (148)	58.98 (1,499)
Average snowfall inches (cm)	0.2 (0.51)	0.3 (0.76)	0.5 (1.3)	0.0 (0.0)	0.0 (0.0)	0.0 (0.0)	0.0 (0.0)	0.0 (0.0)	0.0 (0.0)	0.0 (0.0)	0.0 (0.0)	0.1 (0.25)	1.1 (2.82)
Average precipitation days (≥ 0.01 in)	9.2	9.1	9.8	8.2	8.9	9.1	9.9	7.9	6.0	6.0	7.4	9.4	100.9
Average snowy days (≥ 0.1 in)	0.3	0.3	0.1	0.0	0.0	0.0	0.0	0.0	0.0	0.0	0.0	0.1	0.8
Source 1: NOAA
Source 2: National Weather Service (mean maxima/minima 2006–2020)

== Demographics ==
Historical population
Census	Pop.	Note	%±
1880	150		—
1910	464		—
1920	441		−5.0%
1930	780		76.9%
1940	650		−16.7%
1950	775		19.2%
1960	1,174		51.5%
1970	2,027		72.7%
1980	2,220		9.5%
1990	2,246		1.2%
2000	2,951		31.4%
2010	2,982		1.1%
2020	3,217		7.9%
U.S. Decennial Census; 2013 Estimate

=== Racial and ethnic composition ===
Hanceville city, Alabama – Racial and ethnic composition Note: the US Census treats Hispanic/Latino as an ethnic category. This table excludes Latinos from the racial categories and assigns them to a separate category. Hispanics/Latinos may be of any race. Race and ethnicity were not reported in Alabama for populations under 2,500 in 1980 and under 1,000 in 1990.
Race / Ethnicity (NH = Non-Hispanic)	Pop 1990	Pop 2000	Pop 2010	Pop 2020	% 1990	% 2000	% 2010	% 2020
White alone (NH)	2,211	2,705	2,720	2,786	98.44%	91.66%	91.21%	86.60%
Black or African American alone (NH)	8	135	106	122	0.36%	4.57%	3.55%	3.79%
Native American or Alaska Native alone (NH)	4	14	7	18	0.18%	0.47%	0.23%	0.56%
Asian alone (NH)	6	2	22	13	0.27%	0.07%	0.74%	0.40%
Native Hawaiian or Pacific Islander alone (NH)	x	1	1	0	x	0.03%	0.03%	0.00%
Other race alone (NH)	0	1	7	9	0.00%	0.03%	0.23%	0.28%
Mixed race or Multiracial (NH)	x	25	46	118	x	0.85%	1.54%	3.67%
Hispanic or Latino (any race)	17	68	73	151	0.76%	2.30%	2.45%	4.69%
Total	2,426	2,951	2,982	3,217	100.00%	100.00%	100.00%	100.00%

=== 2020 census ===
As of the 2020 census, Hanceville had 3,217 people, 1,263 households, and 730 families. The population density was 789 inhabitants per square mile (305/km^{2}). The median age was 42.3 years. 17.3% of residents were under the age of 18 and 23.7% of residents were 65 years of age or older. For every 100 females there were 82.8 males, and for every 100 females age 18 and over there were 78.6 males age 18 and over.

0.0% of residents lived in urban areas, while 100.0% lived in rural areas.

There were 1,263 households in Hanceville, of which 25.0% had children under the age of 18 living in them. Of all households, 35.6% were married-couple households, 20.9% were households with a male householder and no spouse or partner present, and 36.9% were households with a female householder and no spouse or partner present. About 35.3% of all households were made up of individuals and 16.7% had someone living alone who was 65 years of age or older.

There were 1,451 housing units, of which 13.0% were vacant. The homeowner vacancy rate was 4.2% and the rental vacancy rate was 12.3%.

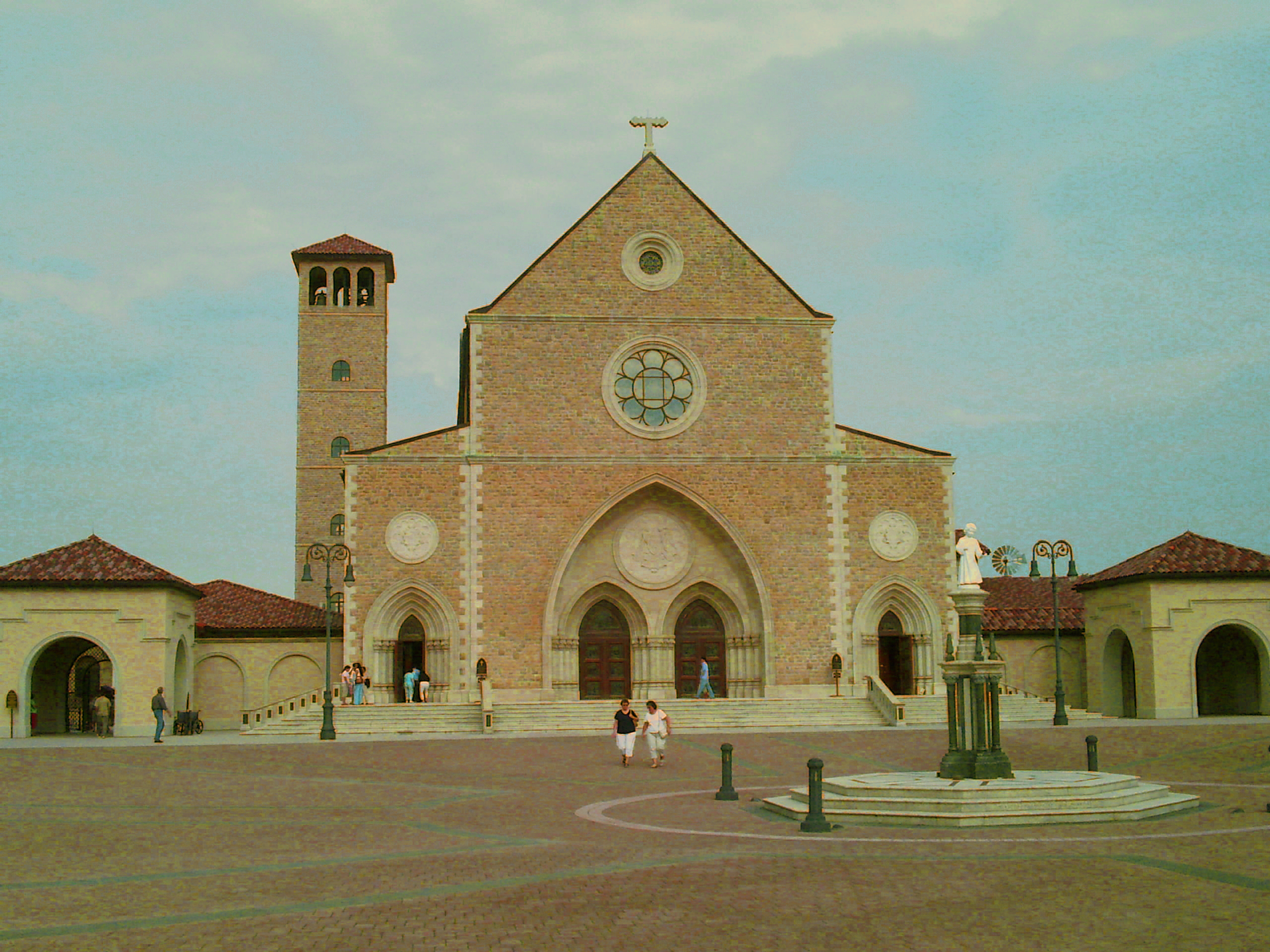
The Shrine of the Most Blessed Sacrament

=== 2010 census ===
At the 2010 census there were 2,982 people, 1,233 households, and 691 families living in the city. The population density was 733 inhabitants per square mile (283/km^{2}). There were 1,439 housing units at an average density of 340.2 per square mile (131.4/km^{2}). The racial makeup of the city was 92.4% White, 3.6% Black or African American, 0.2% Native American, 0.7% Asian, 0.0% Pacific Islander, 1.4% from other races, and 1.6% from two or more races. 2.4% of the population were Hispanic or Latino of any race. Of the 1,233 households 23.3% had children under the age of 18 living with them, 38.1% were married couples living together, 13.6% had a female householder with no husband present, and 44.0% were non-families. 37.1% of households were one person and 17.0% were one person aged 65 or older. The average household size was 2.26 and the average family size was 2.98.

The age distribution was 21.6% under the age of 18, 10.9% from 18 to 24, 22.5% from 25 to 44, 22.1% from 45 to 64, and 22.8% 65 or older. The median age was 40.0 years. For every 100 females, there were 83.1 males. For every 100 females age 18 and over, there were 95.2 males.

The median household income was $30,903 and the median family income was $45,560. Males had a median income of $34,338 versus $35,417 for females. The per capita income for the city was $16,078. About 14.5% of families and 24.2% of the population were below the poverty line, including 28.1% of those under age 18 and 9.8% of those age 65 or over.

=== 2000 census ===
At the 2000 census there were 2,951 people, 1,167 households, and 710 families living in the city. The population density was 718.6 inhabitants per square mile (277.5/km^{2}). There were 1,323 housing units at an average density of 322.2 per square mile (124.4/km^{2}). The racial makeup of the city was 93.09% White, 4.61% Black or African American, 0.61% Native American, 0.07% Asian, 0.03% Pacific Islander, 0.75% from other races, and 0.85% from two or more races. 2.30% of the population were Hispanic or Latino of any race. Of the 1,167 households 24.0% had children under the age of 18 living with them, 45.8% were married couples living together, 11.5% had a female householder with no husband present, and 39.1% were non-families. 32.6% of households were one person and 12.1% were one person aged 65 or older. The average household size was 2.23 and the average family size was 2.84.

The age distribution was 17.8% under the age of 18, 17.7% from 18 to 24, 22.0% from 25 to 44, 21.2% from 45 to 64, and 21.3% 65 or older. The median age was 38 years. For every 100 females, there were 87.5 males. For every 100 females age 18 and over, there were 80.8 males.

The median household income was $26,351 and the median family income was $35,370. Males had a median income of $31,439 versus $18,112 for females. The per capita income for the city was $13,371. About 12.5% of families and 21.9% of the population were below the poverty line, including 28.9% of those under age 18 and 13.5% of those age 65 or over.

== Attractions ==
Hanceville is home to Our Lady of the Angels Monastery. The construction began in 1996 and was completed in 1999, under the direction of Mother Angelica of the Eternal Word Television Network (EWTN).

Hanceville is also home to Alabama's oldest paintball and airsoft field, Mount Doom Paintball Field. It was opened in the 1980s, and closed in 2024 due to low popularity of paintball in the area.

== Police department scandal ==
On February 19, 2025, Cullman County's district attorney and sheriff announced a sweeping indictment of the Hanceville police chief, four other officers, and an officer's wife on drug distribution counts and other charges. The grand jury cited a culture of corruption so prevalent in the department that it recommended that the police force be disbanded. Its findings followed an investigation into the drug-induced death of a police department employee in August 2024. The probe discovered, among other concerns, that the department's staff had "unfettered access" to the evidence room, where "nothing was secure." On February 20, 2025, the mayor of Hanceville announced the immediate suspension of all police department employees and said law enforcement responsibilities would be turned over to the sheriff's office until further notice.

As a result of the corruption suspicions, 58 felony cases were dismissed by a grand jury.

== Education ==
Hanceville High School serves 342 students in grades 9–12. The school colors are purple and gold, and its mascot are the Bulldogs. It is a member of the Cullman County Board of Education. In 2001 the Lady Bulldogs basketball team won the Alabama High School Athletic Association Class 3A State Championship.

=== Colleges and universities ===
Wallace State Community College is the only college in the city. It opened in 1966 and has approximately 6,000 students.

== Notable people ==
- Mother Angelica, founder of the Eternal Word Television Network (EWTN)
- Allen Green, former NFL player
- Craig Kimbrel, closer for the Boston Red Sox
- Kip Moore, country music artist, attended college in Hanceville.
- Candi Staton, soul and gospel singer
- Bill Steltemeier, founding president of EWTN
