= Shrine of the Most Blessed Sacrament =

Catholic shrine in Hanceville, Alabama, United States

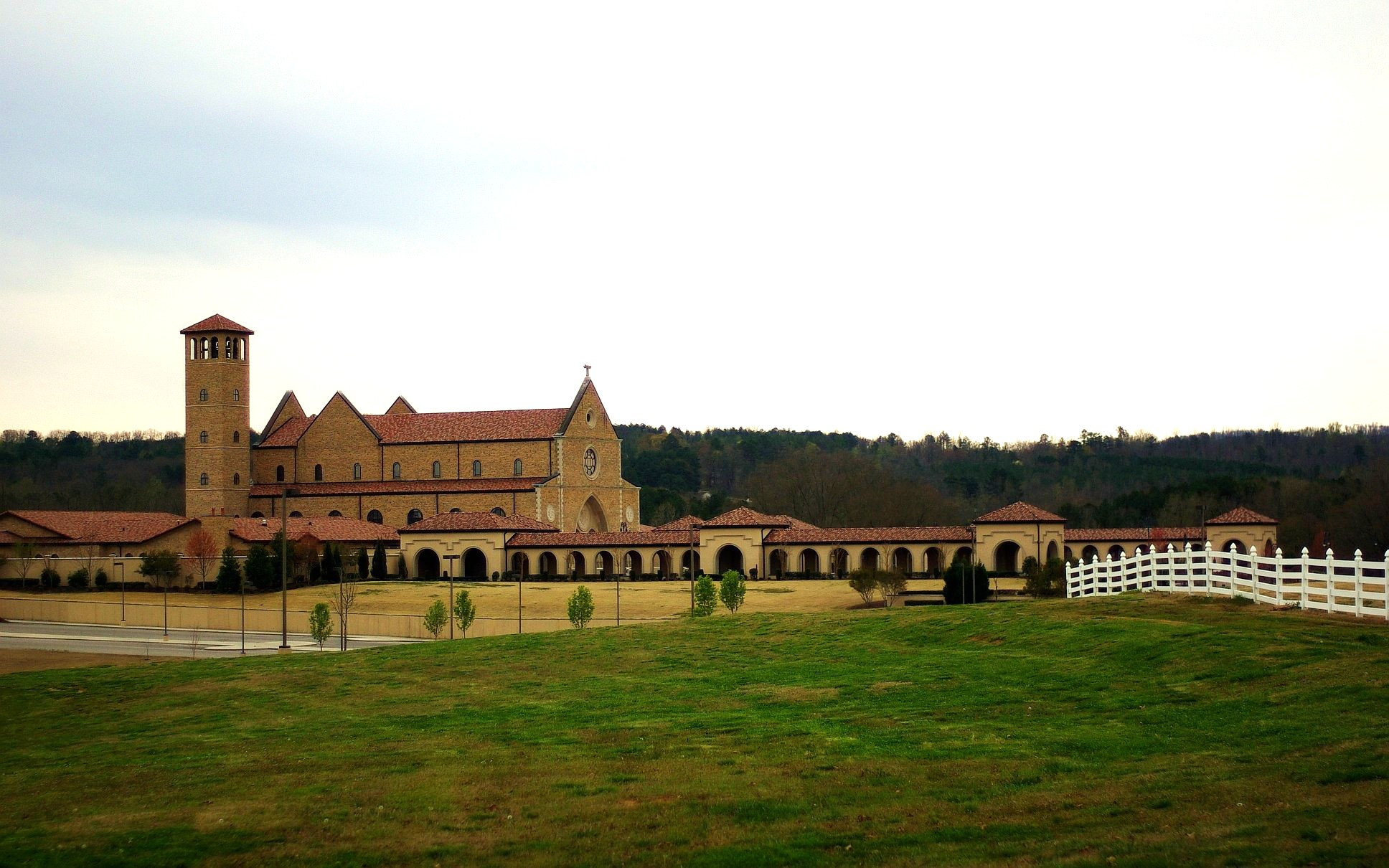

- Location within Alabama Location within the United States

Religion
- Affiliation: Catholic Church
- Year consecrated: 1999

Location
- Location: Hanceville, Alabama, United States
- Coordinates: 34.055682°N 86.688594°W

Website
- olamshrine.com

The Shrine of the Most Blessed Sacrament of Our Lady of the Angels Monastery, informally known as OLAM Shrine, is a prominent Catholic shrine located in Hanceville, Alabama, United States, in the Diocese of Birmingham. Adjacent is the cloistered Monastery of the Poor Clare Nuns of Perpetual Adoration, situated on a 400-acre (160 ha) site and a religious center affiliated with the Eternal Word Television Network.

The shrine is notable for its gilt interior, solemn atmosphere, and 7.5-foot (2.3 m) monstrance. The shrine is named in honor of the Blessed Sacrament, while the building surroundings are dedicated to the Divino Niño, a title of the Child Jesus found prominently displayed all over the area. Its foundress, Mother Mary Angelica of the Annunciation, resided at the cloistered monastery with her nuns until her death in 2016.

== History ==
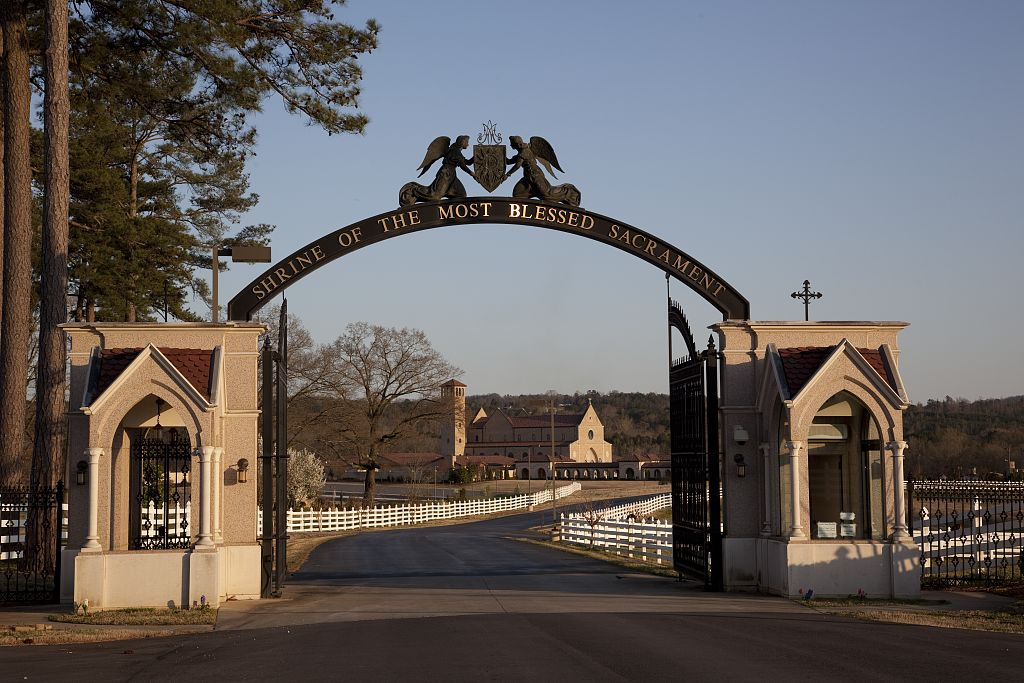
The entrance gates to the shrine.

In 1995, while travelling to Colombia to seek assistance for EWTN's Spanish-language programs, Mother Angelica attended Mass at the Sanctuary of the Divine Child Jesus in Bogotá and was inspired to build a shrine honoring the real presence of Christ in the Eucharist. Five anonymous benefactors contributed to the purchase of a 400-acre (160 ha) former soybean farm located in Hanceville, Alabama, and to construction costs and materials. The monastery was consecrated in December 1999.

== Campus ==
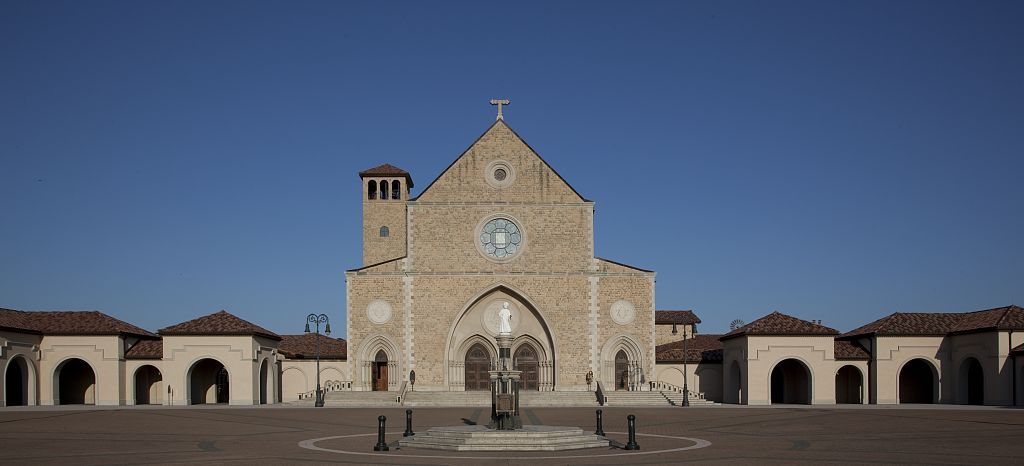
Main plaza at the Shrine of the Most Blessed Sacrament, Hanceville, Alabama. A statue of Mother Angelica's depiction of the Divine Child is prominently displayed in the plaza square.

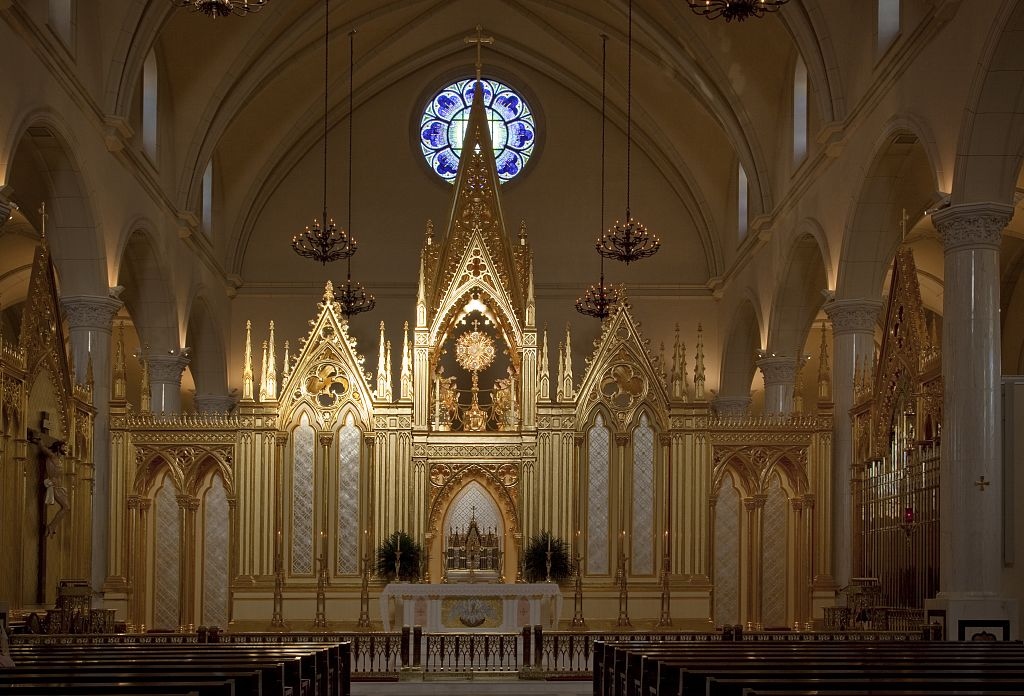
The sanctuary of the shrine.

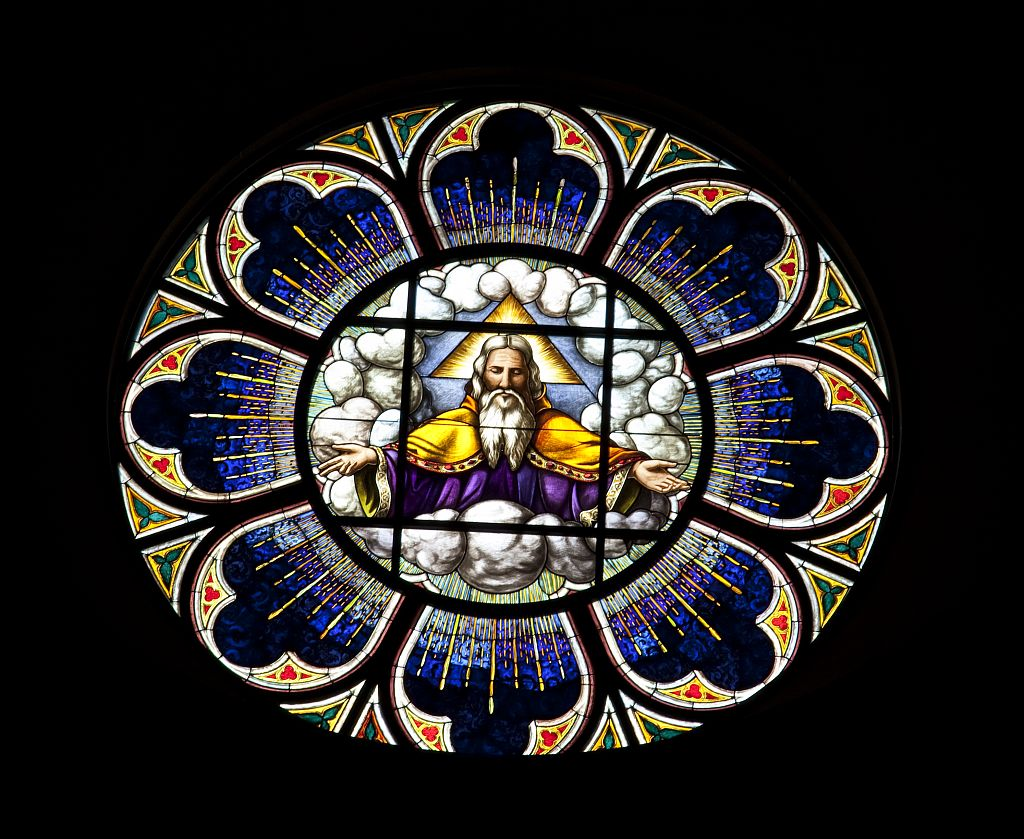
Rose window depiciting God the Father

The exterior is characteristic Romanesque, but incorporates pointed arches and other Gothic elements. Mother Angelica sought to model the Shrine on 13th century Italian architecture, with its piazza or plaza square, colonnade, esplanade, and various cosmatesque designs. She also wanted the building to reflect materials from all over the world. The ceramic tile came from South America. The bronze doors depicting the Seven Joys and Seven Sorrows of Mary were designed and crafted in Spain. The floors, columns, and pillars are made of marble. The rare red Jasper marble is from Turkey. The wood for the pews, doors, and confessionals is cedar imported from Paraguay. Spanish workers came to build the doors. The stained glass windows were imported from Munich, Germany. The stations of the Cross inside are hand-carved.

The shrine also contains, within its campus, a cloistered monastery, a near-life-sized nativity scene, Lourdes grotto, the Castle San Miguel that houses the El Niño gift shop and conference rooms, and the John Paul II Eucharistic Center. Stations of the Cross are also displayed on the right side of the plaza square, and at the end of the stations is a prominent crucifix with graphic details of the Passion of Jesus.

During construction, a storm struck the area, causing the church's cross to be damaged. Initially, Mother Angelica wanted to repair it. Later on, Mother Angelica associated the cross with the Tau cross. The damaged remains of the top part of the cross are on display in the St. Joseph Courtyard.
