= Cristiane Murray =

Vice Director of the Holy See Press Office between 2019 and 2026

Vice Director of the Holy See Press Office
- In office July 2019 – 1 March 2026
- Monarchs: Francis; Leo XIV
- Preceded by: Paloma García Ovejero
- Succeeded by: Nina Benedikta Krapić

Personal details
- Born: 1962 (age 63–64) Rio de Janeiro, Brazil
- Children: 2
- Education: Pontifical Catholic University of Rio de Janeiro
- Occupation: journalist

Cristiane Murray (born 1962) is a Brazilian radio journalist who served as the Vice Director of the Holy See Press Office between 2019 and 2026. She worked for Vatican Radio, within the Dicastery for Communication, providing commentary on papal events and international trips as well as managing and producing content in Portuguese for Vatican News' social media platforms. She was appointed by Pope Francis as Vice Director of the Holy See Press Office in 2019, becoming the second woman, after Paloma García Ovejero, and the first Latin American woman to serve in this capacity. The appointment has made her one of the most prominent women in Vatican leadership.

== Early life and education ==
Murray was born in Rio de Janeiro, Brazil in 1962.

She graduated with a degree in business administration and marketing from the Pontifical Catholic University of Rio de Janeiro.

== Career ==
Murray joined Vatican Radio, within the Dicastery for Communication, as a radio journalist in 1995. She worked for Vatican Radio for over twenty-five years, providing live commentary on papal events and international trips. Murray was part of the Brazilian team that broadcast daily programs and produced content for the Vatican News, a news portal provided by the Pontifical Council for Social Communications, in Portuguese for their Facebook, Twitter, Instagram, and YouTube accounts. From April 2018 to October 2019, she collaborated with Cardinal Lorenzo Baldisseri, the General Secretariat of the Synod of Bishops in the Catholic Church, in preparation for the Synod of Bishops for the Pan-Amazon region in October 2019.

In July 2019 Pope Francis appointed Murray as the Vice Director of the Holy See Press Office. She serves under Matteo Bruni, the Director of the Holy See Press Office, and assists in directing all content from Vatican Media. Murray is the second laywoman to hold a position in the management of the Holy See Press office, after Paloma García Ovejero, and the first Latin American woman to hold a managerial position. The appointment has made her one of the most prominent women to serve in Vatican leadership positions, alongside Barbara Jatta, the director of the Vatican Museums, and Francesca Di Giovanni, the Undersecretary for Multilateral Affairs of the Roman Curia's Section for Relations with States. She was succeeded by Nina Benedikta Krapić on 1 March 2026.

== Personal life ==
Murray is married, and has two children. She is fluent in Portuguese, Italian, Spanish, French, and English.
