= Diocese of Ekiti =

Roman Catholic diocese in Nigeria

Diocese of Ekiti Dioecesis Ekitiensis

Location
- Country: Nigeria
- Territory: Ekiti State
- Ecclesiastical province: Ibadan
- Metropolitan: Ibadan
- Coordinates: 7°37′16″N 5°13′17″E Ado-Ekiti

Statistics
- Area: 5,888 km^{2} (2,273 sq mi)
- Population: Total; Catholics: (as of 2022); 3,612,110; 511,658 (14.2%)
- Parishes: 61

Information
- Denomination: Roman Catholic
- Rite: Latin Rite
- Established: July 30, 1972
- Cathedral: Saint Patrick Cathedral in Ado-Ekiti
- Secular priests: 96

Current leadership
- Pope: Leo XIV
- Bishop: Felix Femi Ajakaye

Map
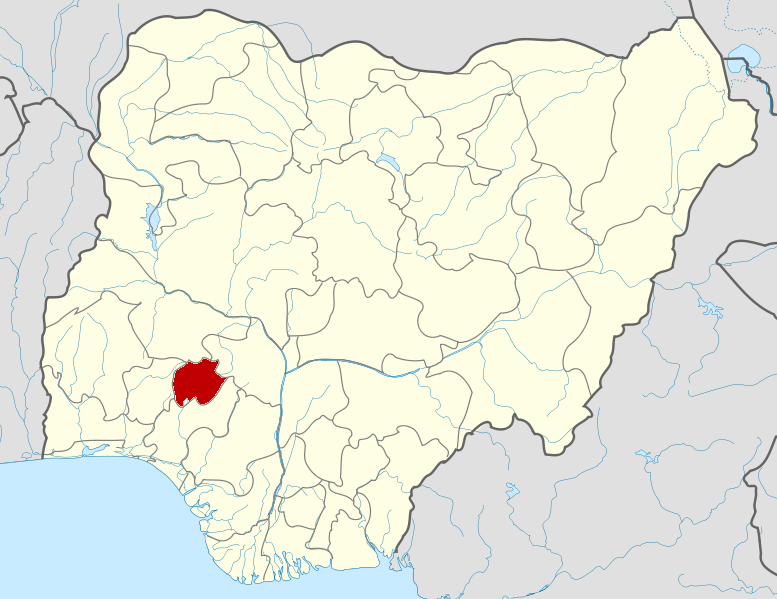
- Ekiti State is shown in red.

Website
- www.catholicdioceseofekiti.org

The Roman Catholic Diocese of Ekiti (Latin: Ekitien(sis)) is a diocese located in the city of Ado-Ekiti, Ekiti State in the ecclesiastical province of Ibadan in Nigeria.

== History ==
- July 30, 1972: Established as Diocese of Ado-Ekiti from the Diocese of Ondo
- December 11, 1972: Renamed as Diocese of Ekiti

== Special churches ==
The Cathedral is St Patrick's Cathedral in Ado-Ekiti

== Bishops ==
- Bishop of Ado-Ekiti (Roman rite)
  - Bishop Michael Patrick Olatunji Fagun (1972.07.30 - 1972.12.10 see below)
- Bishops of Ekiti (Roman rite)
  - Bishop Michael Patrick Olatunji Fagun (see above 1972.12.11 - 2010.04.17)
  - Bishop Felix Femi Ajakaye (2010.04.17 -)

=== Coadjutor Bishop ===
- Felix Femi Ajakaye (2008-2010)

== See also ==
- Roman Catholicism in Nigeria

== Sources ==
- Official Diocese of Ekiti website
- GCatholic.org Information
- Catholic Hierarchy
