= Thunigaba =

Latin Catholic titular see

Thunigaba was an ancient Roman(-Berber?) town in Roman Africa. It was a bishopric and is now a Latin Church titular see of the Catholic Church.

== History ==
The city was one of many in the Late Roman province of Africa proconsularis which were important enough to become a suffragan see of the primatial Metropolitan of Carthage, but later faded.

Its ruins are near modern Henchir-Aïn-Laabed, in present Tunisia.

== Titular see ==
In 1933, the diocese was nominally restored as a Latin titular bishopric of the lowest (episcopal) rank.

So far, it had the following episcopal incumbents :

- Giocondo Maria Grotti, O.S.M. (1965.07.08 – 1971.09.28), Territorial Bishop-Prelate of Acre and Purus (16 November 1962 - death 28 September 1971),
- Julius Babatunde Adelakun (1972.11.16 – 1973.04.13) as Auxiliary Bishop of Oyo (Nigeria) (1972.11.16 – 1973.04.13); later succeeded as Bishop of Oyo (1973.04.13 – retired 2009.11.04)
- Paweł Socha, C.M. (1973.11.20 – 2026.10.29), Auxiliary Bishop emeritus of Zielona Góra–Gorzów (Poland)

== External links and sources ==
- GCatholic, with incumbent bio links
