= Jeremiah Mee =

Irish police officer and mutineer

Jeremiah Mee (29 March 1889 – 8 May 1953), was a member of the Royal Irish Constabulary (RIC) and leader of the Listowel Mutiny in 1920.

== Early life ==
Mee was born in the townland of Knockauns East, near Glenamaddy, County Galway. He was the fourth child of John Mee and Ellen née Mee; he had four brothers and four sisters. He left school at the age of 12 and worked on his father's farm until he joined the Royal Irish Constabulary (RIC).

Mee joined the RIC on 16 August 1910, aged 19. He was first stationed in Kesh, County Sligo in 1911. Following that he served in Collooney, Geevagh, Ballintogher and Grange, all in County Sligo.

== Mutiny ==
Mee was initially stationed in Listowel in 1919. In June 1920 the transfer of fourteen constables was ordered from Listowel barracks as the military were to take control. The constables at Listowel, led by Mee, refused the transfers as they felt military intervention unnecessary in the area.

On 19 June, Divisional Police Commissioner for Munster, Lt.–Col. Gerald Bryce Ferguson Smyth, came to Listowel to give a speech to the constables, in which he called for more ruthlessness against The sein Fein 'The more you shoot the better I will like you, and no policeman will get in trouble for shooting a man.' he also hinted at the treatment for its prisoners and proclaimed:'Any man who is not prepared to co-operate is a hindrance rather than a help and he had better leave the force at once.'After an angry reaction from Mee, Smyth ordered that he be placed under arrest, which the remaining constables prevented. After a period of quiet in the barracks Mee, along with four other constables, left the force.

A version of Smyth's speech at Listowel was published in the Freeman's Journal on 10 July 1920. There has been debate over the accuracy of this reported speech. The Freeman's Journal later reported that it was polemically based to discredit British governance. Following this Smyth was shot dead on 17 July 1920 in the County Club, Co. Cork.

== Later life ==
Following the mutiny, Mee made contact with Countess Markievicz and Michael Collins, becoming involved with Sinn Féin, helping former RIC officers find employment. He was involved with the Belfast Boycott, boycotting Belfast banks and businesses, which was instigated by the Republican Dáil. Mee later worked for the Irish White Cross and in the oil industry for British Petroleum (BP) and Russian Oil Products Ltd. Following that he worked in the Department of Local Government and Public Health.

Mee died on 8 May 1953, and is buried in Glasnevin Cemetery.
