= Diocese of Osogbo =

Roman Catholic diocese in Nigeria

Diocese of Osogbo Dioecesis Osogboanus

Location
- Country: Nigeria
- Territory: Osun State
- Ecclesiastical province: Ibadan
- Metropolitan: Ibadan
- Coordinates: 7°46′00″N 4°34′00″E

Statistics
- Area: 8,062 km^{2} (3,113 sq mi)
- Population: Total; Catholics: (as of 2022); 2,442,575; 78,925 (3.2%)
- Parishes: 61

Information
- Denomination: Roman Catholic
- Rite: Latin Rite
- Established: 3 March 1995
- Cathedral: Cathedral of Saint Benedict in Osogbo
- Secular priests: 74

Current leadership
- Pope: Leo XIV
- Bishop: John Akin Oyejola

Map
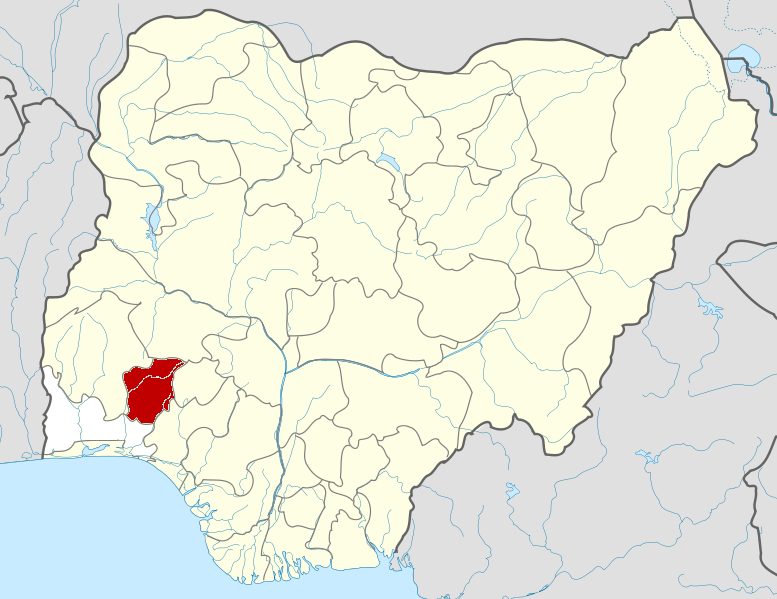
- Osogbo is located in Osun State which is shown here in red.

The Roman Catholic Diocese of Osogbo (Latin: Osogboan(us)) is a diocese located in the city of Osogbo, Osun State in the ecclesiastical province of Ibadan in Nigeria.

== Special churches ==
The Cathedral is Saint Benedict’s Cathedral in Osogbo.

== History ==
Christian activities in Nigeria began in the first place around 1472 through the Portuguese Catholic traders around the Niger Delta area – Calabar, Bonny, and Warri kingdoms. A church was built in Benin and the son of Oba of Benin was baptized in 1574. In spite of their efforts, their mission failed because the traders were more interested in commerce than evangelization. These early Roman Catholic missionaries and traders were reported to get as far as Ile-Ife(a part of Catholic Osogbo Diocese territory) during the 15th century first attempt at evangelization of Nigeria.

According to Fabunmi (1970), it wasn’t until 1843 about three hundred years after Christianity had become extinct in Ile-Ife that the faith resurfaced in Nigeria again. Modupe Oduyoye (1969), traced the evangelisation of Yoruba land to Father Francisco Borghero, S.M.A, who landed in Lagos on 17 February 1862 from Quidah in Dahomey. It was reported that he met Brazilian Catholics on ground about 1,200 baptized Catholics in Lagos. They were emigrants from Brazil and Cuba after the emancipation of slaves in those areas, they were under the pastoral care of priests from San Thome Island. While the presence of Catholicism in Nigeria predates Fr Borghero he nevertheless was the one who undertook the active evangelization of the hinterland.

Patrick’O Neil (1971), claimed that ‘In the year 1884 two priests of the Society of African Missions (SMA), Fathers Jean- Baptiste Chausse and Theodore Holley travelled from Oyo to Ibadan with a view to opening a mission in the town". In 1942 Rome instructed the white fathers to take over part of SMA territory in Lagos which was then the Oyo prefecture excluding Ibadan. Rev. Fr Capt. Owen MCcoy then an army chaplain in Accra Ghana was appointed the superior of the White Fathers to take over the new jurisdiction. He was joined on 8 December 1942 By Frs J. Byrne, J. Williams, T. Kane, and D. Smith who arrived from England.Fr Byrne was appointed to Osogbo under Father Mc McCarthy, S.M.A and Father Coffey to Murumba in Ife.

At this stage- early 1945 only four places had resident priests: Osogbo, Oyo, Ife, and Ilesha. The main outstations to which they tried to give a minimum of attention were: for Osogbo area - Otan-Ayegbaju, Inisha and Ede. For area Oyo- Fiditi, Awe, and Ogbomosho; for Ife area Modakeke, Ipetumodu and Ifetedo, for Ilesha area–Ipetu-Ijesa, Ibokun and Ifewara. There were other outstations. The far west of the jurisdiction namely; Iseyin, Iganna, Ijio etc. were much neglected because of non existent roads and poor means of transportation. In 1947 Father John Murphy and Thomas Kingseler joined the pastoral team in the mission field.

New Fathers arrived from time to time: Fr Bordeleau, from Navrongo, Frs Beauchamp, Gigras from Canada. Frs Roy and Belanger, Fr Laflame also from Canada. After five years of working hand in hand with SMA fathers, there was discussion between Bishop Durrieu–the superior of the white fathers, Fr Harrington, SMA General superior and Archbishop Matthew, the Apostolic Delegate to Nigeria then, Oyo prefecture was carved out and Fr.Owen McCoy was appointed Prefect Apostolic on 1 April 1949.

On 1 March 1963 the prefecture of Oyo was raised to a diocese with the apostolic prefect, Msgr Owen McCoy becoming the first bishop until his retirement in 1971. McCoy ordained the first generation of priests in Oyo diocese namely: Bishop J.B. Adelakun, late Msgr Joseph Taiwo, Msgri John Adeniyi, Lawrence Adesina, Rev.Frs Thomas Ilesanmi and Anthony Olawumi etc. Msgr Anthony Okogie was consecrated the auxiliary Bishop of Oyo in 1971 until he was moved to Lagos as Archbishop.Rev.Fr.Julius Adelakun was consecrated the auxiliary Bishop of the diocese on 11 February 1973.

On 3 March 1995 the Diocese of Osogbo was established from the Roman Catholic Diocese of Oyo. On 14 March 1995, the Diocese of Osogbo was carved out of Oyo diocese, with Bishop Gabriel Abegunrin appointed as the first Bishop. Bishop Adelakun formally moved his seat to Oyo and was canonically installed there on 30 April 1995.

== Bishops ==
- Bishops of Osogbo (Roman rite)
  - Bishop Gabriel ’Leke Abegunrin (3 March 1995 - 29 October 2013), appointed Archbishop of Ibadan
  - Bishop John Akin Oyejola (2 April 2016 – Present)

=== Other priests of this diocese who became bishops ===
- Francis Obafemi Adesina, appointed Bishop of Ijebu-Ode in 2019
- Emmanuel Adetoyese Badejo, appointed Coadjutor Bishop of Oyo in 2007

== Biographical Notes about Bishop Abegunrin ==
Bishop Abegunrin holds Doctorate degree in Canon Law from Pontifical Urban University Rome, 1988. Parish Priest St Ferdinand's Catholic Church, Ogbomosho, 1988- 1992. Cathedral Administrator, St. Benedict's Cathedral, Osogbo, 1992-1995. Catholic Representative, Christian Association of Nigeria, Osun State, 1992-1995. Chaplain, Political Awareness Committee, 1993-1995. Appointed by the Federal Government of Nigeria as Chairman of Peace and Reconciliation committee for Ife - Modakeke crises on 24 March 2000. Appointed Chairman, Christian Association of Nigeria, 2000-2004. Former Chairman Lay Apostolate Organisations of Catholic Bishops' Conference of Nigeria.

Some of his Writings: Parish Organisation in Conciliar Documents and in the Code of Canon Law With Special Reference to Oyo Diocese of Nigeria, 1988. Collaborative Ministry: A Challenge for Religious in the Third Millennium, 2001. The Pathway to an Authentic Peaceful Social Order in Nigeria, 2003. Canon Law and Leadership:Lessons and Implications for the Church in Nigeria, 2002. The Role of the Laity in Social Transformation, 2000 Upholding Christian Values in a Crises Ridden Society, 2002. His biography titled: A Shepherd in Service published by Book Merit Publishing and Editorial Consultants, Ibadan, 2005 was written by a priest in the diocese.

== See also ==
- Roman Catholicism in Nigeria
