= Šempeter pri Gorici =

- Town
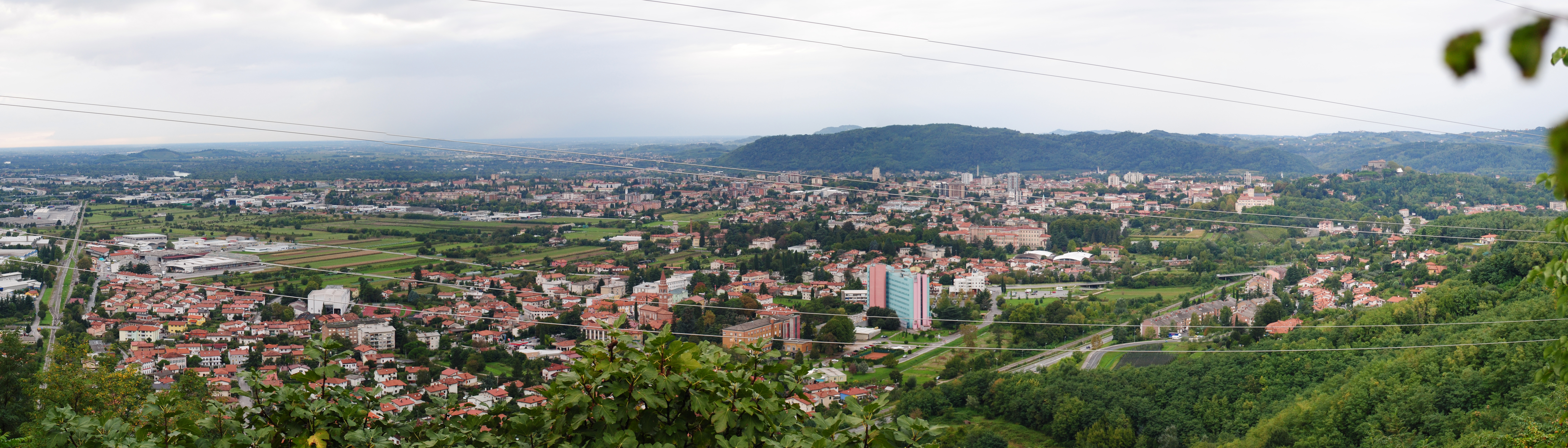
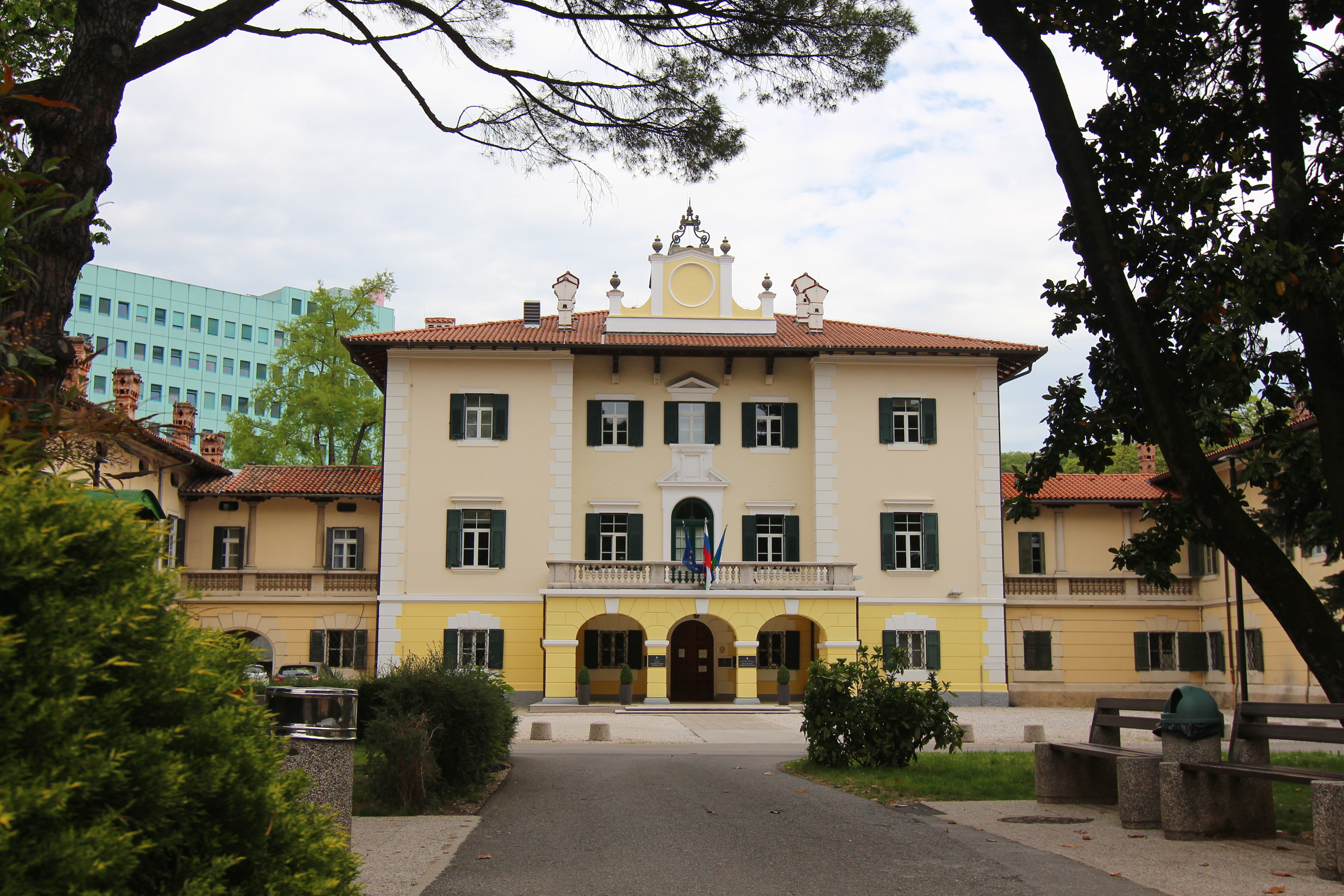
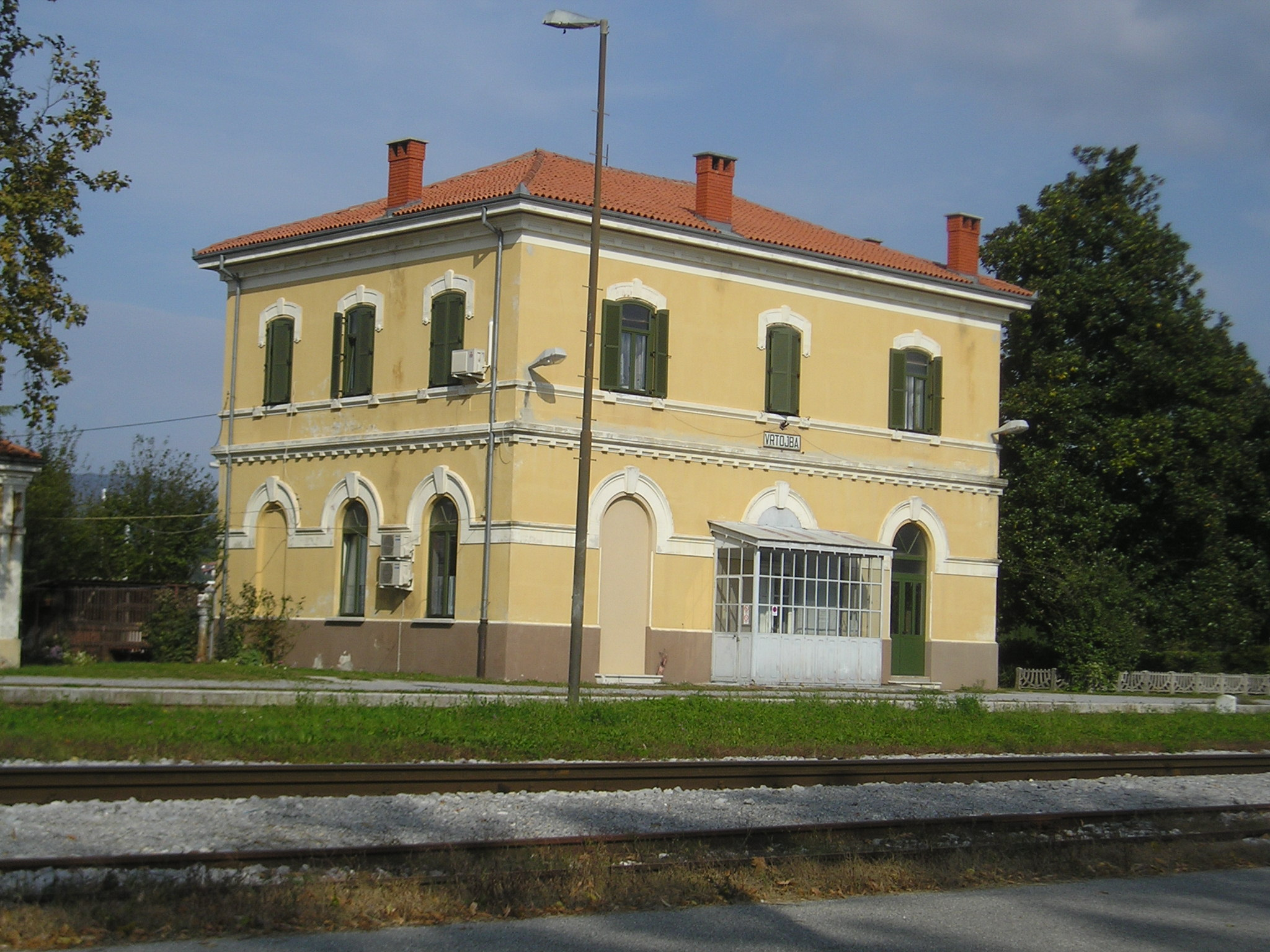
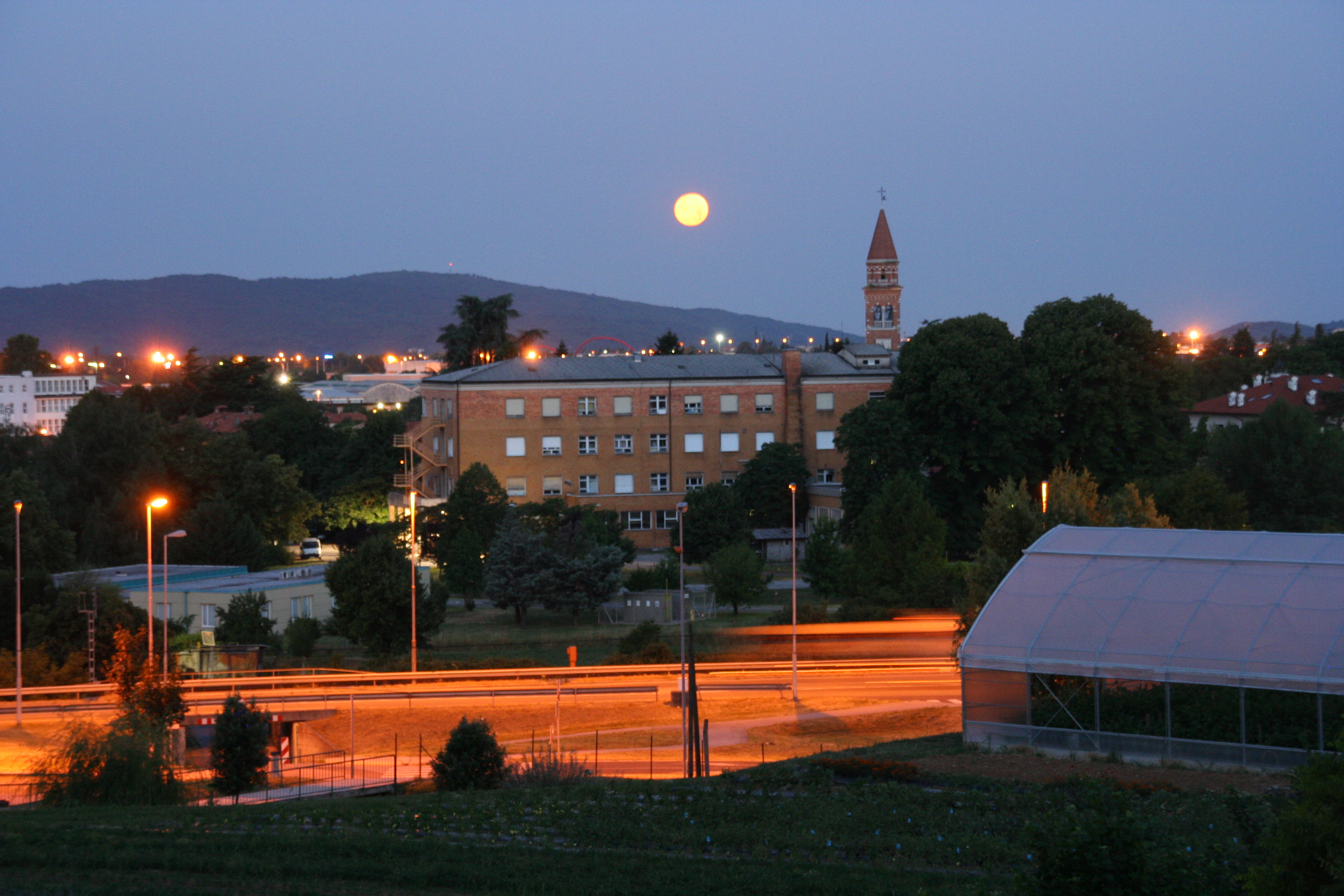
- From top, left to right: Šempeter and Italian Gorizia from above, Coronini Manor, Railway station, Town overview

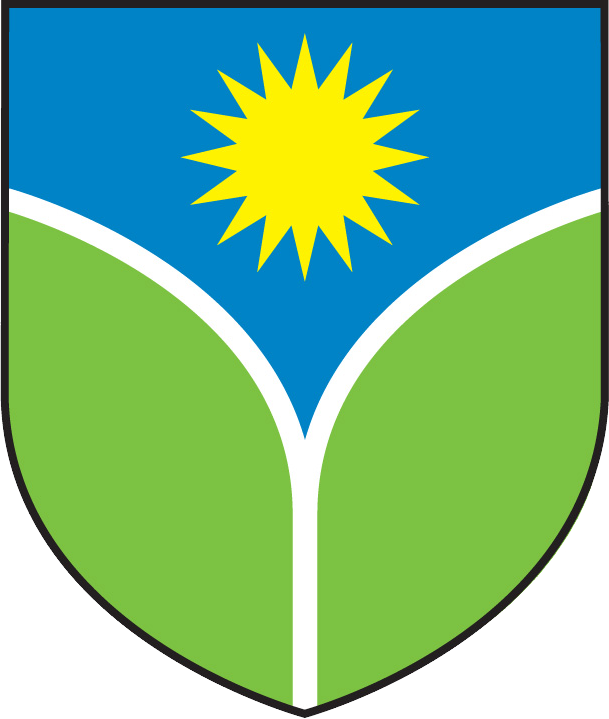
- Coat of arms

- Location in Slovenia
- Coordinates: 45°55′42.16″N 13°38′16.17″E
- Country: Slovenia
- Traditional region: Littoral
- Statistical region: Gorizia
- Municipality: Šempeter-Vrtojba

Government
  - Mayor: Milan Turk (SLS)
- Elevation: 72 m (236 ft)

Population (2020)
  - Total: 3,694
- Climate: Cfa

Šempeter pri Gorici (pronounced [ʃɛmˈpèːtəɾ pɾi ɡɔˈɾìːtsi], also generally known simply as Šempeter; Italian: San Pietro di Gorizia) is a town and the administrative seat of the Municipality of Šempeter-Vrtojba in the Slovene Littoral region of Slovenia. There is a border crossing into the Italian town of Gorizia.

Through most of its history, it was linked to the town of Gorizia (Slovene: Gorica), which is now in Italy, whence also its name, literally meaning 'St. Peter near Gorizia'. Since 1947, it has been gravitating towards the newly established town of Nova Gorica, with which it forms a continuous conurbation.

== History ==
In the Middle Ages, it was part of the Patriarchate of Aquileia and then of the County of Gorizia. In 1500, it came under Habsburg rule, and it remained part of the Habsburg Monarchy until 1918, excluding a short French interim between 1809 and 1813.

During the Austrian administration in the 19th and early 20th centuries, it formed an independent municipality. According to the last Austrian census of 1910, more than 97% of its inhabitants were ethnic Slovenes. During World War I, it was almost completely destroyed during the Battles of the Isonzo. In August 1916, it was seized by the Italian Army, but it was recaptured by the Austro-Hungarians in November 1917. After the war, it was again occupied and later annexed by Italy. In the 1920s, it was rebuilt according to the plans of the architect Max Fabiani.

In 1924 and 1947, it was an integral part of the Municipality of Gorizia, and it effectively became a suburb of Gorizia. During World War II, it became an important center of Yugoslav Partisan resistance. In May 1945, the Yugoslav Partisans took control of the town. From June 1945 to September 1947, it was under Anglo-American military administration, and it was annexed to Yugoslavia in 1947.

In the 1950s and 1960s, when the town of Nova Gorica was still largely under construction, several important institutions were headquartered in Šempeter, including the Nova Gorica Grammar School and the Gorica Football Club.

Since the 1970s, the regional Dr Franc Derganc General Hospital of Nova Gorica with a maternity ward has been located in Šempeter. Thus, most of the younger inhabitants of Nova Gorica and the wider Goriška area were born in Šempeter pri Gorici.

Historical population
Year	Pop.	±%
1948	1,268	—
1953	1,618	+27.6%
1961	2,169	+34.1%
1971	2,936	+35.4%
1981	3,398	+15.7%
1991	3,924	+15.5%
2002	3,865	−1.5%
2011	3,760	−2.7%
2021	3,720	−1.1%
Population size may be affected by changes in administrative divisions.

== Notable people ==
Notable people that were born or lived in Šempeter pri Gorici include:

- Valter Birsa, footballer
- Saša Ciani, basketball player
- Franz Coronini, Austrian noble and politician
- Goran Cvijanović, footballer
- Kristjan Čujec, futsal player
- Saša Dončić, basketball player
- Robert Golob, businessman, politician, and the current prime minister of Slovenia
- Nataša Govekar, Director of the Theological-Pastoral Department at the Dicastery for Communications
- Andrej Komac, footballer
- Jani Kovačič, volleyball player
- Tim Matavž, footballer
- Borut Mavrič, footballer
- Borut Pahor, politician and the fourth president of Slovenia
- Etien Velikonja, footballer
- Miha Zajc, footballer
- Saša Živec, footballer
- Mitja Velikonja, academic
