= Felix Ajakaye =

Nigerian Catholic bishop of Ekiti Diocese

Felix Femi Ajakaye (born 25 May 1962 in Ibadan) is a Nigerian prelate and the current bishop of the Catholic Diocese of Ekiti. He is the second bishop of the diocese, serving since 2010.

== Early life and education ==
Ajakaye was born in Ibadan. He began his journey to priesthood at the Minor Seminary Oke-Are from 1974 to 1980 before proceeding to Saint Peter and Paul Major Seminary in Bodija, Ibadan where he trained in philosophy and theology, graduating with two degrees. He earned a degree in pastoral communication from the Pontifical Gregorian University in Rome and a master's degree in journalism from Cardiff University in Wales.

== Priesthood ==
Ajakaye was ordained as a priest on 4 July 1987 and served in various roles including as pastoral assistant at St. Patrick's Cathedral and as priest in charge of Christ the King Parish and St. Michael's Catholic Church in Opopogboro.

On 16 April 2008, Pope Benedict XVI appointed Ajakaye as Coadjutor Bishop of Ekiti and consecrated as bishop of the diocese by bishop Michael Fagun on 12 July 2008. On 17 April 2010, Ajakaye assumed full leadership of the diocese succeeding bishop Fagun.

Ajakaye is known for his intervention during the Barkin Ladi, Plateau State unrest.
