= Nina Benedikta Krapić =

Vice Director of the Holy See Press Office since 2026

Sister Nina Benedikta Krapić DC

Vice Director of the Holy See Press Office
- Incumbent
- Assumed office 1 March 2026
- Monarch: Leo XIV
- Preceded by: Cristiane Murray

Personal details
- Born: 7 June 1989 (age 37) Rijeka, SR Croatia, Yugoslavia
- Education: University of Rijeka; University of Zagreb

Nina Benedikta Krapić DC (born 7 June 1989) is a Croatian Catholic religious sister who serves as Vice Director of the Holy See Press Office since 2026.

== Early life and education ==
Krapić was born on 7 June 1989 in Rijeka, Socialist Republic of Croatia, then Yugoslavia. She obtained a degree in law from the University of Rijeka in 2015 and specialised in public relations at the University of Zagreb in 2023. She is currently pursuing a PhD in social sciences at the Pontifical Gregorian University.

== Career ==
On 13 August 2023, she took her vows with the Daughters of Charity of Saint Vincent de Paul. Krapić has worked as a journalist and radio presenter for Radio Trsat and legal assistant for women who are victims of gender-based violence at "Saint Anne" Caritas shelter and for marginalised people at the Social Welfare Centre in Rijeka, as well as communications officer for the Archdiocese of Rijeka. That year, she joined the Vatican’s Dicastery for Communication.

Pope Leo XIV appointed Krapić as the new Vice Director of the Holy See Press Office on 13 February 2026, and assumed the office on 1 March 2026 succeeding Cristiane Murray.
