= Thomas P. Hughes (bishop) =

Thomas P. Hughes S.M.A.
- Bishop of Ondo
- Church: Catholic Church
- Diocese: Diocese of Ondo
- In office: 12 January 1943 – 1 April 1957
- Predecessor: Diocese erected
- Successor: William R. Field
- Other post: Titular Bishop of Latopolis (1957)
- Previous posts: Titular Bishop of Nepte (1943-1950); Prefect of Kaduna (1934-1943)

Orders
- Ordination: 16 June 1927 by Edward Mulhern
- Consecration: 9 May 1943 by Leo Hale Taylor

Personal details
- Born: 1 February 1891 Hollymount, County Mayo, United Kingdom of Great Britain and Ireland
- Died: 17 April 1957 (aged 66) Cork, County Cork, Republic of Ireland

Thomas P. Hughes, S.M.A. (1 February 1891 – 17 April 1957) was an Irish-born Catholic prelate and member of the Society of African Missions who served as the Bishop of Ondo in Nigeria.

== Biography ==
Born in Hollymount, County Mayo, Ireland on 1 February 1891, son of shopkeeper Peter Hughes and Mary Cawny, Thomas studied at Ballinrobe C.B.S., after school he became a member of the Royal Irish Constabulary. During the Irish War of Independence, Constable Hughes was involved in Listowel mutiny, when he refused orders to kill suspects who refused to surrender, which ended his position in the RIC and after this he decided to become a priest. Thomas was described in a later witness statement as 'a gentle and brilliant six foot athlete'.

He studied Sacred Heart College, Ballinafad, Co Mayo, then studying philosophy at Kilcolgan, Co Galway and joined the Society of African Missions, studying for three years at St. Joseph's theological seminary, Blackrock Road, Cork, before completed his theological formation at Dromantine House, Co Down, when the seminary moved in September 1926. Thomas was ordained a priest in June 1927, at St. Colman's Cathedral, Newry by Bishop Edward Mulhern.

He joined the staff of St Gregory's College, Lagos, Nigeria, and went on to serve as a in the Roman Catholic Archdiocese of Kaduna in Northern Nigeria. The Prefecture of Northern Nigeria into two in 1934, one part being the Prefecture of Kaduna under Monsignor Thomas Hughes (and the other Prefecture of Jos under Monsignor William Lumley).

In 1943 Fr Hughes became Vicar Apostolic of Ondo-Ilorin, and when Ondo became a Bishopric in 1950 he became the first Bishop of Ondo.

Bishop Hughes brother, Patrick (Paddy) was also a missionary for the Society of African Missions, and their Sister became a nun, their niece Sr. Thomasina Hughes OLA also became a nun.

Suffering from heart problems, he resigned as Bishop, Hughes died in Cork in 1957, and is buried in St. Joseph's Wilton Cemetery, Co. Cork.
