= Paloma García Ovejero =

Vice Director of the Holy See Press Office (born 1975)

Vice Director of the Holy See Press Office
- Assumed role 1 August 2016 – 31 December 2018
- Monarch: Francis
- Preceded by: Greg Burke
- Succeeded by: Cristiane Murray

Personal details
- Born: 12 August 1975 (age 51) Madrid, Spain
- Education: Complutense University of Madrid; National University of Distance Education; New York University
- Occupation: journalist

Paloma García Ovejero (born 12 August 1975) is a Spanish journalist. She began her career as a news editor and broadcast journalist for Cadena COPE and Radio Nacional de España. In 2016 she became the first woman to serve as Vice Director of the Holy See Press Office. Since her resignation from her Vatican position in December 2018, she works as a television reporter for Trece in the United Kingdom.

== Early life and education ==
García Ovejero was born on 12 August 1975 in Madrid. In 1998 she received a bachelor's degree in journalism from Complutense University of Madrid. In 2001 she obtained a master's degree in Basque studies from the National University of Distance Education. In 2006 she earned a specialization in management strategies and communications through New York University.

== Career ==
García Ovejero began her career in journalism in 1998 as a news editor for the programs La Linterna and La Mañana for Cadena COPE, a Spanish radio station owned by the Episcopal Conference of Spain. Later, she was appointed as the Head of Society and Culture. In 2012 she was sent to work as a correspondent in Italy and the Vatican City, replacing Paloma Gómez Borrero. She also worked as a correspondent for Radio Nacional de España.

In 2016 Pope Francis appointed García Ovejero as the Vice Director of the Holy See Press Office, following the appointment of former Vice Director Greg Burke to the office of Director. She became the first woman to serve in this capacity. Upon her appointment, she told the Catholic News Agency, "I’m the first woman, okay. Isn’t the Virgin Mary the first woman in the Church? Aren't the women those who ran to announce the resurrection? So it seems to be very natural. We like to announce great news. Let’s do it!" She officially assumed office on 1 August 2016.

On 31 December 2018, both García Ovejero and Burke announced their resignations, which were accepted by Pope Francis.

In May 2019 she became a news correspondent for Spanish news outlets Grupo COPE and Cope.es, and a news reporter for the Spanish television station Trece in the United Kingdom.

== Personal life ==
García Ovejero is fluent in Spanish, Italian, English, and Chinese.
