= Montse Alvarado =

Mexican-American media executive and journalist (born 1986)

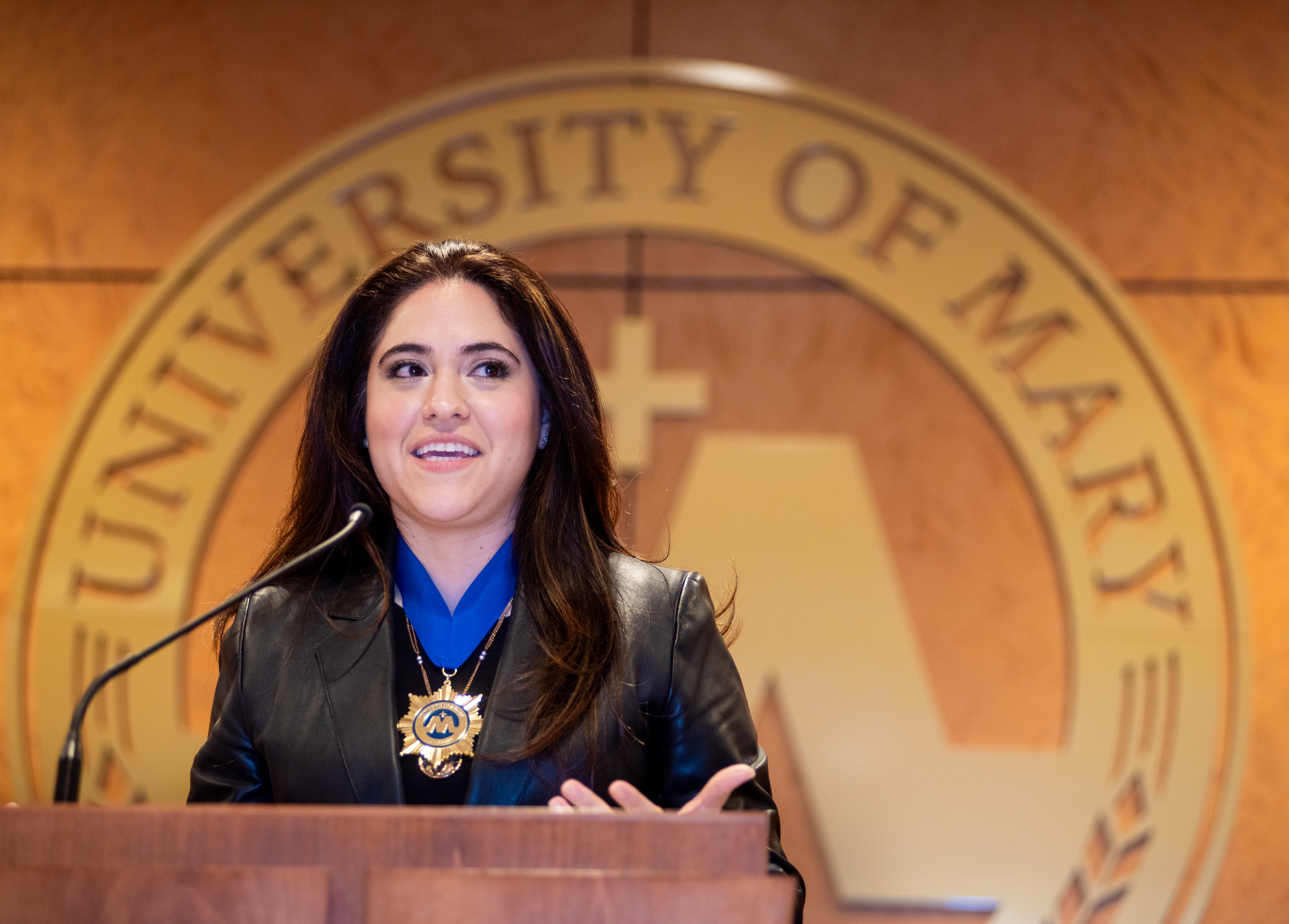
- Alvarado at the University of Mary in 2024
- Born: Maria Montserrat Alvarado; Mexico City, Mexico
- Education: Florida International University; George Washington University
- Occupations: Media executive; journalist; television host
- Known for: EWTN News; religious liberty advocacy; appointment to the Roman Curia
- Title: President and chief operating officer of EWTN News; Prefect-designate of the Dicastery for Communication

Maria Montserrat "Montse" Alvarado (born 13 November 1986) is a Mexican-American media executive, journalist and television host. She has served as president and chief operating officer of EWTN News since 2023. On June 2, 2026, Pope Leo XIV appointed her prefect of the Dicastery for Communication of the Holy See, effective November 1, 2026. She is the first woman to be the head of this dicastery, and the first non-religious woman appointed prefect of any dicastery of the Holy See.

== Early life and education ==
Alvarado was born in 1986 in Mexico City, Mexico. She earned a bachelor's degree from Florida International University and a master's degree from George Washington University.

== Career ==
Alvarado became a citizen of the United States in 2008. In 2009, she joined the Becket Fund for Religious Liberty, a nonprofit legal organization focused on religious liberty cases in the United States. She was named vice president and executive director of Becket in 2017. During her time at Becket, she worked in development, communications, strategy and operations.

In March 2021, Alvarado became the founding host of EWTN News In Depth, a weekly news program covering current events in the Catholic Church, politics, and culture. In 2023, she became president and chief operating officer of EWTN News, Inc. In that position, she oversaw EWTN's news media platforms, including television, radio, print, digital, and social media operations.

== Roman Curia ==
On June 2, 2026, Pope Leo XIV appointed Alvarado prefect of the Dicastery for Communication, effective November 1, 2026. The dicastery oversees the Holy See's communications operations, including Vatican News, Vatican Radio, L'Osservatore Romano, Vatican Media, the Holy See Press Office, the Vatican publishing house, the Vatican printing press and the Vatican Film Library. She is the first woman to be the head of this dicastery, and the first non-religious woman appointed prefect of any dicastery of the Holy See.

== Other activities and honors ==
Alvarado has served on the Montgomery County Commission for Women in Maryland and on the board of the Patients' Rights Action Fund. She was also a lay consultant to the United States Conference of Catholic Bishops Committee for Religious Liberty and a member or adviser to several Catholic organizations, including the Council of Major Superiors of Women Religious, the GIVEN Institute, and the Catholic Information Center.

In 2024, the University of Mary named Alvarado the first recipient of its Lumen Gentium Medal.

== Personal life ==
Alvarado is a practising Roman Catholic. She speaks English, Spanish, and French.
