= Richard Finn (bishop) =

Irish priest, Catholic bishop in Nigeria

Richard Finn SMA
- Bishop of Ibadan
- Church: Catholic Church
- Diocese: Diocese of Ibadan
- In office: 13 March 1953 – 3 July 1974
- Predecessor: Prefecture erected
- Successor: Felix Alaba Adeosin Job

Orders
- Ordination: 14 December 1941 by Edward Mulhern
- Consecration: 8 February 1959 by Leo Hale Taylor

Personal details
- Born: 3 March 1912 Tawnylough, Clanmorris, County Mayo, United Kingdom of Great Britain and Ireland
- Died: 4 January 1989 (aged 76) Galway, County Galway, Republic of Ireland
- Education: University College Galway; University College Cork

Richard Finn SMA (1912-1989), was an Irish-born priest and a member of the Society of African Missions who served as Bishop for the Roman Catholic Archdiocese of Ibadan in Nigeria.

== Life ==
=== Early life and education ===
Finn was born in 1912, Tawnylough, in Clanmorris Barony, County Mayo, Ireland.

He joined the Society of African Missions (SMA Fathers), first at St. Joseph's College in Wilton, Cork, attending lectures in University College Cork, before entering the Society's novitiate and house of philosophy, at Kilcolgan, County Galway in 1936. He graduated with a B.A. degree in Education and Philosophy in 1938 at University College Galway. From 1936, he studied theology at the Society's seminary at Dromantine House, County Down.

=== Later studies and early assignments ===
Post-ordination in 1941, at St. Colman's Newry, he continued his studies in Wilton, Cork, completing a H.Dip in Education from University College Cork. In 1943, he was sent to Nigeria's Archdiocese of Lagos, serving until 1952, when he returned to Ireland to be rector/principal of the SMA College in Ballinafad from 1952 to 1953.

=== Ibadan ===
Finn was made Prefect Apostolic of Ibadan in 1953, a church unit which was created from the Archdiocese of Lagos. In 1958 Ibadan was elevated to a diocese, with Monsignor Finn made the first Bishop of Ibadan.

During the Nigerian Civil War, like many other Irish religious figures serving in Nigeria at the time, Finn expressed a pro-federalist view.

=== Later ===
Finn retired in 1974, returned to Ireland, and served in Knock, in his native County Mayo. He died on 4 January 1989 in hospital in Galway, following a short illness, and is buried in the SMA Cemetery in Wilton, Cork.
