= Julius Babatunde Adelakun =

Nigerian Roman Catholic bishop (1934–2025)

His Lordship Julius Babatunde Adelakun
- Bishop Emeritus of Oyo
- Appointed: 11 February 1973
- Installed: 13 April 1973
- Term ended: 4 November 2009
- Predecessor: Owen McCoy
- Successor: Emmanuel Adetoyese Badejo
- Previous post: Titular Bishop of Thunigaba (1972–1973)

Orders
- Ordination: 27 June 1965
- Consecration: 11 February 1973 by Owen McCoy, Michael Fagun and Anthony Olubunmi Okogie

Personal details
- Born: Julius Babatunde Adelakun; 4 November 1934 Oniganbari, Colony and Protectorate of Nigeria
- Died: 24 October 2025 (aged 90)
- Denomination: Catholic

Julius Babatunde Adelakun (4 November 1934 – 24 October 2025) was a Nigerian Roman Catholic prelate, who served as Bishop of the Roman Catholic Diocese of Oyo. He retired from active service in 2009 and was succeeded by Emmanuel Adetoyese Badejo, the present Bishop of Oyo. Adelakun died on 24 October 2025, at the age of 90.

Catholic Church titles
Preceded by Owen McCoy	Bishop of Oyo; 1973–2009	Succeeded by Emmanuel Adetoyese Badejo
Preceded by Giocondo Maria Grotti	Titular Bishop of Thunigaba; 1972–1973	Succeeded by Paweł Socha
