= Eugenia Ravasio =

Italian mystic and Roman Catholic nun

Mother Eugenia Ravasio OLA
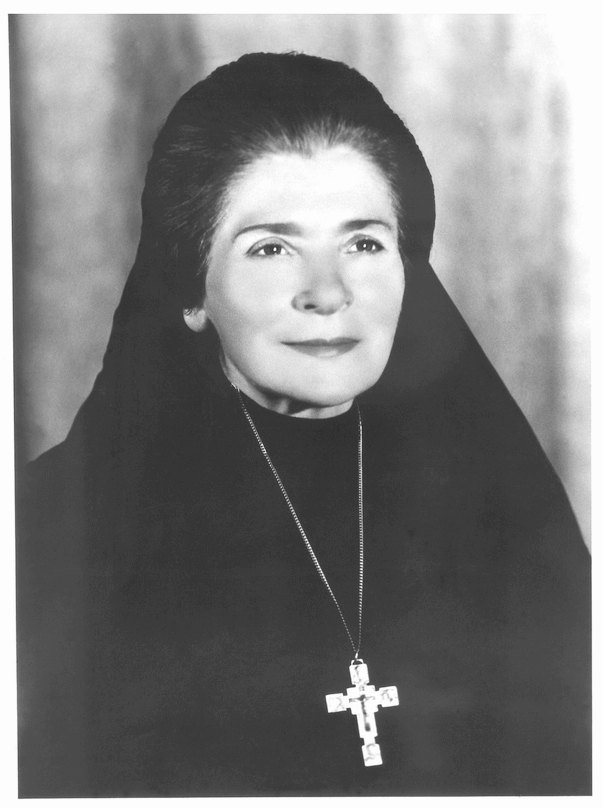
- Mother Eugenia Ravasio as Superior General of the Congregation of the Missionary Sisters of Our Lady of the Apostles
- Born: Eugenia Elisabetta Ravasio; 4 September 1907; Capriate San Gervasio, Bergamo, Italy
- Died: 10 August 1990 (aged 82); Anzio, Lazio, Italy
- Education: Primary only
- Occupation: Catholic nun
- Known for: Founded large leper colony in Ivory Coast, unique Mystic with revelations from God the Father
- Title: Mother General

Eugenia Ravasio, OLA (4 September 1907 – 10 August 1990), born Eugenia Elisabetta Ravasio, was an Italian Catholic nun in the Congregation of the Missionary Sisters of Our Lady of the Apostles and a mystic, best known for treating leprosy and for having reported visions and revelations from God the Father.

== Early life ==
Eugenia Elisabetta Ravasio was born in San Gervasio d’Adda (named now Capriate San Gervasio), a small town in the province of Bergamo, Italy, on 4 September 1907, in a family of peasant background.

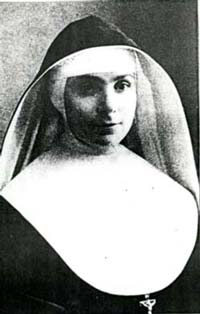
Mother Eugenia Ravasio as a nun of the Congregation of the Missionary Sisters of Our Lady of the Apostles (1932).

She received only an elementary education. After a few years working in a factory, she entered the Congregation of the Missionary Sisters of Our Lady of the Apostles at the age of 20 years. It was here that her great charismatic personality developed, leading to her election as Mother General of the Congregation at age 28.

== Social and apostolic work ==
Ravasio performed significant amounts of work in the social field. In twelve years of missionary activity she opened over 70 centres – each with infirmary, school and church – in the remotest spots of Africa, Asia and Europe.

In or around 1936, she was invited by Tanios Toni Kawas (a prominent cotton field landlord), son of Antoun Abdel Sayed Kawas (mayor of Girga, Egypt), to open the Lady of the Apostles school in Girga. The school is still in operation today. Tanios Toni Kawas, having six young girls and no schools for them, invited many religious congregations, but only Ravasio responded to his request.

As part of her work with lepers on the Ivory Coast she was instrumental in promoting and popularizing the use of chemotherapy for the cure of leprosy, by orally administering chaulmoogra oil which was extracted from the seed of a tropical plant. This medicine was later studied and developed further at the Pasteur Institute in Paris.

She encouraged the apostolate of Raoul Follereau, who, following in her footsteps and building on the foundations laid by her, is regarded as the apostle of the lepers.

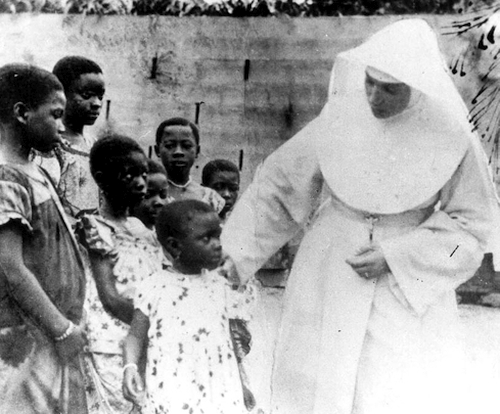
Mother Eugenia Ravasio as a Catholic missionary nun in Africa (1939).

During the period 1939–1941 she conceived, planned and brought to fruition the project for a "Lepers' City" at Adzopé (Ivory Coast). This was a vast centre, covering an area of 200,000 m^{2}, for the care of leprosy sufferers. It remains even today one of Africa's and the world's leading centres of its kind.

In recognition of this achievement, France conferred the Couronne Civique, the highest national honour for social work, on the Congregation of the Missionary Sisters of Our Lady of the Apostles, of which Ravasio was Superior General from 1935 to 1947.

== God the Father revelations ==
Ravasio reported a series of messages from God the Father, which were published as "The Father speaks to His children". The Bishop of Grenoble (who was mentioned in the messages) recognized these messages as authentic after ten years of examination. However, the Vatican has neither approved nor disapproved of these messages, and Catholics are not required to believe them. To date these are the only reported private revelations from God the Father that have been approved by a bishop.

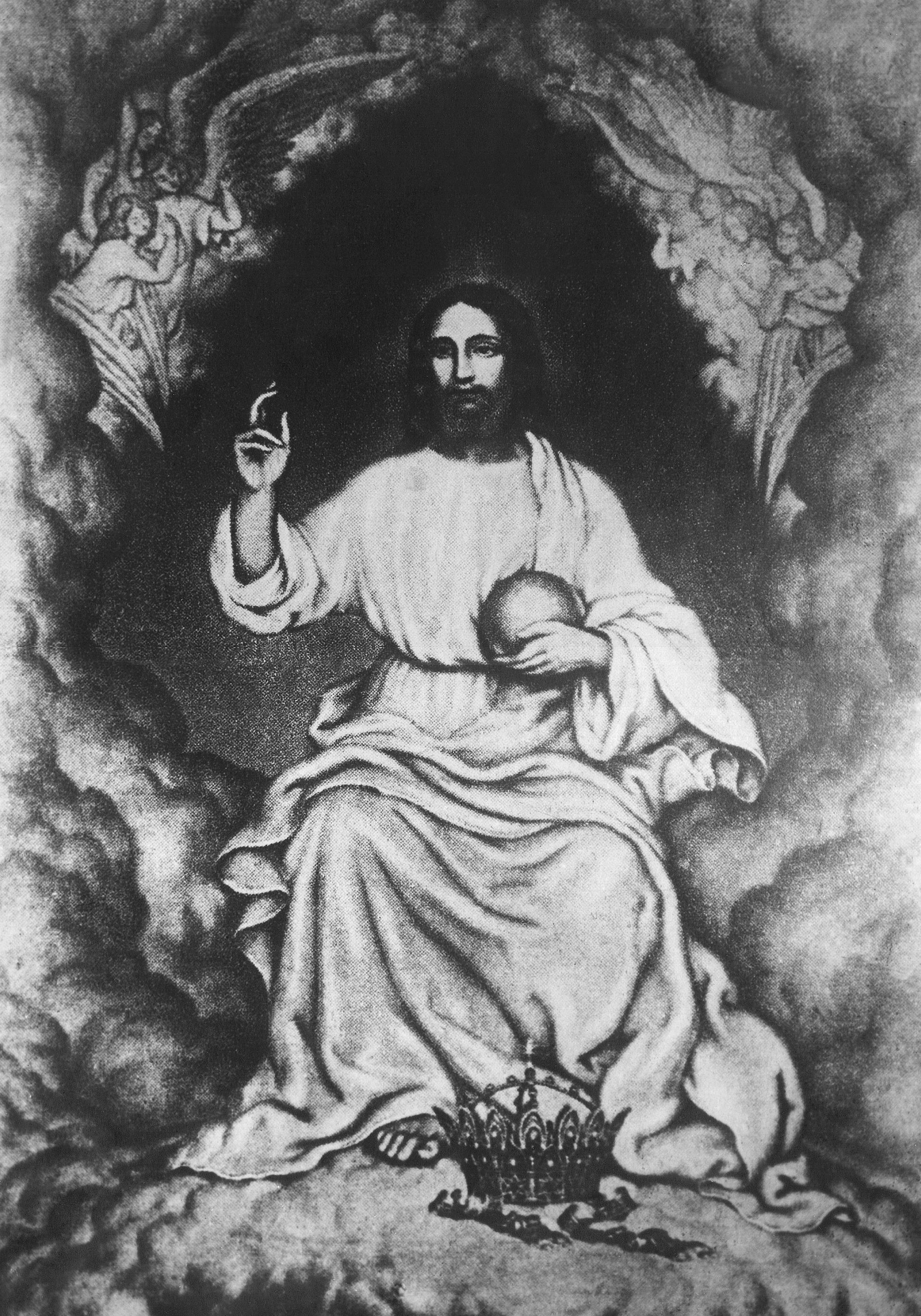
The picture of God the Father – the Eternal Father – based on the vision received by Mother Eugenia Ravasio (reproduction from 1936, unknown author).

In her book, Ravasio wrote that she personally saw God the Father and that God the Father sat next to her. On 1 July 1932, in Book 1, part 1, she quoted God the Father and wrote:

... "Look, I put aside my crown and all my glory to take the attitude of the common person"... After having taken the attitude of a common person, placing his crown and glory at his feet, he took the globe of the world to his heart. Supporting it with his left hand, then he sat down next to me...

Ravasio also wrote messages from God the Father to Bishop Alexandre Caillot, who later approved of the book. In Book 1, part 3 she wrote:

"I also want to say a word to you, My son Alexander, so that My desires may be realized in the world. You must join with the father confessor of this “little plant” (Mother Eugenia) of My Son Jesus, in promoting this work"

Ravasio also wrote of acts by the Devil. On 12 August 1932 she wrote that the Devil took the book and slashed its covers with a pair of scissors. On that day she also wrote of a new path to salvation and quoted God the Father as follows:

"ALL THOSE WHO CALL ME BY THE NAME OF FATHER, EVEN IF ONLY ONCE, WILL NOT PERISH, BUT WILL BE SURE OF THEIR ETERNAL LIFE AMONG THE CHOSEN ONES."

=== Church approval and controversies ===
Ravasio's messages were approved by Bishop Alexander Caillot of Grenoble, who was mentioned in the messages. Caillot ordered an investigation, and after ten years issued a letter stating that the messages had a divine nature.

In 1988 the messages received the imprimatur of Cardinal Petrus Canisius Van Lierde, Vicar General for the Vatican City State, whose general duties were the administration of daily functions of Vatican City. The imprimatur signified that in the cardinal's opinion the messages contain nothing against faith and morals, without certifying that the messages were received from God the Father.

== Works ==
- Mother Eugenia Ravasio; The Father speaks to His children. Rome, 1989.

== See also ==
- Mystical Rose
