= Listowel mutiny =

Mutiny during the Irish War of Independence

The Listowel mutiny occurred during the Irish War of Independence when Royal Irish Constabulary officers under the command of County Inspector O'Shea refused to be relocated out of their rural police station in Listowel, County Kerry and moved to other areas.

The uprising started on 17 June 1920, and has been cited as finishing when the local Divisional Police Commissioner for Munster, Lt.-Col. Gerald Bryce Ferguson Smyth was killed by Irish Republican Army volunteers a month later on 17 July. By this time many police officers in the area had moved into service with the IRA or decided not to engage the IRA in combat, for a variety of reasons.

On 19 June, Smyth arrived to inform the police of a new policy regarding rules of engagement with the IRA and their supporters. In the course of his address, he mentioned that in pursuit of their duty they would be given the power to shoot IRA suspects on sight. Order No. 5, which was issued on 17 June, stated that the police could shoot if a suspect failed to surrender 'when ordered to do so'. One of the apparent reasons for the constables' mutiny was because they were horrified by the thought of killing fellow Irishmen "on sight". One of those who refused was Constable Thomas Hughes from Mayo who went on to become a catholic priest and bishop in Nigeria.

Replacements were immediately sent from County Limerick under the command of Head Constable Tobias O'Sullivan, who was commissioned to take command of the District.

The mutiny was hailed as a success for Irish republicanism. Smyth was later assassinated when six IRA men shot him dead in the smoking room of the Cork and County Club.

Smyth was buried in his native Banbridge, County Down on 21 July 1920. Railway workers outside Ulster had earlier refused to transport his body home and Ulster loyalist "anger boiled over", leading to attacks on Catholic homes in Banbridge and nearby Dromore.

On 20 January 1921 Tobias O'Sullivan was shot to death in the street as he walked with his seven-year-old son.

== Sources ==
- Cottrell, Peter The Anglo-Irish War: The Troubles of 1913-1922 Osprey Publishing, 2006
- Contemporary account by constable Michael Kelly. The American Commission on Conditions in Ireland - Interim Report, 1920.
- Sequence of events according to historian J. Anthony Gaughan Listowel Police Mutiny (1974) at PoliceHistory.com
