= Andrea Tornielli =

Italian journalist and religious writer (born c. 1964)

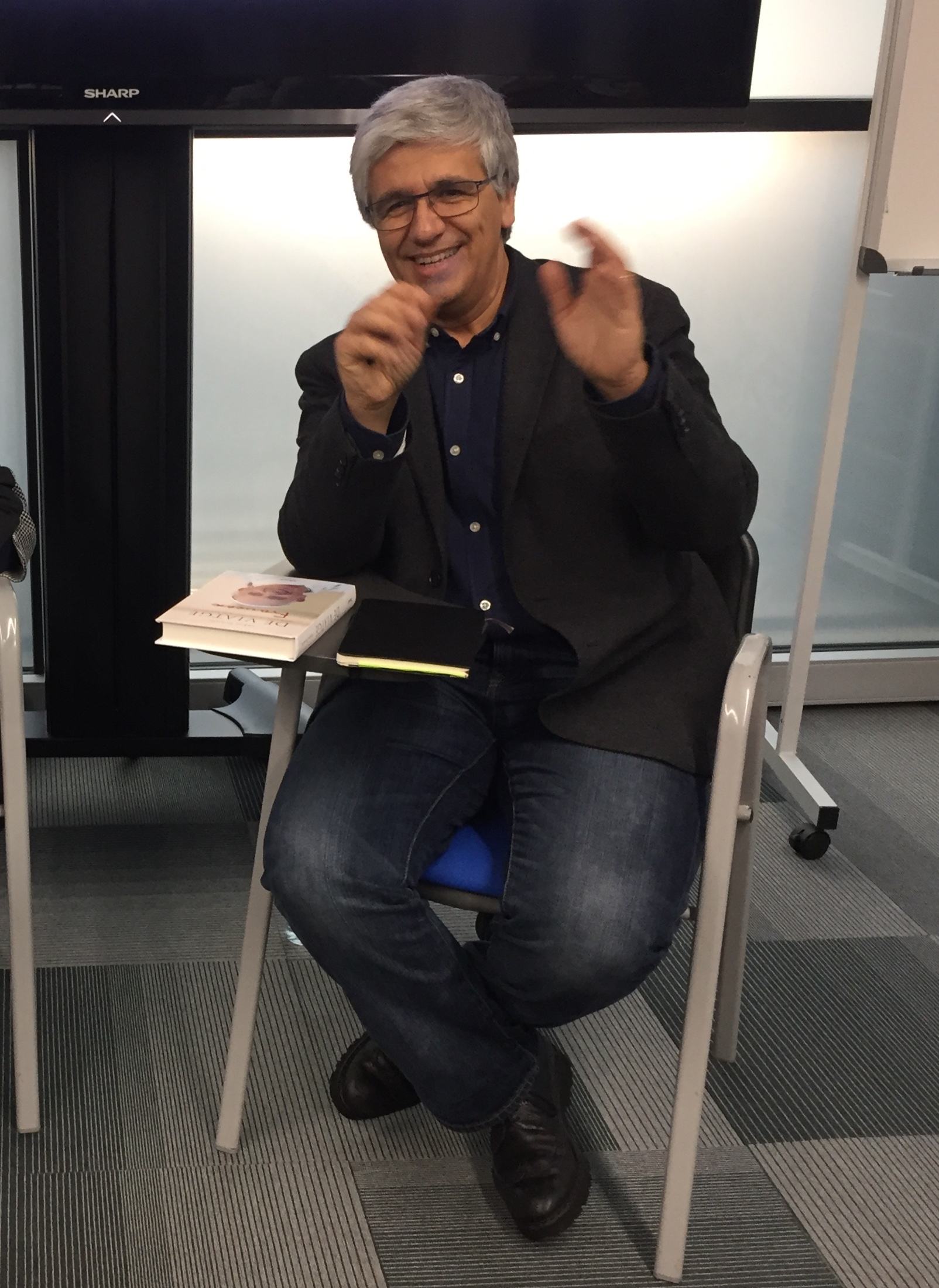
Andrea Tornielli

Andrea Tornielli (born 19 March 1964) is an Italian Catholic journalist and religious writer who serves as the editorial manager for the Vatican's Dicastery for Communication.

== Biography ==
A graduate in History of the Greek language, at the University of Padua, in December 1987, Tornielli became a Roman Catholic journalist and writer. He collaborated at the Catholic newspaper Il Sabato and at the monthly 30Giorni, from 1992 to 1996. He was a journalist at the conservative daily Il Giornale, from 1996 to 2011. He started collaborating at La Stampa, in March 2011, as a Vaticanist, and he is the coordinator of their website Vatican Insider, published in three languages and entirely dedicated to information related to the Vatican and the Catholic Church. He also has a monthly program at Radio Maria.

Tornielli has published many books, mostly on religious matters, which have been translated into several languages, including several biographies and on subjects like Pope Pius XII and the Holocaust, the historical Jesus and Padre Pio.

On 18 December 2018, Pope Francis appointed Tornielli manager of the editorial department of the Dicastery for Communication.

He is married and has three children.

== Books ==
This is the complete list of his books published in Italian:

- Quando la Madonna piange. Veggenti, guaritori, apparizioni. La prima guida al soprannaturale in Italia, Milano, Mondadori, 1995.
- Ultimo incarico: criminale!, with Bruno Contrada, Palermo, Arbor, 1995.
- Il mistero delle lacrime. Inchiesta sulla Madonnina di Civitavecchia, Udine, Segno, 1995.
- Analisi di un mostro. Sedici delitti in diciassette anni senza mai lasciare tracce. Come, quando e perché uccide. Identikit del Mostro di Firenze e la chiave per risolvere il giallo, with Francesco Bruno, Palermo, Arbor, 1996.
- Papa Luciani. Il parroco del mondo, with Alessandro Zangrando, Udine, Segno, 1998.
- Il Giubileo e le indulgenze, Milano, Gribaudi, 1999.
- Giovanni XXIII. Vita di un Padre Santo, Milano, Gribaudi, 2000.
- Fatima. Il segreto svelato, Milano, Gribaudi, 2000.
- Il segreto di Milingo, with Mario Celi, Casale Monferrato, Piemme, 2001.
- Pio XII. Il Papa degli ebrei, Casale Monferrato, Piemme, 2001.
- Dalla penna dei papi. Ritratti, caratteri e segreti dei Pontefici dell'ultimo secolo, with Evi Crotti, Milano, Gribaudi, 2002.
- Maria e il futuro dell'umanità, with Livio Fanzaga, Milano, Gribaudi, 2002.
- Escrivá fondatore dell'Opus Dei, Casale Monferrato, Piemme, 2002.
- Ratzinger. Custode della fede, Casale Monferrato, Piemme, 2002.
- La scelta di Martini, Casale Monferrato, Piemme, 2002.
- Papa Luciani. Il sorriso del santo, with Alessandro Zangrando, Casale Monferrato, Piemme, 2003.
- Paolo VI. Il timoniere del Concilio, Casale Monferrato, Piemme, 2003.
- Il Papa che salvò gli ebrei. Dagli archivi segreti del Vaticano tutta la verità su Pio XII, with Matteo Luigi Napolitano, Casale Monferrato, Piemme, 2004.
- La passione. I vangeli e il film di Mel Gibson, Casale Monferrato, Piemme, 2004.
- L'inganno di Satana, with Livio Fanzaga, Milano, Gribaudi, 2004.
- Gerusalemme. Martini e Tettamanzi insieme per la pace. Il cammino del Consiglio ecumenico delle chiese di Milano, Casale Monferrato, Piemme, 2004.
- Benedetto XVI. Il custode della fede, Casale Monferrato, Piemme, 2005.
- Pacelli, Roncalli e i battesimi della Shoah, with Matteo Luigi Napolitano, Casale Monferrato, Piemme, 2005.
- I miracoli di Papa Wojtyla, Casale Monferrato, Piemme, 2005.
- Inchiesta su Gesù bambino. Misteri, leggende e verità sulla nascita che ha diviso in due la storia, Gribaudi, 2005.
- Partigiani di Dio. Flavio e Gedeone Corrà, with Jacopo Guerriero, Cinisello Balsamo, San Paolo, 2006.
- Attacco alla Chiesa, with Livio Fanzaga, Milano, Gribaudi, 2006.
- Inchiesta sulla resurrezione. Misteri, leggende e verità. Dai Vangeli al Codice da Vinci, Milano, Gribaudi, 2006.
- Papi guerre e terrorismo. Un secolo di magistero sui conflitti che sconvolgono il mondo, with Andrea Gianelli, Milano, Sugarco, 2006.
- Processo al Codice da Vinci. Dal romanzo al film: Gesù e la Maddalena, il priorato di Sion e i quadri di Leonardo. Inchiesta sul mistero, Gribaudi, 2006.
- Il segreto di Padre Pio e Karol Wojtyla, Casale Monferrato, Piemme, 2006.
- Pio XII. Eugenio Pacelli. Un uomo sul trono di Pietro, Milano, Mondadori, 2007.
- Quando la Chiesa sorride. Biografia del cardinale José Saraiva Martins, Roma, Rogate, 2007, 2010 (2nd edition)
- Lourdes. Inchiesta sul mistero a 150 anni dalle apparizioni, with René Laurentin, Roma, Edizioni ART, 2008.
- Padre Pio. L'ultimo sospetto. La verità sul frate delle stimmate, with Saverio Gaeta, Casale Monferrato, Piemme, 2008.
- Perché credo. Una vita per rendere ragione della fede, with Vittorio Messori, Casale Monferrato, Piemme, 2008.
- Paolo VI. L'audacia di un papa, Milano, Mondadori, 2009.
- Santo subito. Il segreto della straordinaria vita di Giovanni Paolo II, Milano, Piemme, 2009.
- Sindone. Inchiesta sul mistero, Milano, Gribaudi, 2010.
- John Henry Newman. Fermate quel convertito, with Andrea Gianelli, Milano, Gribaudi, 2010.
- Attacco a Ratzinger. Accuse e scandali, profezie e complotti contro Benedetto XVI, with Paolo Rodari, Milano, Piemme, 2010.
- Pio IX. L'ultimo papa-re, Milano, Mondadori, 2011.
- La fragile concordia. Stato e cattolici in centocinquant'anni di storia italiana, Milano, BUR Rizzoli, 2011.
- Il futuro e la speranza. Vita e magistero del cardinale Angelo Scola, Milano, Piemme, 2011.
- A.D. 2012. La donna, il drago e l'Apocalisse, with Saverio Gaeta, Milano, Piemme, 2011.
- Carlo Maria Martini. Il profeta del dialogo, Milano, Piemme, 2012.
- Jorge Mario Bergoglio. Francesco. Insieme. La vita, le idee, le parole del papa che cambierà la Chiesa, Milano, Piemme, 2013.
- Padre Pio e la lotta con il demonio, Milano, Fabbri, 2013.
- I fioretti di papa Francesco, Milano, Piemme, 2013.
- L'ultimo miracolo. Perché Giovanni Paolo II è santo, Milano, Piemme, 2014.
- Paolo VI. Il santo della modernità, with Domenico Agasso Jr., Cinisello Balsamo, San Paolo, 2014.
- Paolo VI. Il papa di Francesco. La difesa della fede del papa beatificato da Bergoglio, Milano, Piemme, 2014.
- Papa Francesco. Questa economia uccide, with Giacomo Galeazzi, Milano, Piemme, 2015.
- Il nome di Dio è Misericordia, (A Conversation of Francis (Jorge Mario Bergoglio) with Andrea Tornielli), Milano, Piemme, 2016.
- Francesco. In viaggio, Milano, Piemme, 2017.
- A piedi nella notte, with Domenico Agasso jr., Milano, Piemme, 2018.
- Il giorno del Giudizio, with Gianni Valente, Milano, Piemme, 2018.
- Fratel Ettore & il Miracolo di Rosa Mistica, Milano, Edizioni Ares, 2018.
