= Michael Fagun =

Nigerian Roman Catholic bishop (1935–2025)

His Excellency Michael Fagun
- Bishop Emeritus of Ekiti
- Archdiocese: Ibadan
- Diocese: Ekiti
- Appointed: 30 July 1972
- Term ended: 17 April 2010
- Predecessor: Post created
- Successor: Felix Femi Ajakaye
- Previous posts: Auxiliary Bishop of Ondo and Titular Bishop of Casae Nigrae (1971–1972)

Orders
- Ordination: 4 July 1965 by William R. Field
- Consecration: 10 October 1971 by William R. Field, Anthony Sanusi and Lucas Olu Chukwuka Nwaezeapu

Personal details
- Born: 17 April 1935 Akure, Colony and Protectorate of Nigeria
- Died: 13 October 2025 (aged 90)
- Motto: Confide in Deo

Micheal Patrick Olatunji Fagun (17 April 1935 – 13 October 2025) was a Nigerian Roman Catholic prelate, who served as bishop of Ekiti Diocese. He was Auxiliary Bishop of old Ondo Diocese from 1971 to 1972 when Pope Paul VI created the Diocese of Ado-Ekiti from the Ondo Diocese. He retired from service on 17 April 2010.

== Background and education ==
Michael Fagun was born on 17 April 1935 as the last child to Theophilus Fagun Oganla and Rebecca Fakolde from Ondo State. His parents were non-Catholics who later converted to Catholicism. Fagun had his early education at Sacred Heart Catholic School, Akure from 1943 to 1950 before being admitted to St. Theresa's Minor Seminary, Ibadan for his secondary education from 1952 to 1957. He studied at Saints Peters and Paul Major Seminary, Ibadan from 1957 to 1965 when he was ordained a Catholic priest.

== Priestly career ==
Following his priestly ordination in 1965, Fagun went for further studies at the University of Ibadan from 1966 to 1969 before proceeding to University of Toronto, Canada where he studied for Master of Arts from 1970 to 1971. He served as an assistant parish priest of Oka Parish and Ondo Parish. He taught at St. Joseph's Grammar School, Ondo where he was also the chaplain and became the education secretary of the diocese in 1971. He was the first resident priest in Ekere-Ekiti.

Fagun was appointed auxiliary bishop of Ondo Diocese on 28 June 1971 by Pope Paul VI and was ordained bishop on 10 October 1971. On 20 July 1972, Pope Paul VI created the Diocese of Ado-Ekiti out of Ondo Diocese and appointed Fagun the bishop of the new diocese on 22 October 1972 becoming the first bishop of the diocese. He received his episcopal consecration from Apostolic Nuncio to Nigeria, Archbishop Luigi Poggi at St. Patrick's Cathedral, Ado-Ekiti. After assuming duty at the new diocese, Fagun requested that the Pope rename the Diocese of Ado-Ekiti simply as Ekiti Diocese.

He founded the first indigenous female religious congregation in western Nigeria – Sisters of St. Michael The Archangel in 1986. He served as co-chairman of National Inter-Religious Council. Fagun was chairman of governing council and the pro-chancellor of the Catholic Institute of West Africa (CIWA), Port Harcourt, Nigeria for two terms from 1999 to 2007.

== Retirement and death ==
Fagun retired from service on 17 April 2010 on his 75th birthday. He was succeeded by Bishop Felix Ajakaye.

Fagun died on 13 October 2025, at the age of 90.

Catholic Church titles
| New title | Bishop of Ekiti; 1972–2010 | Succeeded by Felix Femi Ajakaye |
| Preceded by — | Auxiliary Bishop of Ondo; 1971–1972 | Succeeded by — |
| Preceded by Francesco Costantino Mazzieri | Titular Bishop of Casae Nigrae; 1971–1972 | Succeeded by Heriberto Correa Yepes |
