= Paweł Socha (bishop) =

Polish Roman Catholic prelate (1935–2026)

Paweł Socha C.M.
- Auxiliary Bishop of Zielona Góra-Gorzów
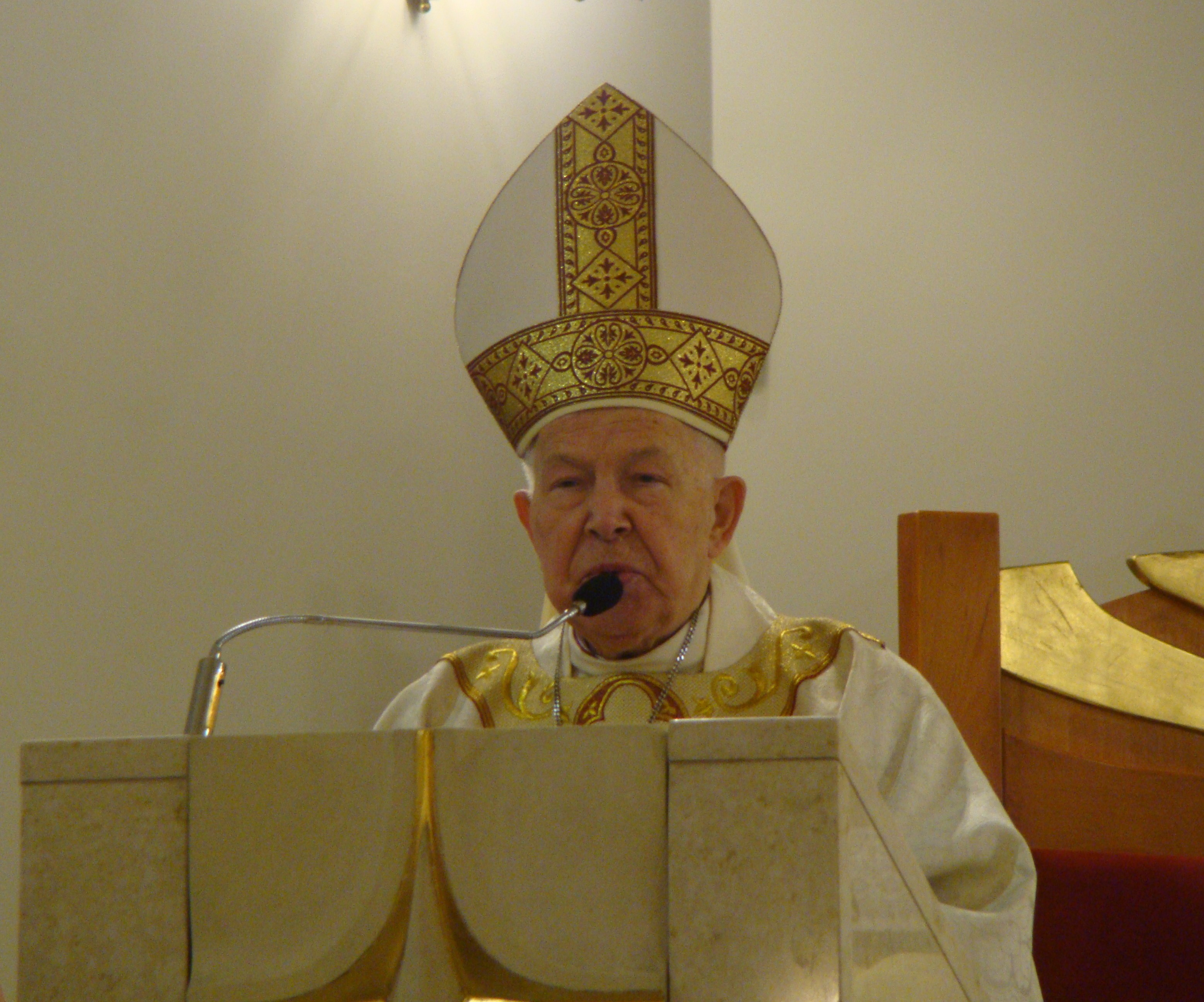
- Socha in 2024
- Church: Roman Catholic Church
- Appointed: 20 November 1973
- Term ended: 16 January 2012
- Other posts: Rector of the Major Theological Seminary in Gościkowo-Paradyż (1975–1978), Vicar General of Zielona Góra-Gorzów (1974–2012), Titular Bishop of Thunigaba (1973–2026)

Orders
- Ordination: 22 May 1958 by Eugeniusz Baziak
- Consecration: 26 December 1973 by Cardinal Karol Wojtyła, Wilhelm Pluta, Jerzy Stroba, Ignacy Jeż and Albin Małysiak

Personal details
- Born: Paweł Socha; 10 January 1935 Wojsławice, Poland
- Died: 29 October 2026 (aged 91) Zielona Góra, Poland
- Education: Major Vincentians Theological Seminary in Kraków, Catholic University of Lublin
- Motto: Facere veritatem in caritate
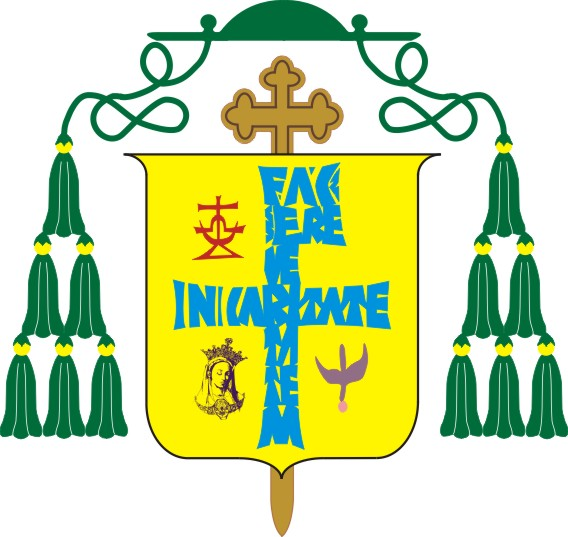
- Coat of arms: Paweł Socha's coat of arms

Paweł Socha C.M. (10 January 1935 – 29 October 2026) was a Polish Roman Catholic prelate who served as an auxiliary bishop of the Diocese of Zielona Góra–Gorzów and was the titular bishop of Thunigaba from 20 November 1973 until his retirement on 16 January 2012.

== Biography ==
Socha was born into a Roman Catholic family in present day Masovian Voivodeship. After graduating from school, he joined the Congregation of the Mission (Vincentian Fathers) in 1951; he made a solemn profession on 8 December 1956. He was ordained a priest on 22 May 1958 after graduating from the Major Vincentians Theological Seminary in Kraków and studying fundamental theology at the Catholic University of Lublin.

After his ordination he was engaged in pastoral and missionary ministry and from 1962 he was a professor at the Major Theological Seminary in Gościkowo-Paradyż. Simultaneously he continued to study at the Catholic University of Lublin, obtaining a Doctor of Theology degree in 1969. From 1975 to 1978, as a bishop, he was also rector of the same Major Theological Seminary.

On 20 November 1973 he was appointed by Pope Paul VI as the auxiliary bishop of the Roman Catholic Diocese of Gorzów and titular bishop of Thunigaba. On 26 December 1973 he was consecrated as a bishop by Cardinal Karol Wojtyła, the future Pope John Paul II, and other prelates.

In 1974, Socha was appointed vicar general of the diocese (it was renamed as the Diocese of Zielona Góra-Gorzów on 25 March 1992) and fulfilled this duty until his retirement on 16 January 2012.

Socha died on 29 October 2026, at the age of 91.

Catholic Church titles
Preceded by —	Auxiliary Bishop of Zielona Góra-Gorzów; 1973–2012	Succeeded by —
Preceded by Julius Babatunde Adelakun	Titular Bishop of Thunigaba; 1973–2026	Succeeded by Sede vacante
