= Diocese of Oyo =

Roman Catholic diocese in Nigeria

Diocese of Oyo Dioecesis Oyoensis

Location
- Country: Nigeria
- Territory: Oyo State
- Ecclesiastical province: Ibadan
- Metropolitan: Ibadan
- Coordinates: 7°51′00″N 3°55′59″E

Statistics
- Area: 18,000 km^{2} (6,900 sq mi)
- Population: Total; Catholics: (as of 2022); 3,767,575; 42,735 (1.1%)
- Parishes: 43

Information
- Denomination: Roman Catholic
- Rite: Latin Rite
- Established: January 18, 1963
- Cathedral: Our Lady of the Assumption Cathedral in Oyo
- Secular priests: 57

Current leadership
- Pope: Leo XIV
- Bishop: Most Rev. Emmanuel Adetoyese Badejo

Map
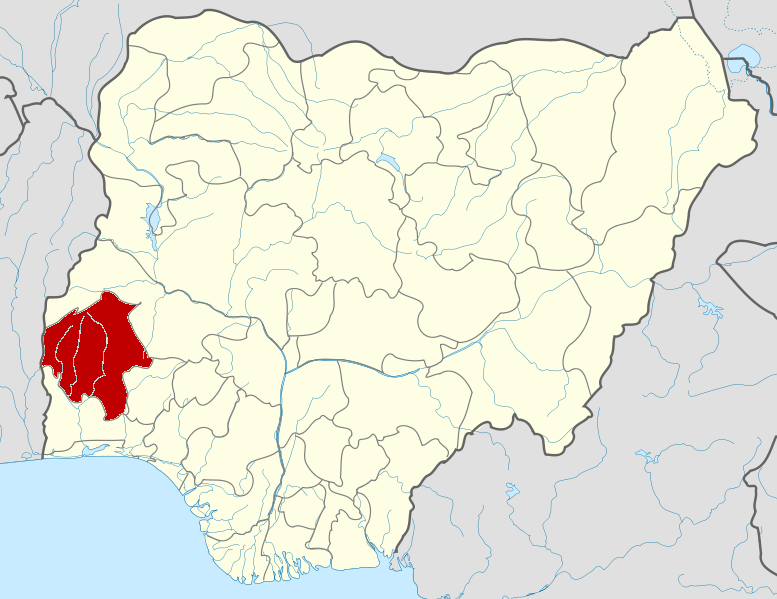
- Oyo is located in Oyo State, shown in red.

Website
- www.catholicdioceseoyo.org

The Roman Catholic Diocese of Oyo (Latin: Oyoën(sis)) is a Latin suffragan diocese in the ecclesiastical province of Ibadan, Nigeria. It still depends on the missionary Roman Congregation for the Evangelization of Peoples.

== History ==
The Apostolic Prefecture of Oyo was erected on territory split from the Apostolic Vicariate of Lagos on March 3, 1949. On January 18, 1963 it was promoted to the Diocese of Oyo, with the Archdiocese of Ibadan as its Metropolitan. On March 3, 1995, portions of the Diocese were removed to the Diocese of Osgobo.

== Special churches ==
The bishops' seat is Oyo Cathedral, otherwise the cathedral of Our Lady of the Assumption in Oyo.

== Statistics ==
In 2014, it pastorally served 36,542 Roman Catholics (1.7% of the population) in a 18,000 km^{2} (6,900 sq mi) area, mostly Muslim. It has 28 parishes and 3 missions with 51 priests (48 diocesan, 3 religious), 44 lay religious (3 brothers, 41 sisters) and 17 seminarians. As of 2004, it consisted of 26 parishes served by 47 priests and 43 religious.

== Bishops ==
(all Roman Rite)

Apostolic Prefect of Oyo

- Father Owen McCoy, White Fathers (M. Afr.) (1 April 1949 – 18 January 1963 see below ↓)

Suffragan Bishops of Oyo

- Owen McCoy, M. Afr. (↑ see above 18 January 1963 – retired 12 April 1973)
- Julius Babatunde Adelakun (13 April 1973 – retired 4 November 2009); previously Auxiliary Bishop of Oyo and Titular Bishop of Thunigaba (16 November 1972 – 13 April 1973)
- Emmanuel Adetoyese Badejo (4 November 2009 – ), succeeding as former Coadjutor Bishop of Oyo (14 August 2007 – 4 November 2009)

=== Coadjutor Bishop ===
- Emmanuel Adetoyese Badejo (2007-2009)

=== Auxiliary Bishops ===
- Julius Babatunde Adelakun (1972-1973), appointed Bishop
- Anthony Olubunmi Okogie (1971-1972), appointed auxiliary bishop of Lagos; future Cardinal

=== Other priests of this diocese who became bishops ===
- Gabriel ’Leke Abegunrin, appointed Bishop of Osogbo in 1995
- Francis Obafemi Adesina (priest, 1989-1995), appointed Bishop of Ijebu-Ode in 2019
- Paul Adegboyega Olawoore, appointed Coadjutor Bishop of Ilorin in 2018
- John Akinkunmi Oyejola, appointed Bishop of Osogbo in 2016

== See also ==
- Roman Catholicism in Nigeria

== External links and sources ==
- GCatholic.org
- Catholic Hierarchy
