= Borut Mavrič =

Slovenian footballer

Personal information
- Date of birth: 27 March 1970 (age 56)
- Place of birth: Šempeter pri Gorici, SFR Yugoslavia
- Height: 1.94 m (6 ft 4 1/2 in)
- Position: Goalkeeper

Youth career
- 1991–1993: Primorje

Senior career*
Years	Team	Apps	(Gls)
1993–1994	Primorje	23	(0)
1994–2002	Gorica	220	(0)
2002–2004	Olimpija	62	(0)
2004–2007	Greuther Fürth	72	(0)
2007–2008	Gorica	0	(0)

International career
2003	Slovenia B	1	(0)
2004–2006	Slovenia	18	(0)
- * Club domestic league appearances and goals

Borut Mavrič (born 27 March 1970) is a former Slovenian footballer. He represented Slovenia internationally.

== Club career ==
Mavrič was born in Šempeter pri Gorici.

Greuther Fürth signed Mavrič in summer 2004 from Olimpija in a one-year deal and later signed a two-year extension in March 2005. He was released in March 2007, returning to Slovenia.

== International career ==
Mavrič earned a total of 18 caps for Slovenia, scoring no goals.
