= Gabriel Ojeleke Abegunrin =

Nigerian Catholic prelate

The Most Reverend Gabriel Ojeleke Abegunrin
- Archdiocese: Ibadan
- Predecessor: Felix Alaba Adeosin Job

Orders
- Ordination: 21 April 1979
- Consecration: 13 May 1995 by Osvaldo Padilla

Personal details
- Born: 29 September 1949 Iwere-Ile, Oyo State
- Denomination: Catholic

Gabriel Ojeleke Abegunrin (born 29 September 1949) is a Nigerian Catholic prelate who has served as Catholic archbishop of Ibadan since 2003.
