= Nataša Govekar =

Slovenian theologian (born 1975)

Director of the Theological-Pastoral Department at the Dicastery for Communication
- Incumbent
- Assumed office February 9, 2016

Personal details
- Born: 1975 (age 50–51) Šempeter pri Gorici, Slovenia
- Education: University of Ljubljana, Pontifical Gregorian University

Nataša Govekar (born 1975) is a Slovenian theologian and communications professional for Vatican City who has been the Director of the Theological-Pastoral Department at the Holy See's Dicastery for Communication since 2016, and previously worked as a professor specializing in the transmission of faith through images.

== Biography ==
Govekar was born in Šempeter pri Gorici, Slovenia in 1975. She studied theology and Slovene at the University of Ljubljana before earning her Doctor of Missiology from the Pontifical Gregorian University: her thesis was "The Transmission of Faith through Images in the Case of the Basilica of St. Mary Magdalene in Vezelay".

She went on to work as a professor at the Theology Atelier of Cardinal Tomáš Špidlík at the Centro Aletti. There, she worked closely with Marko Rupnik, then one of the most influential modern Catholic artists and a priest. She also co-wrote multiple books with him.

On February 9, 2016, it was announced that Govekar would be appointed by Pope Francis to take the role of Director of the Theological-Pastoral Department at the Dicastery for Communication. The announcement emphasized her youth and the fact she is a female theologian. Her role focuses on pastoral communications and the faith content of the Vatican's posts, among other things, and has emphasized newness: she has stated "Creativity is always part of the process. You can never just cut and paste from the past". She has often called for community-building, and praised measures that would expand the role of women in the church.

She has also worked on social media content of the Vatican, and stated that for Pope Francis, the most effective mechanism was to "just be the pope": inspirational posts of prayer, according to her, had a higher share rate.

She has continued in the role under Pope Leo XIV, and gained attention for her remarks on AI at a bishop's meeting in Hong Kong, calling for an "ecology of communication" and exhorting Catholics to think about when not to use chatbots. She has also emphasized "demystifying" artificial intelligence in order to avoid seeking to be "like God without God", and stated that priests should not use AI to generate their homilies, and should not AI-generate pictures of religious figures.

In 2026, she addressed Christian influencers, stating that audience size is not the only metric of influence and calling for influencers to see themselves as "weavers of communion", working together and not alone. She also discussed a training program, "Faith Communication in the Digital World", her dicastery runs which trains Christian communications professionals and influencers.

Her connection with Rupnik went on to be scrutinized upon allegations he sexually assaulted many women: the digital liturgical calendar her department put out continued to still utilize many of his pieces of artwork despite the allegations. This was criticized by several theologians and papal historians.

In 2021, the Catholic Information Agency of Zagreb reported that she was one of the ten most influential women at the Vatican.
