= Holy See Press Office =

Official agency of the Holy See

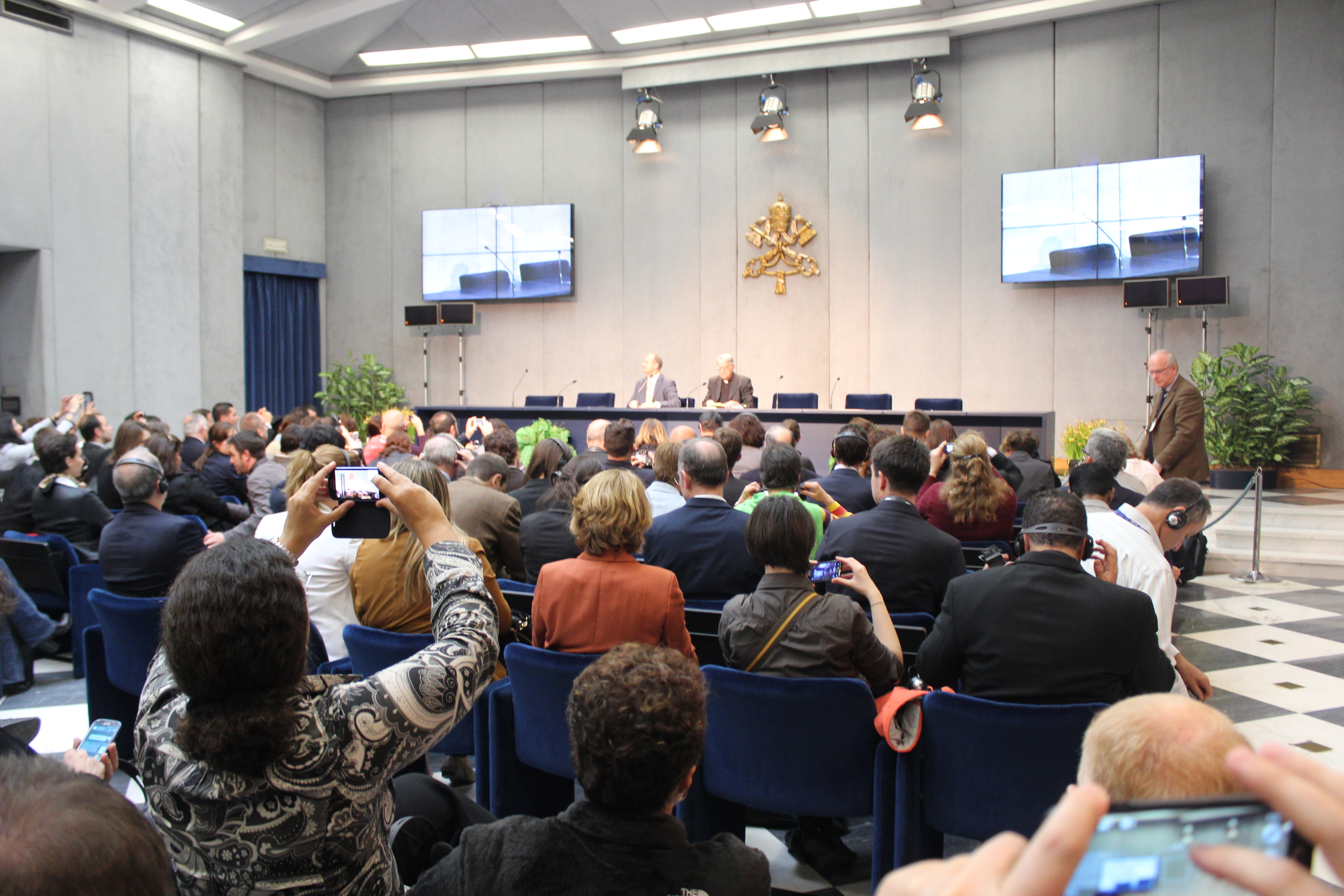
Sala Stampa

The Holy See Press Office (Latin: Sala Stampa Sanctae Sedis; Italian: Sala Stampa della Santa Sede) is the press office of the Holy See. It publishes the official news of the activities of the Pope and of the various departments of the Roman Curia. All speeches, messages and documents, as well as the statements issued by the Director, are published in their entirety.

The press office is located outside Vatican City, in Via della Conciliazione.

== Role ==
The press office operates every day in Italian, although texts in other languages are also available.

On 27 June 2015, Pope Francis, through an apostolic letter issued motu proprio ("on his own initiative"), established the Secretariat for Communication in the Roman Curia. The Press Office was incorporated into it, but at the same time belongs to the Secretariat of State. On 21 December 2015, Pope Francis appointed Dr. Greg Burke, formerly the Communications Advisor for the Section for General Affairs of the Vatican's Secretariat of State (a key department in the Roman Curia), as Deputy Director of the Press Office.

Following Burke's appointment as director in 2016, Spanish journalist Paloma García Ovejero took over as vice director, making her the first woman to hold that position. It was also announced that both Burke and García Ovejero, both laymen, would later begin their positions on 1 August 2016. On 31 December 2018, both Burke and García Ovejero announced their resignations. Pope Francis has therefore appointed Italian journalist Alessandro Gisotti, former deputy editor-in-chief of Vatican Radio, as interim director of the Holy See Press Office.

In July 2019, Pope Francis named British-born Italian layman Matteo Bruni as Director. Bruni is the first non-journalist to serve in this position. The same month, the Pope appointed Brazilian laywoman Cristiane Murray, who previously served as the Vatican Radio commentator for papal events and international trips for 25 years, as Vice Director. Murray was succeeded by Croatian nun and journalist Nina Benedikta Krapić on 1 March 2026.

== Directors ==
| No. | Portrait | Name (birth–death) | Term of office | | |
| No. | Portrait | Name (birth–death) | Took office | Left office | Time in office |
|---|---|---|---|---|---|
| 1 | | Angelo Fausto Vallainc (1916–1986) | 19 October 1966 | 4 July 1970 | 3 years, 258 days |
| 2 | | Federico Alessandrini (1905–1983) | 11 July 1970 | 3 June 1976 | 5 years, 328 days |
| 3 | | Romeo Panciroli (1923–2006) | 3 June 1976 | 5 September 1977 | 1 year, 94 days |
| 3 | | Romeo Panciroli (1923–2006) | 5 September 1977 | 4 November 1984 | 7 years, 60 days |
| 4 | | Joaquín Navarro-Valls (1936–2017) | 6 December 1984 | 11 July 2006 | 21 years, 249 days |
| 5 | | Federico Lombardi (born 1942) | 11 July 2006 | 1 August 2016 | 10 years, 21 days |
| 6 | | Greg Burke (born 1959) | 1 August 2016 | 31 December 2018 | 2 years, 152 days |
| – | | Alessandro Gisotti (born 1974); Acting | 31 December 2018 | 21 July 2019 | 202 days |
| 7 | | Matteo Bruni (born 1976) | 21 July 2019 | Incumbent | 6 years, 358 days |

== Vice Directors ==
- Ciro Benedettini (unknown, 2012, unknown)
- Paloma García Ovejero (2016–2018)
- Cristiane Murray (2019–2026)
- Nina Benedikta Krapić (2026–present)

== See also ==
- Index of Vatican City-related articles
