= Gerald Smyth =

British Army officer (1885–1920)

Lieutenant-Colonel Gerald Bryce Ferguson Smyth, DSO and Bar, French Croix de Guerre and Belgian Croix de guerre (7 September 1885 – 17 July 1920) was a British Army officer and police officer who was at the centre of a mutiny in the ranks of the Royal Irish Constabulary during the Irish War of Independence. He was shot and killed by the Irish Republican Army in Cork in 1920.

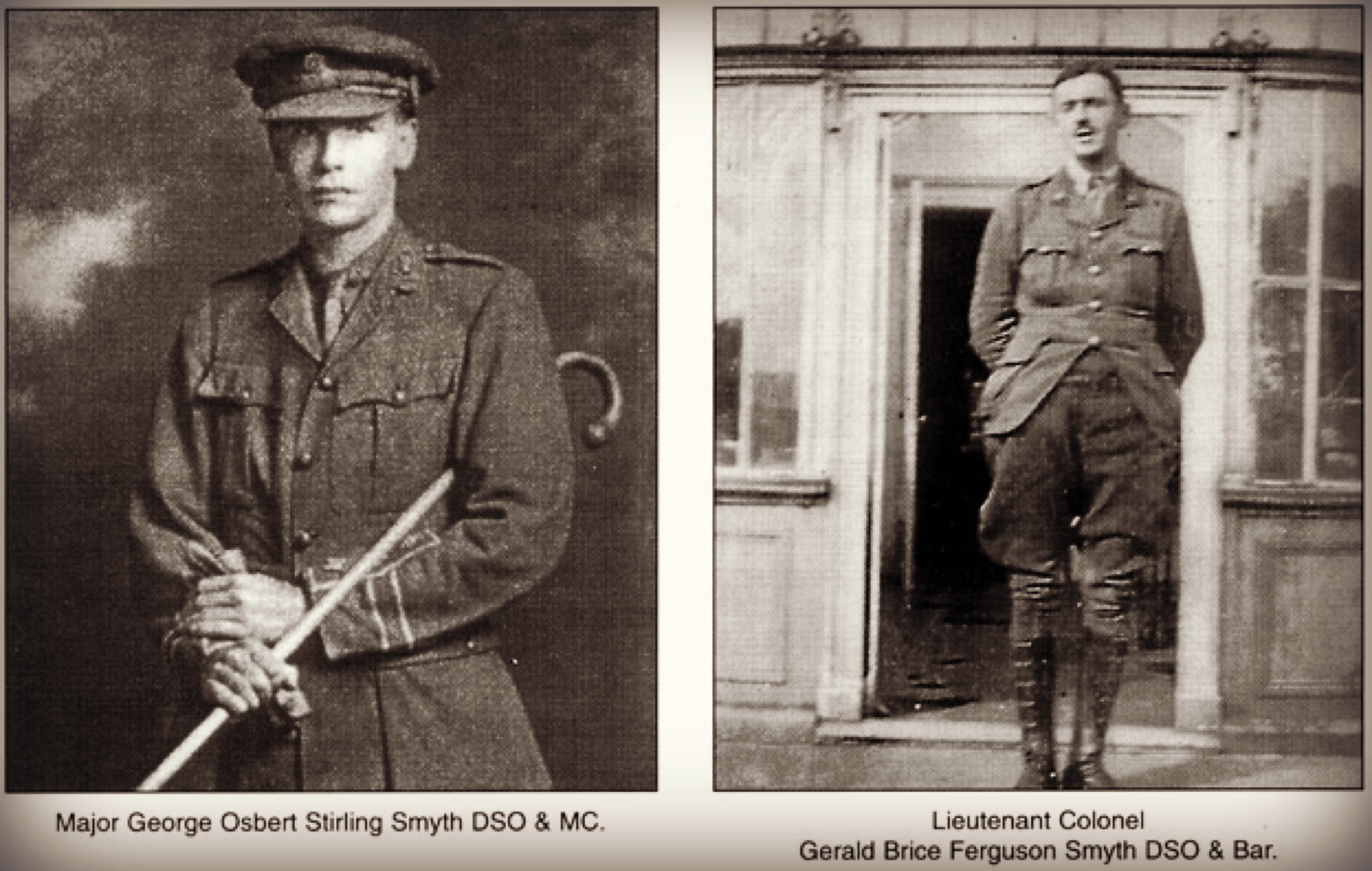
A picture of the Smyth brothers: Osbert Smyth (left) and Gerald Smyth (right)

== Background ==
Gerald Smyth was born at Phoenix Lodge, Dalhousie, Punjab, India, the eldest son of George Smyth and Helen Ferguson Smyth. His father was the British High Commissioner in the Punjab and his mother was the daughter of Thomas Ferguson of Banbridge, County Down, Ireland. Smyth had one brother, George Osbert Smyth, who also served as a British Army officer. Both served in the First World War and in Ireland during the War of Independence.

Smyth was educated privately and as a pupil of Strangeways School and then Shrewsbury School between 1899 and 1901.

== Military service ==
After attending the Royal Military Academy, Woolwich, Gerald Smyth was commissioned into the Royal Engineers 29 July 1905 and excelled in mathematics and the Spanish language. He was posted to Gibraltar, serving with the 32nd and 45th companies and spending his free time with polo, photography and mountaineering, sustaining a serious injury to his shoulder during a trip to the Sierra Nevada mountains. In 1913 he was posted to the Curragh in Ireland where he served with the 17th Field Company.

== First World War ==
Smyth volunteered at the outbreak of World War I even though he had been offered a position as Professor of Mathematics at the Royal School of Military Engineering, Chatham. He was sent to France on 17 August 1914 with the 14th Company and promoted to Captain in October. Serving throughout the war he was seriously injured on a number of occasions, losing his left arm at the elbow during the Battle of the Aisne at Givenchy whilst rescuing a wounded soldier who was caught in the open under heavy shellfire. From 1916 onwards he left the Royal Engineers and served with the Kings Own Scottish Borderers. He was mentioned in despatches seven times and awarded the DSO twice. He served with the 6th Battalion of the KOSB at the Battle of Arras, the only unit to attain its objective on 3 May 1917. He was cited for a mention in dispatches for "consistent skill and daring," after being severely wounded, receiving shrapnel pieces in his right shoulder which at the time was believed would permanently weaken his arm. The citation in the London Gazette of 18 July 1917 read as follows:

"For conspicuous gallantry and devotion to duty. Although seriously wounded he remained at the telephone in an ill-protected trench for many hours during a critical time, to report the course of events to Brigade Headquarters. He realised that there was no other officer of experience to replace him and his sense of duty may cost him his remaining arm, the other having been amputated as a result of a previous wound."

Smyth would finish his First World War service as a brevet brigadier general commanding the 93rd Infantry Brigade of the 31st Division, despite being only 33. He would spend a year at Staff College before accepting command of the 12th Field Company in Cork on 7 June 1920, later being appointed divisional commander of the Royal Irish Constabulary in Munster.

In his memoirs, Brigadier General Walker wrote of Smyth in the Royal Engineers Journal: "No words can do justice to his services during the retreat of 1914. He was the life and soul of the Company, his Irish humour and pluck did wonders in maintaining the discipline of the Company".

In June 1920, Colonel Smyth was sent to Ireland at the height of the Irish War of Independence. He was seconded to the Royal Irish Constabulary, of which he was appointed divisional commissioner for the province of Munster.

== Listowel ==
On 19 June 1920 Smyth allegedly made a speech to the ranks of the Listowel RIC in which he was reported to have said:

"Police and military will patrol the country roads at least five nights a week. They are not to confine themselves to the main roads but make across the country, lie in ambush, take cover behind fences near roads, and when civilians are seen approaching shout: 'Hands up!' Should the order be not obeyed, shoot, and shoot with effect. If the persons approaching carry their hands in their pockets or are in any way suspicious looking, shoot them down. You may make mistakes occasionally and innocent persons may be shot, but that cannot be helped and you are bound to get the right persons sometimes. The more you shoot the better I will like you; and I assure you that no policeman will get into trouble for shooting any man and I will guarantee that your names will not be given at the inquest."

There has been debate over the accuracy of this reported speech. The Freeman's Journal later reported that it was polemically based to discredit British governance.

One officer, Constable Jeremiah Mee, responded to Smyth's speech by placing his gun on the table and calling Smyth a murderer. Smyth ordered Mee's arrest, but the RIC men present refused. Mee and thirteen other RIC officers resigned, with most going on to join or assist the Irish Republican Army. Mee became a confidant and ally of Michael Collins.

However, Mee's claims were denied by Smyth plus Major General Henry Hugh Tudor and Inspector John M. Regan, who were both present at the occasion. Smyth was summoned to London to brief Prime Minister David Lloyd George and his own written account of his remarks was read to Parliament and debated:

"I wish to make the present situation clear to all ranks. A policeman is perfectly justified in shooting any person seen with arms (guns) who does not immediately throw up his hands when ordered. A policeman is perfectly justified in shooting any man who he has good reason to believe is carrying arms (guns) and who does not immediately throw up his arms when ordered. Every proper precaution will be taken at police inquests that no information will be given to Sinn Fein as to the identity of any individual or the movements of the police. I wish to make it perfectly clear to all ranks that I will not tolerate reprisals. They bring discredit on the police and I will deal most severely with any officer or man concerned in them."

== Death ==
Colonel Smyth's speech marked him for attention from the IRA. He subsequently returned to Cork and took lodgings at the Cork & County Club, an Anglo-Irish social club. On the evening of 17 July 1920 he was in the smoking room when a six-man IRA team led by Dan "Sandow" O'Donovan entered and allegedly said to him, "Colonel, were not your orders to shoot on sight? Well you are in sight now, so prepare." Colonel Smyth jumped to his feet before being riddled with bullets. Despite being shot twice in the head, once through the heart and twice through the chest, the Colonel staggered to the passage where he dropped dead. He was 34 years old.

Colonel Gerald Smyth was buried at Banbridge, County Down on 21 July 1920. His funeral was followed by a three-day sectarian riot during which a Protestant man William Steritt was shot and killed, two days after attending his funeral. Three Irish nationalists were later convicted of firearms offences. The date of Smyth's burial coincided with the mass expulsion or "clearing" of Catholics, Socialists and Protestants (that were considered disloyal) from Belfast's shipyards, foundries, linen mills and other commercial concerns that was part of The Troubles in Ulster (1920-1922).

Smyth's brother, George Osbert Smyth, allegedly became a member of the Dublin District Special Branch, nicknamed the Cairo Gang, a group of British intelligence officers in Dublin sent specially to spy on leading IRA figures. Osbert Smyth was fatally shot in October 1920 while trying to arrest IRA members Dan Breen and Seán Treacy at a house in Drumcondra. Several other Cairo Gang members were shot dead early in the morning of Bloody Sunday, 21 November 1920, on the orders of Michael Collins.

Smyth was honoured by the Orange Order who renamed Loyal Orange Lodge 518 as the 'Colonel Smyth Memorial Lodge' (Steritt was similarly commemorated by Orange Lodge 257). According to historians Tom Mahon and James Gillogly, "Smyth was the most senior police officer killed in the conflict."
