= Diocese of Ondo =

Roman Catholic diocese in Nigeria

Dioecesis Ondoensis

Location
- Country: Nigeria
- Territory: Ondo State
- Ecclesiastical province: Ibadan
- Metropolitan: Ibadan
- Coordinates: 7°15′0″N 5°11′42″E, Akure

Statistics
- Area: 15,500 km^{2} (6,000 sq mi)
- Population: Total; Catholics: (as of 2022); 3,796,600; 177,248 (4.7%)
- Parishes: 64

Information
- Denomination: Roman Catholic
- Rite: Latin Rite
- Established: 18 April 1950
- Cathedral: Sacred Heart Cathedral in Akure
- Secular priests: 111

Current leadership
- Pope: Leo XIV
- Bishop: Most Rev. Jude Ayodeji Arogundade
- Bishops emeritus: Francis Folorunsho Clement Alonge

Map
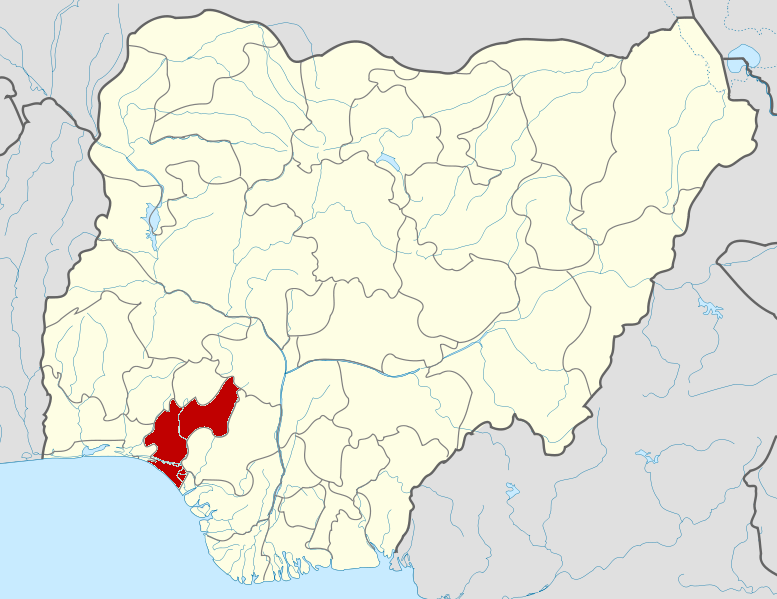
- Ondo State is shown in red.

Website
- www.ondodiocese.org

The Roman Catholic Diocese of Ondo (Latin: Ondoën(sis)) is a diocese located in the Ondo State in the ecclesiastical province of Ibadan in Nigeria. The cathedral and diocesan secretariat are located in Akure.

== History ==
- 12 January 1943: Established as Apostolic Vicariate of Ondo-Ilorin from the Apostolic Vicariate of Benin Coast
- 18 April 1950: Promoted as Diocese of Ondo

On 12 January 1943 the Vicariate of Ondo-Ilorin, consisting of the Civil Provinces of Ondo and Ilorin, was carved out of both the Vicariate of Asaba-Benin and the Vicariate of the Bight of Benin. Bishop Thomas Hughes S.M.A. was the vicar apostolic. In 1950, this Vicariate of Ondo-Ilorin became the Diocese of Ondo. Bishop Hughes, S.M.A., was appointed bishop of this new diocese. On his death in 1957, he was succeeded by Dr. William R. Field, S.M.A., consecrated bishop on 27 April 1958.

On 6 December 1960, the Prefecture of Ilorin was carved out of the Diocese of Ondo with Bishop William Mahony, SMA, as its first bishop.

On 10 October 1971, Dr. Michael O. Fagun became the first auxiliary bishop of Ondo Diocese and when the Diocese of Ekiti was detached from the Diocese of Ondo on 10 October 1972, he became first diocesan bishop of Ekiti.

On 21 April 1974, Dr. Francis F. Alonge was ordained the auxiliary bishop of Ondo Diocese, and on the retirement of Bishop Field, he became the diocesan bishop and his episcopal enthronement took place in the Sacred Heart Cathedral, Akure, on 22 August 1976.

On 6 May 2010, Dr Jude Arogundade was consecrated bishop and was appointed as a co-adjutor to Dr. Francis Alonge in the Diocese of Ondo. Upon the acceptance of the letter of resignation of Bishop Alonge by Pope Benedict XVI on 26 November 2010, Bishop Jude succeeded Bishop Alonge and was enthroned as the bishop of the diocese on 14 January 2011 at the Sacred Heart Cathedral Akure, Ondo State, Nigeria.

The Diocese of Ondo, as it is today, is within Ondo State. The number of parishes, Mass centers and priests has grown tremendously over the years. Today, the diocese has fifty parishes and Mass centers, and the diocese has over ninety priests serving within and outside the diocese. The diocese has an area of 15,518 sqm. With a population of about 3,225,255 of whom 265,000 are Catholics. The diocesan headquarters is Akure, the Capital City of Ondo State.

== Special churches ==
- The cathedral is Sacred Heart Cathedral in Akure
- Catholic Chaplaincy Rufus Giwa Polytechnic Owo,
- Christ the King Catholic church Alagbaka Estate Akure,
- Mary Help of Christians' Church Araromi Akure,
- Mary Mother of God Ogbese,
- Mary the Virgin Catholic Church Ijare,
- Mary Queen of Angels Church Akure,
- Mary Queen of Apostles Ijoka Akure,
- Our lady Star of the Sea Catholic Church Okitipupa,
- Our lady of Mount Carmel Ikare Akoko,
- Our Lady of the Holy Rosary Ile Oluji,
- Our Lady Queen of Peace Catholic Chaplaincy Adeyemi College of Education Ondo,
- Our Lady of Good Counsel Catholic Church Iwaro Oka Akoko,
- Queen of Peace Catholic Church, Ikun Akoko,
- St Anne Catholic Church Oke Agunla Ondo,
- St Albert Catholic Chaplaincy FUT Akure,
- St Augustine Catholic Church Ilu Tuntun,
- St Augustine Catholic Chaplaincy AAU Akungba Akoko,
- St Benedict Catholic Chaplaincy, Army Barracks Akure,
- St Clare Catholic Church Owalushi, Iwaro Oka Akoko,
- St Don Bosco Catholic Church Ijapo Estate Akure,
- St Don Bosco Catholic Church Ondo,
- St Francis Catholic Church Irun Akoko,
- St Francis Catholic Church Oke Aro Akure,
- St Francis Catholic church Owaluwa Owo,
- St George Catholic Church Ile Oluji,
- St Gregory Catholic Church Ikare Akoko,
- St James Catholic Church Oke Igbo,
- St John the Evangelist Catholic Church Okitipupa,
- St Joseph Catholic Church Ife Road Ondo,
- St Joseph Catholic Church Igbara Oke,
- St Joseph Catholic Mass Centre NNPC Akure,
- St Leo Catholic Church Ayeyemi Ondo,
- St Louis Catholic Church Ondo Bye pass Akure,
- St Matthew Catholic church Oke Paadi Ondo,
- St Patrick Catholic Church Odoode Idanre,
- St Patrick Catholic church Ondo,
- St Patrick Catholic Church Oke Oka Akoko,
- St Paul Catholic Church Ore,
- St Paul Catholic Church Shagari Village Akure,
- St Peter Catholic Church Ilara Mokin,
- St Peter Catholic Church Ode Irele,
- St Pius Catholic Church Agba Oka Akoko,
- St Pius Catholic Church Igbotako,
- St Raphael Catholic Church Lijoka Ore,
- St Stephen Catholic church Oke Ogun Owo,
- St Theresa Catholic Church Alade-Idanre,
- St Theresa SMA Catholic Church Ayedun Quarters Akure,
- The Catholic Church of Ascension Ore,
- The Catholic Church of Annunciation Oba Ile,
- St Joseph Catholic church Ishua Akoko
- St Jude Catholic Church Ugbe Akoko
- St Thomas Catholic mass centre Oyinmo Ikare Akoko

== Bishops ==
- Vicar Apostolic of Ondo-Ilorin (Roman rite)
  - Bishop Thomas Hughes, S.M.A. (1943.01.12 – 1950.04.18 see below)
- Bishops of Ondo (Roman rite)
  - Bishop Thomas Hughes, S.M.A. (see above 1950.04.18 – 1957.04.17)
  - Bishop William Richard Field, S.M.A. (1958.01.16 – 1976.05.31)
  - Bishop Francis Folorunsho Clement Alonge (1976.05.31 - 2010.11.26)
  - Bishop Jude Ayodeji Arogundade (since 2010.11.26); had been the coadjutor bishop (2010)

The list above includes a coadjutor who served in 2010.

=== Auxiliary bishops ===
- Francis Folorunsho Clement Alonge (1973–1976), appointed bishop here
- Michael Patrick Olatunji Fagun (1971–1972), appointed Bishop of Ekiti

== Persecution and insecurity ==
Although removed from the Middle Belt and North of Nigeria, where most incidents of persecution take place, Ondo witnessed a tragic massacre, carried out by unknown gunmen, in St. Francis Xavier Church in Owo, on 5 June 2022, during Pentecost Sunday celebrations. The attack left over 50 people dead. Five men were arrested and charged for the attack, with four being found guilty and one acquitted. The Catholic bishop of Ondo, Jude Arogundade, expressed his relief and hope that the families of the victims could now find closure.

== See also ==
- Roman Catholicism in Nigeria

== Sources ==
- GCatholic.org Information
- Catholic Hierarchy
