= Archdiocese of Ibadan =

Roman Catholic archdiocese in Nigeria

Archdiocese of Ibadan Archidioecesis Ibadanensis

Location
- Country: Nigeria
- Territory: Oyo State
- Ecclesiastical province: Ibadan
- Coordinates: 7°23′47″N 3°55′0″E

Statistics
- Area: 28,000 km^{2} (11,000 sq mi)
- Population: Total; Catholics: (as of 2022); 3,875,000; 242,892 (6.3%)
- Parishes: 54

Information
- Denomination: Catholic Church
- Sui iuris church: Latin Church
- Rite: Roman Rite
- Established: Diocese: 28 April 1958; Archdiocese:26 March 1994
- Cathedral: Saint Mary's Cathedral in Ibadan.
- Secular priests: 121

Current leadership
- Pope: Leo XIV
- Archbishop: Gabriel Ojeleke Abegunrin
- Suffragans: Ekiti, Ilorin, Ondo, Osogbo, Oyo
- Bishops emeritus: Felix Alaba Adeosin Job

Map
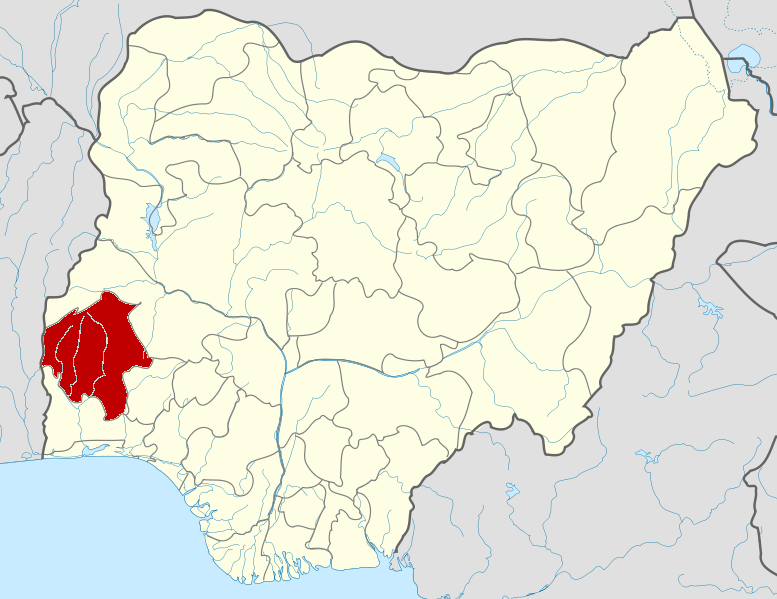
- Oyo State shown in red

Website
- ArchdioceseofIbadan.org

The Archdiocese of Ibadan (Latin: Archidioecesis Ibadanensis) is a Latin Church ecclesiastical territory or archdiocese of the Catholic Church in Ibadan, Nigeria.

== History ==
- 13 March 1952: Established as Apostolic Prefecture of Ibadan from the Metropolitan Archdiocese of Lagos
- 28 April 1958: Promoted as Diocese of Ibadan
- 26 March 1994: Promoted as Metropolitan Archdiocese of Ibadan

== Special churches ==
The seat of the archbishop is Saint Mary’s Cathedral in Ibadan.

== Bishops ==
- Prefect Apostolic of Ibadan (Roman rite)
  - Father Richard Finn, S.M.A., 13 March 1953 – 28 April 1958 see below
- Bishops of Ibadan (Roman rite)
  - Bishop Richard Finn, S.M.A., see above 28 April 1958 – 3 July 1974
  - Bishop Felix Alaba Adeosin Job, 5 October 1974 – 26 March 1994 see below
- Metropolitan Archbishops of Ibadan (Roman rite)
  - Archbishop Felix Alaba Adeosin Job, see above 26 March 1994 – 24 January 2014
  - Archbishop Gabriel Ojeleke Abegunrin, 24 January 2014 – present

=== Auxiliary Bishop ===
- Felix Alaba Adeosin Job (1971-1974), appointed Bishop here

=== Other priest of this diocese who became bishop ===
- Peter Kayode Odetoyinbo, appointed Bishop of Abeokuta in 2014

== Suffragan Dioceses ==
- Roman Catholic Diocese of Ekiti
- Roman Catholic Diocese of Ilorin
- Roman Catholic Diocese of Ondo
- Roman Catholic Diocese of Osogbo
- Roman Catholic Diocese of Oyo

== See also ==
- Roman Catholicism in Nigeria
- Anglican Province of Ibadan
- Anglican Diocese of Ibadan

== Sources ==
- Official website of the Archdiocese of Ibadan
- GCatholic.org Information
- Roman Catholic Bishops Conference of Nigeria
- Catholic Secretariat of Nigeria
