= Greg Burke (journalist) =

American journalist

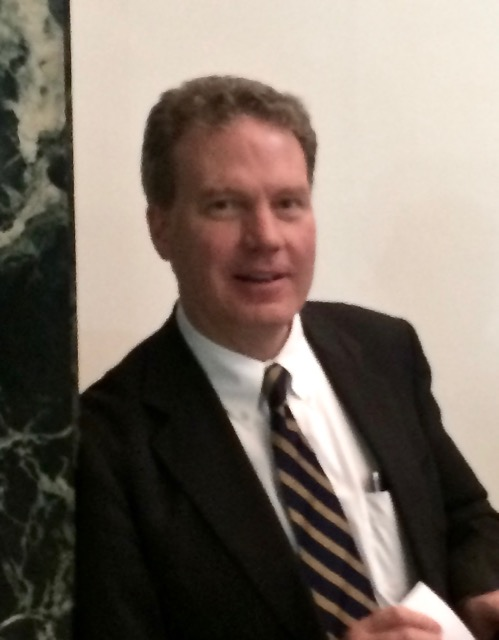
- Born: Gregory Joseph Burke; November 8, 1959 (age 66); St. Louis, Missouri, U.S.
- Education: Columbia University
- Occupation: Former director of the Holy See Press Office
- Predecessor: Federico Lombardi
- Successor: Matteo Bruni

Gregory Joseph Burke (born November 8, 1959) is an American journalist. He was formerly the director of the Holy See Press Office, a position in which he succeeded Federico Lombardi, and was succeeded by Matteo Bruni.

== Career ==
Burke was formerly a correspondent for the Fox News and for Time magazine, while based in Rome. In June 2012 it was announced he would be taking up the position of senior communications advisor for the Section for General Affairs of the Vatican's Secretariat of State.

He was appointed vice director of the Holy See Press Office in December 2015, and was promoted to director August 1, 2016, succeeding Frederico Lombardi.

On December 31, 2018, he announced his intention to resign his appointment at the Holy See, being succeeded by Matteo Bruni. In September 2019, he became director of communications at IESE Business School.

== Personal life ==
Burke is from St. Louis, Missouri. He is a graduate of St. Louis University High School and the Columbia University School of Journalism. He is a member of Opus Dei.
