= Matteo Bruni =

Italian-British director of the Holy See Press Office (born 1976)

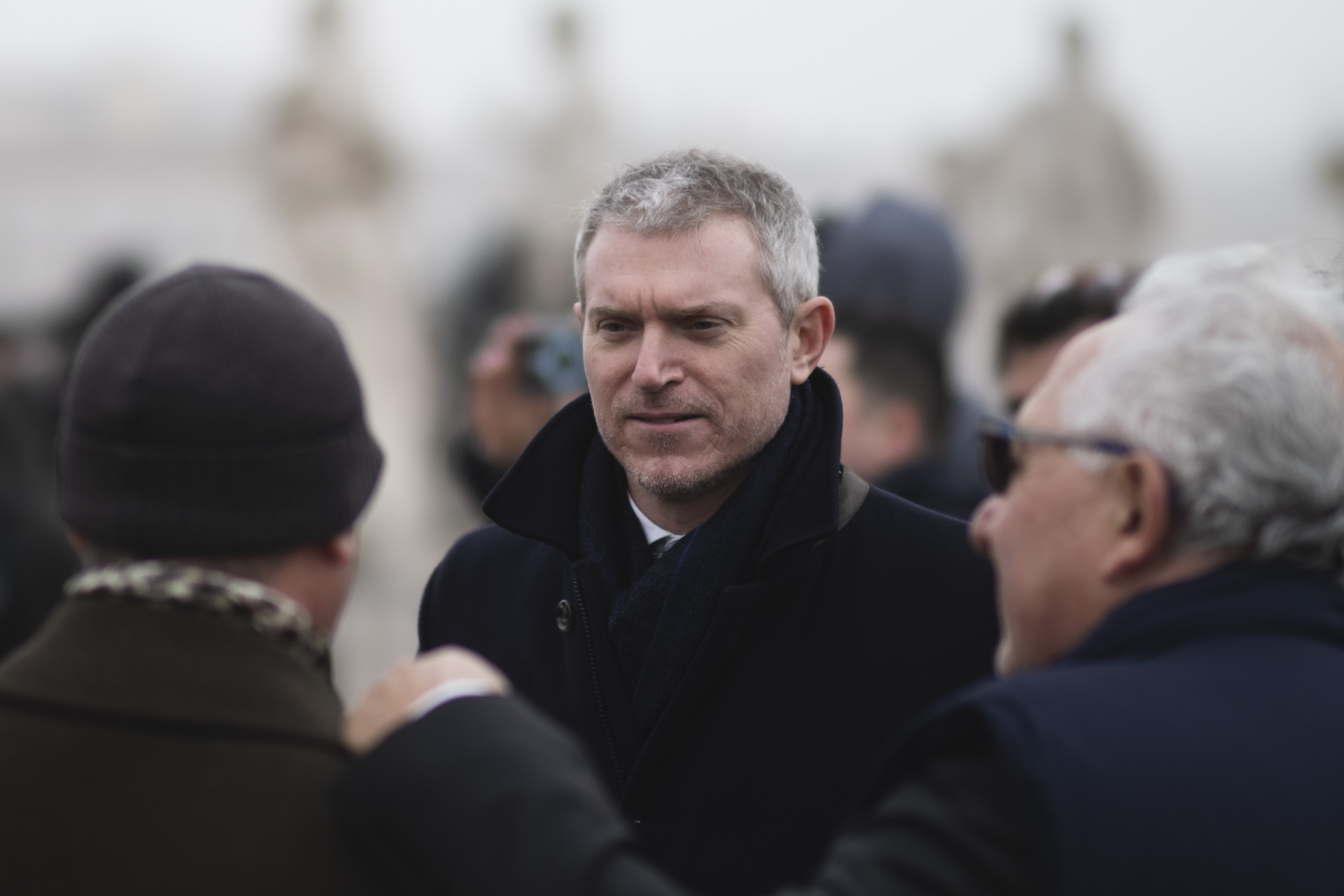

Director of the Holy See Press Office
- Incumbent
- Assumed office 22 July 2019
- Preceded by: Greg Burke

Personal details
- Born: 23 November 1976 (age 49) Winchester, United Kingdom
- Children: 1
- Education: La Sapienza University, Rome

Matteo Bruni (born 23 November 1976) is an Italian-British media professional who serves as director of the Holy See Press Office of the Roman Curia. He was appointed on 18 July 2019 by Pope Francis, succeeding Greg Burke. He is the first non-journalist to hold the office.

== Biography ==
Matteo Bruni, who was born in 1976 in Winchester, England, holds a degree in foreign languages and literature from La Sapienza University in Rome.

He joined the Holy See Press Office in 2009 to manage journalist accreditations. In 2013, he became responsible for communications during papal travels.

Bruni was appointed director of the Holy See Press Office in 2019 by Pope Francis, succeeding Greg Burke. He is the first non-journalist to hold the office. Bruni announced the death of Pope Emeritus Benedict XVI on 31 December 2022.

== Personal life ==
Bruni speaks English, Italian, French and Spanish. He has been a member of the Community of Sant'Egidio, a Catholic lay association committed to social service, since he was a teenager. He is married and has a daughter.
