= Emmanuel Adetoyese Badejo =

Nigerian Catholic bishop

- Catholic Bishop of Oyo
- Diocese: Oyo
- Appointed: 14 August 2007
- Installed: 20 October 2007
- Predecessor: Julius Babatunde Adelakun

Personal details
- Born: Emmanuel Adetoyese Badejo; 13 July 1961 (age 64)
- Denomination: Roman Catholic
- Coat of arms

Emmanuel Adetoyese Badejo (born 13 July 1961) is a Nigerian Roman Catholic prelate who is serving as the Bishop of Oyo Diocese. Badejo was ordained a priest by Julius Babatunde Adelakun on 4 January 1986 and was appointed the Bishop of Oyo Diocese by Pope Benedict XVI after Adelakun's retirement on 14 August 2007.

== Early life and education ==
Badejo was born on 13 July 1961. He studied philosophy at Saints Peter and Paul Seminary, Ibadan, Oyo State. He later obtained a Bachelor of Theology degree from the Pontifical Urban University in Rome, Italy. In 1995, he obtained a Licentiate in Pastoral Communications Summa cum laude from the Salesian Pontifical University in Rome.

== Bishop of Oyo Diocese ==
Badejo became the President of the Association of Nigerian Priests and Religious in Rome from 1993 to 1994. He was appointed to work at the Department of Communication at the Catholic Secretariat of Nigeria in Lagos from 1996 to 2003. He founded the Catholic Artistes and Entertainers Association of Nigeria and was the first National Chaplain from 2005 to 2006.

On 14 August 2007, Badejo was appointed the bishop of the Diocese of Oyo. He was consecrated on 20 October 2007 and publicly assumed office on 20 November 2009 after the retirement of Julius Babatunde Adelakun.

== Diplomatic career ==
Badejo was appointed the President of the Pan African Episcopal Committee for Social Communication (CEPACS) in 2016. Pope Francis appointed him as a member of the Dicastery for Communications on 3 December 2021.
