= William R. Field =

William Richard Field S.M.A.
- Bishop of Ondo
- Church: Catholic Church
- Diocese: Diocese of Ondo
- In office: 16 January 1958 – 31 May 1976
- Predecessor: Thomas P. Hughes
- Successor: Francis Folorunsho Clement Alonge

Orders
- Ordination: 10 June 1934 by Edward Mulhern
- Consecration: 27 April 1958 by Patrick Kelly

Personal details
- Born: 6 July 1907 Schull, County Cork, United Kingdom of Great Britain and Ireland
- Died: 3 February 1988 (aged 80) Cork, County Cork, Republic of Ireland

Bishop William Richard Field, S.M.A. (6 July 1907 – 3 February 1988) was an Irish born priest who served as the Bishop of the Roman Catholic Diocese of Ondo in Nigeria. Born in Schull, Co. Cork, Ireland in 1907, he was ordained a priest in 1934, he joined the Society of African Missions, Dr Field was appointed Bishop of Ondo, in 1958, succeeding Bishop Thomas Hughes SMA. He was succeeded as Bishop of Ondo in 1976 by Bishop Francis Folorunsho Clement Alonge.

He died on 3 February 1988.
