= Missionary Sisters of Our Lady of the Apostles =

Roman Catholic religious congregation

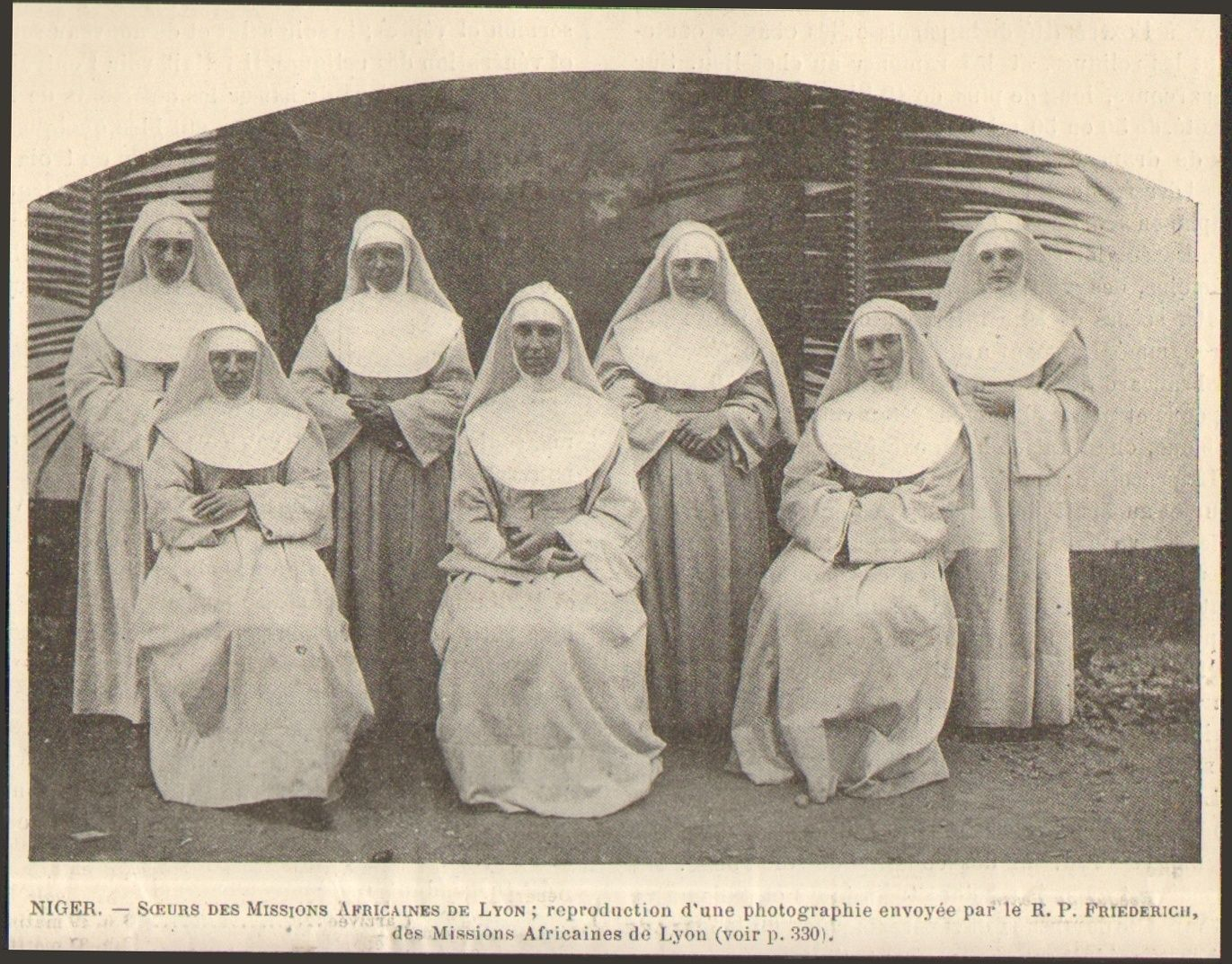
Missionary Sisters of African Missions in Niger (French West Africa) around 1920.

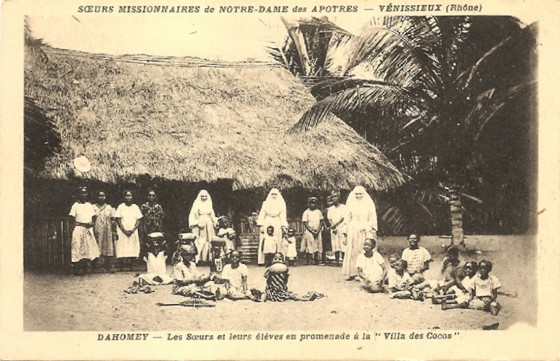
Missionary Sisters of Our Lady of the Apostles in Dahomey around 1920.

The Congregation of the Missionary Sisters of Our Lady of the Apostles is a Catholic religious congregation founded in 1876 in Lyon, France, by Fr Augustin Planque, the first superior general of the Society of African Missions. The sisters were founded to assist with the priests' missions in Africa.

== History ==
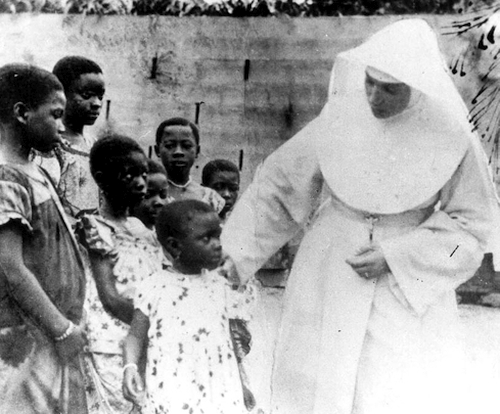
Mother Eugenia Ravasio as a Catholic missionary nun in Africa (1939).

Mother Eugenia Ravasio was Superior General from 1935 until 1947; she marked the history of the religious congregation for her work in favour of leprosy and for having received unprecedented visions and revelations from God the Father.

In 1995, Sister Angèle-Marie Littlejohn and Sister Bibiane Leclercq were killed by terrorism in Algiers. They are recognized as martyrs by the Catholic Church. Their beatification was celebrated on 8 December 2018 in Oran (Algeria) with the Martyrs of Algeria.

== Apostolate ==
The Congregation of the Missionary Sisters of Our Lady of the Apostles has currently more than 700 sisters from 21 countries in 19 countries. The sisters pronounce the three vows of poverty, chastity and obedience, for the realization of the first evangelization, the service of the poorest and the promotion of women, in an inter-religious dialogue: "we go beyond the borders of countries and of religions to boldly proclaim the dead and resurrected Christ to a multicultural world. We are a ferment of hope in a world in search of landmarks and in quest of Absolute. We are working on the first evangelization, especially in Africa. With respect, we welcome the truth of others and collaborate in the inculturation of the Gospel. We are attentive to the missionary dimension of the local Church. We live in effective solidarity with the poor, especially with women and all the persons who are marginalized in our contemporary societies".

== Bibliography ==
- (in French) Georges Goyau, Les Sœurs de Notre-Dame des Apôtres, Paris, Éditions Spes, 1936.
- (in French) Fr. André Ravier, Les Missionnaires de Notre-Dame des Apôtres, Lyon, Lescuyer, décembre 1944, 594 pages.
- (in English) Father Andrea D'Ascanio, FOR THE GLORY OF THE FATHER - A biography of Mother Eugenia Elisabetta Ravasio (1907-1990). Tip. Editrice Pisani - Isola del Liri, 94 pages.
