= Dicastery for Communication =

Department of the Holy See

- Dicasterium pro Communicatione
- Established: 29 June 2015; 11 years ago
- Founder: Pope Francis
- Merger of: All communication offices of Holy See and Vatican City
- Location: Vatican City
- Prefect: Montse Alvarado
- Director: Paolo Nusiner
- Chief editor: Andrea Tornielli
- Parent organization: Roman Curia
- Website: comunicazione.va

The Dicastery for Communication (Latin: Dicasterium pro Communicatione, Italian: Dicastero per la Comunicazione) is a department (dicastery) of the Roman Curia with authority over all communication offices of the Holy See and the Vatican City State. Its various offices can be accessed through its website. These are the Pope's website and other offices such as Vatican News on the internet (including the former Vatican Media Center that distributes segments for television), the Holy See Press Office, L'Osservatore Romano newspaper, the Photograph Service, Vatican Radio, Vatican Press, and the Vatican Publishing House. The Pontifical Council for Social Communications has been subsumed into this new dicastery.

== History ==
Pope Francis established the Secretariat for Communication in June 2015, with Monsignor Dario Edoardo Viganò, former director of the Vatican Television Center, as its first prefect. Viganò resigned on 21 March 2018, "a week after his mishandling of a letter from retired Pope Benedict XVI provoked a global outcry".

On 23 June 2018, the secretariat was renamed as the Dicastery for Communication, and on 5 July 2018, Pope Francis appointed award-winning lay journalist Paolo Ruffini as prefect. He was the first layman named to head a Vatican dicastery. Ruffini also chairs the Commission for Information of the Sixteenth Ordinary General Assembly of the Synod of Bishops.

Monsignor Lucio Adrian Ruiz, former head of the Vatican Internet Service, is Secretary of the Dicastery and Paul Nusiner, former General Manager of Avvenire, is Director General.

Nataša Govekar is the Director of the Theological-Pastoral Department.

On 2 June 2026, Pope Leo XIV appointed Montse Alvarado, President and COO of EWTN News, as Prefect effective 1 November 2026. This made her the first woman to be the head of this Dicastery, and the first lay woman appointed Prefect of any dicastery of the Holy See.

== Members ==
On 13 July 2016, Pope Francis appointed the following as members of the Secretariat for Communication:

- Patriarch Moran Mor Béchara Boutros Raï
- Cardinal John Njue
- Cardinal Chibly Langlois
- Cardinal Charles Maung Bo
- Cardinal Leonardo Sandri
- Cardinal Beniamino Stella
- Archbishop Diarmuid Martin
- Archbishop Gintaras Grušas
- Bishop Marcello Semeraro
- Bishop Stanislas Lalanne
- Bishop Pierre Nguyễn Văn Khảm
- Bishop Ginés Ramón García Beltrán
- Bishop Nuno Brás da Silva Martins
- Alessandro Elia
- Kim Daniels
- Markus Schächter
- Leticia Soberón Mainero

On 12 April 2017, Pope Francis expanded the Secretariat for Communication and appointed 13 new consultants:

- Jacquineau Azétsop, S.J.
- Fernando Giménez Barriocanal
- Ann Carter
- Dino Cataldo Dell'Accio
- Graham Ellis
- Peter Gonsalves S.D.B.
- José María La Porte
- Ivan Maffeis
- James Martin, S.J.
- Paolo Peverini
- Eric Salobir, O.P.
- Michael Paul Unland
- Michael Warsaw

On 18 December 2018, Pope Francis appointed Andrea Tornielli as Editorial Director, and on 3 December 2021, he appointed Bishop Emmanuel Adetoyese Badejo as a member of the Dicastery.

== See also ==
- Index of Vatican City-related articles
