= International religious television broadcasters =

International religious television broadcasters broadcast from a host nation to another nation or nations. Such operations are mostly operated from the United States of America, Portugal and Italy, in conjunction with a religious organization having links to many churches or shrines who produce their own programs. The following is a list of such broadcasters with links to entries about each one:

- Angelus TV – a Catholic television network based near the Sanctuary of Our Lady of Fatima in Cova da Iria, Fatima, Portugal.
- CatholicTV – a Catholic television network based in Watertown, Massachusetts, United States of America.
- Eternal Word Television Network (EWTN) – major worldwide Catholic radio and television broadcaster based in Alabama, United States of America; largest religious television network in the world.
- KTO (TV channel) – French-speaking Catholic television network broadcasting France, Belgium, Switzerland; based Malakoff near Paris.
- Redevida – Brazilian Catholic television network headquartered in São José do Rio Preto, São Paulo.
- Salt + Light Television – Canada's Catholic television network, available on satellite.
- Telepace – a Catholic television network based in Cerna, province of Verona, Italy, which includes some programming from Vatican Media.
- Trinity Broadcasting Network – broadcasting from studios in California and Texas, United States of America, and transmitting by a network of terrestrial transmitters in various countries linked by the use of global satellite services.
- Three Angels Broadcasting Network – a radio and television station based in Illinois, United States of America.
- Universal Living Faith Network – a television network owned by the Brazilian Christian denomination Universal Church of the Kingdom of God based in Texas, United States of America serving nationwide.
- Padre Pio TV – a Catholic television network based near the Sanctuary of Saint Pio of Pietrelcina in San Giovanni Rotondo, Italy.
- Shalom World – a 24/7 Commercial-Free, Catholic, Family Entertainment Channel.

== See also ==
- Catholic television
- Catholic television channels
- Catholic television networks
- International radio broadcasters
- International religious radio broadcasters
- International television broadcasters
