= KNXT =

KNXT may refer to:

- KNXT-LD, a television station (channel 53) licensed to Bakersfield, California
- KNXT, the call sign of KCBS-TV (channel 2) in Los Angeles, California, from 1951 to 1984
- KNXT, the call sign of KIFR (TV) (channel 49) in Visalia (Fresno), California, from 1986 to 2021
