= Federico Lombardi =

Italian Catholic priest

The Reverend Federico Lombardi S.J.
- Director Emeritus of the Holy See Press Office
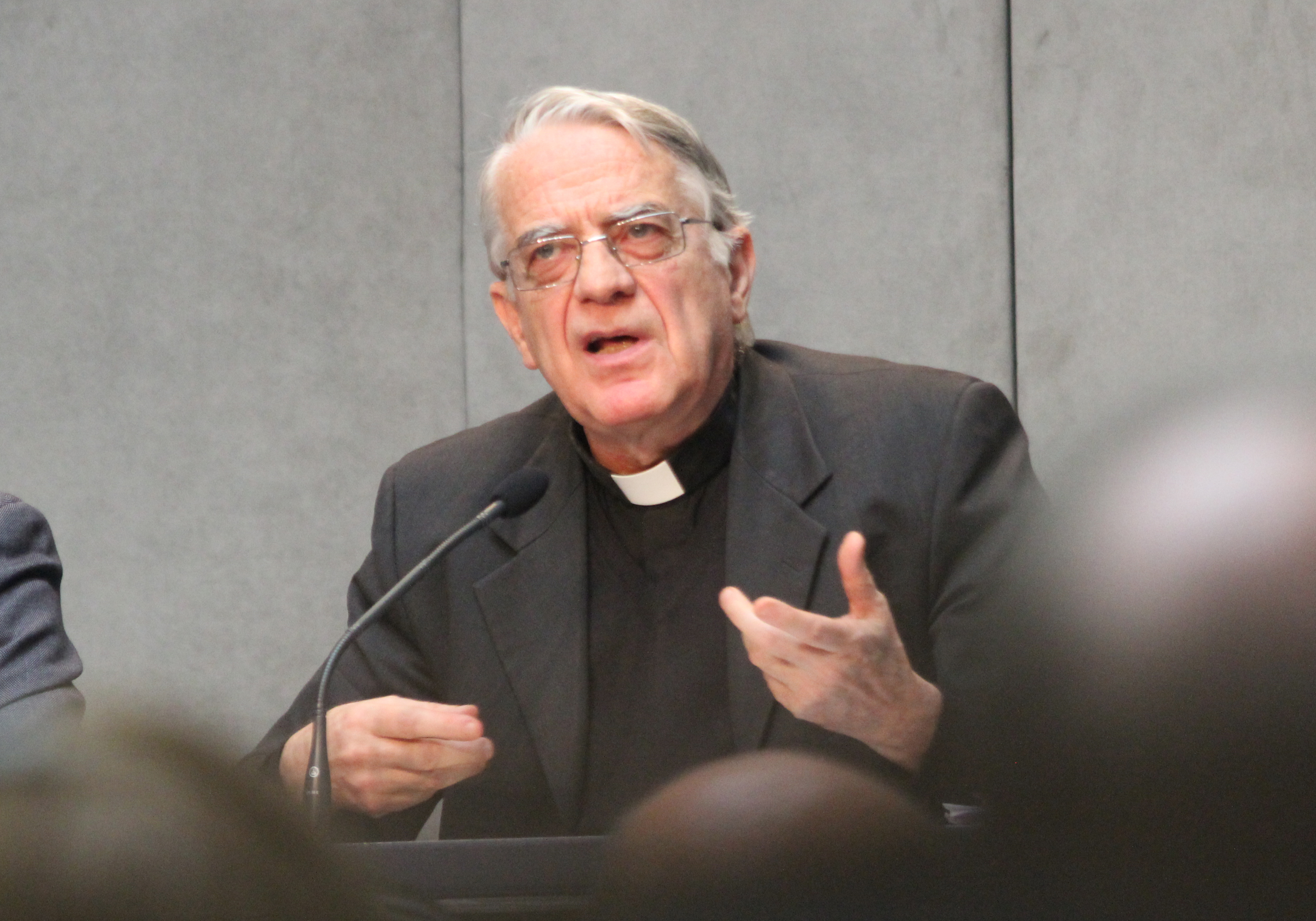
- Church: Roman Catholic Church
- Appointed: 11 July 2006
- Term ended: 1 August 2016
- Predecessor: Dr. Joaquín Navarro-Valls
- Successor: Greg Burke
- Previous posts: Program Director of Vatican Radio (1991-2005); General Director of the Vatican Television Centre (2001-2013)

Orders
- Ordination: 2 September 1972

Personal details
- Born: Federico Lombardi; 29 August 1942 (age 84) Saluzzo, Piedmont, Italy
- Denomination: Catholic Church

Ordination history
History
Priestly ordination
- Date: 1972

Federico Lombardi SJ (born 29 August 1942) is an Italian Catholic priest and the former director of the Holy See Press Office. He succeeded Joaquín Navarro-Valls and was succeeded by Greg Burke.

Lombardi also serves as the postulator for the sainthood cause of Fr. Bernardo Mattio.

== Early life and ordination ==
Lombardi was born on 29 August 1942 in Saluzzo, Piedmont, Italy, and was trained in mathematics and studied theology in Germany. He became a Jesuit priest in 1972, and then worked for the influential Jesuit-run magazine, La Civiltà Cattolica, and served as superior of the Jesuits' Italian province.

== Vatican Radio ==
Lombardi was named program director (1991) and later director general (2005) of Vatican Radio. He was also made general director of the Vatican Television Centre in 2001; a position he held until 2013 and in which Dario Edoardo Viganò succeeded him.

== Press Office of the Holy See ==
On 11 July 2006 Pope Benedict XVI appointed him director of the Vatican Press Office, replacing Joaquín Navarro-Valls, a layman who had held the post for 22 years. Lombardi's appointment to the Press Office of the Holy See merged with it the leadership of Vatican Radio and Vatican Television Center as well, as he continued to hold those directorships.

Upon assuming the directorate, Lombardi said he would not be a papal "spokesman" since he believes Benedict XVI did not need an interpreter, saying, "I don't think my role is to explain the Pope's thinking or explain the things that he already states in an extraordinarily clear and rich way." He is considered to have taken a more low-key approach than his predecessor.

== Crises in communication ==
In an editorial for "Octava Dies", a weekly program of the Vatican Television Center, he criticized statements made by Bishop Richard Williamson denying the extent of the Holocaust. Lombardi was later criticized himself by Cardinal Dario Castrillon Hoyos over the problems in communication revealed during the affair.

Lombardi said that the Pope had never been a member of the Hitler Youth, but journalists quickly pointed out to him that Cardinal Ratzinger, later Pope, had admitted this himself in the 1997 book Salt of the Earth.

In 2009 Lombardi said that in "cases like Pope Benedict XVI's Regensburg discourse, the Bishop Williamson affair, or the controversy over Pope Benedict XVI's statements regarding condoms and the spread of HIV and AIDS in Africa, ... once the first wave of criticism had passed, people were able to do some real hard thinking; ... subsequent reflections were serious, penetrating and well-argued."

In September 2012, Lombardi released a second statement on the 2012 diplomatic missions attacks which clearly condemned mob violence; his first statement had been criticized by Catholic bloggers for omitting to condemn the violence, and for emphasizing primarily the religious feelings of offended Muslims.

== Other ==
In addition to his native Italian, Lombardi speaks French, German, and English, as well as reading and understanding Spanish and Portuguese.

At the end of October 2011, he addressed his weekly editorial as a letter of welcome to the 7 billionth baby born on Earth.

== Succession ==
His resignation as Director of the Holy See Press Office, which had been expected for reasons of age, was accepted by Pope Francis on 11 July 2016; he continued in his role until 31 July 2016. Father Lombardi was succeeded as Director of the Press Office on 1 August 2016 by the then-Deputy Director, Mr. Greg Burke, an American from Saint Louis, Missouri, who had held the Deputy Director's post since 2015, having worked beforehand in the Secretariat of State of the Holy See in the General Affairs Section, as Assessor for Communications. Burke was succeeded as Deputy Director by Paloma García Ovejero, a woman and a native of Madrid, Spain, who has been serving as a correspondent for Italy and the Vatican, and earlier as an editor and presenter for Cadena Cope, Radio Española. Both Burke and Ovejero resigned their positions on 31 December 2018, upon which Pope Francis appointed Alessandro Gisotti as provisional director.

== See also ==
- News.va
- Vatican Information Service
