= Vatican Radio =

Radio service of Vatican City

- Vatican City; Vatican City

Programming
- Format: News, religious celebrations, in-depth programs, and music
- Affiliations: World Radio Network

Ownership
- Owner: Dicastery for Communication of the Roman Curia

History
- First air date: 12 February 1931; 95 years ago

Technical information
- Transmitter coordinates: 41°54′14″N 12°27′01″E

Links
- Website: vaticannews.va/radio

Vatican Radio (Italian: Radio Vaticana; Latin: Statio Radiophonica Vaticana) is the official broadcasting service of Vatican City.

Established in 1931 by Guglielmo Marconi, today its programs are offered in 47 languages, and are sent out on short wave, DRM, medium wave, FM, satellite and the Internet. Since its inception, Vatican Radio has been maintained by the Jesuit Order. Vatican Radio preserved its independence during the rise of Fascist Italy and Nazi Germany.

Today, programming is produced by over 200 journalists located in 61 countries. Vatican Radio produces more than 42,000 hours of simultaneous broadcasting covering international news, religious celebrations, in-depth programs, and music. The current general director is Father Federico Lombardi, S.J.

On 27 June 2015, Pope Francis, in a motu proprio apostolic letter, established the Secretariat for Communications in the Roman Curia, which absorbed Vatican Radio effective 1 January 2017, ending the organization's 85 years of independent operation.

== History ==
=== 1930s ===
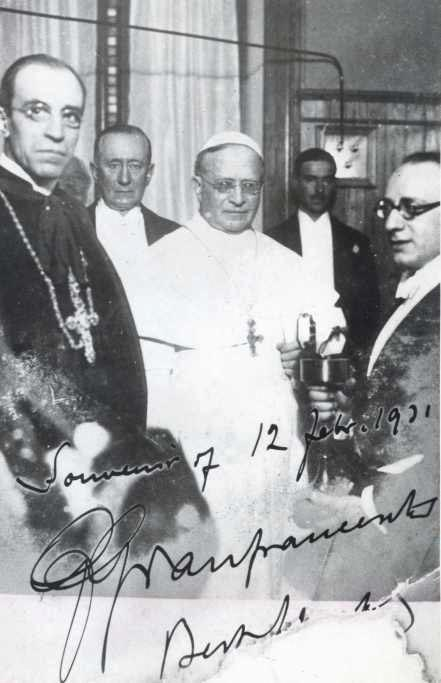
Pope Pius XI, his successor Cardinal Pacelli with Guglielmo Marconi at the starting of Vatican Radio in 1931

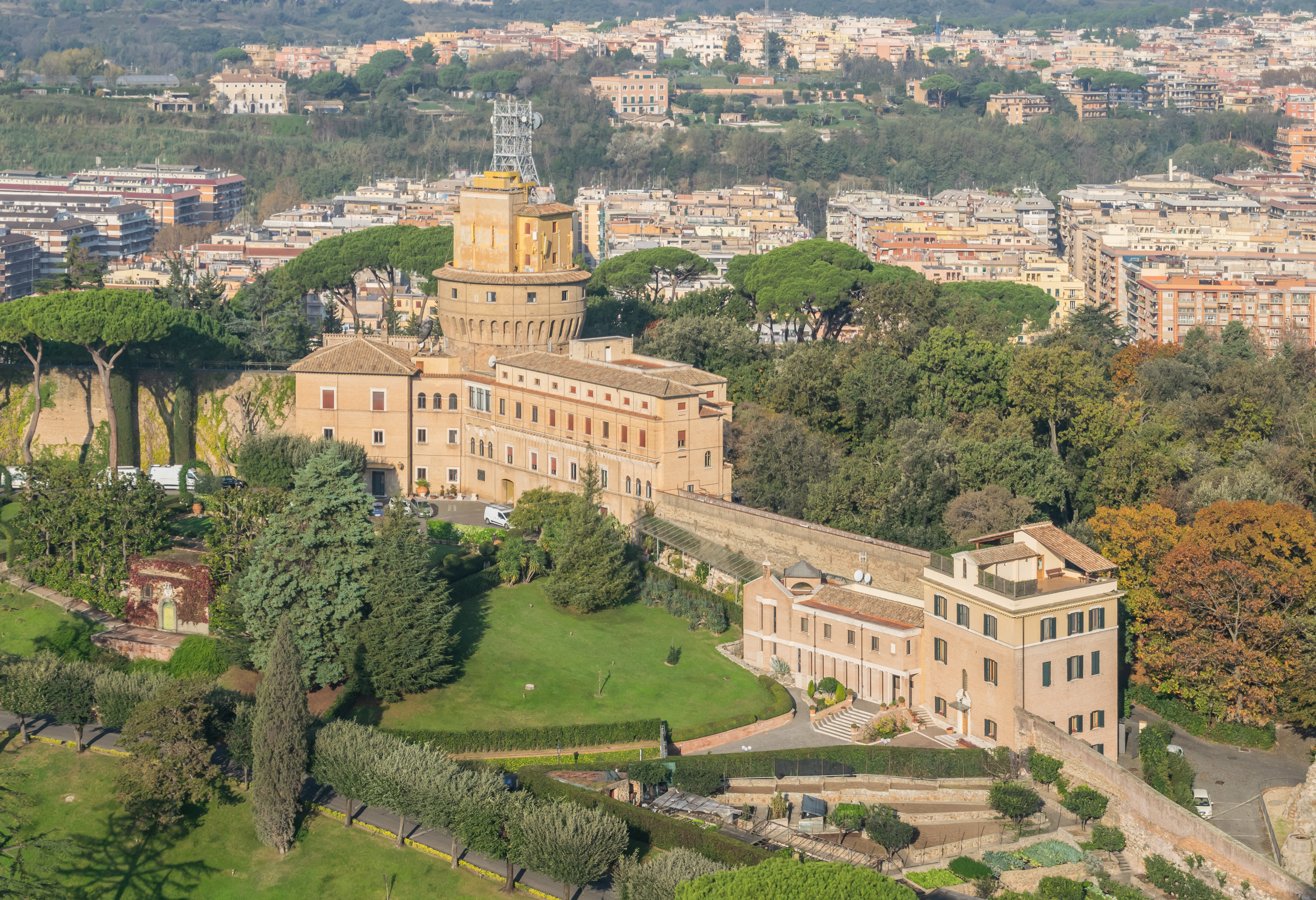
The Palazzina di Leone XIII, Vatican Radio's administration building in Vatican City, with its radio masts.

Vatican Radio began broadcasting with the callsign HVJ on two shortwave frequencies using 10 kilowatts (kW) of power on 12 February 1931, with the pontificial message "Omni creaturae" of Pope Pius XI. Also in attendance was Guglielmo Marconi and Cardinal Eugenio Pacelli, who would become Pope Pius XII. Its first director was physicist Giuseppe Gianfranceschi, who was also the president of the Accademia dei Nuovi Lincei.

In 1933, a permanent microwave link was established between the Vatican Palace and the summer residence of the papacy, Castel Gandolfo.

In 1936, the International Telecommunication Union (ITU) recognized Vatican Radio as a "special case" and authorized its broadcasting without any geographical limits. On 25 December 1937 a Telefunken 25 kW transmitter and two directional antennas were added. Vatican Radio broadcast over 10 frequencies.

=== World War II ===
Following a December 1939 report from Cardinal August Hlond of Poznań detailing the oppression of the Catholic Church in Poland, Pope Pius XII decided, among other measures, to use Vatican Radio to provide "information regarding the condition of the church in Poland." The German broadcast on 21 January 1940 compared German activities to "what the Communists imposed on Spain in 1936"; the English service noted the attacks on the Church were not limited to the Soviets.

During World War II, Vatican Radio's news broadcasts were (like all foreign broadcasts) banned in Germany. During the war, the radio service operated in four languages.

While some critics have said Pope Pius XII was too quiet regarding the Holocaust, Jacques Adler examined the transcripts of wartime broadcasts over the Vatican Radio. Adler argues that it exposed Nazi persecution of the Church and opposed collaboration with Nazism. It appealed to Catholics to remain true to their faith's injunctions: to defend the sanctity of life and the unity of humankind. In so doing the Pope pursued a policy of spiritual resistance to Nazi ideology and racism.

=== 1940s and 1950s ===
In 1948, services expanded to 18 languages.

Due to space constraints, the Holy See acquired a 400-hectare (1½ sq. mi.) area located 18 kilometres (11 miles) north of Rome at Santa Maria di Galeria (GC: 42°2′39″N 12°19′22″E). The Italian Republic granted the site extraterritorial status in 1952.

In 1957, a new broadcasting center was placed in operation, with a Philips 100 kW shortwave transmitter, two 10 kW shortwave transmitters, and one 120 kW mediumwave transmitter, with 21 directional and one omnidirectional antenna. The next phase involved two 100 kW transmitters aimed at Africa and Oceania, a 250 kW mediumwave transmitter for Europe, and a 500 kW transmitter for the Far East and Latin America.

Radio Vaticana was one of 23 founding broadcasting organisations of the European Broadcasting Union in 1950.

=== 2000s ===
In the 21st century, Vatican Radio has experimented with digital transmission technologies (DRM, T-DAB, T-DMB) and has used electronic newsletters, podcasts, and other new technologies to distribute its programming. Vatican Radio and CTV began their own YouTube channel in 2010, operating in four languages, and operates six Twitter accounts.

In May 2009 it was announced that Vatican Radio would begin broadcasting commercial advertisements for the first time in July. The decision was made to meet the radio's rising costs, namely 21.4m euros a year. All advertisements would have to meet "high moral standards". Vatican Radio stopped transmitting short- and medium-wave broadcasts to North America, South America, and Europe on Sunday 1 July 2012. The Vatican Press Office closed Vatican Information Service in August 2012.

In 2014 Michael Gannon, from Ireland, became the first person with Down Syndrome to work at any Vatican office, which he did as an intern at Vatican Radio.

As of 2016, Vatican Radio had a staff of 355 people who produce more than 66 hours of daily programming in 45 languages on air, and 38 languages on the website. Programs are broadcast via short wave, FM and satellite.

Vatican Radio has been losing between €20 and €30 million annually. With its absorption into the Curia's Secretariat for Communications on 1 January 2017 Vatican Radio director Msgr. Dario Viganò has indicated that he plans to pare down short-wave radio operations and institute cost control measures in the service's other broadcast operations.

On 24 March 2017, Vatican Radio made its final English-language shortwave transmission to Asia after 59 years of service. Vatican Radio's English Service for Asia has then continued online.

== Television and satellite ==
During the 1930s, the station made experimental television broadcasts. Apart from a brief experimental revival in the 1950s (callsign HVJ, started 1953. Channel 8 on the French standard for VHF, had plans to switch to the standard used in the rest of Europe), it was not until the 1990s that a regular 'satellite' television service began. The programs of TV2000 include programming from Vatican Television Center.

Vatican Channel HD is available in English and Italian on the satellite through Eutelsat Hot Bird 13°est (11334 MHz, pol.H, Sr 27500,3/4) as well as on terrestrial TV in the Rome metropolitan area, and Vatican Media Europe multilanguage on Hot Bird 13B (12475 MHz, pol.H, Sr 29900, 3/4).

Vatican Radio Europe is available via satellite through Eutelsat Hot Bird 13°est (12476 MHz, pol.H, Sr 29900, 3/4) and Radio Vaticana 5, in Italian Eutelsat 9B (12466 MHz, pol.V, Sr 41950, 3/4).

== Transmitters ==
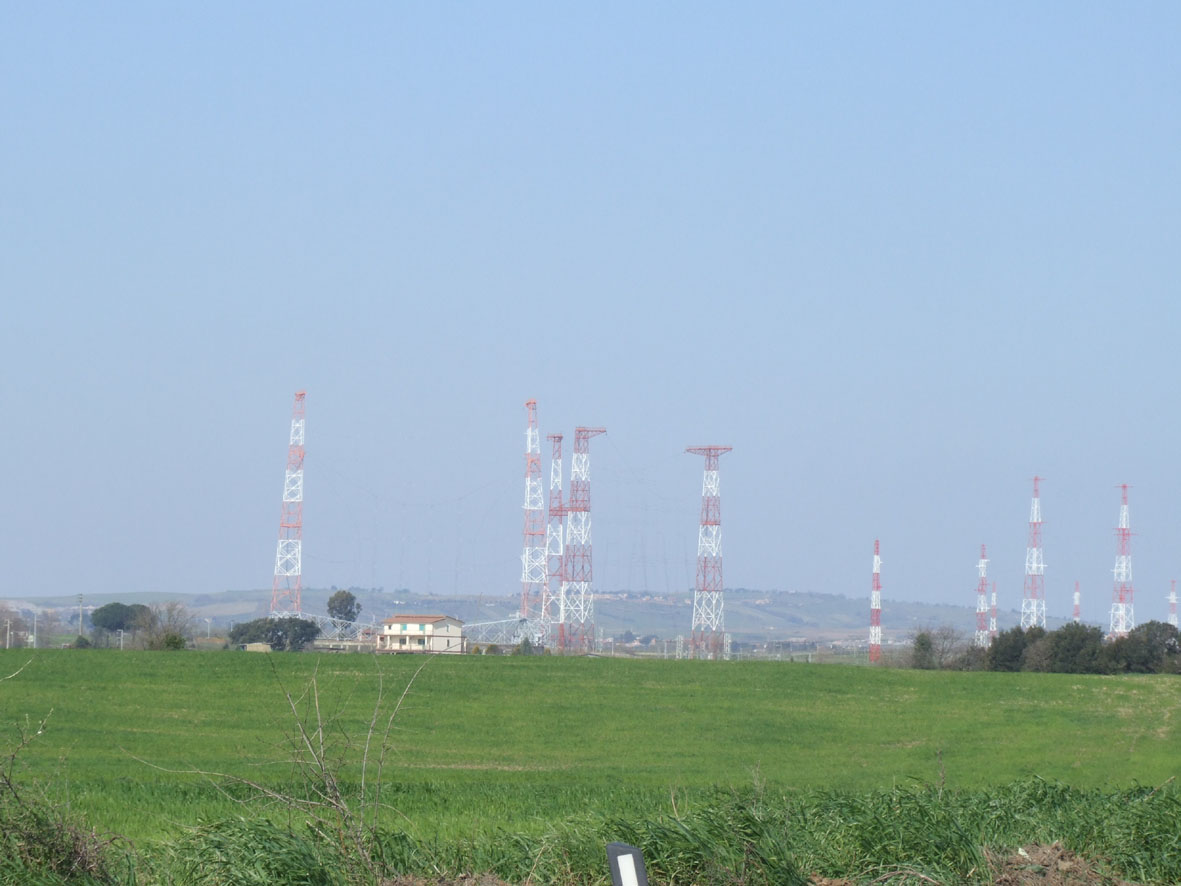
Transmitter array at the Vatican Radio transmitter site, Santa Maria di Galeria

The signals are transmitted from a large shortwave and medium-wave transmission facility for Radio Vatican. The Santa Maria di Galeria Transmitter was established in 1957 and it is an extraterritorial area in Italy belonging to the Holy See. Vatican Radio's interval signal, Christus Vincit, is a well-known sound on shortwave radio.

One aerial for the medium wave frequency 1530 kHz which consists of four 94-metre-high (308 ft) grounded freestanding towers arranged in a square, which carry wires for a medium wave aerial on horizontal crossbars. The direction of this aerial can be changed.

From May 2014 to December 2016 the antennas of Santa Maria di Galeria were progressively decommissioned, which radiated the medium wave signal on 1530 kHz with programs destined for Italy, Europe and the Mediterranean area.

== Radiation controversy ==
The Santa Maria di Galeria transmitter site is the subject of a dispute between the station and some local residents who claim the non-ionising radiation from the site has affected their health.

== See also ==
- Index of Vatican City-related articles
- International religious radio broadcasters
- L'Osservatore Romano
- Vatican Media
- Vatican News
- Vatican Radio website DDoS attack from Anonymous on March 12, 2012
- The World Family of Radio Maria
- List of Jesuit sites
- Vatican Radio's Belarusian Service
