= Angelus TV =

- Country: Portugal
- Headquarters: Rua da Tapada, nr. 118, 2495–405 Fátima, Portugal

History
- Launched: 2 May 2017
- Closed: 31 May 2019

Links
- Website: www.AngelusTV.pt

Angelus TV was a Portuguese Catholic television channel founded in 2017 in the city of Fátima, Portugal. The headquarters of this TV station were near the Sanctuary of Our Lady of Fatima in the Cova da Iria, from which transmitted multiple daily celebrations.

It was distributed on cable television systems in Portugal and via internet television worldwide.

== History ==
Angelus TV was first announced in January 2017 with a tentative launch scheduled for the second half of February, without revealing the exact date. The channel employed a permanent staff of 20, including a Brazilian member who had previously worked for Canção Nova, and has been living in Fátima since 2005.

The channel was plagued by financial difficulties especially since 2018. A failed campaign to save the channel prompted Angelus TV to broadcast in black and white for a day, while there were concerns that the channel would leave NOS and MEO, restricting its linear coverage to Vodafone. The channel was scheduled to close on 15 April 2018 but was saved by means of a campaign initiated on 26 March that year, with the target being hit on 13 April, but even after the appointed date, the financial support wasn't sufficient. Although the channel was financed by advertising, there were obstacles due to its Catholic orientation.

Due to the lack of financial support, the channel ceased broadcasting from 31 May 2019.

== Religious services and devotional programs ==
A partial listing of CatholicTV programs:

- Candles procession from the Sanctuary of Fátima
- The Angelus from the St. Peter's Square in Vatican City
- Holy Mass from the Basilica of Our Lady of the Rosary
- Rosary from the Chapel of the Apparitions of Our Lady of Fátima

== Patron saints ==
Our Lady of Fátima was the patroness of Angelus TV. The shepherd visionaries of Our Lady, Jacinta and Francisco Marto were also considered as patron saints of this Portuguese Catholic channel.

== See also ==
- Catholic television
- Catholic television channels
- Catholic television networks
- International religious television broadcasters
- Roman Catholic Diocese of Leiria–Fátima
- Telepace
- Vatican Media
