= Catholic Faith Network =

- Country: United States
- Broadcast area: New York, New Jersey, Connecticut
- Network: Catholic Faith Network
- Headquarters: Uniondale, New York

Programming
- Language: English
- Picture format: 1080i (HDTV); 480i (SDTV)

Ownership
- Owner: Roman Catholic Diocese of Rockville Centre

History
- Launched: 1969; 57 years ago
- Former names: TeLIcare (1969–1996); Telecare (1996–2018)

Links
- Webcast: https://www.catholicfaithnetwork.org/cfn-livestream-player
- Website: https://www.catholicfaithnetwork.org/

Catholic Faith Network (CFN), formerly Telecare, is an American television channel available to Optimum, Verizon Fios, and Spectrum subscribers in New York, New Jersey, and Connecticut. Founded in 1969 by Monsignor Thomas Hartman of the Roman Catholic Diocese of Rockville Centre in New York. CFN broadcasts programming aimed at to Catholic viewers, including live religious services, talk shows, devotional programs, educational programming, entertainment, and children's programs. It also presents coverage of special events at the Vatican and of papal journeys.

The Catholic Faith Network (CFN) is available on Optimum channel 29/137, Verizon Fios TV channel 296, and Charter Spectrum channel 162/471 throughout the New York, New Jersey, and Connecticut area.

The Catholic Faith Network (CFN) is also available on select cable and satellite systems nationwide, along with an on-demand library of original programming and a 24/7 live stream.

Telecare was rebranded as Catholic Faith Network on September 7, 2018.

== Leadership ==
Msgr. James C. Vlaun is currently President and CEO of Catholic Faith Network (CFN).

== Program titles ==
A partial listing of CFN's programs:

- Daily Mass from St. Agnes Cathedral (Rockville Centre, New York) (Long Island, New York) (in English and Spanish)
- Daily Mass from St. Patrick's Cathedral (New York City)
- Daily Mass Celebrated by Pope Francis from the Santa Marta Chapel in Rome (on demand)
- Catholic Perspectives with Bishop William Murphy
- Celebrating the Saints
- CFN Live
- CFN News
- CFN Special Presentation
- Chaplet of Divine Mercy
- Catholic Health: Dr. O: Faithfully Transforming Health Care
- Catholic Health: Lifestyles at the Heart of Health
- Conversation with Cardinal Dolan
- Encounter - with Bishop John Barres
- Family Comes First - Hosted by Vincent J. Russo and Victoria Roberts Drogin. Real families facing real issues with grace, hope, and determination
- In His Image
- Living Word
- Live from the Sheen Center
- Molloy: Public Square 2.0
- Papal Audience from Rome
- Real Food, hosted by Monsignor Jim Vlaun, highlights the importance of faith, gathering with family, and the spiritual nature of sharing a meal, bringing faith into the kitchen
- Seven Last Words of Christ
- Stations of the Cross
- St. Joseph's College: Living Our Mission
- St. Joseph's Seminary
- Tomorrow's Hope
- Walking with Mary
- The Word
- The Rosary (in English and Spanish)

== Religion and Rock ==
Religion and Rock is a weekly 60-minute classic rock radio program with Monsignor Jim Vlaun, broadcast locally on Sunday morning, and on Sirius/XM on Saturday and Sunday evenings. The podcasts are available free on the website and on iTunes. (Not to be confused with Rock & Religion Radio Show.)

== Studios ==
The Catholic Faith Network's studio facilities are located in Uniondale, New York on the campus of Kellenberg Memorial High School and in Manhattan.

== See also ==
- Catholic television
- Catholic television channels
- Catholic television networks
- The God Squad (Telecare), former program
- CatholicTV, Massachusetts
- Padre Pio TV, Italy
