= Canal Orbe 21 =

Catholic TV station in Buenos Aires, Argentina

LRL 456 TV
- Buenos Aires; Argentina
- Channels: Digital: 21.2 (ISDB-T)
- Branding: Canal Orbe 21

Ownership
- Owner: Catholic Church in Argentina; (Iglesia Católica Apostólica Argentina)

History
- First air date: 2006

Technical information
- Licensing authority: Ente Nacional de Comunicaciones

Links
- Website: canalorbe21.com

Canal Orbe 21 (call sign LRL 456 TV) is a television station on channel 21.2 in Buenos Aires, Argentina. It is the television station Catholic of the Archdiocese of Buenos Aires.

== History ==
The Federal Broadcasting Committee (COMFER) authorized the award of a television station, originally on channel 66, in 2000 to the Franciscan order; the concession was modified to specify channel 21 in 2001. Previously, other archdioceses had received radio and television concessions after COMFER was empowered to award them to the church in 1990. Construction and operation of the station, however, was left to the Archdiocese of Buenos Aires pursuant to a 2004 agreement; the archdiocese had maintained a television production center since 1986. The archdiocese launched the station on a test basis in January 2006 from a transmitter located at the Inmaculada Concepción Seminary in Villa Devoto and studios located on the 10th floor of an archdiocesan building at Rivadavia 413. Full service began in July 2007.

In 2013, the Vatican Television Center reached a deal with Canal 21 to allow it access to the large archive of material it had pertaining to Cardinal Jorge Bergoglio, who was elected as Pope Francis earlier that year. It adopted its present name of Orbe 21 on December 12, 2014, and was added to the Movistar+ service in multiple Spanish-speaking countries, including Spain. The addition to the Movistar+ service came after the pope had a conversation with Telefónica president César Alierta.

Commercial network Telefe has provided significant support for Canal Orbe 21's operations. When Canal 21 moved into the former Argentina Sono Film studios, Telefe began paying its rent; additionally, Canal Orbe 21 was initially slated to share space with Telefe on its digital television multiplex. Ultimately, Canal Orbe TV was assigned 21.2, transmitting in 720p resolution at 6.5 Mbit/s on the channel 21 multiplex shared with Editorial Perfil channel Alfa TV.

== Programming ==
When then-Cardinal Bergoglio gave instructions to Julio Rimoldi, the first director general of Canal 21, he said the station should be positioned "between nude women and the Sunday Mass, in the middle", and Aleteia has described it as lacking "the odor of the sacristy". The channel airs a diversified schedule of programming, including public affairs, entertainment, and children's shows. It also airs Catholic masses, events of the pope, and extensive coverage of apostolic visits and important liturgical conferences. Two thirds of its output is produced in-house.

One of Bergoglio's programs prior to becoming pope—Biblia, diálogo vigente (Bible, Living Dialogue), which he co-hosted with a rabbi and a Protestant priest—was presented with an honorary Martín Fierro Award in 2013.

== Local repeaters ==
In 2015, the Federal Authority for Audiovisual Communication Services awarded the Catholic Church twelve new TV stations, which will rebroadcast Orbe 21 programming with local insertions for those dioceses that can financially sustain it.

== See also ==
- 2006 in television
- Television in Argentina
- Catholic television
- Catholic television channels
- Catholic television networks
