= Catholic television =

Catholic Church television networks and programs

Catholic television refers to television networks and programs based on the teachings of the Catholic Church. The Second Vatican Council's Decree on the Media of Social Communications (1963) sought to promote, "where it may be necessary", the establishment of Catholic radio and television stations.

== Networks ==
=== Argentina ===
- Canal Orbe 21, HQ: Buenos Aires

=== Brazil ===
- Canção Nova, HQ: Cachoeira Paulista, SP
- Rede Vida, HQ: São José do Rio Preto, SP; Launched in 1995
- TV Aparecida, HQ: Aparecida, SP; Launched in 2005

=== Canada ===
- Salt + Light Television, HQ: Toronto

=== Chile ===
- TV+ (Chile), HQ: Santiago

=== Colombia ===
- Cristovisión, HQ: Bogotá

=== Congo, Democratic Republic of ===
- Zénith Radio-Télévision, HQ: Lubumbashi

=== Croatia ===
- Laudato TV (Laudato Televizija), HQ: Zagreb

=== France ===
- KTO (TV channel), HQ: Malakoff, near Paris. Broadcasts in France, Belgium, and Switzerland

=== Germany ===
- EWTN Deutschland - Katholisches TV, HQ: Kőln
- K-TV Katholisches Fernsehen, HQ: Wangen im Allgäu. A religious broadcasting network in Germany

=== India ===
- Divyavani TV, HQ: Hyderabad, Telangana
- Goodness (TV channel), HQ: Kochi, Kerala
- Madha TV, HQ: Chennai, Tamil Nadu
- Shalom (TV channel), HQ: Thiruvananthapuram, Kerala
- Shekinah TV, HQ: Thalikode, Kerala

=== Italy/Vatican ===
- Padre Pio TV, HQ: San Giovanni Rotondo
- Telepace, HQ: Cerna
- TV2000, HQ: Roma
- Vatican Media, HQ: Roma

=== Lebanon ===
- Télé Lumière, HQ: Beirut

=== Malawi ===
- Luntha TV, HQ: Lilongwe

=== Mexico ===
- María Visión, HQ: Zapopan

=== Netherlands ===
- KRO-NCRV, HQ: Hilversum

=== Nigeria ===
- Catholic Television of Nigeria, HQ: Abuja
- Lumen Christi TV, HQ: Lagos. See television network in Nigeria

=== Pakistan ===
- Catholic TV (Pakistan), former Pakistani television channel

=== Panama ===
- FETV (Panama), HQ: Panama City

=== Peru ===
- JN19 TV, HQ: San Miguel District, Lima

=== Philippines ===
- Cebu Catholic Television Network, HQ: Cebu
- TV Maria, HQ: Manila

=== Poland ===
- Telewizja Trwam, HQ: Toruń

=== Portugal ===
- Angelus TV, HQ: Fátima

=== Puerto Rico ===
- WORO-DT Canal 13 (Teleoro), HQ: San Juan

=== South Korea ===
- CPBC (Catholic Peace Broadcasting Corporation), HQ: Seoul. See Andrew Yeom Soo-jung

=== Spain ===
- Cadena COPE Television, HQ: Madrid
- Trece, HQ: Madrid

=== Sri Lanka ===
- Verbum TV, HQ: Ragama

=== Uganda ===
- Uganda Catholic Television (UCTV), HQ: Nsambya

=== United States ===
- Catholic Faith Network, HQ: Uniondale, New York
- CatholicTV, HQ: Watertown, Massachusetts
- Eternal Word Television Network, HQ: Irondale, Alabama. The world's largest religious media network.
- KIFR, US, HQ: Fresno, California
- New Evangelization Television, HQ: Brooklyn, New York
- Shalom World, HQ: Edinburg, Texas

=== Venezuela ===
- Niños Cantores Televisión, HQ: Zulia
- Vale TV, HQ: Caracas

=== Zambia ===
- Lumen TV Zambia, HQ: Lusaka

== See also ==
- International religious television broadcasters
- SIGNIS (World Catholic Association for Communication)
