= My 53 =

My 53 may refer to one of the following television stations in the United States:

- KNXT-LD, MyNetworkTV affiliate in Bakersfield, California
- KMSG-LD, MyNetworkTV affiliate in Fresno, California
