= Carlos Schmitt =

Carlos Stanislau Schmitt, O.F.M. (January 27, 1919 – January 16, 2006) was a Brazilian Catholic prelate of the Order of Friars Minor. He served as Bishop of Dourados from 1960 to 1970 and later as Auxiliary Bishop of Lages from 1970 to 1973.

Born in Gaspar, Santa Catarina, Schmitt entered the seminary in 1931 and completed part of his education at Kolleg St. Ludwig in Vlodrop, Netherlands. He was admitted to the Franciscan novitiate in Rodeio in 1938, professed temporary vows in 1939, and solemn vows in 1942. He was ordained a priest in 1943 following studies in philosophy and theology in Rodeio, Curitiba, and Petrópolis. Early in his ministry, he was engaged in seminary education and popular missions, with pastoral assignments in the Baixada Fluminense and later in Xaxim.

On August 29, 1960, he was appointed Bishop of Dourados by Pope John XXIII and was consecrated in Rome on October 28, 1960. After resigning from the diocese in 1970, he was appointed auxiliary bishop of Lages and titular bishop of Sufar. He resigned from the titular diocese in 1971 but held the position of auxiliary until 1973. From 1975 until his death in 2006, he served as a hospital chaplain in Blumenau.
