= Steve Della Casa =

Italian film critic and festival curator (born 1953)

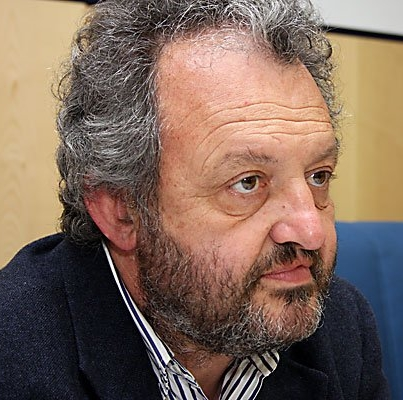
- Della Casa in 2008
- Born: 25 May 1953 (age 72); Turin, Italy
- Occupation: Film critic

Stefano "Steve" Della Casa (born 25 May 1953) is an Italian film critic, documentarist, essayist and festival curator.

== Life and career ==
Born in Turin, Della Casa graduated in cinema history under Gianni Rondolino. In 1974, he co-founded Turin's Movie Club, a major Italian film society, and in 1982, he co-founded the Festival Cinema Giovani, later known as Turin Film Festival. He directed the festival from 1998 to 2002. After serving as president of the Film Commission Torino Piemonte, he was appointed artistic director of the Rome Film Festival, a position he held from 2007 to 2013. In 2022, Della Casa was appointed president of the Turin Festival for the second time, a role he held for two editions. In 2024, he was named Conservatore of the Cineteca Nazionale.

Della Casa has directed several documentary films; in 2016, he won a Nastro d'Argento for I Tarantiniani, and in 2017, he received a special Nastro d'Argento for Perchè sono un genio! Lorenza Mazzetti and Nessuno ci può giudicare. He wrote numerous film essays, and worked as television and radio writer. He is a professor of film history at the Accademia Nazionale d'Arte Drammatica Silvio D'Amico.

== Personal life ==
Della Casa's nick "Steve" is a reference to sword-and-sandal film star Steve Reeves. He is a Torino FC supporter.

== Books ==
- Mario Monicelli (1986)
- Mario Mattoli (1990)
- Riccardo Freda (1999)
- Dario Argento, il brivido della critica cinematografica (2000)
- Officina torinese. Una passeggiata in cento anni di cinema (2000, with Lorenzo Ventavoli)
- Turin, berceau du cinéma italien (2001)
- Storia e storie del cinema popolare italiano (2001)
- Capitani coraggiosi. Produttori italiani 1945-1975 (2003)
- La buca di Maspero in Scrittori in curva (2009)
- Hollywood sul Tevere (2010)
- Il professor matusa e i suoi hippies, Cinema e musica in Italia (2011)
- Pop Film Art. Visual culture, moda e design nel cinema italiano anni '60 e '70 (2012, with Dario Edoardo Viganò)
- Sbatti Bellocchio in sesta pagina (2012, with Paolo Manera)
- Il grande libro di Ercole. Il cinema mitologico in Italia (2013, with Marco Giusti)
- Spendor (2014)
- Dino Risi. Pensieri, parole, immagini (2016)
- Acido Fenico, Graphic novel (2016, with Giancarlo De Cataldo and Luca Saviotti)
- L'Italia all'Oscar (2019, with Vincenzo Mollica)
- Menamose (2022)
- Argento, due o tre cose che sappiamo di lui (2023)
