= TV2000 =

- Country: Italy
- Broadcast area: Europe
- Headquarters: Rome, Italy

Programming
- Language: Italian
- Picture format: 16:9 (SDTV and HDTV)

Ownership
- Owner: Italian Episcopal Conference

History
- Launched: 1998 (as SAT2000)
- Former names: SAT2000 (1998-2009)

Links
- Website: www.tv2000.it

Availability

Terrestrial
- Digital Italy: via TV Syndication
- Digital Italy: LCN 28, Where available

Streaming media
- Google play App store: Live streaming

TV2000 is an Italy-based broadcasting network that carries Roman Catholic-themed programming, available on digital terrestrial television in Italy and owned by the Italian Episcopal Conference, the conference of the Catholic bishops of Italy.

Launched as Sat 2000 in 1998 and so renamed in 2009, it is broadcast in Italy on DTT channel 28 on mux TIMB 2, via satellite Hot Bird 13B at 13°Est (12092 MHz, pol.H, Sr 29900,3/4) and Eutelsat 9B at 9°Est (12466 MHz, pol.V, Sr 41950, 3/4).

== Programming ==
=== Religious programs ===
- Holy Mass broadcast by the Centro Televisivo Vaticano
- The Holy Rosary from Lourdes.

=== Other programs ===
- Actuality programs like Nel cuore dei giorni
- Information like TG2000
- Educational and inspirational programming such as documentaries from National Geographic Society
- Television series such as Don Matteo from RAI
- Talk shows such as Romanzo familiare
- Classical music concerts
- Current affairs programming

== See also ==
- Catholic television
- Catholic television channels
- Catholic television networks
- Padre Pio TV
- Telepace
- Vatican Media
