= Vatican Radio's Belarusian Service =

Vatican Radio's Belarusian Service is a structural department of the Vatican Radio broadcasting network in the Belarusian language.

== History ==
=== Fr. Piotr Tatarynovich (1950-1970) ===
Vatican Radio started regular broadcasting in the Belarusian language on January 6, 1950. Before that, on December 24, 1949, it transmitted Pope Pius XII's message at Christmas and at the beginning of the Jubilee year in Belarusian. Roman Catholic priest Piotr Tatarynovich was the first editor-in-chief and for a long time the only staff member of the Belarusian Service.

Originally the programs were broadcast on a weekly basis and contained news from the Vatican, information on the Catholic church and the Belarusian diaspora, as well as catechesal and apologetic reflections. Later Fr. Kastus Maskalik joined the Service working mainly as an announcer. Bishop Ceslau Sipovich, Fr. Tamash Padzyava and some other Belarusian Catholic immigrants collaborated with the Service. After his retirement in 1970 Fr. Tatarynovich lived in Rome and was involved in publishing and translation activities.

=== Fr. Leu Garoshka (1970-1977) ===
Leu Garoshka, a Greek-Catholic priest, was in charge of the Vatican Radio's Belarusian Service from 1970 to 1977. By then, the number of programs had increased to five editions a week. Each edition lasted 14 minutes. Apart from the Vatican news, Fr. Garoshka focused on apologetic and Belarusian national themes. He developed a series of programmes on Christian aspects in the Belarusian literature, the history of Christianity in Belarus, Belarusian religious figures and arguments for the existence of God by famous personalities, such as scientists, astronomers, composers.

=== Fr. Robert Tamushanski (1977-1996) ===
After Fr. Garoshka's death in 1977, the Service was headed by Fr. Robert Tamushansky. For the first time the staff included not only priests but also secular believers. In 1980, Pope John Paul II visited the Belarusian Service during his visit to the Vatican Radio. From 1988 to 1993, the Service produced a monthly newsletter on Christian and Belarusian national themes which was distributed by mail among Belarusian immigrants and believers. Live commentaries of solemn Vatican events were broadcast in the Belarusian language. With the opening of borders, the office of the Belarusian Service was visited by the Belarusian Catholic hierarchies, public and cultural figures: Vasyl Bykau, Rygor Baradulin, Anatol Hrytskevich, Adam Maldzis, Janka Zaprudnik, Vitaut Kipel, Fr. Jan Matusevich, Fr. Alexander Nadson, cardinal Kazimir Svyontek and others.

=== Fr. Claude Robinet (1996-2010) ===
In 1996, Belgian Jesuit Fr. Claude Robinet took charge. Contacts with the Belarusian Catholic Church increased during that period. Local correspondents started to send reports. The official website was launched.

== Fr. Aliaksandr Amialchenia (2010-) ==
Starting from 2010, the Belarusian Service was directed by Fr. Aliaksandr Amialchenia. During this period changes brought the Service up to modern broadcasting standards. In particular, the program structure was changed, focusing on relevance, timeliness and ease of comprehension. In April 2011, the Belarusian Service launched an Official Facebook page. Once a week the Service prepares a weekly summary broadcast by the Belarusian radio’s First channel.

The Vatican Radio's Belarusian Service develops a daily 19-min. edition. Its first part includes a block of latest news updates, while the second part includes a thematic section.

== Frequencies ==
Daily editions are broadcast at 19:00 (Italian time; UTC+1:00) on short wave 49 meters and 6185 kHz frequency (winter time) or 25 meters and 11715 kHz frequency (summer time). The programs are replayed at 11:20 (Italian time; UTC+1:00) at FM 93.3 MHz (Rome area). On Sundays at 8:55 the Belarusian Radio’s First Channel broadcasts a five-minute news edition prepared by the Vatican Radio's Belarusian Service on the FM-range covering the whole territory of Belarus.
