= Sufar =

Former Catholic diocese in North Africa

Mauretania Caesariensis in 125 AD

The diocese of Sufar was an episcopal see in the Roman province of Mauretania Caesariensis during late antiquity. The exact location of the see is unknown, but it is believed to have been situated in what is modern-day Algeria.

Christianity arrived relatively late in Mauretania Caesariensis compared to other regions of Roman North Africa, possibly sparing it from some of the earlier theological controversies. Like most bishoprics in the western part of the province, Sufar appears to have flourished from late antiquity until sometime after the First Council of Nicaea.

Two bishops of Sufar are recorded in the Notitiae episcopatuum of 484: Victor and Romanus, both bearing the designation Sufaritanus.

This duplication has led to scholarly debate. Writing in the early nineteenth century, Stefano Antonio Morcelli argued that the town known as Sufasar, located between Manliana and Veliscos in Mauretania Caesariensis according to the Itinerarium Antonini, came to be known in abbreviated form as Sufar. He maintained that the episcopal title Sufaritanus was a contraction of Sufasaritanus, and that both Victor and Romanus may have belonged to the same see rather than to two distinct dioceses. Morcelli also noted that Victor was among the Catholic bishops exiled by the Vandal king Huneric after the synod of 484, and that Romanus, listed shortly after Victor, was likewise a Catholic, although some sources may have erroneously treated him as Donatist.

Joseph Mesnage, writing nearly a century later, followed a similar line of reasoning in suggesting that Sufaritanus may be a contracted form of Sufasaritanus, and that one of the two bishops traditionally assigned to Sufar might have belonged instead to the diocese of Sufasar. He also proposed an alternative theory, namely that one of the names listed as "Sufar" in the Notitia may refer to Safar, a city in the region of Altava attested in Latin epigraphy.

The duplication of bishops in the Notitia thus remains a point of scholarly uncertainty, possibly reflecting either scribal error, contraction of toponyms, or the existence of multiple similarly named sees. Whatever the case, the diocese likely ceased to function following the Muslim conquest of the Maghreb.

In 1933, the see of Sufar was restored as a titular see. The incumbent titular bishop is Robert Reed, who was appointed in 2016, succeeding Robert Prevost, who was later elected Pope Leo XIV in 2025.

== Known bishops ==
- Victor (fl. 484)
- Romanus (fl. 484)
- Patrick Joseph Casey (1965–1969)
- Carlos Stanislaus Schmitt (1970–1971)
- Ernst Gutting (1971–2013)
- Robert Prevost (2014–2015)
- Robert Reed (2016–present)

== See also ==
- Mauretania Caesariensis
- Sufasar
