= Vatican News =

Catholic news website

- Logo of Vatican News (2024)
- Type: News website
- Owner: The Holy See
- Founder: Pope Francis
- Editor-in-chief: Andrea Tornielli
- Associate editor: Sergio Centofanti; Alessandro Gisotti
- Prefect: Paolo Ruffini
- Founded: 27 June 2015
- Language: English, Italian, French, German, Spanish, Portuguese, Polish, Arabic, Armenian, Azerbaijani, Belarusian, Bulgarian, Czech, Esperanto, Hebrew, Croatian, Hungarian, Indonesian, Latvian, Lithuanian, Macedonian, Mongolian, Romanian, Albanian, Slovak, Slovenian, Swedish, Russian, Ukrainian, Hindi, Malayalam, Tamil, Kannada, Vietnamese, Japanese, Korean, Chinese and Latin
- Headquarters: Vatican City State
- Country: Vatican City
- Website: vaticannews.va

Vatican News is the official news portal of the Holy See, serving as a source of information about the activities, pronouncements, and events related to the global Catholic Church and the operations of the Holy See. As a part of the Dicastery for Communication, it plays a central role in disseminating multimedia content that is relevant to the Catholic Church's followers, as well as the broader public interested in Vatican affairs. It brings together Vatican Radio, L'Osservatore Romano and Vatican Media.

The Dicastery for Communication, which oversees Vatican News, is responsible for supervising various communication channels within the Holy See. These channels include Vatican Radio, L'Osservatore Romano (the Vatican's daily newspaper), and Vatican Media, all of which collectively contribute to the comprehensive multimedia coverage of the Vatican's activities. It is based with Vatican Radio at Piazza Pia n. 3 in Vatican City.

== History ==
=== Early background ===
A website under the name News.va launched on 27 June 2011. At the time, it was often referred to as The Vatican Today. News.va launched The Pope App in January 2013.

=== Founding of Vatican News ===
On 27 June 2015, Pope Francis, through a motu proprio ('on his own initiative') apostolic letter, established the Secretariat for Communications in the Roman Curia, with the aim of unifying and optimizing Vatican communication. The website News.va and the Pontifical Council were expected to be incorporated in it eventually. The Vatican News website lists this date as the beginning of the publication.

== See also ==
- Index of Vatican City-related articles
- L'Osservatore Romano
- Vatican Media
- Vatican Radio
