= Robert P. Reed =

American Catholic prelate (born 1959)

The Most Reverend Robert P. Reed
- Auxiliary Bishop of Boston
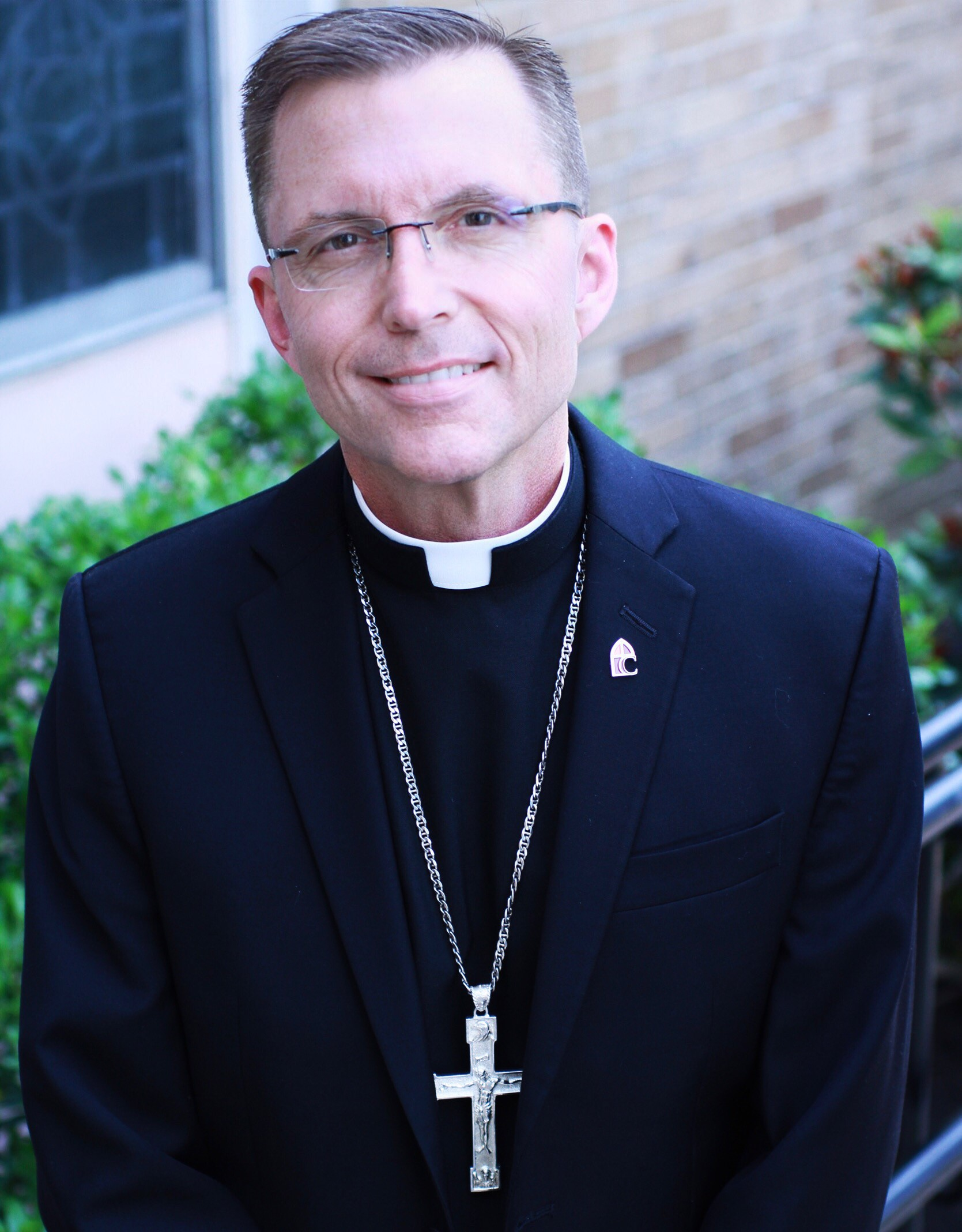
- Church: Catholic Church
- Archdiocese: Boston
- Appointed: June 3, 2016
- Installed: August 24, 2016
- Other posts: President, CatholicTV Network (2005–); CEO, iCatholic Media, Inc.; Titular Bishop of Sufar (2016–); Rector, Saint John's Seminary (2026–)

Orders
- Ordination: July 6, 1985
- Consecration: August 24, 2016 by Seán Patrick O'Malley, Arthur Kennedy, and Robert Deeley

Personal details
- Born: June 11, 1959 (age 67) Boston, Massachusetts, US
- Education: Saint John's Seminary; Pontifical North American College; Boston University
- Motto: Iesus sola nobis spes (Latin for 'Jesus is our only hope')
- Styles
- Reference style: His Excellency; The Most Reverend
- Spoken style: Your Excellency
- Religious style: Bishop

Robert Philip Reed (born June 11, 1959) is an American Catholic prelate serving as an auxiliary bishop for the Archdiocese of Boston in Massachusetts since 2016. He is the president of the CatholicTV Network.

== Biography ==
=== Early life and education ===
Reed was born in Boston, Massachusetts, on June 11, 1959, to William and Jeanne Reed. He grew up in Swampscott, Massachusetts, attending parochial schools in that town. Reed then attended at St. John's Preparatory School, a Catholic high school in Danvers, Massachusetts.

It was during high school that Reed decided to become a priest. After his graduation, Reed entered Saint John's Seminary in Boston. The Archdiocese of Boston then sent Reed to attend the Pontifical North American College in Rome.

=== Priesthood ===
Reed was ordained into the priesthood by Cardinal Bernard Law on July 6, 1985, for the Archdiocese of Boston at St. John the Evangelist Church in Swampscott. After his ordination, the archdiocese assigned Reed to a pastoral position at Immaculate Conception Parish in Medford, Massachusetts. Reed has also served in several other parishes in Eastern Massachusetts:

- St. Catherine of Siena in Norwood
- St. Matthew in Dorchester
- All Saints in Haverhill
- Holy Ghost in Whitman
- St. Bonaventure in Plymouth
- Good Shepherd in Wayland
- St. Mary in East Walpole
- Blessed Sacrament in Walpole

In addition to parish assignments, Reed began a career in broadcasting for the archdiocese. Since the 1980s, he has hosted a Sunday morning radio program, The Catholic Hour. Reed earned a degree in television management from Boston University, and joined the Boston Catholic Television Center. He held the titles of director of educational development, assistant director, and director. Reed is the president of the CatholicTV Network and CEO of iCatholic Media, Inc.

=== Auxiliary Bishop of Boston ===
On June 3, 2016, Pope Francis appointed Reed as an auxiliary bishop of Boston and titular bishop of Sufar. He was consecrated on August 24, 2016, at the Cathedral of the Holy Cross in Boston by Cardinal Seán O'Malley, with Bishops Robert Peter Deeley and Arthur Kennedy as co-consecrators. As of 2024, Reed serves as a vicar general and the regional bishop of the west region of the archdiocese.

For the United States Conference of Catholic Bishops (USCCB), Reed is currently a member of the board for Catholic Relief Services, he served on the Committee for Migration, the Committee for Pro-Life Activities, the Committee for Religious Liberty and he was chair of the Committee on Communication. In June 2023, he and three other USCCB committee chairs sent a letter to the US Congress asking lawmakers to address the exploitation of children in social media and other online settings.

=== Rector of Saint John's Seminary ===
On March 24, 2026 it was announced that Reed had been named 23rd rector of Saint John's Seminary, a major seminary in Brighton, Massachusetts sponsored by the Archdiocese of Boston, effective at the start of the 2026-2027 academic year. With this appointment, Reed ceased to be responsible for the west region of the archdiocese, but remained an auxiliary bishop and retained his position at CatholicTV.

== Media ==
Since being named president of CatholicTV in 2005, Reed has expanded the network and rebranded it as The CatholicTV Network.. He has also expanded the staff and created shows and series for the network.

=== Shows on CatholicTV ===
- Inter Nos
- House + Home
- ClearVoice
- Renewed
- This is the Day
- Viaggio a Roma
- WOW: The CatholicTV Challenge

=== Books ===
- Renewed: Ten Ways to Rediscover the Saints, Embrace Your Gifts and Revive Your Catholic Faith (2014): ISBN 978-1594714702

== Memberships ==
- Knight commander of the Equestrian Order of the Holy Sepulchre of Jerusalem
- Patriotic (fourth) degree member of the Knights of Columbus

== See also ==
- Catholic Church hierarchy
- Catholic Church in the United States
- Historical list of the Catholic bishops of the United States
- List of the Catholic bishops of the United States
- Lists of patriarchs, archbishops, and bishops

Catholic Church titles
Preceded by Robert Francis Prevost	Auxiliary Bishop of Boston; 2016–present	Succeeded by Incumbent
