= CatholicTV =

US-based Catholic television network

Coordinates: 42°22′01″N 71°11′23″W

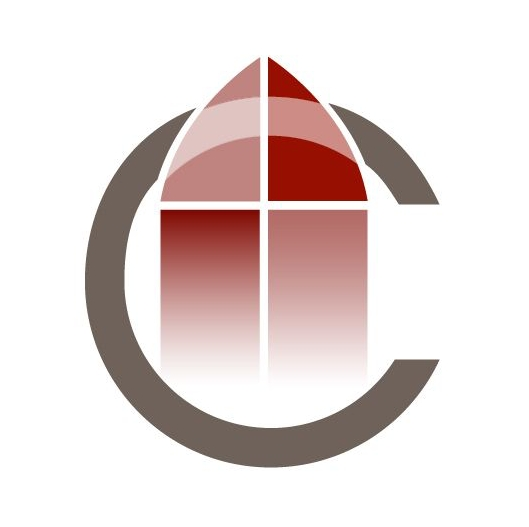
- Country: United States
- Broadcast area: North America, Worldwide
- Headquarters: 34 Chestnut Street, Watertown, Massachusetts

Programming
- Picture format: 480i (SDTV); 1080i (HDTV)

Ownership
- Owner: iCatholic Media (Archdiocese of Boston)

History
- Launched: January 1, 1955 (71 years ago)
- Former names: Catholic Television Center / WIHS (1955–1964), BCTV (1964–2006)

Links
- Webcast: catholictv.org/watch-live
- Website: catholictv.org

The CatholicTV Network, commonly known as CatholicTV, is a Catholic television network based in Watertown, Massachusetts. CatholicTV first launched locally in Boston in 1955, making it the oldest Catholic television network in the United States. Today, it is distributed on cable television systems, internet television, and broadcast stations in sixteen U.S. states and the U.S. Virgin Islands and now worldwide.

CatholicTV broadcasts programming relevant to Catholic viewers, including live religious services, talk shows, devotional programs, educational series, entertainment, and children's programs. The network regularly presents coverage of liturgies and special events at the Vatican and during papal journeys.

As of 2016, the president of the CatholicTV Network is Bishop Robert P. Reed.

== History ==
The first program of the Catholic Television Center of the Archdiocese of Boston was produced on the morning of January 1, 1955, when Archbishop Richard J. Cushing celebrated a Pontifical Low Mass in studios at 25 Granby Street near Kenmore Square in Boston. From that studio, equipped with three RCA TK31 cameras, the Center produced live and tape-recorded programs, and it purchased time from local commercial television stations to air the Sunday Mass each week. Live programs were transmitted to the broadcasting stations through a leased-line telephone connection. In 1961 the Catholic Television Center's studios became the temporary home of educational broadcaster WGBH-TV when that station's studios were destroyed in a fire.

In 1957 the Catholic Television Center acquired a license to operate its own broadcasting station in Boston on channel 38 in the new UHF range of television channels. The Center's station, WIHS-TV, went into service on October 12, 1964, with transmitting facilities on the Prudential Tower in Boston. It was the first full-time Catholic television station in the world employing a general entertainment format along with the daily and Sunday Mass. On July 27, 1966, Storer Broadcasting acquired WIHS for $2,276,513.16 and renamed it as WSBK-TV.

With funds from the station sale, the Catholic Television Center built an Instructional Television Fixed Service (ITFS) system for distributing programs to Catholic schools, and it continued to produce live broadcasts of the Sunday Mass under the name Boston Catholic Television (BCTV). In 1970 BCTV moved into leased studios at 55 Chapel Street in Newton, Massachusetts.

In April 1983 BCTV began offering programs to home viewers several hours a day through its own channel carried by cable television providers, at first in Massachusetts, then elsewhere in New England, and also as far away as Montreal, Quebec. In addition to the Sunday Mass broadcast on conventional (over-the-air) television, weekday Masses were also presented Monday to Friday, originating from a chapel in the Archbishop's residence in Brighton.

In 2006 the channel adopted the brand name CatholicTV and the slogan America's Catholic Television Network. By 2007 it had entered into a programming exchange agreement with the Canadian channel Salt + Light Television. The channel converted its video format to HDTV on October 13, 2010.

The CatholicTV Network relocated its studios and offices to Watertown, Massachusetts, in 2007.

== Distribution ==
CatholicTV programming is seen on cable systems in Massachusetts, California, Hawaii, Louisiana, Maine, Maryland, Michigan, New Hampshire, New Jersey, New York, Ohio, Pennsylvania, Rhode Island, Tennessee, Texas, Vermont, and the U.S. Virgin Islands. It is broadcast in Fresno, California on KNXT, channel 50 and in Hawaii on KUPU, channel 15. CatholicTV is available to satellite television viewers via the digital C band satellite AMC-11. Internet users can view the channel through the web site catholictv.com, or with applications for iOS or Android mobile devices. Internet video is also available through the streaming media devices Roku, Google TV, and Apple TV. Select programs are available for download at iTunes. Video-on-demand service is available on Roku and Apple TV (nationally) and Verizon FiOS in most markets.

== Programming ==
The network features a variety of Catholic educational and inspirational programming produced in the United States, Canada, Ireland and Vatican City. These include talk shows such as "This is the Day", devotional programs such as the Holy Rosary, the Chaplet of the Divine Mercy and Benediction, catechetical programs, musical shows, entertainment and variety shows, and youth programs such as the quiz show WOW. The network presents Sunday Masses from the National Shrine in Washington, the Basilica at Notre Dame, the cathedral in San Antonio, and the network's own chapel. In addition, CatholicTV presents weekday and Saturday Masses from the chapel.

CatholicTV often broadcasts live coverage of the ordinations and installations of newly appointed diocesan bishops, and presents programming from the Vatican Television Center, including coverage of the journeys of Pope Francis.

Catholic Television of San Antonio (CTSA-15) provides some locally produced content for CatholicTV and regularly sends news content for CTV's show, This is the Day.

A partial listing of CatholicTV programs:

=== Religious services and devotional programs ===
- Daily Mass from the CatholicTV studios
- Saturday Vigil Mass from the Basilica of the National Shrine of the Immaculate Conception, Washington, DC
- Sunday Mass live from the Basilica of the Sacred Heart at Notre Dame University
- Chaplet of the Divine Mercy
- Perpetual Help Novena from the Basilica and Shrine of Our Lady of Perpetual Help
- The Holy Rosary
- The Stations of the Cross
- The Angelus

=== Spanish-language programs ===
- Perpetual Help Novena from the Basilica and Shrine of Our Lady of Perpetual Help
- Sunday Mass from the CatholicTV Chapel
- Sunday Mass from San Fernando Cathedral in San Antonio (bilingual)
- Cristo Para Todos
- Cambio de Agujas
- Dios Nunca Duerme
- Donde Dios Llora produced by Aid to the Church in Need

=== Programs for youth ===
- Adventures of Donkey Ollie
- Adventures in Odyssey
- Ascension Cafe
- Bugtime Adventures
- Dr. Wonders Workshop
- Fred and Susie
- Kid's Saints and Heroes
- Real Faith TV (teen catechism, from the Diocese of Trenton)
- WOW: The CatholicTV Challenge

=== Music ===
- The Joy of Music (organist Diane Bish)
- Revolution (Christian music videos and artist interviews)
- Going My Way (with Father Chris Hickey and Father Paul Rouse)

=== Vatican Television Center programs ===
- Vatican Magazine
- The General Papal Audience

=== History and biography ===
- Catholic Saints and Lay People (biography)
- Church History (Prof. Ann Orlando)
- The Little Flower
- 100 Years of Father Peyton
- Roots of Faith (history of the Church in Louisiana)

=== Scripture ===
- Experiencing Paul, Experiencing God (Prof. John Clabeaux)
- The Gospel of Matthew (Prof. John Clabeaux)
- Looking at the Hebrew Scriptures (Rabbi Samuel Chiel)
- Mark the Perilous Journey (Prof. Clabeaux)
- The New and Eternal Word (Msgr. James Moroney)
- Sacred Time (Bishop Christopher Coyne)
- The Word Exposed (Cardinal Luis Antonio Tagle)

=== Other programs ===
- BLINK (magazine show)
- Body Matters (medical ethics and life issues)
- The Call (vocations to religious life and the priesthood)
- Catholic Corner (from Princeton, New Jersey)
- Catholic Destinations (travel)
- Catholic Focus (current affairs)
- Catholicism with Bishop Robert Barron
- Catholics Matter (from Phoenix, Arizona)
- CatholicTV Presents (specials)
- The Choices We Face (Catholic evangelist Ralph Martin)
- ClearVoice (weekly magazine with John Monahan and Christine Caswell)
- A Closer Walk (Fr. Jeff Bayhi)
- Conversations with Cardinal Seán
- Day of Discovery (RBC Ministries)
- Defenders of the Faith (Steve Ray)
- Discernment of Spirits (Fr. Timothy Gallagher, on Ignatian spiritual teaching)
- Facing Life Head-On (life issues)
- Faith Café (Evangelization)
- Feed My Sheep
- Focus (Abp. Philip Hannan)
- From the Chair (conversations with Catholic bishops)
- The Future Depends on Love
- The Gist (exclusively for women)
- Going My Way (talk show)
- Good News with Monsignor Jim Vlaun
- Hope on Campus (campus ministry with the Brotherhood of Hope)
- House+Home (family life)
- Images of Jesus
- In & Out (the work of Catholic missionaries)
- Issues and Faith (religious news, from the Archdiocese of New Orleans)
- Listen Up (news and current events)
- Matters of Faith (from the Diocese of Buffalo)
- Mothering Full of Grace
- Nineveh’s Crossing
- One Billion Stories (Seth DeMoor)
- Our Daily Bread with Father Paul Seil
- parishFAMILY (parish life and ministry)
- Real to Reel (magazine program, from the Diocese of Springfield, Massachusetts)
- Sacred Time (Bishop Christopher Coyne)
- School of Faith (Frank DeVito)
- 7th Street Theatre (Drama meets Christianity)
- SpotLight (movie reviews)
- This is the Day (talk show)
- Travel and Traditions (Burt Wolf)
- The Way of Beauty (artist David Clayton)
- We’ve Got to Talk (Fr. Daniel O'Connell)
- Where God Weeps (Aid to the Church in Need)
- Witness with Father Thomas Rosica
- Woman at the Heart of the Church
- Women in God’s Spirit (WINGS)
- Word For Word
- The Word Exposed with Cardinal Luis Antonio Tagle
- The Word in the World with Father Michael Manning
- Word on Fire with Bishop Robert Barron

=== Short features ===
The network also presents short television features on general Christian themes and public service announcements from the Ad Council and other providers related to Catholic social teaching and issues such as family life, health, education, community, and the well-being of children.

== Patron saint ==
Saint Thérèse of Lisieux is the patroness of CatholicTV.

== See also ==
- Catholic television
- Catholic television channels
- Catholic television networks
- International religious television broadcasters
