= Torino Film Festival =

Annual film festival held in Turin, Italy

- Location: Turin, Italy
- Founded: 1982
- Most recent: 2024
- Hosted by: National Cinema Museum
- Festival date: 22–30 November 2025
- Website: www.torinofilmfest.org

Current: 43rd Torino Film Festival
- 44th 42nd

The Torino Film Festival (also called the Turin Film Festival, TFF) is an international film festival held annually in Turin, Italy. Held every November, it is the second largest film festival in Italy, following the Venice Film Festival. It was founded in 1982 by film critic and professor Gianni Rondolino as Festival Internazionale Cinema Giovani or the Festival of Young Cinema. The festival's directors have included Alberto Barbera, Steve Della Casa, Giulia d'Agnolo, Roberto Turigliatto, Nanni Moretti, Gianni Amelio and Paolo Virzì. As of 2024, the director is Giulio Base.

== History ==
Gianni Rondolino founded the Festival Internazionale Cinema Giovani in 1982 in Turin, a city that was in economic decline. The festival, attracting big names in Italian and international cinema, helped to re-energise the city both economically and culturally. The first directors were Rondolino and Ansano Gianarelli. In 1998, the festival's name changed to the Torino Film Festival. In 2007, film director Nanni Moretti was appointed as director of the festival, with a view to making it more prominent on an international level. Moretti left the post in 2008, after two festivals, to focus on his own filmmaking. He was succeeded by film director Gianni Amelio.

The 39th edition of the festival was held from 27 November to 4 December 2021. The festival opened with animated musical comedy Sing 2 by Garth Jennings and honoured Monica Bellucci with a lifetime achievement award.
