= WOW: The CatholicTV Challenge =

US television program

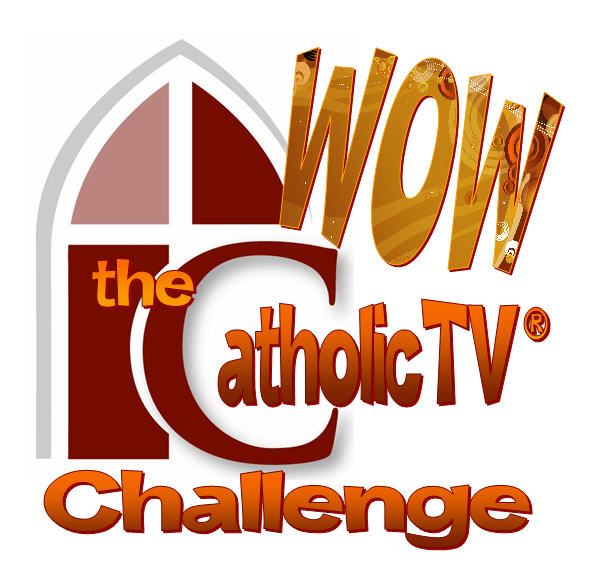
- 2008 logo for WOW: The CatholicTV Challenge.
- Created by: Robert P. Reed
- Developed by: Charles Green; Mark Quell
- Directed by: Peter Kaminski
- Presented by: Robert P. Reed
- Narrated by: Kevin Nelson
- Country of origin: United States

Production
- Executive producers: Robert P. Reed; Jay Fadden
- Producer: Peter Kaminski

Original release
- Network: CatholicTV
- Release: September 6, 2004 – present

WOW: The CatholicTV Challenge is a game show presented on the CatholicTV cable network. The series was developed in 2004 to teach the basic facts of the Catholic Faith through the lives of young children.

== History ==
=== Origin ===
The program first aired on September 6, 2005. It was created by the president of CatholicTV, Robert P. Reed. The show's title was conceived by Sean Ward, coordinator of new media at the network.

=== Interview format (2005–2007) ===
The original format, simply called WOW, was used for the first three seasons and styled after Kids Say the Darndest Things. Participants discussed the theme of the day, getting "Wowsers" (simple foam representations of the show's logo) for saying the "deepest" things. At the end, the child with the most Wowsers received a prize.

=== Quiz format (2007–present) ===
Beginning in 2007, the format changed to a question-answer game show. Three children, introduced by the animated canine "Nosey the Know-it-All Dog", attempt to answer questions around the day's common theme, called a "Wudabout"; Nosey also asks any tie-breaker and "Super Challenge" questions.

After five minutes, the high scorer moves on and another set of three contestants is introduced; after three rounds, each five minutes long, the three winners compete in the Final Challenge. The winner of this round receives a prize.

Since the purpose of the show is to convey an understanding of basic Catholic beliefs to viewers both young and old, the series actively gives prospective contestants any and all questions with the answers for study one month in advance of the taping.

=== Past winners ===
Past winners include Matt Mears a 2nd grader from Saint Joseph’s Elementary School and Matthew Derby a 2nd grader from Our Lady of Assumption School

== Production team ==
As of 2016, Reed is the program's host and executive producer. Peter Kaminski produces and directs the show, while CatholicTV senior producer Kevin Nelson is announcer.
