= The God Squad (Telecare) =

American television program

The God Squad was an American television program which featured Rabbi Marc Gellman and Monsignor Tom Hartman discussing issues related to religion. The program went off the air on 2007 though the duo continued to appear under the name on other programs including Good Morning America.

The program was produced at Telecare, the cable channel of the Roman Catholic Diocese of Rockville Centre on New York's Long Island. As "The God Squad", the two clergymen also made recurring appearances on Good Morning America starting in 1995, addressing issues of religion and spirituality. They also appeared on Imus in the Morning. The pair was featured as animated characters in an HBO special based on their children's book, How Do You Spell God?: Answers to the Big Questions From Around the World. The book was recognized with the Christopher Award in 1991. The "God Squad" was also the subject on "CBS News Sunday Morning" April 23, 2000.

Hartman celebrated Mass at St. Vincent de Paul in Elmont, New York. Gellman is rabbi at Temple Beth Torah in Dix Hills, New York.

In 2000 Turner Classic Movies ran a special series, Hollywood: Religion in the Movies. Hartman and Gellman recorded segments for the network, discussing how religious themes were treated in the respective films. After the series ran, Turner Classic Movies continued to run segments of Gellman and Hartman discussing religion in the movies.

Hartman and Gellman also wrote a syndicated column called The God Squad, distributed through Tribune Media Services. In 2003, Hartman announced to readers that he had suffered from Parkinson's disease for four years but tried to keep it secret as long as he could. Gellman continues to write the column himself.

Hartman died on February 16, 2016, after fighting Parkinson's disease for sixteen years.

In March 2022, Gellman announced the debut of The God Squad podcast with Rabbi Marc Gellman.
