= Joaquín Navarro-Valls =

Spanish journalist, physician and academic

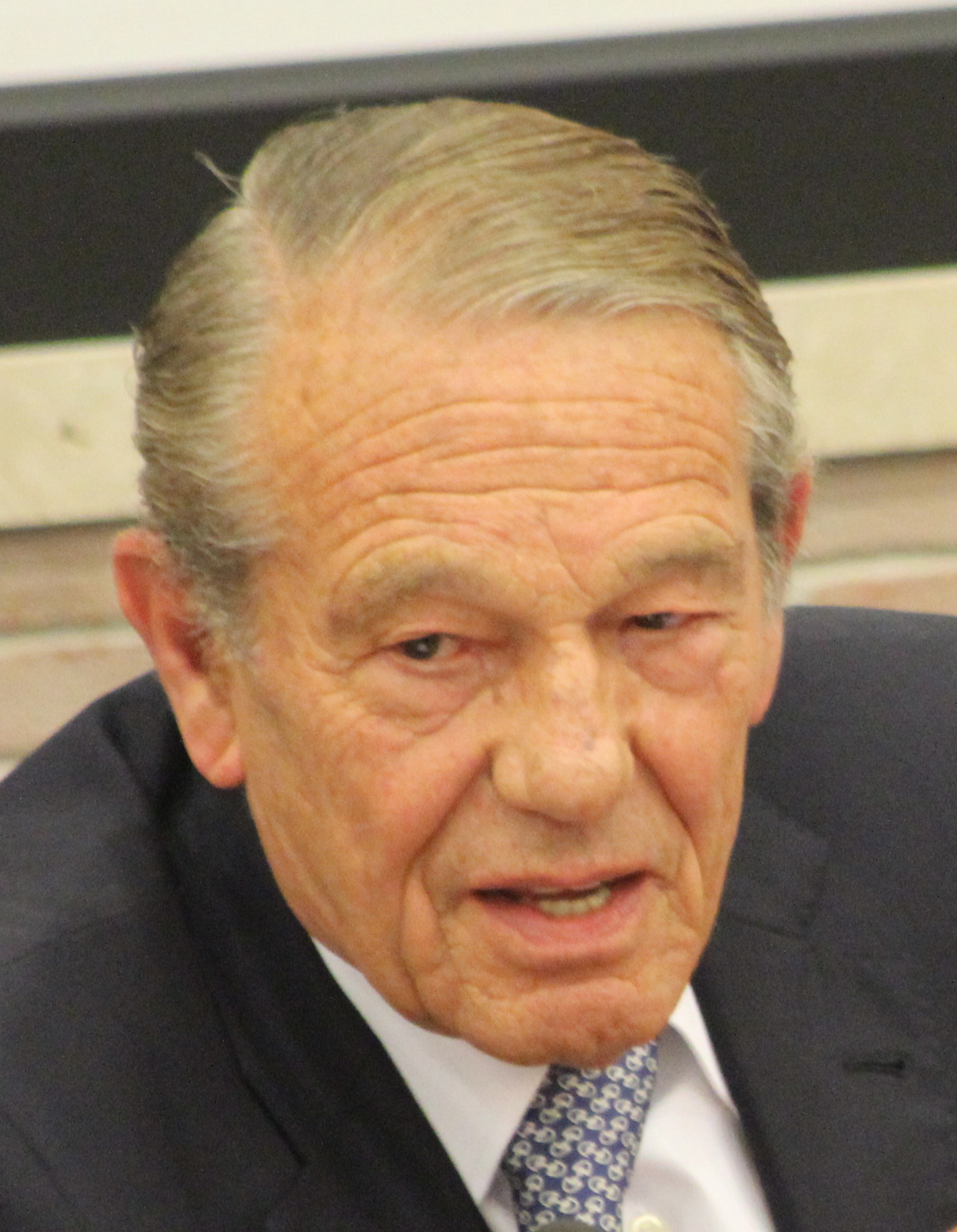
- Navarro-Valls in 2014
- Born: 16 November 1936; Cartagena, Spain
- Died: 5 July 2017 (aged 80); Rome, Italy
- Education: Deutsche Schule; University of Granada; University of Barcelona; University of Navarra
- Occupations: Journalist, physician, academic

Joaquín Navarro-Valls, M.D. (16 November 1936 – 5 July 2017) was a Spanish journalist, physician and academic who served as the director of the Holy See Press Office from 1984 to 2006. His role as the press liaison between the Vatican and the world press corps gave him perhaps the highest visibility of any one person in the Vatican during the long reign of Pope John Paul II, with the exception of the Pope himself. He resigned his post 11 July 2006 and was replaced by Father Federico Lombardi. On 20 January 2007, he was named president of the board of advisers of the Biomedical University of Rome, an office he occupied until his death.

== Background and education ==
Navarro-Valls studied at the Deutsche Schule in Cartagena, and then studied medicine at the Universities of Granada and Barcelona, as well as journalism at the Faculty of Sciences of Communication at the University of Navarra in Pamplona, Spain. He also took post-graduate studies at Harvard University in the United States. He graduated summa cum laude in Medicine and Surgery in 1961 and took courses for a doctorate in Psychiatry in "Psychiatric disorders in cranial traumas" (Trastornos psiquiátricos en los traumas craneales). In addition, he taught at the Faculty of Medicine.

In 1968, received a degree in journalism and in the science of communication in 1980.

He was fluent in Spanish, English, French, German and Italian. Navarro-Valls died in Rome on 5 July 2017, at the age of 80.

== Professional career ==
Navarro-Valls was a foreign correspondent for both Nuestro Tiempo and the Spanish daily newspaper ABC. Esteemed by his colleagues, he was elected a member of the board of directors (1979) and later president of the Foreign Press Association, Italy (1983 and 1984).

From 1996 until 2001, he served as President of the Administration Board of the "Maruzza Lefebvre d'Ovidio" Foundation for terminally ill cancer patients.

== Liaison of the Vatican ==
Navarro-Valls' work with the Holy See enabled him to be a member of the Holy See Delegation to international conferences of the United Nations in Cairo (1994), Copenhagen (1995), Beijing (1995), and Istanbul (1996). His continued work in medicine and journalism allowed him to participate in national and international conferences on psychiatry and/or communication as a guest speaker. From 1996 he was a visiting professor at the Faculty of Institutional Social Communications of the Pontifical University of the Holy Cross in Rome.

Navarro-Valls was particularly important as a press liaison during the last few years of the reign of Pope John Paul II (reigned 1978–2005). This was especially true during the final six months of Pope John Paul's reign, during which time Navarro-Valls' expertise as a physician was important in communicating the pope's health to the press. He was apparently instrumental in bringing a high level of candor to the bulletins which daily informed the world concerning the aged pope's declining health. His own emotional closeness to the pope was apparent as the end drew near.

With the election of Joseph Cardinal Ratzinger as Pope Benedict XVI — and with the new pope's approval — Navarro-Valls continued in his post for almost two years.

Navarro-Valls was a member of the Catholic prelature Opus Dei (The Work of God), dating back to 1970, when he lived in the central headquarters with St Josemaría Escrivá, the founder of Opus Dei.

As a numerary of Opus Dei, he committed himself to celibacy, although as a lay person and not a religious this was not a formal vow. When asked about this, he told one reporter: "Celibacy is a vow taken by religious. In my case, instead, was the choice of a way of life and behaviour. In any case...it was not difficult. Every choice in life necessarily involves leaving something else behind. Those who want to have everything end up without ever truly marrying one idea, and so do not generate children, in the analogical sense; that is, to give birth to other new ideas."

In 1988, he received the Ischia International Journalism Award. In 2007, he was awarded the Commander's Cross with Star Order of Merit of the Republic of Poland by the President of Poland.

== Published books ==
- La Manipulación publicitaria. Barcelona (1970)
- La familia y el mundo actual. Barcelona (1976)
- La familia y la educación. Caracas (1978)
- Fumata blanca. Ediciones Rialp, Madrid (1978), ISBN 84-321-1969-5

== Memorable dates ==
- 1936: Joaquín Navarro-Valls is born in Cartagena, Murcia, Spain on November 6. His father, Joaquín, is an accomplished attorney. His mother, Conchita Valls, dedicates herself to her five children.
- 1953: Having finished his classical studies at the "Deutsche Schule" in his hometown, he enters the faculty of medicine at Granada. Three years later, he goes to the University of Barcelona. The scientific journal "Actualidad Medica" publishes his first research work.
- 1958: He meets Josemaría Escrivá and joins Opus Dei as a numerary.
- 1961: He receives a degree in medicine and specializes first in internal medicine and then in psychiatry. He fulfills his military service as a doctor in the Spanish Navy, and obtains a seminar scholarship from Harvard University.
- 1961–70: While exercising his profession of internal medicine and then psychiatry at the hospital, he receives two other degrees: in journalism in 1968, and in communication sciences in 1970. He publishes his first non-medical essay: "Manipulation in Advertising."
- 1970: He moves to Rome, where he continues his studies in psychiatry and lives beside Josemaría Escrivá until Escrivá's death in 1975. He publishes two essays on evolutionary psychology.
- 1977: He becomes a correspondent for the Madrid newspaper ABC, covering Italy and the eastern Mediterranean. He is frequently sent as a correspondent to Japan, the Philippines, and equatorial Africa.
- 1983: He is elected president of the Foreign Press Association in Italy, and reconfirmed the following year.
- 1984: Pope John Paul II calls him to reorganize and direct the Vatican press office, the first non cleric to be appointed ever as director of the Vatican Press Office.
- 1994–96. He is a member of the Holy See delegation to the international conferences of the UN in Cairo, Copenhagen, Beijing, and Istanbul.
- 1996: He begins to teach as a visiting professor at the faculty of institutional communication at the Pontifical University of the Holy Cross in Rome.
- 1997: He is sent as a speaker to the world congress of psychiatry in Madrid.
- 2005: Upon the death of Pope John Paul II, the new pope, Benedict XVI, reconfirms him as director of the press office. He recently received the latest of many honors: an honorary doctorate from the University of Valencia, an honorary doctorate in Law from the University of Murcia followed by three other honorary doctorates from the Universities of Naples and Varese, Italy, and the Universitat Internacional de Catalunya all three of them in Sciences of Communications. Also in 2005 he received the Luka Brajnovic Award from the University of Navarra School of Communications.

He then was awarded another two honorary doctorates in Humane Letters Christendom College, Virginia, United States and in Science St. John's University, New York, United States

- In the year 2004/05, Joaquín Navarro-Valls was awarded an honorary doctorate from CEU Cardinal Herrera University
- 2006: He announces that he has asked Pope Benedict XVI to allow him to resign (June). His request is finally accepted on July 11, 2007.
- 2007: Appointed President of the Advisory Board of the Università Campus Bio-Medico, Rome, Italy.
- 2009: Appointed President of the Telecom Italia Foundation, Rome, Italy
