= Shalom World =

- Broadcast area: Worldwide
- Headquarters: Edinburg, Texas, United States

Programming
- Language: English Spanish German
- Picture format: 1080i HDTV

Ownership
- Owner: Shalom Media USA Inc (a non-profit corporation)
- Key people: Rev. Dr. Roy Palatty CMI (Spiritual Director): Santo Thomas(Chief Executive Officer)

History
- Launched: April 27, 2014; 12 years ago

Links
- Website: www.shalomworld.org

Availability

Streaming media
- LIVE Stream: Live TV Stream
- Digital media receiver: Roku, Opera TV, Android TV, LG Smart TV, Philips, Toshiba, Sony, Sharp, Panasonic, Xbox One, Mi, Roku, Amazon Fire TV, HoloLens, Apple TV (4th generation)

The Shalom World Logo Explained

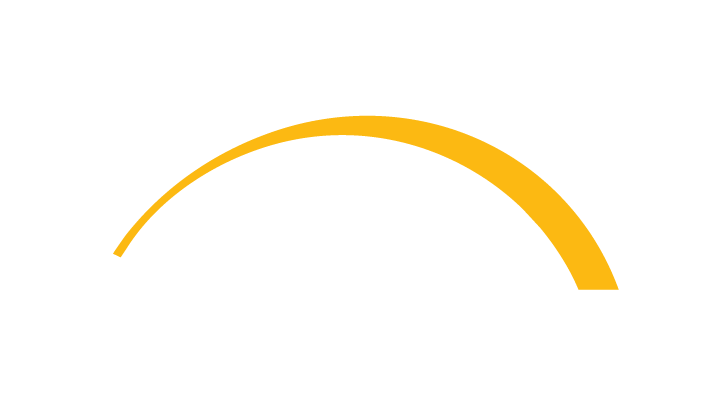
WORLD

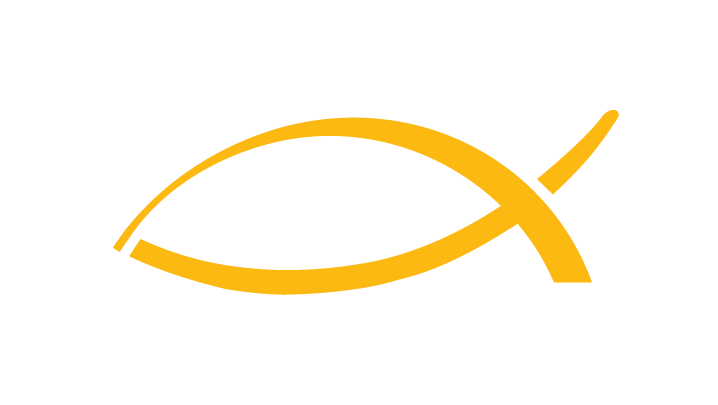
ICHTYS(Jesus Christ)

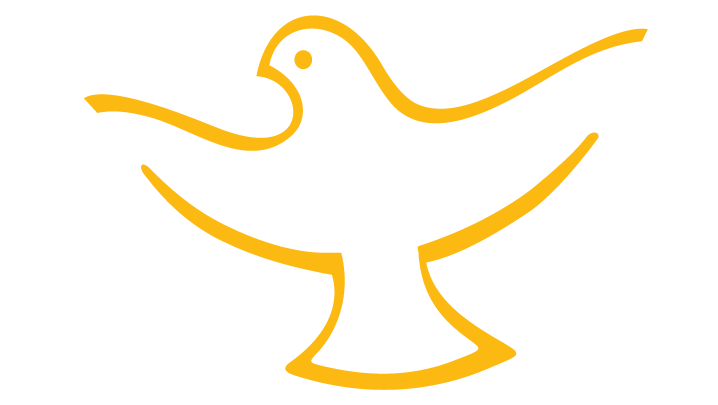
PEACE OF CHRIST(Holy Spirit)

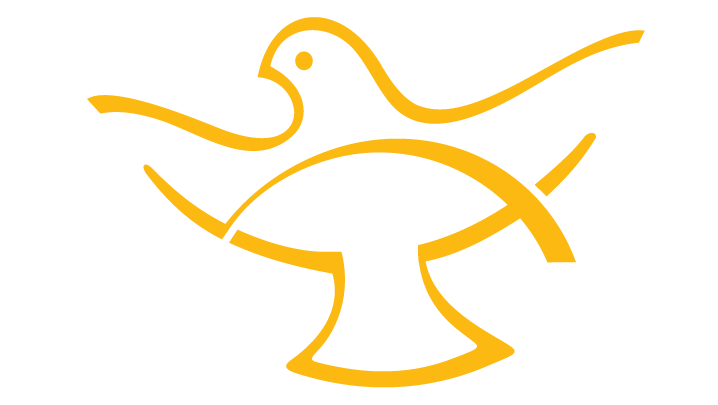
PEACE OF CHRIST TO THE WORLD

Shalom World is a 24-hour, commercial-free, English-language television channel that broadcasts spiritual and religious programs related to the Christian faith. The channel broadcasts Catholic Mass, documentaries, animations, music videos, concerts, conferences, events and other programs that are relevant to the Catholic Church.

The channel in different countries aims to provide a platform for local evangelization and is tailored to the needs of the local culture. Shalom World TV is broadcast across 5 continents.The channel has a cumulative viewership of 8 million viewers in 140 countries across three channels – Shalom World North America, Shalom World Europe, and Shalom World Australia. The channel provides additional support to the pastoral efforts of the Church. During the global COVID-19 movement, the channel was used as a resource for people to attend Mass through television, with Holy Mass with Pope Francis as the most-viewed program.

== Event broadcasts ==
- March for Life 2026
- World Youth Day 2023
- World Youth Day 2019
- World Meeting of Families 2018
- Adoremus
- Ignite Conference
- Proclaim 2018
- Florida Eucharistic Congress 2016
- Pray for India

== History ==
Shalom World was launched on April 27, 2014, in North America as a Catholic television network catering to people of all ages. It took its origin from Shalom ministry which was started in Peruvannamuzhi, a remote village in Kerala, India in 1989 as a small prayer group. This group of young men led by Benny Punnathara, under the guidance of Monsignor C. J. Varkey, sought to spread the Good News of Jesus Christ using modern means of mass communication hence setting up Shalom Media. Shalom is a Hebrew word meaning ‘peace.’ Apart from these media initiatives, the ministry also organizes retreats and leadership conferences inviting people to open their lives to the Prince of Peace, Jesus Christ.

Shalom World originated from the Indian network Shalom Television, which began its broadcast in 2005 and promoted the work of local parishes as well as other faith-related programs in the Malayalam language. Shalom World, with its headquarters in Texas, USA, was established nine years later to broadcast programs in English. Shalom World is furthering its boundaries under the guidance of Rev. Dr. Roy Palatty CMI, Spiritual Director, Shalom Media. It broadcasts 24/7 high-definition, Catholic content that is faith-filled, virtue-building, character-based, and family-friendly. Shalom World has now expanded to Australia and Europe. It was launched in Australia on January 26, 2018.

For World Youth Day 2019, Shalom World was named the Official Media Partner by the Archdiocese of Panama. Through this partnership, viewers across the globe were able to participate in the largest youth event of the Church. The live broadcast of this event began on January 22 and ended on January 27.

== Streaming ==
Shalom World is a Christian TV platform that focuses on faith-based entertainment suited for all ages. Apart from faith-formation material, the content includes family entertainment such as movies, comedies, dramas, sitcoms, and children's shows. This wide range of programming can be accessed on-demand for free without a subscription. The channel can be live streamed on smart TVs; it can also be viewed through the website and a mobile application.

== Series/programs ==
- Unshackled – Shalom World, in association with iTHIRST Ministry, produces a brand new series to help those who are affected by addictions in one form or the other. The series has 12 episodes which remains an eye opener for those fighting to break the shackles of addiction. Unshackled Web Page
- Unscripted – Shalom World broadcasts content related to vocations on television. Shalom World partnered with Fr. David Michael Moses to produce a series called ‘Unscripted’, focusing on the vocation to the priesthood.
- Jesus My Savior – features individuals who have had an encounter with Jesus and want to share this experience with others.
- 40 Martyrs of England and Wales - This is a documentary that features martyrs of England and Wales. It takes you through incredible story of men and women who painted catholic history in England.
- Triumph – a show which features people who were able to achieve extraordinary feats through faith despite the challenges they faced.
- Heart Talk – a show featuring Bishops and Archbishops from across the world as they share their experiences, sacrifices, faith journeys and how they pursue holiness in everyday life.The "Heart Talk" series aims to give insights into the lives and inspirations of bishops.
- Katie & Koco – explores the lives of saints, with Caitlin Swan and Koco, the cockatoo.Through the show, they help children understand that becoming a saint is not only possible, but also necessary.
- Sing4Him – features choirs from around the world. Various choirs are invited to participate and worship the Lord.
- Real Men – focuses on the struggles of men who lead a virtuous life. Shalom World and Real Talk International presents the talk series that help men understand the amazing gift of love and relationships. The talk is hosted by Paul Ninnes and tackles engaging conversations about human sexuality in the way God designed it to be.
- WKLY with Fr. Rob –Shalom World launched a show in partnership with Fr. Rob Galea; the show is called WKLY with Fr. Rob.A Colombian musician, producer and presenter, Iván Diaz has appeared on Shalom World TV.
- Another Slice of Pizza – a collaboration with NET Australia featuring friends catching up for pizza and discussing God's intervention in their lives.
- Vital Signs – provides insight on a wide range of topics from depression to contraception. The show is hosted by CMA Board Member and Micrographic Dermatologic Surgeon, Dr. Thomas McGovern; he interviews CMA guest experts to provide vital information regarding health that is difficult to find among the vast information available on the internet.
- Teenacious – a series aimed at assisting teenagers with problems they experience throughout their teen years. Youth leaders and leaders of various ministries chat with teens to understand their challenges and help them.
- Woman: Strong Faith, True Beauty – a talk show which seeks to offer support, wisdom, and hope that Christ and the teachings of the Catholic Church can provide. With topics ranging from “How to Date with Purpose” to “Healing from Sexual Abuse”, this show advocates for issues women truly care about.
- Book.Ed – a twelve-episode series that features interviews with authors about their books. The show also brings feedback from readers who have already read the book.
- The Journal – a monthly show, focused on pilgrimage and exploring Marian Shrines all over the world. In each episode, the viewer can learn about the history, the apparition, the miracles and the location of the Shrines.
- Overcomer – broadcaster and journalist, Jo Hayes’ 30-episode series educates the audience to apply the Word of God to practical life situations and challenges. The show draws on her own experiences as well as the experiences of people she has met and talked to about physical illness, mental health, financial struggles, work problems, and relationship struggles.
- Hope Spot - Shalom World's ‘Hope Spot’ brought a panel of bishops and various experts to discuss relevant topics during the pandemic. The show featured Bishop Kevin Doran of Ireland, Fr. Dave Pivonka of the US and various others.
- Dominion - On the Shalom World original series ‘Dominion,’ with host, Robert Falzon we see how hope and faith in Jesus enables individuals to overcome the uncertainties we face during the coronavirus pandemic.

== Awards ==
- Honorable Mention in the Documentary Category: ""Glorious Lives – Angelina Lyaka 1913-1927,"" focusing on the life of a saintly Ugandan teenage girl"
- 1st Place – Television Station of the Year, Gabriel Awards 2020 (Awarded by Catholic Media Association)
- 1st Place – Religious Places - Videos promoting attendance, 'The Journal: Martyrs Shrine', Gabriel Awards 2020 (Awarded by Catholic Media Association)
- 1st Place – Best Freestanding Presentation of Online Video - 'Depiction of Religious Life, A young Priest in the World, Fr David Michael Moses, Catholic Press Awards 2022 (Awarded by Catholic Media Association)
- 2nd Place – Religious Places - Videos promoting attendance, 'Journal- National Shrine of our Lady of Good Help', Gabriel Awards 2021(Awarded by Catholic Media Association)
- 2nd Place – Best Freestanding Presentation of Online Video – Panel Discussion, Video-Panel Discussion, Catholic Press Awards 2021 (Awarded by Catholic Media Association)

== See also ==
- Catholic television
- Catholic television channels
- Catholic television networks
