= Gianni Rondolino =

Italian film critic and historian

Gianni Rondolino (13 January 1932 – 9 January 2016) was an Italian film critic and historian.

Born in Turin, Rondolino was professor of History and Criticism of Film at the University of Turin. Rondolino was the author of several essays and monographies, including books on Luchino Visconti, Roberto Rossellini, Walt Disney, Tex Avery, the magic lantern and the Turin-based silent cinema industry. He was best known for a book on the history of world cinema he released in 1977, Storia del cinema, informally known as "Il Rondolone". He founded and also directed for several years the Turin Film Festival.
