= CPBC =

CPBC may refer to:

- Caribbean Professional Baseball Confederation, organizers of the Caribbean Series club baseball tournament
- Canadian Professional Boxing Council, the sanctioning body for professional boxing in Canada
- Catholic Peace Broadcasting Corporation, a radio & television network of South Korea; see Andrew Yeom Soo-jung
- Communist Party of British Columbia
- Conservative Party of British Columbia, a provincial political party in British Columbia, Canada
- Convention of Philippine Baptist Churches
- Corpse Party: Blood Covered, a video game for the PC released in 2008
