= KIFR (TV) =

Television station in Visalia, California

- Visalia–Fresno, California; United States
- City: Visalia, California
- Channels: Digital: 22 (UHF), shared with KNXT-LD; Virtual: 49

Programming
- Affiliations: see § Subchannels

Ownership
- Owner: Vita Broadcasting

History
- First air date: November 2, 1986
- Former call signs: KNXT (1986–November 2021)
- Former channel numbers: Analog: 49 (UHF, 1986–2009); Digital: 50 (UHF, until 2018)
- Former affiliations: Religious Independent (1986–2020); Silent (2020–June 2021); Classic Arts Showcase (2021–2025, moved to DT4)

Technical information
- Licensing authority: FCC
- Facility ID: 16950
- ERP: 126 kW
- HAAT: 827.7 m (2,716 ft)
- Transmitter coordinates: 36°17′14.2″N 118°50′18.6″W

Links
- Public license information: Public file; LMS
- Website: www.vitabroadcasting.org

KIFR (channel 49) is a religious television station in Visalia, California, United States, serving the Fresno area. The station is owned by Vita Broadcasting. KIFR's studios are located on North Fresno Street near San Joaquin Memorial High School and the Hammond district just north of downtown Fresno, and its transmitter is located on Blue Ridge in rural Tulare County.

Prior to its current ownership, channel 49 (as KNXT) was a Catholic television station for the Central Valley.

== History ==
Chancery

Master Control

Studio Cameras

In 1985, the Federal Communications Commission (FCC) granted an application by the Roman Catholic Diocese of Fresno—which learned of the channel a week before the deadline to file—to build a new non-commercial educational television station on the channel 49 allocation in Visalia, beating out a bid from the Trinity Broadcasting Network and the Tulare County board of education. Construction of the transmitter on Blue Ridge proved to be a test of sensitivity; the tower required environmental approval because the site is a roosting area for the California condor, and the county approved the tower over protests by Native American groups, who argued that the ridge was sacred ground and had been used for centuries as a communication point for smoke signals between tribes on different sides of the Sierra. The station signed on November 2, 1986. (The call letters had previously had a long history in California on the CBS owned-and-operated station on channel 2 in Los Angeles, which became KCBS-TV in 1984.)

It did not take long for the diocese's new television station to be a financial drain, in part because it was approved far faster than had been anticipated, as TBN had unexpectedly withdrawn its application. In 1988, less than two years after signing on, priests called for a probe of the diocese's finances, alleging that monies donated by parishioners and entrusted to the diocese were intended for building improvements but instead diverted to diocesan operations including KNXT. That same year, on the occasion of Bishop Joseph J. Madera's quinquennial visit ad limina, the station reported a $263,000 deficit, even though the bishop noted that financial contributions were growing. A group explored a potential sale of channel 49 in 1990 and even recommended its sale to Community Educational Television, the noncommercial stations arm of TBN, for $1 million; two years later, negotiations were held with Joseph Desmond, a buyer who owned 30 KFC restaurants in the state and planned to keep Catholic programming on KNXT. Bids, however, were so low that the diocese opted to retain and upgrade the station instead. By 1996, KNXT was producing 14 in-house programs in English, Spanish and Portuguese, alongside its weekly Mass from St. Anne's Chapel and EWTN and Classic Arts Showcase programming.

=== Attempted sales, closure and resumption of operations ===
In 2016, the Diocese of Fresno attempted to sell the station, but it could not find a non-profit organization willing to buy the non-commercial educational station. It then operated in a partnership with the Massachusetts-based CatholicTV network. The diocese then revealed that it was in negotiations with a party again in early 2019, warning that if talks fell apart, the station would sign off the air. That party was revealed to be Ventura TV Video and Appliance Center, Inc., owner of KBID-LP and KVHF-LD in Fresno, when the two parties petitioned the FCC in August 2019 to remove the non-commercial reservation from KNXT's channel allocation.

On June 18, 2020, in a letter from Bishop Joseph Vincent Brennan, the diocese announced it could no longer sustain KNXT's high cost of operation and was taking it silent on June 30, after 33 years of broadcasting.

On May 3, 2021, it was announced that KNXT would be sold to fellow non-profit Vita Broadcasting for $50,000; it would remain a non-commercial educational station. The sale was completed on June 21; the station returned to the air on June 29 with Classic Arts Showcase programming. The call letters were changed to KIFR on November 8, 2021.

== Programming ==
Prior to the sale to Vita Broadcasting, programming seen on KNXT was mainly of a Roman Catholic religious orient, with some shows being sourced from the Eternal Word Television Network; however, KNXT is somewhat less conservative doctrinally (but firmly in line with Catholic Church teachings). The station's programming consisted of a mix of local daily and Sunday Mass, talk shows, music and variety programs, the Rosary, children's programs, and Catholic-targeted movies.

KNXT also carried a handful of Protestant produced programs that do not get into doctrinal issues (including children's shows), as well as some limited secular programming. The station's programming was simulcast on translator station KNXT-LP (channel 38) in Bakersfield. KNXT-LP was acquired by the Roman Catholic Diocese of Fresno from Cocola Broadcasting on November 2, 2007, to serve as a repeater of KNXT.

KNXT was the only full-power, 24-hour Catholic-owned broadcast station in the United States that is not a member station of PBS, although many other Roman Catholic dioceses around the nation provide such programming to cable or closed-circuit television systems (although other television stations, including WWL-TV in New Orleans, KDTU (now KTTU) in Tucson, Arizona, WETG (now WFXP) in Erie, Pennsylvania, WBAY-TV in Green Bay, Wisconsin, WNDU-TV in South Bend, Indiana, WTXX (now WCCT-TV) in Hartford, Connecticut, and WIHS-TV (now WSBK-TV) in Boston, have been owned by Catholic interests, all seven stations were commercial, primarily secular stations with limited Catholic programming).

KNXT satellite dishes

KNXT satellite dishes

Production studio

== Technical information ==
=== Subchannels ===
Subchannels of KIFR and KNXT-LD
License	Subchannel	Res.	Short name	Programming
KIFR	49.1	720p	DStrES	Daystar Español
KIFR	49.2	480i	ESNE	ESNE TV
KIFR	49.3	720p	DAYSTR	Daystar
KIFR	49.4	480i	ARTS	Classic Arts Showcase
KIFR	49.7	480i	Point	The Point TV
KNXT-LD	53.1	720p	MyTV53	Main KNXT-LD programming
KNXT-LD	53.7	480i	TheWalk	The Walk TV

=== Analog-to-digital conversion ===
KNXT shut down its analog signal, over UHF channel 49, on June 12, 2009, the official date on which full-power television stations in the United States transitioned from analog to digital broadcasts under federal mandate. The station's digital signal remained on its pre-transition UHF channel 50, using virtual channel 49.

=== Spectrum auction repack ===
KNXT was one of nearly 1,000 television stations that were required to change their digital channel allocation in the upcoming spectrum auction repack in late 2017 or early 2018. The station reallocated its digital signal to UHF channel 22 in phase one of the repack.

== See also ==
- Catholic television
- Catholic television channels
- Catholic television networks
