= Vatican News App =

Official Vatican mobile app for communication

- Initial release: January 23, 2013; 13 years ago
- Stable release: 7.0.4 / July 25, 2019; 6 years ago
- Operating system: Android, iOS
- Website: w2.vatican.va/content/vatican/en/apps.html

The Vatican News App is an official mobile application software issued by the Vatican's Dicastery for Communication. Formerly titled The Pope App, the app was launched on January 23, 2013, under the auspices of the Pontifical Council for Social Communications, a now-defunct dicastery that was merged into the Secretariat (now Dicastery) for Communication in March 2016.

Initially, The Pope App was available only on iOS devices, but became available for Android phones at the end of February 2013. The app is available for download on iOS and Android in five languages: English, French, Italian, Portuguese and Spanish.

It was originally promoted as an application with focus on the figure of the Pope which made it possible to follow the Pope's events while they are taking place. Alerts notified the followers by informing and offering access to "official papal-related content in a variety of formats". The app also enabled its users to see areas of the Vatican through webcams allocated throughout St. Peter's Square in Rome that broadcast images.

In early 2018, The Pope App was relaunched as the Vatican News App, accompanied by a redesign that eliminated many of the previous version's features, reducing the app to a more conventional news service, with increased emphasis on news from the Vatican and the worldwide Catholic Church and less focus on the day-to-day activities of the Pope.
