= Rodeio =

Coordinates: 26.9228°S 49.3664°W

- Municipality
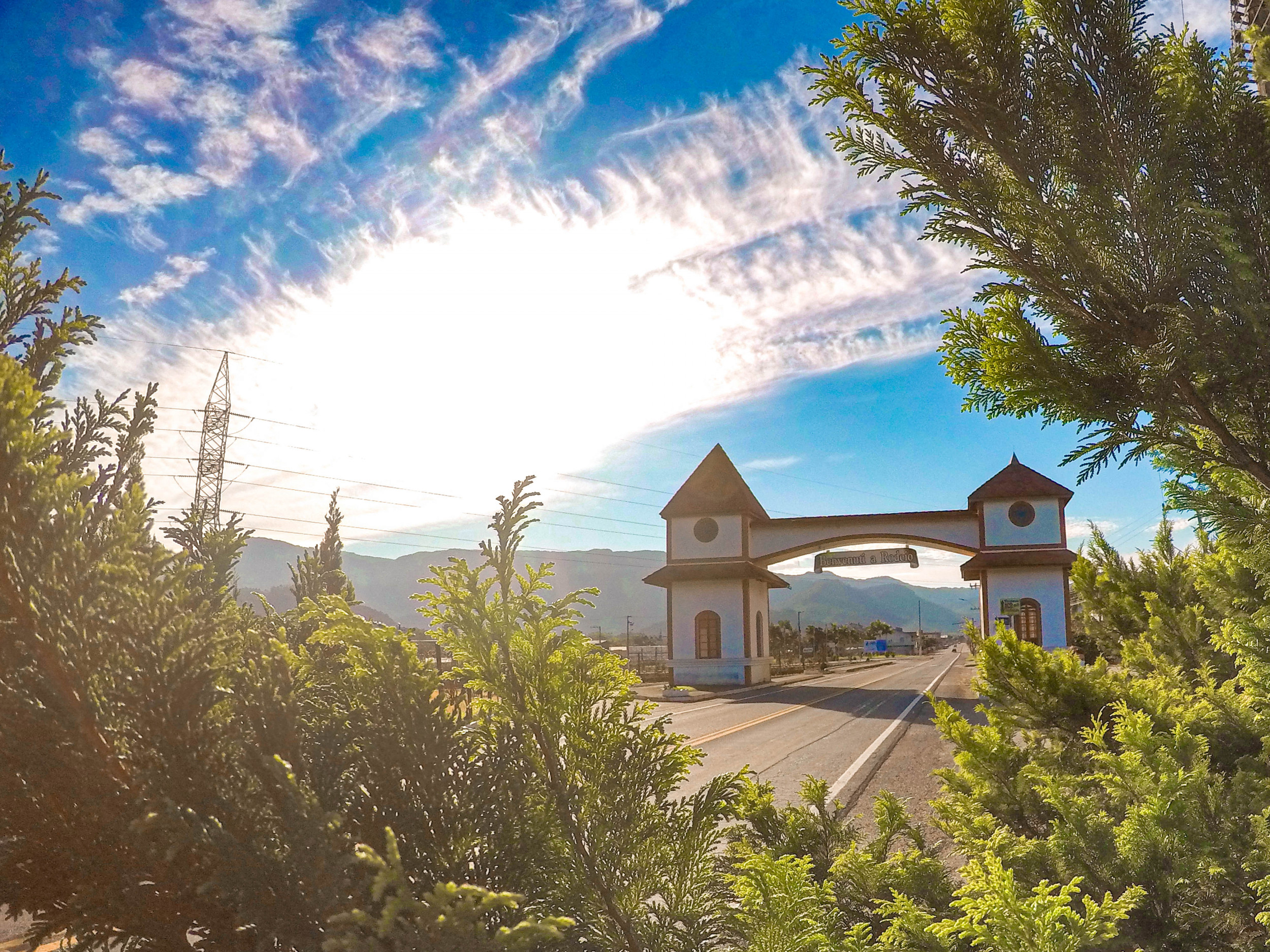
- Rodeio city gate

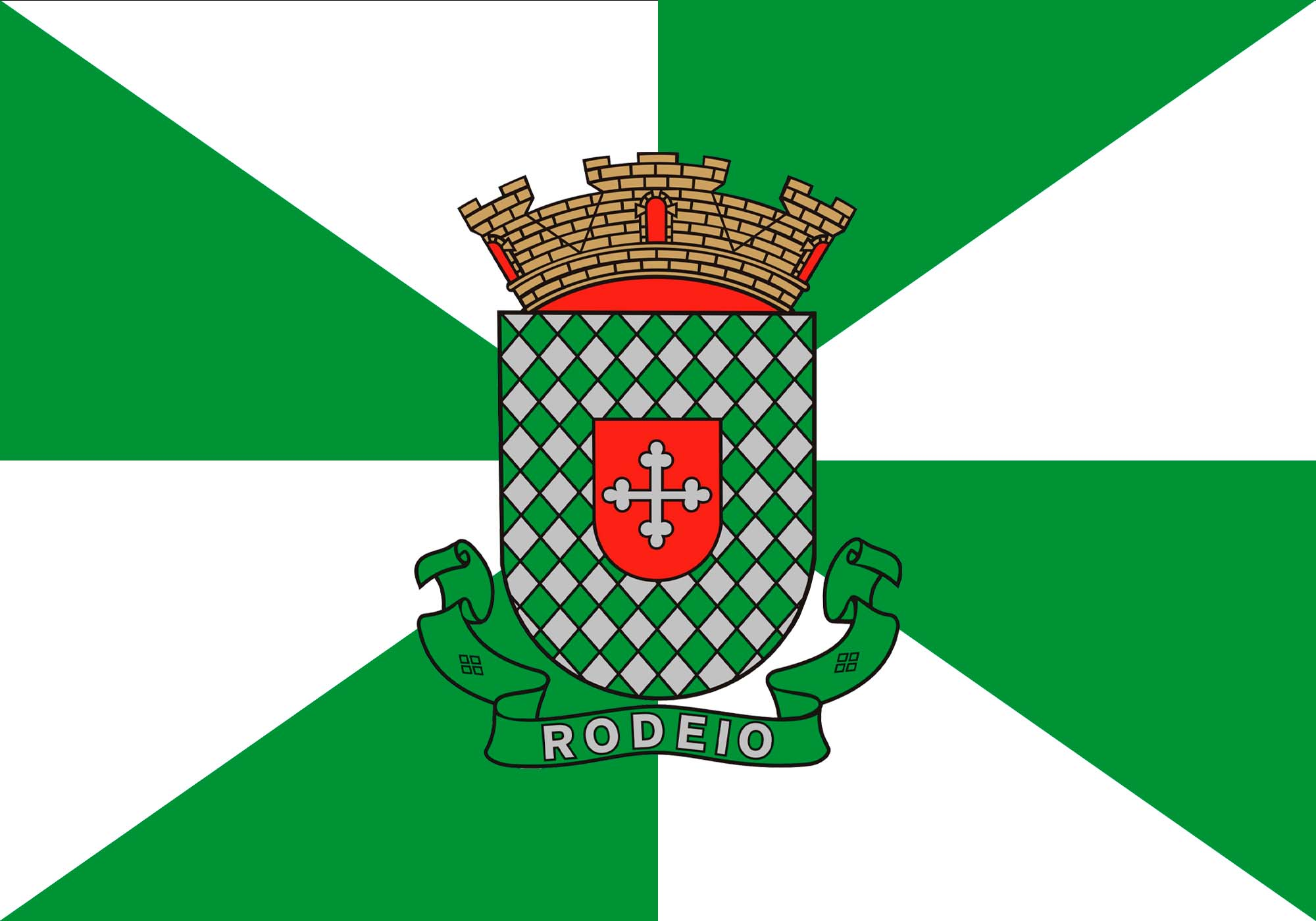
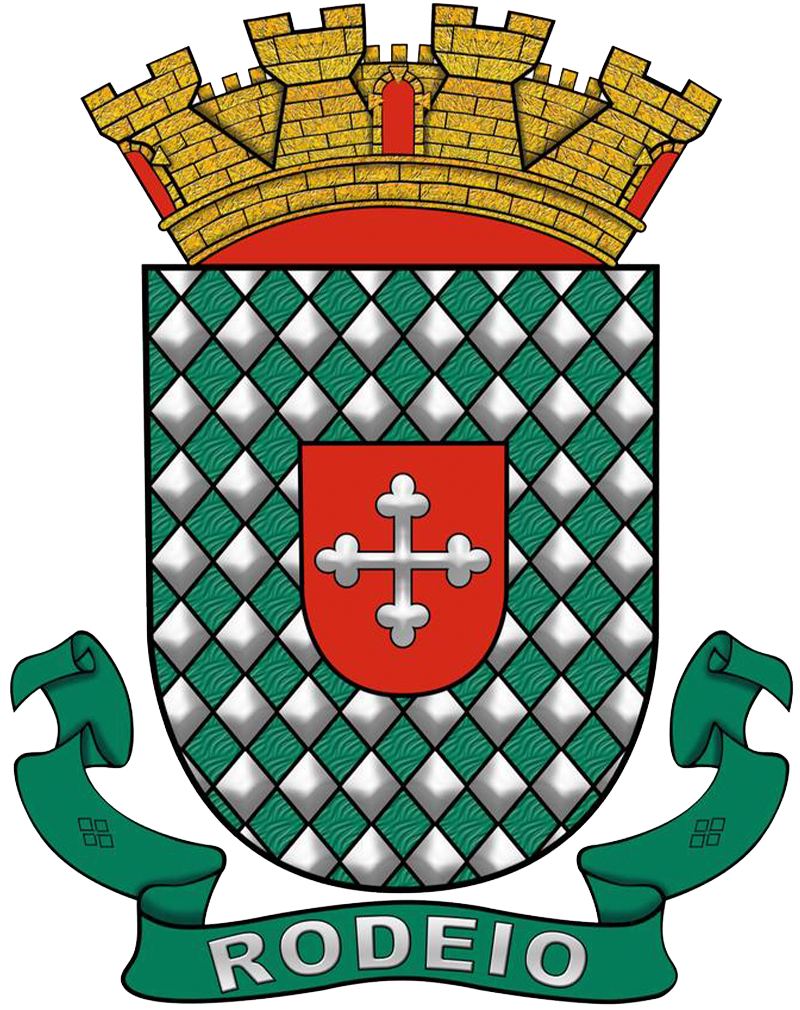
- Flag Coat of arms
- Nickname: "Vale dos Trentinos"
- Country: Brazil
- Region: South
- State: Santa Catarina
- Mesoregion: Vale do Itajai

Population (2020)
  - Total: 11,600
- Time zone: UTC -3

Rodeio is a municipality in the state of Santa Catarina in the South region of Brazil.

== See also ==
- List of municipalities in Santa Catarina
