= Octava Dies =

TV magazine show

- Genre: Magazine
- Country of origin: Vatican City
- Original languages: English; Italian

Production
- Production location: Via del Pellegrino 00120 Vatican City
- Editor: Federico Lombardi

Original release
- Network: Vatican News Services
- Release: 1998

Octava Dies is a 25-minute weekly TV magazine show, which broadcasts worldwide since Easter 1998. It is also broadcast by Italian Catholic television channels and by press agencies such as APTN. It is available in English and Italian on the Vatican's website (broadcast every Sunday at 12:30 after the Angelus).

The magazine is part of the Vatican Television Center (CTV) programs, which are transmitted by the national broadcaster of the state of Vatican City. This specific weekly program highlights the activities of Pope Leo XIV and the Holy See. Taped at the Vatican and in other places visited by the Pope in the course of his day-to-day ministry.

Vatican Central Television was first aired in 1983.
