= Padre Pio TV =

- Country: Italy
- Broadcast area: Italy, reaching bordering regions via overspill of the Italian terrestrial network
- Headquarters: Via De Nunzio 13, 71013 San Giovanni Rotondo (FG) Italy

Ownership
- Owner: Capuchin Friars of the Religious Province of Sant’Angelo

History
- Launched: 2003

Links
- Website: www.padrepio.tv

Availability

Streaming media
- LIVE Stream: Live TV Stream

Padre Pio TV, formerly known as Tele Radio Padre Pio, is a Catholic television channel belonging to the Capuchin Friars of San Giovanni Rotondo, a city in the province of Foggia, Italy, the place where lived and died the saint Padre Pio of Pietrelcina to whom the TV channel is dedicated.

== Distribution ==
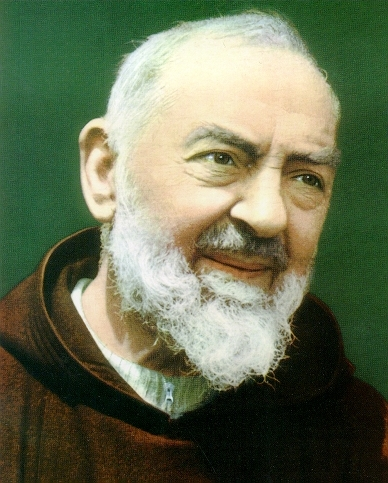
Padre Pio

Padre Pio TV programming is broadcast on digital terrestrial television systems to the entire national territory of Italy on channel position 145. Padre Pio TV is available to free-to-air satellite television viewers in Europe and the Mediterranean area via Eutelsat Hotbird 13F @ 13,0° Est Trasponder 158, in the frequency of 11,662 MHz, Transponder 158, DVB-S2 8PSK, Vertical pole, 27,500 Ms / s, 2/3, SID 16952, with the name Padre Pio TV. It also broadcasts on a radio broadcasting system to the outskirts of the province of Foggia.

Internet users can view the channel through the website padrepio.tv, or with applications for iOS or Android mobile devices.

== Programming ==
=== Religious services and devotional programs ===
A partial listing of Padre Pio TV schedule:

- Candles procession from the Sanctuary of Saint Pio of Pietrelcina
- The Angelus from the Basilica of the Holy House in Loreto
- Holy Mass from the Church of Saint Mary of Graces (San Giovanni Rotondo)
- Holy Rosary from the crypt of Church of Saint Mary of Graces (San Giovanni Rotondo)
- Chaplet of the Divine Mercy

== Patron saints ==
Our Lady of Graces (Italian: Santa Maria delle Grazie) is considered the co-patroness of Padre Pio TV. The patron saint of this Italian Catholic channel is Saint Pio of Pietrelcina.

The Italian singer and TV host Raffaella Carrà, a devotee of Padre Pio, was considered the channel's godmother.

== See also ==
- Catholic television
- Catholic television channels
- Catholic television networks
- International religious television broadcasters
- Radio Maria
- Telepace
- Vatican Media
