= KNXT-LD =

Television station in Visalia, California

- Visalia–Fresno, California; United States
- City: Visalia, California (Note: Originally licensed to Bakersfield, California; moved to Visalia in 2025.)
- Channels: Digital: 22 (UHF), shared with KIFR; Virtual: 53
- Branding: MyTV 53

Programming
- Affiliations: 53.1: Independent with MyNetworkTV; for others, see § Subchannels

Ownership
- Owner: My Central Valley, LLC

History
- Founded: February 18, 1997
- First air date: April 28, 2000
- Former call signs: K10OH (1997−January 2000); K57HZ (January−September 2000); KNXT-LP (September 2000–2021)
- Former channel numbers: Analog: 57 (UHF, 2000–2008), 38 (UHF, 2008–2015); Digital: 6 (VHF, until 2024)
- Former affiliations: Religious Independent (via KIFR, 2000–2020); Silent (2020–2021)

Technical information
- Licensing authority: FCC
- Facility ID: 16944
- Class: LD
- ERP: 126 kW
- HAAT: 827.7 m (2,716 ft)
- Transmitter coordinates: 36°17′14.2″N 118°50′18.6″W

Links
- Public license information: LMS
- Website: www.mytv53.com

KNXT-LD (channel 53) is a television station licensed to Visalia, California, United States, serving the Fresno area and owned by My Central Valley, LLC. It is programmed primarily as an independent station, but maintains a secondary affiliation with MyNetworkTV. Despite KNXT-LD legally holding a low-power license, it transmits using the full-power spectrum of KIFR (channel 49) through a channel sharing agreement, from an antenna on Blue Ridge in rural northwestern Tulare County.

== History ==
The station was started as K57HZ, originally licensed to Bakersfield and transmitting on channel 57, on April 28, 2000, by Cocola Broadcasting. Cocola sold the station to the Roman Catholic Diocese of Fresno, which owned regional Catholic station KNXT (channel 49), in 2007 for $1.4 million. It then moved to channel 38 and became a translator of KNXT, which also appeared on Bakersfield cable systems.

In 2020, the diocese shut down KNXT owing to high costs. In the case of the Bakersfield translator, a digital television conversion also needed to be conducted. KNXT, a non-commercial educational station, was sold to Vita Broadcasting and became KIFR, while a for-profit company, My Central Valley, LLC, acquired the Bakersfield translator.

As of 2025, KNXT airs live professional sports programming featuring Central Valley Fuego FC of USL League One and Visalia Rawhide of Minor League Baseball.

== Newscasts ==
KNXT simulcast sister station KMSG-LD's newscast, and offered 2 1/2 hours of news per week (30 minutes each weekday) with the San Joaquin Valley's only 8 p.m. newscast, My 53 News at 8:00, anchored by news director Austin Reed, which debuted April 1, 2022. The newscast was canceled in early 2024, soon after Reed's departure.

== Subchannels ==
Subchannels of KIFR and KNXT-LD
| License | Subchannel | Res. | Short name | Programming |
|---|---|---|---|---|
| KIFR | 49.1 | 720p | DStrES | Daystar Español |
| KIFR | 49.2 | 480i | ESNE | ESNE TV |
| KIFR | 49.3 | 720p | DAYSTR | Daystar |
| KIFR | 49.4 | 480i | ARTS | Classic Arts Showcase |
| KIFR | 49.7 | 480i | Point | The Point TV |
| KNXT-LD | 53.1 | 720p | MyTV53 | Main KNXT-LD programming |
| KNXT-LD | 53.7 | 480i | TheWalk | The Walk TV |
