= Dario Edoardo Viganò =

Italian Catholic priest and writer

The Reverend Monsignor Dario Viganò
- Prefect Emeritus of the Secretariat for Communications
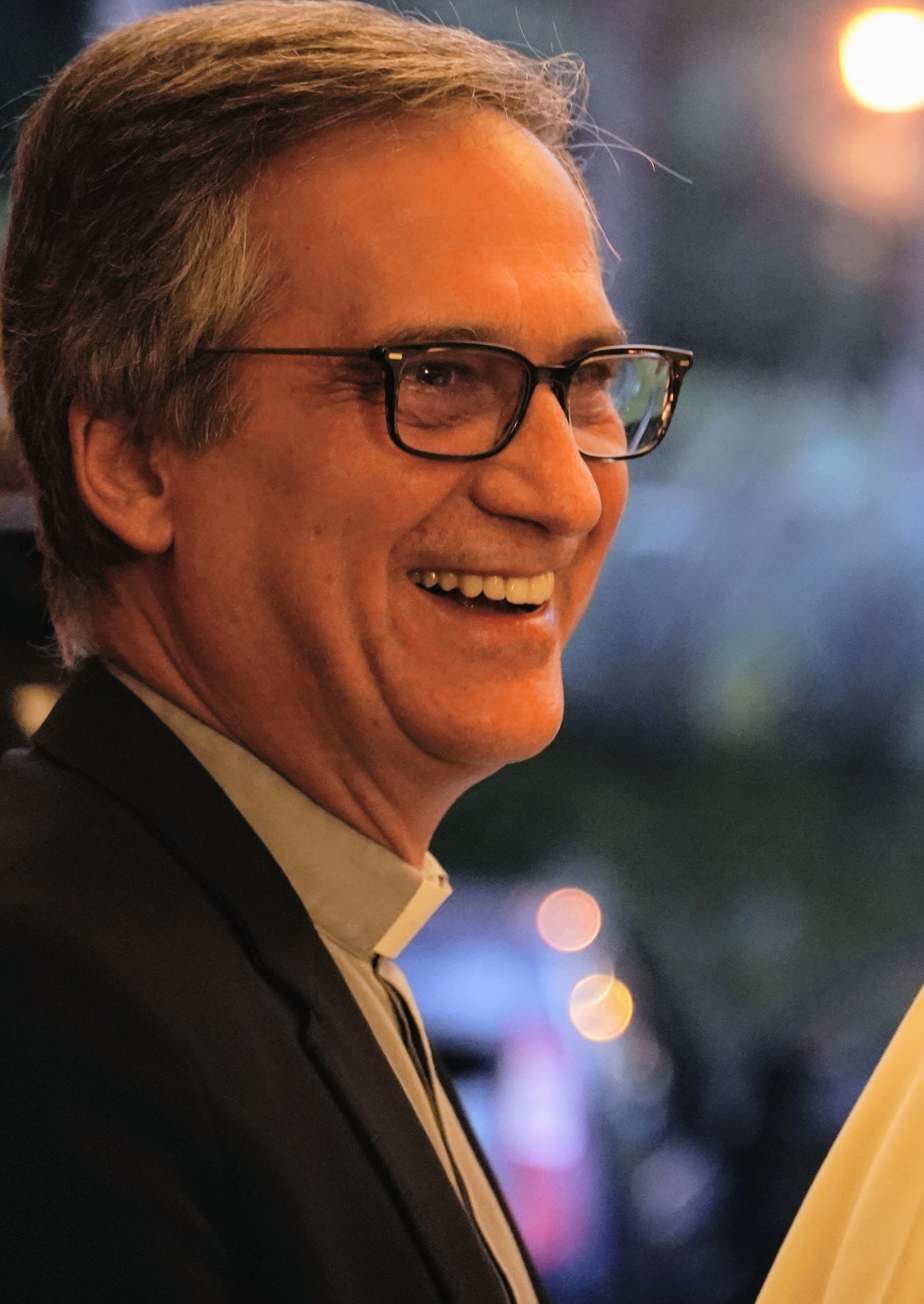
- Monsignor Dario E. Viganò in 2019.
- Church: Roman Catholic Church
- Appointed: 27 June 2015
- Term ended: 21 March 2018
- Predecessor: None; position established
- Successor: Paolo Ruffini
- Previous post: President of the Vatican Media Committee (2015-18)

Orders
- Ordination: 13 June 1987 by Carlo Maria Martini

Personal details
- Born: Dario Edoardo Viganò; 27 June 1962 (age 64) Rio de Janeiro, Brazil
- Education: Salesian Pontifical University

Dario Edoardo Viganò (born 27 June 1962) is an Italian Catholic priest, writer and university teacher. He was named Director of Vatican Television Center in 2013. He served as the first Prefect of the newly established Secretariat for Communications from 27 June 2015 to 21 March 2018, resigning "a week after his mishandling of a letter from retired Pope Benedict XVI provoked a global outcry".

== Career ==
Viganò was born 27 June 1962 in Rio de Janeiro to Italian parents. Following studies in philosophy and theology at the University of Milan, he was ordained a Roman Catholic priest on 13 June 1987 by Cardinal Carlo Maria Martini, Archbishop of Milan.

In 1997, he completed his doctorate at ISCOS, the communication institute of the Salesian Pontifical University in Rome (now the Faculty of the Sciences of Social Communication) on the theme: Chiesa e cinema. L'emblematico caso della diocesi di Milano (1894-1979). During and after his doctoral studies, he worked at the Office for Social Communications of the Milan archdiocese. He was involved primarily in the cinema and community cinema halls.

In 1998, he became a member of the Italian Episcopal Conference.

In the second half of the 1990s he taught Ethics and the Deontology of the Media at the Università Cattolica del Sacro Cuore in Milan. In 1998 he began teaching Semiology of Cinema and Audio-visual Technology in Rome and Semiotics and Business Communications at the faculty of Communication Studies at LUMSA University.

From 2000 on, he taught at the Pontifical Lateran University in Rome where he was made professor of Communication Theory and dean of the Redemptor hominis Institute. He is also Director of the Centro Interdisciplinare Lateranense, and professor at the Institute of Religious Sciences "Ecclesia Mater".

Since 2005 he has been a lecturer in Semiology of Cinema and Audiovisual Technology and Cinema Theory and Techniques at the faculty of Political Science and Communication Studies at the LUISS Guido Carli University in Rome.

He was made a member of the Pontifical Academy of Theology and of the scientific board of the Centre for Media and Communication Studies (CMCS) "Massimo Baldini". He is also a member of the scientific board of the CMCS-LUISS Working Papers Series.

On 22 January 2013 he was named director of the Vatican Television Center and secretary of its board of administration.

On 29 September 2016, Pope Francis named him a member of the Congregation for the Clergy and the Congregation for Catholic Education.

He holds the title of Knight Commander in the Equestrian Order of the Holy Sepulchre of Jerusalem, a papal order of chivalry.

== Professional ==
In 2004 Dario Edoardo Viganò was asked to assume the role of President of the Ente dello Spettacolo (EdS) a cinema organization which was founded in 1946 and which, in 2006, became the Fondazione Ente dello Spettacolo (FEdS).

He was editor-in-chief of the magazine Rivista del Cinematografo, the longest-running Italian magazine covering cinema, founded in Milan in 1928 and edited by the Fondazione Ente dello Spettacolo.

In the same period, he was nominated as a member of the Subcommittee for the recognition of Cultural Interests by the Italian Ministry of Cultural Heritage and Activities with a focus on feature films.

In 2008 he participated in the Administrative Council of the Centro Sperimentale di Cinematografia with responsibilities covering the Italian National Film Archives and publishing.

In the early 2000s Viganò was President of the Italian National Commission for Film Evaluation, an agency sponsored by the Italian Episcopal Conference (CEI). In the past ten years he has been a research assistant for the cinema division of the Office for Social Communication of the CEI, directed by Domenico Pompili.

Together with Francesco Casetti of the Catholic University of Milan, Viganò is the science co-director of an advanced e-learning program for the promotion of communication and culture known as ANICEC. It was established in 2000 by the Inter-disciplinary Centre of the Lateran Pontifical University, the Università Cattolica del Sacro Cuore, and the Communication and Culture Foundation of the CEI.

=== Resignation ===
On 27 June 2015, Pope Francis named him the Prefect of the newly established Secretariat for Communications. He was expected to give greater prominence to new media and decrease the significance of the Vatican's radio and print operations. He predicted the reorganization of existing departments would be "tear-inducing" for some of the 650 employees affected as duplicate processes were eliminated and greater coordination introduced. He also encountered institutional rivalries both within his departments and in other parts of the Roman Curia. In mid-March 2018, Viganò inaccurately represented a letter authored by Pope Emeritus Benedict XVI and provided journalists with a photograph later shown to be altered. After extensive media discussion of these misrepresentations, he resigned as prefect on 21 March 2018 and Pope Francis named him assessor of the Secretariat, its third-highest post.

== Honors ==
Vatican: Chaplain of His Holiness (10 July 2004)

Vatican: Knight Commander of the Equestrian Order of the Holy Sepulchre of Jerusalem (12 December 2009)

Italy: Knight Commander of the Order of the Star of Italy (11 January 2022)

== Books ==
• POP FILM ART. Visual culture, moda e design nel cinema italiano anni '60 e '70, (con Steve Della Casa), Edizioni Sabinae, Roma 2012.

• Cari Maestri. Da Susanne Bier a Gianni Amelio i registi si interrogano sull'importanza dell'educazione, Cittadella editrice, Assisi 2011.

• Chiesa, denaro, pubblicità. Storia e analisi degli spot dell'8x1000, Rubbettino, Soveria Mannelli (CZ), to be published in 2010.

• Il prete di celluloide. Nove sguardi d'autore, Cittadella Editrice, Assisi 2010.

• La musa impara a digitare. Uomo, media e società, Lateran University Press, Roma 2009.

• La Chiesa nel tempo dei media, Edizioni OCD, Roma 2008.

• L'adesso del domani. Raffigurazioni della speranza nel cinema moderno e contemporaneo, Effatà Editrice, Cantalupa (TO) 2007 (con G. Scarafile).

• Gesù e la macchina da presa. Dizionario ragionato del cinema cristologico, Lateran University Press, Roma 2005.

• I sentieri della comunicazione: storia e teorie, Rubbettino, Soveria Mannelli (CZ) 2003.

• Cinema e Chiesa. I documenti del Magistero, Effatà Editrice, Cantalupa (TO) 2002.

• Essere. Parola. Immagine. Percorsi del cinema biblico, Effatà Editrice, Torino 2000 (con D. Iannotta).

• La settima stanza. Un film di Márta Mészáros, Centro Ambrosiano, Milano 1997 (con C. Bettinelli).

• I mondi della comunicazione, Centro Ambrosiano, Milano 1997 (con M. L. Bionda, A. Bourlot).

• I figli e la televisione, In dialogo, Milano 1996 (con M. L. Bionda, G. Michelone).

• I preti del cinema. Tra vocazione e provocazione, Istituto di Propaganda Libraria, Milano 1995 (con E. Alberione).

• Cinema, cinema, cinema. Dalle origini ai nostri giorni, Edizioni Paoline, Milano 1995 (con G. Michelone).

• La televisione in famiglia. Trasmissioni a confronto, Edizioni Paoline, Milano 1995 (con G. Michelone).

• Il teleforum. Domande e risposte sul piccolo schermo, Edizioni Paoline, Milano 1994 (con G. Michelone).

Catholic Church titles
New office	Prefect of the Secretariat (later Dicastery) for Communications; 2015–2018	Succeeded by Paolo Ruffini
