= Telepace =

- Country: Italy
- Broadcast area: Europe, Australia and New Zealand
- Headquarters: Cerna (VR), Italy

Programming
- Languages: Italian, English, French
- Picture format: 16:9 (1080i, HDTV); 4:3 (576i, SDTV)

History
- Launched: 1979

Links
- Website: TELEPACE

Availability

Terrestrial
- DTT: Verona (14), Veneto e Lombardia (187), Trentino-Alto Adige/Südtirol (13), Emilia Romagna (94), Roma (73 e 214 HD)

Telepace is an Italy-based broadcasting network that carries Roman Catholic-themed programming. Established in 1979, the network also includes programming from Centro Televisivo Vaticano. Its headquarters are in Cerna, a frazione of Sant'Anna d'Alfaedo, Italy, with branches in Trento, Agrigento, Lodi, Fátima, and Jerusalem.

== Broadcasting ==
It broadcasts in Italy on DTT over various mux, while it is available FTA in the United States on Glorystar and Spiritcast, and in Australia on UBI World TV. On satellite television, Telepace also broadcasts via TV Syndication in Italy with over 50 network affiliates.

Beginning in 2014, Telepace has been airing in high definition on Eutelsat HotBird satellites and on SKY Italia and Tivù Sat. The SD version was dropped from HotBird the same day. Up to now, native HD programs only occur during live telecasts from Vatican City distributed by the Centro Televisivo Vaticano, and during repeats of the above.

On 17 August 2021 the channel left satellite Hot Bird 13B and continues on Optus D2 at 152°East 12519 MHz V, Sr 22500 3/4 MPEG-2 SD.

== See also ==
- Catholic television
- Catholic television channels
- Catholic television networks
- Vatican Media
- Padre Pio TV
- Radio Maria
