= Vatican Media =

National broadcaster of the Holy See

- Country: Vatican City
- Founded: 1983 by Pope John Paul II
- Headquarters: Vatican City State
- Owner: The Holy See
- Key people: Stefano D'Agostini, Director
- Former names: Centro Televisivo Vaticano (1983–2017)
- Webcast: Vatican Media Live
- Language: English, Italian, Spanish, French, Portuguese, German, Polish, and Arabic

Vatican Media, formerly Centro Televisivo Vaticano (lit. 'Vatican Television Centre') from 1983 to 2017, is the national broadcaster of the Holy See. It first aired in 1983 and is based in Vatican City.

== Overview ==
Created in 1983 by Pope John Paul II, Vatican Media has been legally associated with Vatican City since November 1996. Its main goal is the universal expansion of Catholicism by creating television content and broadcasting images of the pope and of Vatican activities.

== Organization ==
=== Directors ===
- Archives director, John Patrick Foley: 1984–1989
- Emilio Rossi: 1989–2008
- Claudio Maria Celli: since 26 May 2009

=== General directors ===
- Giovanni Marra: 1984 – 7 June 1986
- Ugo Moretto: May 1997 – June 2001
- Federico Lombardi: 11 July 2001 – 22 January 2013
- Dario Edoardo Viganò: 22 January 2013 – 21 December 2015
- Stefano D’Agostini: since 21 December 2015

=== Administrative secretaries ===
- Antonio Mandelli: 1988–2001
- Roberto Romolo: since 2001

== Programs ==
Programs are mainly based on what happens in the Vatican. Daily prayers such as Angelus, general audiences on Wednesdays, and various celebrations are broadcast. The pope's travels around the world are also broadcast. Each year, it broadcasts around 130 events in the Vatican and covers daily public activities of the pope, as well as his main activities outside the Vatican.

Octava Dies is a weekly magazine of 25 minutes, broadcast in the entire world since Easter 1998. It is also broadcast by Italian Catholic television channels and by press agencies such as APTN. It is available in English and Italian on the Vatican's website (broadcast every Sunday at 12:30 after the Angelus).

== Broadcast (Vatican Television Center) ==
Live broadcasts are made on the Vatican's website and by other Italian Catholic television channels such as Telepace or TV2000, and foreign television channels such as EWTN and KTO. The Vatican does not have its own television station.

Vatican Media Live broadcasts can also be found on most of the official Vatican News YouTube channels:

- Vatican Media Live (Original sound no commentary)
- Vatican Media Live - English
- Vatican Media Live - Italian
- Vatican Media Live - Spanish
- Vatican Media Live - French
- Vatican Media Live - Portuguese
- Vatican Media Live - Portuguese (Brazilian)
- Vatican Media Live - German
- Vatican Media Live - Polish
- Vatican Media Live - Arabic

Vatican Media provides images to other television channels of events in the Vatican itself or papal activities around the world. Within Vatican City, it assists in organizing press centers and press conferences, and it also provides for special reporters and audio-video services for foreign television channels. "It conducts around 130 live broadcasts per annum, produces documentaries, creates a weekly magazine program called Octava Dies that is distributed internationally, and serves as an archival facility for all of its footage. On Sundays, the station uses Intelsat to broadcast the pope's Angelus to the United States."

== Production ==
Vatican Media produced many documentaries during the reigns of Pope John Paul II and Pope Benedict XVI. It made documentaries on the lives of the popes, on the Vatican City, and on the main churches of Catholicism. They were mainly broadcast in Italian but also in English, Spanish, French and other languages.

== Archive center ==
Vatican Media owns a library of more than 10,000 recordings, amounting to 4,000 hours of recordings and images of Pope John Paul II's reign since 1984. This library is open to foreign television channels and documentary producers from throughout the world. The Vatican Media Center is open Monday to Saturday from 9 a.m. to 1 p.m.

== Logos ==
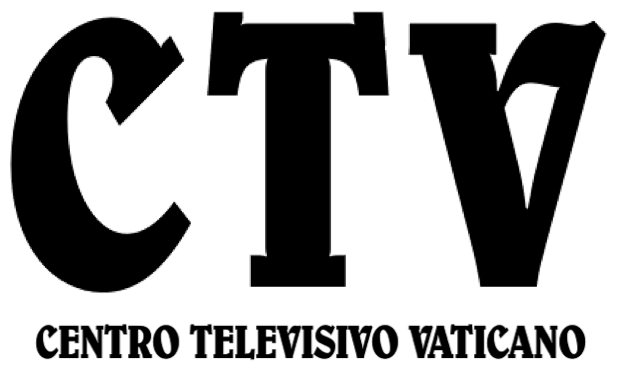
Logo in use from 22 October 1983 to 28 June 2011.

== See also ==
- Catholic television
- Index of Vatican City–related articles
- L'Osservatore Romano
- Vatican News
- Vatican Radio
- Padre Pio TV
- Radio Maria
- Telepace
