= SIGNIS =

Catholic communications organization

- Formation: World Assembly OCIC and Unda in Rome 2001
- Type: International Non-Profit Organisation
- Headquarters: Brussels, Belgium
- Location: 90 countries in 6 World Regions
- Members: 113 members; 5 associate members
- Official languages: English, French, Spanish
- Secretary General: Peter Rachada Monthienvichienchai (Thailand)
- President: Helen Osman (USA)
- Vice-President: María José Centurión (Paraguay)
- Vice-President: Paul Samasumo (Zambia)
- Ecclesiastical Assistant: Fr Pedro Sanchez (Spain)
- Website: www.signis.world

SIGNIS (official name: World Catholic Association for Communication) is a Roman Catholic ecclesial movement of the Faithful for professionals in the communication media, including press, radio, television, cinema, video, media education, internet, and new technology. It is a non-profit organization with representation from over 100 countries. It was formed in November 2001 by the merger of International Catholic Organization for Cinema and Audiovisual (OCIC) and International Catholic Association for Radio and Television (Unda). At its World Congress in Quebec in 2017, SIGNIS welcomed also former member organisations of the International Catholic Union of the Press (UCIP).

The word SIGNIS (always in uppercase) is a combination of the words SIGN and IGNIS (Latin for "fire"). It is not an acronym.

The Holy See has officially recognized SIGNIS as an International Association of the Faithful and has included the "World Catholic Association for Communication, also known as SIGNIS" in its Directory of International Associations of the Faithful, published by the Pontifical Council for the Laity. Before the dissolution of the Pontifical Council for Social Communications, the governing body of SIGNIS included a representative of this pontifical council, another department of the Roman Curia. OCIC, Unda, and SIGNIS had also members and consultors in the Pontifical Council of Social Communications. In June 2015, Pope Francis established a new dicastery of the Roman Curia with authority over all communications offices of the Holy See and the Vatican City State, including the Pontifical Council for Social Communications, Holy See Press Office, Vatican Internet Service, Vatican Radio, Vatican Television Center, Osservatore Romano, Vatican Press (it), Photograph Service, and Vatican Publishing House. A representative of this new Secretariat for Communications is part of the governing body of SIGNIS.

SIGNIS has consultative status with UNESCO, the Economic and Social Council of the United Nations, in Geneva and New York City and the Council of Europe.

== Mission ==
SIGNIS is a worldwide network working in media, with the aim of alerting Christians to the importance of human communication in every culture, and encouraging them to speak out in this sector. SIGNIS, which represents Catholic media in all the governmental and nongovernmental organizations and institutions, is committed to lobbying for policies to encourage communications that respect Christian values, justice and human rights; to involving media professionals in the dialogue on questions of professional ethics, and to fostering ecumenical and interfaith cooperation in the media sector.

The Mission of SIGNIS is: "To engage with media professionals and support Catholic Communicators to help transform our cultures in the light of the Gospel by promoting Human Dignity, Justice and Reconciliation."

== History ==
The Catholic Church has a long history of engagement with the media of communications, from the liturgy itself, in manuscripts and print publishing, in painting, architecture, and music. But with the emergence and spread of new popular media in the latter half of the 19th century, the Church faced new challenges. Already in the 19th century, Catholics considered the press, and in the 20th century, cinema and radio, to be powerful modern popular media that could influence worldviews and moral values. Many Catholics, including Pope Gregory XVI and Pope Pius IX, did not trust modernity, and the popular media were no exception. Gregory XVI published in 1832 his encyclical Mirari Vos (On Liberalism and Religious Indiffertism) that "Experience shows, even from earliest times, that cities renowned for wealth, dominion, and glory perished as a result of this single evil, namely immoderate freedom of opinion, license of free speech, and desire for novelty. Here We must include that harmful and never sufficiently denounced freedom to publish any writings whatever and disseminate them to the people, which some dare to demand and promote with so great a clamor. We are horrified to see what monstrous doctrines and prodigious errors are disseminated far and wide in countless books, pamphlets, and other writings which, though small in weight, are very great in malice." In fact, they blamed them for the declining influence of religion in society. Modernity did not simply introduce technological and scientific innovations; it enabled the dissemination of new ideologies, based mostly on atheism and challenging the place of the Church in society. Pope Pius IX in 1864 condemned modernity, liberalism, and "pestilential books, pamphlets and newspapers". However, Pope Leo XIII wanted to build a bridge between the Church and the modern world and started to promote Thomism, the theology based on that of Thomas Aquinas in an attempt to see if it might help to solve modern problems. In 1888, Leo XIII wrote that unconditional freedom of speech and publication could be tolerated. Later on, in the 1920s, Pope Pius XI encouraged the growth of Catholic Action: professional Catholics working and acting in the secular world including that of the modern media.

As a fruit of the contemporary Catholic Action, UCIP was founded in Belgium in 1927. A year later, the Office Catholique Internationale du Cinéma (OCIC) came into being in The Netherlands, and the Bureau Catholic International de Radiodiffusion (BCIR) in Germany. In 1946, BCIR became the international professional Catholic association for radio and television, Unda.

OCIC, Unda, and UCIP had similar objectives: to bring together Catholics already working as professionals in the media (OCIC in the field of cinema, Unda in radio and television, and UCIP in the press). The interest of Catholics in the press and especially in the new media was understandable. They saw the opportunities offered by the mass media to present their views and opinions on life and the world and so they naturally became involved in promoting education and values.

These professional Catholic lay associations, working in the world of the professional media, wanted to unite their efforts against the secularization of society and were thus working in the secular world. On the one hand, they were aware that the press and the new media of radio and cinema were contributing to secularization. On the other hand, they also believed that by engaging in these media, and above all the secular media, they could use them as a new means of evangelization. Efforts had to be made to evangelize the secular mass media, or at least to insert the values of the Gospel into them.

As a result of the merger of the Catholic media organizations OCIC and Unda, SIGNIS was founded in 2001. The archives of OCIC and Unda are located in the Documentation and Research Centre for Religion, Culture, and Society, KADOC, at the Catholic University of Louvain (KU Leuven). In 2014, the Vatican suggested that SIGNIS should also integrate the members of the former International Catholic Union of the Press (UCIP), which a few years earlier had lost its recognition by the Holy See as an official Catholic organization. At the SIGNIS World Congress of 2017 in Quebec, several Catholic press associations, former members of UCIP, were welcomed, among them CPA (Catholic Press Association of the United States and Canada).

=== Catholics and cinema ===
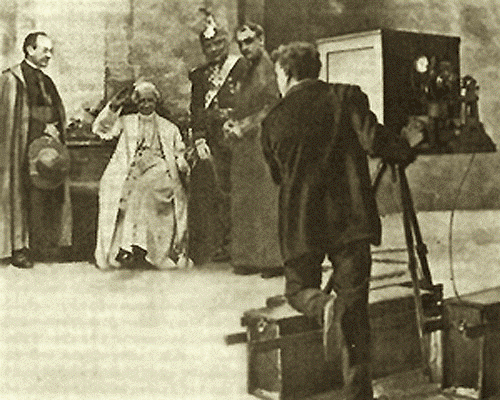
In 1898, W.K.L. Dickson cinematographed Pope Leo XIII in the gardens of the Vatican. It was the first time that a Pope had been filmed.

Catholics were involved in the new art of cinema from its inception. In November 1895, the Catholic University of Louvain organised a screening of the Auguste and Louis Lumière films. In April–May 1898, the Englishman William Kennedy-Laurie Dickson of the American Mutoscope and Biograph Company cinematographed Pope Leo XIII in the gardens of the Vatican. It was the first time that a Pope appeared before a film camera and blessed it (and the spectators). Later when cinema became a regular and popular medium, Catholics, and above all the parish priests, reacted in two ways: condemning it or considering it as a tool of evangelisation with worldwide influence on families and, above all, on young audiences. In several countries worldwide, priests started to use cinema as part of their apostolate. Among them, there was the Jesuit priest, known as Abbé Joseph Joye in Switzerland. Before the arrival of cinema, he projected images with a magic lantern for schoolchildren, and from 1902 on, he used cinema.

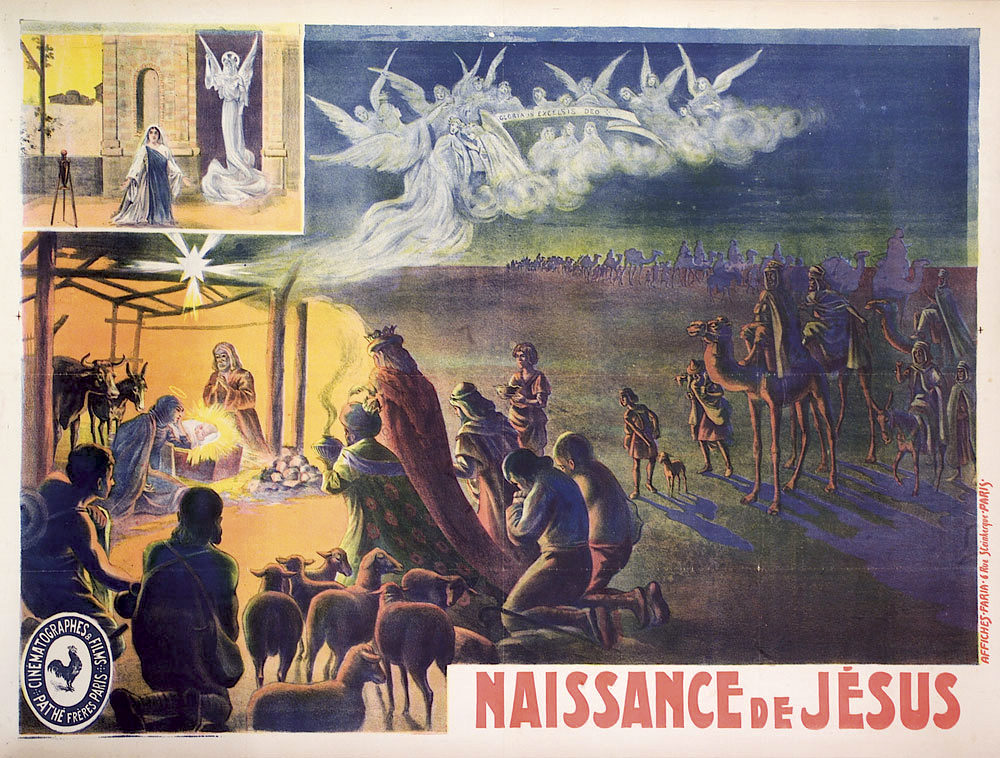
Early film producers like Pathé Frères found also inspiration in the Bible and in religions.

Early film producers like Pathé Frères found also inspiration in the Bible and in religions. In early 1907, an American film magazine published that from a modest beginning six or seven years earlier the films of the Passion of Jesus Christ became more and more popular every Lent, and were among the most expensive productions in the whole film world. It wrote also that in these years in the US, most films of the Passion were coming from France and Great Britain. From 1910 on, almost every Belgian city had its Catholic cinema (called mostly Family cinema, or Patria). In these cinema halls, educational as well as entertainment films were on the programme, and the selection and screening were controlled by the organizers, mostly priests.

One of the Belgian pioneers was Abbé Abel Brohée, who was active in the Catholic Action Movement and began to bring order to these Catholic initiatives. By the 1920s, he was convinced that it was necessary to inform the public of the moral value of films. His aim was not to limit the action of Catholics to moral quotations. He wanted a presence "on all fronts". That is why, as early as 1921, he joined a group of Catholics who had founded a distribution agency under the name Brabo-Films. He became one of the leading personalities, as president of OCIC in the 1930s, in the field of cinema. OCIC itself was the result of international politics.

In 1919, the League of Nations was established in Geneva with the objective to prevent another world war by promoting a culture of peace and dialogue. This was not only a matter of politicians and diplomats but also and a matter of the cultural world. In 1922, a technical committee for culture, the International Committee on Intellectual Cooperation (CICI), was formed, with personalities like Marie Curie, Albert Einstein, Gabriela Mistral, and Henri Bergson, to shape the mind of the members of the League of Nations, for example, toward rectifying errors in text books which were alleged to be a mainspring of racial prejudices. Out of this committee came a permanent organisation to study the development of cinema as a tool of education. Only member states and international organisations were admitted to this organization. In 1926, the International Union of Catholic Women's Leagues (UILFC – since 1952, the World Union of Catholic Women's Organisations, WUCWO) urged Catholics involved in cinema to build an international Catholic cinema organisation in order to have a say in the international film work of the League of Nations. This led to the founding of OCIC in 1928 with its first secretary general the French canon Joseph Reymond, who also became the secretary of the International Educational Cinematographic Institute (IECI) of the League of Nations. It was a way to counter the influence of those who had a negative attitude towards the Catholic world.

OCIC developed a complex but largely positive approach to this new art. It wanted to offer guidance to audiences and to discover and foster productions which promoted the same values as Christians did. It wanted to inform lay Catholics and others, in a professional way, about the moral and artistic quality of films, so that they could decide themselves if they would go and see a film or not. It was the beginning of film education. OCIC called for the creation of national organizations dealing with topics such as childhood, families, spirituality, religion and cinema, and film reviews (an early form of media education). It also expressed its intention to collaborate with the film industry. One of its concerns was the promotion of 'good' films, both for education and entertainment. This was one of the aspects put forward by the Encyclical Letter of Pope Pius XI on the Motion Picture Vigilanti Cura, published in 1936. The dominant perspective in this encyclical was cautious, defensive, and moralising, following the approach of the Legion of Decency which had been founded by the US Catholic Church to launch a crusade against the "abuses" of the motion pictures. After the Second World War, the Vatican began to move closer to the approach taken by OCIC in the matters of cinema.

While Unda was much more involved in its development with specifically Catholic production for Catholic audiences, OCIC soon realised that film production was beyond the funds and technical abilities of its members. There were some hopes and flirtations with production in the early 1930s, especially in the Netherlands, but the members and leadership of OCIC saw that their work was in collaboration in promoting exhibition, distribution, review, and critical writing on cinema.

During canon Jean Bernard's presidency (1947–1972), the writing and reviews continued but the main development was the establishing of juries at international film festivals, in collaboration with the directors and boards of the festivals, beginning at the Brussels International film festival in 1947, and a year later at the Venice Film Festival. The OCIC jury at Cannes began in 1952. This enabled OCIC to develop its criteria for its awards over these years. One difficulty which emerged was a clash of perspectives on occasion with the decisions of the US Legion of Decency which had been set up (even with an oath of loyalty) by the American bishops in 1934, the time of the enforcement of the Motion Picture Code for all American film production. In the 1950s, the Americans indicated that some films which had won OCIC awards were rated Objectionable or Condemned by the Legion and were concerned at this difference in moral perspective. The philosophy behind the Legion of Decency was not influential in Europe, although the work of the Legion was acknowledged positively by Pius XI in his encyclical letter, Vigilanti Cura, 1936. Then with changes in what could be portrayed on screen and how it could be portrayed, Fr. Bernard had to face a controversy concerning the OCIC prize at the Venice Film Festival in 1968, which resulted in discussions with Church authorities and the Vatican. The jury gave its prize to Pier Paolo Pasolini, avowed Communist, though winner of the 1964 award for his The Gospel According to St. Matthew, for his film, Teorema. The controversy was inflamed by another spark when the Berlin International Film Festival 1969 award went to John Schlesinger's Oscar winner for Best Picture, Midnight Cowboy. This meant that after forty years of activity, OCIC was able to survive controversy, articulate its aims and objectives, and establish itself as what might be called a 'consciousness organisation' within the Catholic Church. It did not set itself up as a censoring board (which many assume still when hearing that the Catholic church has a cinema organization). Later some of its members nationally or regionally were part of the work of the Bishops Conference, offering reviews, classifications, and advice which depended for its authority more on the Bishops rather than OCIC.

Preservation of film also became a concern. The consequences for OCIC in terms of policy and power was that it could not be described as a 'sacristy' organization. Later, a succinct description of how OCIC saw its scope (as the president, Fr. Peter Malone, put forward at the audience with John Paul II at the time of the merger of Unda and OCIC in SIGNIS), as both supporting Catholics who work in cinema and being a bridge between the Catholic Church and the professional world of cinema. While explicitly religious films are appreciated, OCIC came to realize that well-made films grounded in humanity made the most impact – a policy of seeing 'Christ in the Marketplace'. The image of the marketplace was later embraced by John Paul II, referring to Paul's mixed hearing in the Athens marketplace, the Areopagus (Acts of the Apostles, 17), that media is the 'new Areopagus'. This policy has guided OCIC and the film work of SIGNIS over the decades, leading to the presence of OCIC juries at world film festivals, national OCIC cinema awards, publications on the cinema of different nations (especially from Africa), movie reviews in publications and online, promotion of particular films, dialogue with directors and filmmakers, and offering advice on the release of films with particular Catholic interest or controversies (from The Da Vinci Code to Antichrist).

From the 1930s on, the Vatican began to have a closer interest in cinema. With the letter of Pius XI in 1936, Vigilanti Cura, the official teaching of the Church on cinema was positive (even though the document began 'With vigilant care'). Amongst the ideas put forward by Pius XI was one that would challenge philosophers and theologians, that cinema teaches the majority of men and women more effectively than abstract reasoning (no.23). Just over twenty years later, Pius XII issued the Encyclical letter Miranda prorsus (1957) where he urged his readers to learn how to understand and appreciate how film works. One might say that he is urging people to move on from being literate, literacy, to being visuate, visuacy (no. 57, though the terminology is this author's rather than the Pope's). In 1971, a fuller document on communications and media following the Second Vatican Council and its Declaration on Social Communications, Inter mirifica (1963), spoke about the spirituality dimensions to be found in cinema (Communio et Progressio, 1971, nos 142–144). Dialogue was a significant feature of the writings of Paul VI, from his first Encyclical, Ecclesiam suam (His Church), 1964, to Evangelii nuntiandi (Announcing the Good News), 1975.

==== OCIC's periodicals (1937–2001) ====
In March 1937, the first Newsletter of OCIC was published in Brussels. It was only in French. It was mimeographed and produced in the office and the first issue counted five pages send by post to the members and other stakeholders. Although it was not in German, the newsletter Informations de l'OCIC had also a German title Mitteilungen des Internationales Katholischen Filmbüro. When the war started in Belgium in May 1940, the publication didn't continue. It was picked up in November 1944 by Felix Morlion as "Les Formations de l'OCIC". "Bulletin of the OCIC – Office Catholique International du Cinema – International Catholic Office for Film Affairs – Continuation of the Bulletin" formerly published at 6 rue Traverstière, Brussels". Only a few issues were published and the last came out in 1947 when the situation in Belgium had become normal.

In 1949, the International Film Review (English Edition) and Revue Internationale du Cinéma (French Edition) was launched under the direction of André Ruszkowski and published in Luxemburg. Later, a Spanish edition was published in Madrid Revista Internacional del Cine containing not the same articles as in its French and English edition. A German edition began at Trier in 1951. This important illustrated publication, directed after the departure of Ruszkowski by Pierre d'André and then by the Jesuit Emmanuel Flipo in Paris, reached more than 170 issues. In the first years, it became worldwide an eye opener for the professional film world and film journalists and film historians. It gave a lot of attention to non-American cinema: European, Asian, and Latin American. In 1955, it published a special issue dedicated to filmology, which was at that time, a new way of approaching film analysis. In 1948, the OCIC board members met the founder of filmology in Paris Gilbert Cohen-Séat at the Venice Film Festival. In 1973, through lack of funds, OCIC reverted to its bulletin OCIC Information published in French, Spanish, and English – which had then existed already more than twenty years.

After an issue 0 published in July 1952, OCIC did launch at the end of that year for the second time Informations of OCIC, the result of a decision taken at the General Committee of OCIC at its Madrid meeting. There was obviously the International Film Review, but this was the magazine which was mostly directed to the secular film world and to make clear that Catholic professionals were contributing and developing in a positive way to the international film culture. It needed a contact or an intern bulletin between the General Secretariat and its members, the national Catholic film centers. An information bulletin which was focussed upon the life and activities of OCIC itself containing reports on the international and national meetings, activities, discussions, and so on. It was also published in French and Spanish. The aim was to bring together the activities of the members, and the representation of the organisation in the secular world such as UNESCO, Council of Europe, ECOSOC, and the United Nations, and the collaboration with the other international Catholic organisations such as Pax Christi or BICE. It was also mimeographed and produced in the office.

In 1979, the new secretary-general Robert Molhant started again a quarterly magazine called first OCIC-Info in different language versions: French, English, and Spanish, illustrated and printed on their own printing machine – offset press in Brussels. First transforming the internal bulletin into an international periodical for internal and external use. In 1988, it changed its name into CINE-MEDIA and gradually it became a trilingual international quarterly magazine. It wanted to show the world OCIC activities – of the General Secretariat and its members – and reflections on cinema in the secular world. The need to have a new internal bulletin was felt and OCIC info did appear once more. It existed till the end of 2001, the moment OCIC merged with Unda into SIGNIS.

==== General Secretariat – Location ====
In 1928, OCIC was founded in the Dutch city The Hague (Den Haag). The first secretary general was Rev. Reymond who got the secretariat established in Paris. In 1933, the secretariat moved from Paris to Leuven (Belgium) where the new president Brohée and the new secretariat Bernard were. Two years later, the staff moved to Brussels to the Rue Traversière. This office was occupied from 1940 to 1944 and after the war, it was the new secretary general Yvonne de Hemptinne who integrated the secretariat in her home at the rue de l'Orme, also in Brussels from 1946 to 1996, where it had to be abandoned due to expropriation and the project of the government to demolish the building for a new construction (which was not done until 2018). Between 1996 and 2001, the secretariat found a home in a Catholic school also in Brussels, rue Saphir, where it got a whole wing of four floors and an enormous basement to its disposal.

==== General Assemblies (World Congress) of OCIC and its international studydays ====
- 1928: La Haye: Foundation of the International Catholic Office for Cinema
- 1929: Munich: With the BCIR first international Congress, the General Assembly of OCIC
- 1933: Brussels: With the Belgian Centre Catholic d'Action Cinématogrpahique (CCAC), reorganisation of the international organisation with international studydays
- 1938: Vienna: Cancelled because of the international political situation – the Anschluss of Austria by Nazi Germany – because the OCIC was anti-Nazi
- 1947: Brussels: World Congress of OCIC with international study days theme on Catholic Action in Cinema considered in the light of the teachings of the encyclical Vigilanti Cura
- 1950: Rome: International study days on spiritual values in the film profession
- 1951: Luzern: International study days on Christian film critic
- 1952: Madrid: International study days on Film education
- 1953: Malta: International study days on Cinema and the Missions
- 1954: Cologne: International study days on the moral classification of films
- 1955: Dublin: International study days on the distribution and the influence of the moral classification of films
- 1957: Havana: World Congress with International study days on the promotion of good films by film associations
- 1958: Paris: International study days on the promotion of good films for a broad public
- 1960: Vienna: International study days on cinema, youth, and the government
- 1962: Montréal: World Congress with Unda and international studydays on creators of films and television productions
- 1964: Venice: International study days on cinematographic exhibition and its function towards the audience
- 1966: Cuernavaca: International study days at Ivan Illich's center – CIDOC (Centro Intercultural de Documentación), on the apostolat of cinema in the light of the Second Vatican Council
- 1967: Berlin: International study days during the Berlin International Film Festival with Interfilm – the international Protestant organisation for film – on Communication creation, the sacred and cinema, the visualisation of the relations man and women in the film, and the film for and with children
- 1968: Beirut: World Congress of OCIC with International study days on Cinema at the service of evangelisation
- 1971: Gwatt: International and interconfessionnal (with Interfilm) meeting in Switzerland on short films and audiovisual programmes at the service of the Christian message
- 1972: Deauville: World Congress of OCIC with study days on cinema and the human development; the name of OCIC is changed into International Catholic 'Organisation' for Cinema
- 1975: Petrópolis: World Congress of OCIC with international study days on cinema as a communication instrument between human beings.
- 1977: Munich: World Congress with international study days on cinema as a means of human promotion and the encounter between cultures.
- 1980: Manilla: World Congress of OCIC with international study days on cultural and social influence of foreign films
- 1983: Nairobi: World Congress of OCIC with the common OCIC–Unda international study days on communication and human promotion, the challenges today – with common studydays with Unda and the keynote speech by Sean MacBride
- 1987: Quito: World Congress of OCIC with the common Unda–OCIC study days on culture, media and Gospel Values – with a keynote speech by the Polish filmmaker Krzysztof Zanussi
- 1990: Bangkok: World Congress of OCIC and Unda with study days on the new Media age and its challenge
- 1994: Prague: World Congress of OCIC and Unda with study days on media and human dignity
- 1998: Montréal: World Congress of OCIC and Unda with study days on creativity in the media sphere: spiritual opportunity
- 2001: Rome: World Congress of OCIC and Unda – merging into SIGNIS.

=== Catholics and radio and television ===
Catholic radio producers had realized by the mid-1920s that radio had become, like cinema, an important means of spreading ideas, and could therefore influence the views of millions and connect them to Christian values. Already in December 1923, the radio world was waiting for the first international move of the churches to bring religion by means of radio to "humanity". This was put forward because in the Vatican, the Pope was interested to spread the Christian message to all over the earth. The Company of Guglielmo Marconi was already involved in building a radio to transmit the "voice of the Holy Father to almost every land". It became a race against time because the Protestants had the same plans to be present in the world via the new invention which was the radio.

In the US, the first Catholic stations went on the air in 1925 in Canton, Ohio; Yakima, Washington, and East St. Louis, Illinois. That same year, the Paulist Fathers established WLWL, their own radio station in New York. The aim was acquainting the public with the Catholic viewpoint of Current Affairs". Fr. Joseph MacSorley, Superior General specified this in saying that the station intended to be the "official mouthpiece of everything Catholic. We want especially to reach isolated communities where there is no Catholic Church". All lasted only a few years. That year, the Dominican Fr. Lambert Perquin founded the Catholic Radio Broadcasting Company (KRO) in the Netherlands, as did the Socialist Association of Works Amateurs (Vara) and a year later, the Liberal Protestant Radio Broadcasting Company.

European Catholic broadcasters did meet for the first time in May 1927 in Cologne (Germany) while attending an international press exhibition organized by Dr. Konrad Adenauer, the mayor of the city. They decided to gather again a year later to discuss the creating of a permanent international organization for Catholics in radio. This meant not only Catholic radio, but also Catholics working in non-Catholic radio stations. In 1928, they did found the Bureau Catholique International de Radiodiffusion (BCIR) in Cologne during their meeting in June of that year. The name BICR was changed after the war into Unda. The president of BCIR was Fr. Perquin; the director was Msgr. Bernhard Marschall, responsible for the Catholic radio in Germany and of the BCIR General Secretariat in Cologne. At its first International Congress (1929) in Munich, BICR drew attention to the importance of radio for religious, cultural, and social life. It issued a blueprint for action: "Decisions for Catholics and Broadcasting". It also established criteria for membership: "National Committees", representing Catholic individuals and groups professionally or pastorally engaged in broadcasting. In that spirit, BCIR invited Catholics to collaborate with radio companies (private or public) in making religious programmes and to foster Christian values. In 1930, BCIR established formal liaison with the Geneva-based Union Internationale de Radiodiffusion. BCIR was also asked to help in organizing Vatican Radio's first broadcast and to advise them in this new communication domain.

In the 1930s, Catholic broadcasters worldwide had an optimistic view of the development of radio and, later, of the new medium of television. It could transcend frontiers and bring peoples and cultures together. It could be a means of exchanging cultural values, a way of fostering mutual understanding. Radio was thought of as the means par excellence for reconciling peoples, fostering fellowship among nations, and promoting peace. Like OCIC, BCIR also developed different aspects of media education. Due to the arrival of the Nazis into power, the BCIR General Secretariat moved in 1935 from Germany to Amsterdam. Fr. Perquin resigned and Msgr. Marschall became the new president and the Dutch Dominican Fr. John Dito o.p. of the KRO became the new General Secretary.

After World War II and during the succeeding decades, these principles found new expression in radio and television activities. In 1946, BCIR changed its name to Unda, which is Latin for "wave". Its objectives were: to help coordinate professional and apostolic activities of Catholics in radio and television; to promote collaboration among members, through conferences, publications, information exchanges, and research; to represent internationally the interests of members; to help meet communications needs of members; to help meet communications needs of the Third World; and to collaborate with non-Catholic organizations having similar objectives. In February 1958, for example, participants from twelve countries came together in the second ever International Television Festival (the first was the Prix Italia) in the world, organised in Monte Carlo by Unda. This TV festival was supported by Prince Rainier III who, inspired by this event, created the Festival de Télévision de Monte-Carlo three years later. Unda was asked to give a prize at this festival and this tradition has been carried on by SIGNIS.

From 26 to 30 April 1954, Unda conducted an International Congress for Radio/TV specialists and professionals from thirty-two countries attended to talk about preaching via radio and television, family and radio and television (with Fr. Angnellus Andrew o.f.m, working for the BBC, and so on. At the end of the meeting, the Unda General Assembly elected Fr. Kors o.p. as president. Two months later, Unda did found the Department of Television, which was a sub-secretariat directed in Paris by the Dominican Fr. Raymond Pichard o.p. He started to develop a network of eighty TV specialists in twenty countries and published a monthly International Catholic TV review. In February 1954, Unda organized the first International Catholic Conference for Television in Paris and had as its theme "The Status of Catholic Television and Its Place Within National Broadcasting Systems". Due to the conference, the first Eurovision broadcast could be worked out. With the Eurovision officials at the European Broadcasting Union, the Pope could give a message in Italian, French, German, English, and Dutch on Pentecost Sunday.

==== Christian Television Weeks ====
In 1969, the European members of Unda (Unda Europe) and WACC organized the first joint Christian Television Week at Monte-Carlo. Television stations and networks from sixteen countries submitted a total of fifty-two programmes for competition in three categories: drama, entertainment, and news, documentary. Participation took place worldwide. It is done both Unda and WACC, but they take turns as chief organizer; when Unda is responsible, it delegates the job to its European affiliates. The idea is to be an ecumenical forum for fostering TV programmes of high professional standard which reflect the vision of Christianity and values proper to man. Since then the event occurred every two years.

- 1969: Monte Carlo
- 1971: Baden-Baden
- 1973: Salzburg
- 1975: Brighton
- 1977: Montreux
- 1979: Stockholm
- 1981: Amsterdam
- 1983: Dublin
- 1989: Hilversum
- 1995: Buxton
- 1998: Toulouse

==== Unda's periodicals (1934–2001) ====
The 1934 publication of the first BCIR Bulletin represents a principal aim of the organisation through its entire history: to collect and diffuse information and documentation on broadcasting Catholics working in the church but above all in the secular world of broadcasting. The organisation (first BCIR and then Unda) published in his monthly bulletin, a quarterly review or both news for and about the members, coverage of major BCIR/Unda events, commentaries on official Church events and pronouncements, topics in broadcasting (matters of professional technical or pastoral interest), and announcements/decisions of the organisation's governing authorities. In its history, the publications were mostly in English and French but sometimes a number of editions were published in German and Spanish. It aimed a readership which were not only its members and church-related institutions but also the professional world, listeners, and viewers.

- BCIR Bulletin (quarterly) published between 1934 and 1945 in French, edited by Paul Andrien Speet of KRO (Netherlands)
- Unda Bulletin published in 1948 in Fribourg, Switzerland
- International Catholic TV review, (monthly) published in 1952 by Fr. Raymond Pichard
- * Unda-Documentation, a quarterly review launched in December 1976

==== General Assemblies of BCIR and Unda ====
- 1928: Cologne: Foundation of the Bureau Catholique International de Radiodiffusion (BCIR)
- 1929: Munich: Together with OCIC.
- 1936: Prague
- 1947: Fribourg: With the installation of the new General Secretariat in Fribourg and with the new name of Unda (wave)
- 1951: Madrid
- 1953: Cologne
- 1955: Vienna: The themes of the Assembly's study sessions were The Priest Before the Microphone, Broadcasting in the Service of Education, and Liturgy and Television.
- 1957: Geneva
- 1960: Monte Carlo
- 1962: Montréal: The theme of the Assembly's study sessions: Broadcasting and Basic Education in Latin America and Africa.
- 1965: Rome: The theme of the Assembly's study sessions: The Christian Conscience and Radio and Television in a World Characterized by Change.
- 1968: Munich
- 1971: New Orleans
- 1974: Dublin: The theme of the Assembly's study sessions: Mass Media as instruments for evangelization and human development
- 1977: Namur: The theme of the Assembly's study sessions: The needs of our society and the response of mass media
- 1980: Manilla: The theme of the Assembly's study sessions: The role of Unda in a World of Media
- 1983: Nairobi: World Congress Unda with the common Unda–OCIC international study days on Communication and human promotion, the challenges today – with common studydays with Unda and the keynote speech by Sean MacBride
- 1987: Quito: World Congress Unda with the common Unda–OCIC international study days on culture, media, and Gospel Values
- 1990: Bangkok: World Congress of Unda with the common Udna–OCIC international study days on the new Media age and its challenge
- 1994: Prague: World Congress of Unda the common Unda–OCIC international study days on media and human dignity
- 1998: Montréal: World Congress of Unda with the common Unda–OCIC international study days on creativity in the media sphere: spiritual opportunity
- 2001: Rome: Concluded with the merger with OCIC into SIGNIS.

=== Catholics and the press ===
In the 19th century, Catholic newspapers and magazines were founded in countries across the world. The first Catholic diocesan paper in the US, for example, was The Catholic Miscellany launched in Charleston, South Carolina, in 1822. In 1842, the first Catholic newspaper Le Propagateur Catholique in New Orleans, Louisiana was published in French. Before 1914, there were Catholic journalist associations in the United States (CPA). Other publications were founded by religious orders and by lay Catholics with a desire to give a voice to the Church in the public sphere. Notable examples are The Tablet launched in Britain in 1840 by Frederick Lucas, a convert to Catholicism, The Universe launched in Britain in 1860 by Archibald Dunn, and the Catholic Press, an Australian newspaper. In Sri Lanka, the layman John Fernando founded the Gnanartha Pradeepaya, a Sinhala-language Catholic weekly, as a four-page broadsheet of Church news and papal speeches in 1865. In 1886, more than two decades after it started, the Roman Catholic Archdiocese of Colombo became the weekly's official owner. It is one of the oldest Catholic newspapers in Asia. The Assumptionists launched La Croix as a daily newspaper in France in 1883. In 1910, the First Congress for Brazilian Catholic Journalists found a place and the Catholic national press agency O Centro de Boa Imprensa, which aim was to send quality articles to the many small Catholic journals and periodicals all over the country was organized. Before 1914, there were Catholic journalist associations in the United States (CPA), Belgium, Italy, France, Germany, and elsewhere. Catholic newspapers appeared also in Asia. In 1927, young lay Catholics published The Catholic Times of Korea during Japanese colonial rule. At the end of 1927, the International Bureau of Catholic Journalists (later renamed the Federation of National Associations of Catholic Journalists) was founded in Paris. In 1928, the Permanent Commission of Catholic Publishers and Directors of Catholic Newspapers came into being in Cologne in Germany. More and more catholic newspapers were launched worldwide in the coming years as the Malaysian bishops did on 5 January 1935 with the still-existing Malaya Catholic Leader (MCL), published in Singapore.

In 1930, the first Universal Congress of Catholic Journalists was organized in Brussels. The International Bureau of Catholic Journalists planned actions to train Catholic journalists to establish Catholic press agencies and to come up with ways to develop the Catholic Press Action. In 1935, Pius XI did set up a World Exposition of the Press in the Vatican, the heart of fascist Italy in which there was no freedom of the press. That year, it was decided to have formal statutes for the International Bureau of Catholic Journalists. In 1935, the two organizations, the International Bureau of Catholic Journalists and the Permanent Commission of Catholic Publishers and Directors of Catholic Newspapers, federated into an international union of the Catholic press in Marseille. These statutes were presented to the Vatican at the 2nd International Congress of Catholic Journalists in September 1936 in Rome. That year, Count Giuseppe Dalla Torre of the L'Osservatore Romano became the president of the association. In 1937, the Dominican Fr. Felix Morlion, linked with OCIC, proposed an International Newsletter of the film press, to be established in Breda where the secretariat of the International Union of the Catholic Press (IUCP/UCIP) was based. At the annual meeting of the directors of the IUCP in Budapest in 1938, it was decided that the III Universal Congress of the Catholic Press would be held in Poland in September 1939, but it could not be held due to the outbreak of the Second World War. Finally, the congress was held in Rome in 1950 with, for the first time, vice presidents from French-speaking Canada and the United States, although the CPA became a member-only in 1955.

After the war, the secretariat of the organisation was transferred to Paris. The fourth congress was held in Paris in May 1954, on the theme: "The Catholic press in the world, its mission, its future", with the participation of 250 journalists from 28 countries. At the UCIP Congress in Vienna in 1957, with four hundred participants from 32 countries, it was stated that one of the aims of the Catholic press was to become a trusted source of information for non-Catholics. In 1963, Pope John XXIII declared in his encyclical Pacem in terris (Peace on Earth) freedom of speech and publication to be a human right.

One of the significant Congresses was the one held in 1965 in New York. It was UCIP's eighth Congress, held together with the 55th annual convention of the CPA, and 800 journalists, including 600 from the United States, discussed the theme: "The truth in the search for freedom." The discussions were about freedom in politics, in art, in the press, and the relation between freedom and authority, freedom and civic rights, and freedom and the international order. Afterwards the name was changed to International Catholic Union of the Press (UCIP). At its fiftieth anniversary in 1977, the twelfth World Congress of UCIP was held in Vienna, bringing together 350 participants. It was preceded by a meeting of about fifty delegates from so-called "Third World" countries. A major theme was the New World Order of Information and Communication (NOMIC). Its 18th World Congress was held in Paris at UNESCO Headquarters with some 1,000 Catholic journalists from all over the world together. Among about 400 members of UCIP's young journalist network who had their own convention three days before the main World Congress. Theresa Ee-Chooi of Malaysia was elected as the first woman president. She was also the first Asian and first non-European president of the organisation.

On 19 September 2001, a few days after the attack on the World Trade Center towers, more than a thousand participants attended the twentieth UCIP Congress, at the University of Fribourg in Switzerland, to discuss the theme: "The Media and the Challenge of Globalization." Congress delegates issued a statement in which they condemned terrorism as well as all acts of violence against innocent victims. They pleaded for dialogue, reconciliation, and peace. The meeting of reporters, editors, and professors of journalism and communication aimed to give "the opportunity to understand and analyze globalization in both its positive and negative effects." Two days before the Congress, the International Meeting of Young Journalists, a branch of UCIP, was held. Despite the reluctance of the Vatican, the UCIP adopted somewhat later new statutes that allow the reception of non-Catholics. Due to administrative mismanagement of the elections of the board of UCIP of 2007 at the 22nd Congress in Sherbrooke, Canada and other issues, the Vatican withdrew recognition of UCIP as a Catholic association. Following a formal statement made by the Vatican – "resulting from the serious management crisis the organisation has been experiencing for years" – UCIP (International Catholic Press Union) was no longer able to use the adjective "Catholic".

==== UCIP's periodicals ====
In 1952, the first newsletter was sent out from the Paris General Secretariat of UCIP. It was published in French as Bulletin International de l'UICP, and in Spanish. Later editions were also published in German and English. Between 1961 and 1972, a bi-monthly publication called Journalistes Catholiques (65 issues) were published by the UCIP Secretary General, the French Assumptionist Fr. Emile Gabel (1908–1968).

==== General Assemblies of UCIP ====
- 1930: Brussels: First World Congress of the Catholic Press
- 1936: Rome: 2nd International Congress of Catholic Journalists
- 1950: Rome: 3rd UICP World Congress
- 1954: Paris: 4th UICP World Congress on The Catholic Press in the world, its mission and its future, May
- 1957: Vienna: 5th UICP World Congress
- 1960: Santander: 6th UICP World Congress
- 1963: Rome: 7th UICP World Congress
- 1965: New York City: 8th UICP World Congress
- 1968: Berlin: 9th UCIP World Congress
- 1971: Luxembourg: 10th UCIP World Congress
- 1974: Buenos Aires: 11th UCIP World Congress
- 1977: Vienna: 12th UCIP World Congress
- 1980: Rome: 13th UCIP World Congress
- 1983: Dublin: 14th UCIP World Congress
- 1986: New Delhi: 15th UCIP World Congress
- 1989: Ruhpolding: 16th UCIP Congress
- 1992: Campos do Jordão: 17th UCIP World Congress
- 1995: Graz: 18th UCIP World Congress
- 1998: Paris: 19th UCIP World Congress on The Press: A Medium for Tomorrow
- 2001: Fribourg: 20th UCIP World Congress on Media and the Challenge of Globalization
- 2004: Bangkok: 21st UCIP World Congress on Media Challenges amidst Cultural and Religions Pluralism for a new Social Order, Justice and Peace
- 2007: Sherbrooke: 24th UCIP World Congress on Media and Religion: Risk or Opportunity?
- 2010: Ouagadougou: UCIP World Congress

=== Catholics in radio, television, cinema, and press working together ===
From the 1960s, Unda and OCIC began to hold joint meetings and assemblies and incorporated work on the small and grassroots media that were then being developed. After the Unda-OCIC Congress in Manilla in 1980, the first joint meeting of the boards of Unda and OCIC was held in Washington in 1982 to study mutual relations. A commission, led by the American Fr. John Geaney, CSP, suggested that the two organizations should merge. But at the World Congress in Quito of 1987, the proposal was not accepted: they said yes to intense collaboration, but no to a merger. This decision was a paradox, because a few days earlier, the Latin American branches of the three Catholic organizations for the press, cinema, and radio and TV (UCLAP, OCIC-AL, Unda-AL) had created a joint secretariat to cover all the media, but the rest of the world did not follow them. The 1980s saw the proliferation of video use, soon followed by rapid developments in information technology and the growth of digital media and the Internet.

Between UCIP, Unda, and OCIC, there were always contacts. As the offices of OCIC and (since the 1970s for) Unda were also in Belgium, these contacts were easy and friendly. All three organizations were represented on the board of the Catholic Media Council in Aachen, Germany from 1977 to 1991. The bonds became closer later. In the 1970s and 1980, UCIP's president was the Belgian Louis Meerts (1937–2007). He was succeeded by Austrian Hanns Sassman and German Günther Mees. At the UCIP World Congress in Pattaya, Thailand, in 1996, Mees appealed for closer ties with OCIC and Unda. He said UCIP, OCIC, and Unda members could train Catholic journalists and work together in a way that reflected sincere faith and make "Catholic" mean "quality". Since many members of Unda and OCIC worked in several media, and since media ministry was cross-media, the impetus for a combined Catholic Association for audio-visual media grew ever stronger, eventually leading to the merger of Unda and OCIC as SIGNIS on 21 November 2001 in Rome. Following the demise of UCIP in 2011, SIGNIS opened up membership to Catholic journalists, and at the SIGNIS World Congress of 2017 in Quebec, several Catholic press associations, former members of UCIP, were welcomed into SIGNIS, among them the CPA (Catholic Press Association of the United States and Canada).

=== Catholics and media education ===
SIGNIS recognizes the power of the media and their influence in all aspects of individual, community, and social life. Media education is seen as a movement from a critical awareness of the languages and techniques of the media, through analysis of the values they project and their influence on our lives, towards a responsible participation in the use of media for the betterment of the person and society. It is a way to enable the citizen to examine the process of media production, media strategies, media ownership, the ways knowledge and meaning are made, as well as media's immense power for empowerment. The areas covered by SIGNIS in this perspective are very diverse: advertising, radio, popular music, film, television, video, and the Internet. A media educated person is able to create his or her own media statements, to engage confidently with media producers, and to exercise actively his or her rights as a democratic citizen. So, it is understandable that this work is one of the most important fields of action of SIGNIS. The SIGNIS Media Education Project aims to bring together worldwide experiences and achievements in this field. SIGNIS members want to come together to use financial, material, and human resources more effectively so that they can give a coherent response to the "onslaught of national and global media" on people and cultures across the world. SIGNIS wants to build a world network of media educators and/or media education organizations – something which doesn't yet exist. The predecessors of SIGNIS, Unda and OCIC, had a very long tradition in this field. In the 1950s, for example; in 1954, the president of OCIC, Mons. Jean Bernard from Luxembourg was one of those who with UNESCO gave a decisive push which led to the foundation of the International Center for Films for Children and Young People, CIFEJ, and a year later, the Belgian Fr. Léo Lunders o.p. of OCIC became a founder of CIFEJ; in the 1960s and 1970s, the organizations supported the Plan DENI in Latin America; and from 1987 to 2001, Unda with OCIC produced its Educommunication Magazine (or in French Educommunication Nouvelles).

=== Catholics and the digital world ===
From the 1970s on, the digital world did start expanding worldwide also in the Catholic world. The home computer meant that the digital world was entering fast into mass culture. It was as if it absorbed the bits and digits of mass culture like a lightning fire. The arrival of the first real digital camera in 1988 changed a lot – even more when Photoshop came into being shortly after. A year later, the World Wide Web was invented and soon became accessible for the general public. Around 1995, the Internet and the digital sound and images in all media and communications were introduced. Quickly, mass culture became digital. In 1997, the first social networking website SixDegrees.com was launched. Nine years later, Facebook entered the world. Social media became definitely part of the digital world and often attracts all the attention of the user day and night. The digital evolution has entered into virtually every part of life and society, from young children to adults and the elderly. Catholic communicators were attentive to this evolution. All this shapes a greater part of the world view and view of life of ever more people, which implies ethical aspects. The Vatican was also alert to this evolution. The Pontifical Council for Social Communications (PCSS) published a series of documents on this topic such as Ethics in Advertising (1997), Ethics in Communications (2000), and Ethics in Internet(2001). During the discussion which led to this document on ethics in the Internet, Pope John Paul II supported the reflection of the PCSS. He felt the urgency to have a kind of guidance in this field. In Ethics in Internet, he considered the digital as a great help to the Church's pastors and faithful in facing the many challenges of the emerging media culture. He wrote:

Opportunities created by new technology, by the process of globalization, by deregulation and privatization of the media present new ethical and indeed spiritual challenges to those who work in social communications. These challenges will be met effectively by those who accept that serving the human person, building up a community grounded in solidarity, justice, and love, and speaking the truth about human life and its final fulfillment in God were, are, and will remain at the heart of ethics in the media.

In Ethics in Internet, the ethical questions asked were multiple: Will it contribute to authentic human development and community building? Will the digital divide favor social and economic justice? Will it not be dominated by one commercial secular culture? Will it guarantee the freedom of expression and the exchange of ideas? Will it serve serious journalism? Pope Francis in his message for the 48th World Communication Day (2014) calls the faithful to become "boldly citizens of the digital world" which can be an environment rich in humanity; a network not of wires but of people. "Personal engagement is the basis of the trustworthiness of a communicator. Christian witness, thanks to the Internet, can thereby reach the peripheries of human existence."

From 1980 on, this was a reinforced tendency for OCIC and Unda. In 1981, Br. Ferdinand Poswick, linked with OCIC, launched his project to digitalize the Bible and to bring it in the digital new world for research. The digital evolution, or revolution, had an indirect influence on the birth of SIGNIS. In 1993, the General Secretariat of OCIC with its secretary general Robert Molhant introduced the e-mail, first with the Missionary Service of OCIC in Rome and then with the members worldwide. The organisation entered a new era of communication. In the 1990s, it was clear for Unda, OCIC, and even UCIP that in the digital world, the images and sounds (television, film, music, radio, and journalism) were dissolving the boundaries between traditional media. In 1996, OCIC organised at its 4th World Video and Multimedia Forum in Cologne, Germany, themed to "A symposium on the Computer and its global Empire". The keynote was given by Derrick de Kerckhove. His words on 28 September 1996 in Cologne that the "user of the internet provides the content" were prophetic. Catholic communicators then asked him the question "How will the technology use us?" At that time, he couldn't give a clear answer, but he drew attention to the possible ethical effects on the digital new world. At the OCIC/Unda World Congress in Rome in 2001, at the birth of SIGNIS, a symposium/seminar was given by webmasters. In 2006, SIGNIS staff member Jim McDonnell presented a paper to the ECIC in London, linking media literacy and advocacy issues. In 2008, a cover story on the changing media landscape which is the establishing of the digital world was published in SIGNIS Media. For SIGNIS, there is also the dimension of how the values of the gospel can be present and enhance the digital age at the service for a better world for humankind. At the SIGNIS Quebec World Congress in June 2017, the Board established a digital desk alongside the other desks (cinema, television, radio, media education, and journalism). The theme of the SIGNIS-Africa General Congress and Assembly held in Addis Ababa, Ethiopia in September 2019 was "The African Youth in the Digital World; Promoting Creativity for Integral Development". The theme came up with the conclusion that the digital media should be at the service of integral human development, especially that of the youth in Africa who are the majority of the population in the continent. The SIGNIS-Africa President, Fr. Walter Ihejirika from Nigeria, affirmed that the Congress aimed at creating practical pathways for promoting the welfare of youth and children in the changing digital world. He stressed the need of building SIGNIS-Africa into a strong communication association capable of addressing communication challenges in Africa for purposes of empowering the youth.

== Presidents and secretaries general of OCIC, Unda, UCIP, and SIGNIS ==
=== UCIP secretaries-general and presidents 1927–2011 ===
UCIP secretaries-general for the period 1927–2011: Joseph Ageorges (France, 1927–1940); Hein Houben (The Netherlands; 1935–1940); Jean-Pierre Dubois‐Dumée (France, 1950–1955); Emile Gabel (France, 1955–1968); Pierre Chevalier (France, 1974–1980); Bruno Holtz (Switzerland, 1984–1993); Joseph Chittilappilly (India, 1993–2011)

UCIP presidents for the period 1927–2011: René Delforge (Belgium, 1927–1934); Count Giuseppe Dalla Torre (Italy, 1936–1960); Raimondo Manzini (Italy, 1960–1972); Louis Meerts (Belgium, 1972–1980); Hanns Sassman (Austria, 1980–1986); Günther Mees (Germany, 1992–1998); Theresa Ee Chooi (Malaysia, 1998–2011)

=== Unda secretaries-general and presidents 1928–2001 ===
Unda secretaries-general for the period 1928–2001: Mgr. Bernhard Marschall (Germany, 1928–1935); P. John Dito (OP, The Netherlands, 1935–1938); M. Paul Andrien Speet (The Netherlands, 1938–1942); M. Joseph Diening (The Netherlands, 1942–1950); M. François Van Hoek (Switzerland, 1950–1952); P. John Dito (OP, The Netherlands, 1952–1953); P. Bonaventura Jansen (OP, The Netherlands, 1953–1954); Fr. Joseph Schneuwly (Switzerland, 1954–1971); Fr. John Stapleton (UK, 1971–1974); Fr. Jean Desautels (SJ, Canada, 1974–1981); Fr. Colm Murphy (Ireland, 1981–1994); Fr. Victor Sunderaj (India, 1994–1998); Fr. Pierre Bélanger (SJ, Canada, 1998–2001)

Unda presidents for the period 1928–2001: P. Lambert Henricus Perquin (OP, The Netherlands, 1928–1935); Mgr. Bernhard Marschall (Germany, 1935–1938); Fr. John Dito (OP, The Netherlands, 1938–1946); Mgr F. Prosperini (Italy, 1946–1948); P. Johannes Benedict Kors (OP, The Netherlands, 1950–1962); Mgr. Jacques Haas (Switzerland, 1962–1968); Fr. Agnellus Andrew (OFM, Scotland, 1968–1980); P. Anthony Scannell (OFM Cap. USA, 1980–1987); Mr. Chainarong Monthienvichienchai (Thailand, 1987–1994); Sr. Angela Ann Zukowski (MHSH, USA, 1994–2001)

=== OCIC secretaries-general and presidents 1928–2001 ===
OCIC secretaries-general for the period 1928–2001: Rev. Joseph Reymond (France, 1928–1933); Fr. Jean Bernard (Luxembourg, 1935–1947); Fr. Felix Morlion (Belgium, 1944–1945 – provisory secretary-general); Mrs. Yvonne de Hemptinne (Belgium, 1947–1978); M. Robert Molhant (Belgium, 1979–2002).

OCIC presidents for the period 1928–2001: Dr. George Ernst (Germany, 1928–1933); Canon Abel Brohée (Belgium, 1933–1947); Rev. Jean Bernard (Switzerland, 1947–1972); Rev. Lucien Labelle (Canada, 1972–1980); Fr. Ambros Eichenberger (o.p., Switzerland, 1980–1990); Fr. Henk Hoekstra (O. Carm. The Netherlands, 1990–1998); Fr. Peter Malone (MSC, Australia, 1998–2002)

=== SIGNIS secretaries-general and presidents 2001– ===
SIGNIS secretaries-general for the period 2001–: M. Robert Molhant (Belgium, 2001–2005); M. Marc Aellen (Switzerland, 2006–2007); Fr. Bernardo Suate (Mozambique, 2007–2008); M. Alvito de Souza (Kenya, 2008–2015). M. Ricardo Yañez (USA/Argentina, 2015–2022); M. Peter Rachada Monthienvichienchai (Thailand, 2022– )

SIGNIS presidents for the period 2001–: Fr. Peter Malone (MSC, Australia, 2001–2005); M. Augie Loorthusamy (Malaysia, 2005–2014). M. Gustavo Andujar (Cuba, 2014–2017), Ms. Helen Osman (USA, 2017–)

== Structure and activities of SIGNIS ==
SIGNIS, an international organisation according to Swiss law, has its General Secretariat in Brussels and a specialized technical office in Rome (SIGNIS Service Rome). In September 2023 the Assembly of Delegates moved to relocate the administrative office from Brussels to Rome. In 2015, SIGNIS chose Archbishop Oscar Romero as its patron because of his willingness to give his life rather than be silent in the face of justice. Romero was canonized in October 2018.

The organization's diverse programmes cover different media/communication fields and for each one, a special department was founded, called a "desk". It consists of a president and a network of regional representatives. Each desk has a chair and a core-group. The desks develop the different media/communication fields, promote the work of members in these fields, and help coordinate meetings and training.

=== The Cinema Desk ===
With the merger of OCIC with Unda into SIGNIS, the presence in festivals of Catholic members of the organisation not only continued but developed considerably. It is one way of having contact with the professional world and also a way of bringing together in a jury, professionals who are active in TV, media education, radio, and film criticism. OCIC gave its very first prize to the Italian film Vivere in Pace (To Live in Peace) by Luigi Zampa, at the Brussels World Film Festival in 1947. The first award of SIGNIS went in 2002 to the Egyptian film Asrar al Bana (The secret of the young girl) by Magdi Ahmed Ali at the Milan African Film Festival. In 2017, SIGNIS juries (representing the national and international members of SIGNIS) were in Venice, San Sebastían, Mar del Plata, Buenos Aires, Havana, Montevideo, Milan, Toulouse, Washington, Tehran, Santo Domingo, Zanzibar, Ouagadougou, Religion Today, Besançon, and Hong Kong. SIGNIS has continued the ecumenical dialogue in cinema, which started in 1974 at the Locarno Festival. In 2017, SIGNIS representatives collaborated with members of the International Interchurch Film Organisation (Interfilm). SIGNIS continued also the ecumenical dialogue in cinema, which started in 1974 at the Locarno Festival. In 2017, SIGNIS representatives collaborate with members of Interfilm in 17 international film festivals to award an ecumenical prize (Cannes, Berlin, Fribourg, Oberhausen, Locarno, Kiev, Cottbus, Leipzig, Mannheim-Heidelberg, Montréal, Yerevan, Karlovy Vary, Zlín, Schlingel, Saarbrücken, and Warsaw). This policy of dialogue with other Christian churches was extended in 2002 to other religions in inter-religious juries. The first interfaith jury was organized in Tehran in 2003 at the Fajr International Film Festival. This jury comprises two jury members selected by SIGNIS and one or two Muslim jury members selected by the festival. The jury has to consider for its award a new Iranian feature film. The idea of jury representatives from different faiths was followed by the Brisbane International Film Festival (2003–2009), Nyon (2005–), Dhaka, Bangladesh (2006–), and Leipzig since 2016. SIGNIS develops this dialogue according to the criteria of the Pontifical Council for Social Communications published in 1989 in which "Manipulation or base proselytism, at times practiced in the media, is incompatible with the ecumenical task and with the spirit of inter-religious cooperation,... and as the decisions of ecclesiastical authorities affirm." In November 2016, the Cinema Desk of SIGNIS organized the 1st International Seminar of Film and Values in Barcelona with the Directorate of Religious Affairs of the Government of Catalonia and the Blanquerna Observatory on Media, Religion and Culture. This Seminar brought together the promoters of different international film festivals in which religion and its artistic expression stand central.

=== The TV Desk ===
SIGNIS supports the production and distribution of quality television programmes throughout the world, organizing seminars that bring together TV producers, programmers, and channels searching for opportunities for co-production or collaboration. SIGNIS also collaborates with the Catholic Radio and Television Network (CRTN). It continues and develops the work of Unda in the different TV festivals, which started in the late 1950s in Monte Carlo. In the following years, Unda had juries at other international TV festivals including the Prix Italia and the Rose d'Or in Montreux. In 2017, it gave prizes for the best of television in festivals at the Monte-Carlo Television Festival, the Prix Italia, and the Plural+ Festival. Every three years, the SIGNIS European region co-organized a European Television Festival of Religious Programmes with the WACC Europe, hosted by different national public broadcasters. The 2017 edition took place in Paris in June.

In November 2003, SIGNIS held its first workshop for Catholic radio stations in East and South Africa in Cape Town, South Africa. This aimed to encourage networking and collective strategic planning to enable Catholic radio stations on the continent to better face the challenges and opportunities arising in their regions. SIGNIS was asked by these radio stations to concentrate its efforts within the existing ecclesiastical regional structures in Africa. Efforts were to be directed at strengthening local capacities within these existing structures rather than creating separate structures for networking radios in Africa to avoid duplication and unnecessary competition with existing Church structures. At the 2005 SIGNIS World Congress in Lyon, for the first time, a selected international panel of national and international Catholic radio networks as well as some major international Catholic radio stations from all around the world came together in a Consultative Seminar for Catholic radio networks.

==== International SIGNIS TV desk seminars of Catholic TV producers ====
The seminar is open to Catholic television stations, channels, institutions, producers, and production centres. The aim is to build a network and to share capacities, enable co-productions, and build a professional community. The first secretary general of SIGNIS, Robert Molhant, did initiate the TV seminars in 2003 with the first meeting in Cape Town.

- 2003: Cape Town (South Africa): In conjunction with the Sithengi television market and the SIGNIS Board meeting.
- 2004: Strasbourg (France): In conjunction with the SIGNIS Board meeting.
- 2005: Prague (Czech Republic)
- 2005: Lyon (France): In conjunction with the SIGNIS World Congress.
- 2006: Madrid (Spain): In conjunction with the World Congress of Catholic Television, an initiative of the Pontifical Council for Social Communications (Vatican).
- 2007: Bucharest (Romania): In conjunction with the International Festival on Children's Rights, an initiative of both SIGNIS Romania and UNICEF.
- 2008: Buenos Aires (Argentina)
- 2009: Chiang Mai (Thailand): In conjunction with the SIGNIS World Congress.
- 2010: Luxembourg
- 2011: Costa Rica: With the theme: "New Media, New audiences and the challenges faced by Catholic producers".
- 2013: Nairobi (Kenya): With the theme: "Media for development".
- 2014: Saint Petersburg (Russia): With the theme: "Dialogue of Churches, Dialogue of cultures".
- 2015: Aparecida (Brasil): With the theme: "Knowing Your Audience: Connecting to the Periphery".
- 2016: Taipei (Taiwan): With the theme: "Imaging the Church in Media: Television and Journalism".
- 2018: Dublin (Eire): With the theme: "Beyond Production: Marketing for Maximum Impact".
- 2020: A seminar in Prague (Czech Republic) was planned, but due to the Covid pandemic it was canceled.

=== The Radio Desk ===
SIGNIS supports the development of community radio and Catholic radio stations, and promotes existing radio networks and associations. Radio is still an important medium. SIGNIS is involved in Catholic and community radios all over the world and especially in Africa. SIGNIS does not intend to establish its own Catholic radio networks. Rather, SIGNIS seeks to reinforce existing networks and encourage interaction between networks to enhance the shared learning experience. SIGNIS policy is one of subsidiarity and promoting professional collaboration. SIGNIS Services Rome provides technical consultation and equipment to radio stations, especially in Africa. It helps with training, logistics, and building networks for its members.

=== The Journalism Desk ===
Since 2014, SIGNIS has been actively working to offer a space for former members of UCIP and other Catholic journalist organizations in SIGNIS. In some cases, Catholic journalists are fully integrated into existing SIGNIS national structures (as, for example, in Brazil or Hungary), but the situation varies widely from country to country. Also since then, SIGNIS has aimed to offer a place of exchange and solidarity for those Catholics working in all forms of journalism and publishing. It aims to promote ethical professional journalism in the new multimedia era; to build a global network for Catholic journalists working across different media in different regions; to strengthen solidarity and personal ties among Catholic journalists through regular sharing of stories and information; and to support freedom of expression and the rights of journalists. The first international seminar for Catholic journalists and writers was organized by SIGNIS in Kuala Lumpur. Some twenty Catholic journalists came from Pakistan, Korea, the Philippines, Vietnam, Thailand, Indonesia, India, Japan, Cambodia, Malaysia, Sri Lanka, Bangladesh, and Singapore.

=== The Media Education Desk ===
In 2007, SIGNIS representatives from Asia, Africa, the Pacific, Latin America, North America, and Europe initiated the SIGNIS Media Education Project (SiGMEP) aimed at setting up a Global Media Education Network and set out a SIGNIS Charter on Media Education. In 2008, regional meetings were held in Asia and Europe to ratify this charter and elaborate regional media education plans. Since 2014, the newly formed "Media Education Desk" refocused its attention to develop and empower young communicators around the world. In order to concretely reach its goal, SIGNIS developed an intensive emersion and exposure communication program for young communicators: the COMMLAB (Communication Laboratory). Since then, participants from Asia, Africa and North America have graduated from COMMLAB.

=== The Digital Desk ===
The SIGNIS Desk was founded at the SIGNIS Quebec World Congress in June 2017. SIGNIS explores how best this new technology can be harnessed to serve the common good and enhance the quality of communication for the majority of people. One of SIGNIS' main objectives is to help reduce the digital divide between those countries closely "connected" to the global digital highways and those in the poorer regions of the world which are still struggling to "connect" to their own towns and villages. For this, SIGNIS Services Rome provides an Internet service via satellite that covers all of Africa: the VSAT system.

== General Assemblies and World Congresses of SIGNIS ==
Every four years, the Assembly of Delegates of SIGNIS has to meet face-to-face to elect or re-elect its president, vice presidents, and to nominate the secretary-general. This meeting brings together members of the association from across the globe. It contains also a series of workshops, seminaries to share experiences, keynote speeches of specialists in different fields of communication, a film program, a board meeting, and other activities.

- 2001: Rome (Italy): World Congress: the merger of OCIC and Unda into the new World Association SIGNIS
- 2005: Lyon (France): World Congress SIGNIS: the theme was Peace through Media.
- 2009: Chiang Mai (Thailand): World Congress SIGNIS: the theme was Media for a Culture of Peace – Children's Rights, Tomorrow's Promise.
- 2013: Beirut (Lebanon): World Congress SIGNIS: foreseen but canceled
- 2014: Rome (Italy): World Congress SIGNIS: the theme was Media for a Culture of Peace: Creating Images with the New Generation.
- 2017: Quebec (Canada): World Congress SIGNIS: accepting the Catholic Press Association of the United States and Canada (CPA) as member of SIGNIS. Guests of Honor: Martin Scorsese and Rock Demers.
- 2022: Seoul (South Korea): SIGNIS World Congress "Peace in the Digital World".

== SIGNIS' periodicals since 2002 ==
In 2002, SIGNIS started with a multilingual (Spanish/English/French) quarterly magazine called SIGNIS MEDIA and has a website www.signis.net. All issues of SIGNIS MEDIA from 2006 on, as well the new publication CineMag, can be consulted in their digital version on the SIGNIS website. Since 2017. the cover of the magazine was not anymore the responsibility of the chief editor and in October 2018, with issue 4/2018, a new editorial policy has been initiated. Although it was not foreseen since 2019, the cinema pages in SIGNIS MEDIA are not anymore reflecting the activities of the organisation in the professional world of cinema. In February 2019, SIGNIS started a new international multilingual trimestrial film magazine CineMag, seeing that cinema is still significant for the association and her mission to be present in the professional world. Cinema as art, an expression of human creativity, is a medium that influences cultures with values and worldviews. Since 1947, OCIC has been invited by international festivals to participate with juries (SIGNIS, Ecumenical, and inter-religious) to promote quality films that artistically translate values. In its 72 years, more than 2,000 films have been awarded or mentioned and most are now considered classics. This new journal wants to mark the presence of SIGNIS in the world of the cinema, but also to be an organ for its journalists-critics and media educators working in more than one hundred countries. It wants to tie on in the tradition of the International Cinema Review. The first issue of CineMag was dedicated to honoring the 50th anniversary of FESPACO – the African film festival held in Ouagadougou. Cinema in Africa has always been a concern of OCIC / SIGNIS. Since 1952, its member in Egypt promotes local cinema. In the 1950s, the OCIC missionary service in Rome used cinema for evangelization. His director Fr. Jean-Marie Poitevin, a Canadian known for his film At the Crossroads (À la croisée des chemins) in 1943, refused to make colonial propaganda. Since the independence of most African countries, missionaries in Senegal (Fr. Jean Vast), Congo (Fr. Alexander Van den Heuvel) and Poitevin in Rome have been working to decolonize the cinemagoing and production. It was part of their evangelization and meant humanizing the formerly colonized peoples who had been dehumanized by Western powers and their media. They supported Africans to make their own images and tell their own stories, not only for the public in Africa but also for the rest of the world. In the 1960s, Van den Heuvel proposed to OCIC to give Ousmane Sembène's Mandabi his Grand Prix. Then the organisation accepted the proposal of Professor Victor Bachy to consider promoting African cinema as one of its priorities for the future. At Unda, broadcasting of radio and television channels in Africa was also one of its priority concerns. In 1973, OCIC installed its first jury at FESPACO and the first prize went to Sambizanga by Sarah Maldoror denouncing colonialism and its atrocities. Since then, OCIC and now SIGNIS, developed actions to promote not only African cinema in Africa but also elsewhere in the world.

The second issue of CineMag, presented at the Zlín Film Festival in May 2019 to celebrate the 20th anniversary of the Ecumenical jury at the festival, gave a focus on the child in the film and how OCIC and SIGNIS dealt with this issue in its cinema activities. Since the beginning of cinema, children in relation to cinema has been a concern of OCIC / SIGNIS and was even one of the main reasons why OCIC was founded in 1928. Catholics organized educational sessions for children in their schools and parishes. This experience has been recognized by the League of Nations. After the war, the festivals of Cannes and Venice had taken several initiatives on cinema for children. In 1950, the Venice International Film Festival invited OCIC to organize study days on the production and distribution of children's films. In the following years, OCIC's director of the Children's Films Service, P. Leo Lunders O.P., worked with UNESCO to launch the International Film Center for Children and Youth (CIFEJ) in 1957, in which he stayed active for years. His experiences were also shared with other organisations, such as the International Catholic Child Bureau (or Bureau International Catholique de l'Enfance) (BICE). Between 1970 and 1987, an OCIC Jury gave its award at the children's film festival in Gijón (Spain), known as the Certamen Internacional de Cine para la Infancia y la Juventud (International Film Competition for Children and Youth of Gijón). Film education became one of the priorities of OCIC / SIGNIS. Since the 1990s, members of OCIC / SIGNIS in Latin America were involved in UNICEF's Plan DENI (Plan de niños) as the film festival Divercine in Montevideo and linked cinema with media education such as Cine Mundo Chico in Argentina. It also organized with its film critics and juries in international festivals specializing in children's films such as Zlín, Schlingel-Chemnitz, and also Divercine. For more than seventy years, juries with OCIC / SIGNIS members have always given great attention to films evoking the human condition of childhood in general film festivals such as Cannes, Berlin, Buenos Aires, Venice, etc. All issues of CineMag can be consulted in their digital version on the SIGNIS website.

The third issue of CineMag was presented at the Baku cultural event in September 2019 and at the Religion Today Film Festival in Trento in October 2019 and is dedicated to the inter-religious dialogue.

== Members ==
=== SIGNIS in Africa and in the Indian Ocean Islands ===
The members in Africa and in the Indian Ocean Islands are:

Country	member
Angola	CEA, Comisión de Medios de Comunicación Social
Burkina Faso	CEBEN, Commission des Moyens de Communication
Republic of the Congo	CCC, Commission Episcopale des MCS
Democratic Republic of the Congo	SIGNIS RDC
Ethiopia	CBCE, Catholic Bishops' Conference of Ethiopia
The Gambia	Gambia Pastoral Institute
Ghana	GEC, DEPSOCOM, NSC, National Catholic Secretariat
Ivory Coast	CEMCSCI, Commission Episcopale des MCS de Côte d'Ivoire
Kenya	KCCB, Social Communications Department
Madagascar	Radio Don Bosco
Malawi	ECM, Social Communication Department
Mali	CEM, Commission Nationale des MCS
Mauritius	CAPAV, Compagnie d'Animation et de Production Audiovisuelle
Mozambique	CEM, Comisión Episcopal de MCS
Nigeria	SIGNIS Nigeria
Réunion	Association RE.AU.VI
Senegal	CES, Commission des MCS
Seychelles	Diocèse de Port-Victoria, Service Audio-visuel
South Africa	SACBC, Southern African Catholic Bishops' Conference
Togo	CET, Commission Nationale Catholique des MCS
Uganda	UEC, Social Communications Department
Zambia	ZEC, Catholic Media Services
Zimbabwe	ZCBC, Social Communications Commission

=== SIGNIS in Asia ===
The members of SIGNIS in Asia are:

Country	member
Bangladesh	Christian Communications Centre
Cambodia	Catholic Social Communications
East Timor	CPA, Casa de Produção Audiovisual
Hong Kong	Hong Kong Diocesan Audio-Visual Centre
India	SIGNIS India
Indonesia	SIGNIS Indonesia
Japan	SIGNIS JAPAN
Korea	SIGNIS Korea
Macau	Macau Diocesan Social Communication Center
Malaysia	SIGNIS Malaysia
Myanmar	CBCM, Episcopal Commission for Social Communications
Pakistan	Rabita Manzil
Philippines	SIGNIS Philippines
Singapore	Communications Office of the Archdiocese of Singapore
Sri Lanka	NCCSC, National Catholic Centre for Social Communication
Taiwan	RBCT, Regional Bishops' Conference of Taiwan, Social Communications
Thailand	CSCT, Catholic Social Communications of Thailand
Vietnam	CBCV, Social Communications Commission

=== SIGNIS in Europe and the Middle East ===
The members of SIGNIS in Europe and the Middle East are:

Country	member
Austria	Medienreferat der Österreichischen Bischofskonferenz
Belgium (Flemish)	Filmmagie vzw
Belgium (Flemish)	KTRO, Katholieke Televisie en Radio Omroep
Belgium (French)	Média Animation, Communication & Éducation
Czech Republic	TV Noe
France	Fédération des Médias Catholiques
Germany	Deutsche Bischofskonferenz
Hungary	MAKÚSZ - Hungarian Catholic Association of the Press
Ireland	ICBC, Catholic Communications Office
Italy	Ufficio Nazionale per le Comunicazioni Sociali della CEI
Lebanon	CCI, Centre Catholique d'Information
Luxembourg	Communication & Presse de l'Archidiocèse de Luxembourg
Malta	RTK Radio Limited / Media Centre
Monaco	Centre Catholique Communication et Culture
Netherlands	KRO Television
Poland	SIGNIS Polska
Portugal	Secretariado Nacional da Pastoral da Cultura
Romania	SIGNIS Roumanie
Slovakia	LUX Communication
Slovenia	SBC, Slovenian Bishops' Conference, Commission for mass media
Spain	SIGNIS-España
Spain	UCIPE - Unión Católica de Informadores y Periodistas de España
Switzerland (FRENCH)	Commission pour la communication et les médias de la Conférence des évêques suisses
Switzerland (GERMAN)	Katholisches Medienzentrum
Switzerland (ITALIAN)	Centro Cattolico per la Radio e la Televisione

=== SIGNIS in Latin America and the Caribbean ===
The members in Latin America and the Caribbean are:

Country	member
Argentina	SIGNIS-Argentina, Asociación Católica Argentina para la Comunicación
Brazil	SIGNIS-Brasil, Asociação Católica de Comunicação
Chile	Coordinadora de los Comunicadores Católicos de Chile
Costa Rica	SIGNIS-Costa Rica Asociación Católica Costarricense de Comunicación
Cuba	SIGNIS-Cuba, Organización Católica Cubana para la Comunicación
Dominican Republic	SIGNIS-República Dominicana
Ecuador	SIGNIS-Ecuador, Asociación Católica de Comunicación
Grenada	Diocese of Grenada, Communications Commission
Mexico	SIGNIS de México AC
Paraguay	ACCP, Asociación de Comunicadores Católicos de Paraguay
Peru	APC, Asociación Peruana de Comunicadores - Mons. Luciano Metzinger – Signis-Perú
Suriname	Diocese of Paramaribo, Media Coordination
Trinidad and Tobago	AEC, Antilles Episcopal Conference
Trinidad and Tobago	TCN, Trinity Communications Network
Venezuela	SIGNIS-Venezuela

=== SIGNIS in North America ===
The members in North America are:

Country	member
Canada (English)	ARCCC, Association of Roman Catholic Communicators of Canada
Canada (French)	Communications et Société
United States	Catholic Academy of Communication Professionals
United States	CNS, Catholic News Service
United States	SCCF, SIGNIS Catholic Communicators Forum
United States	USCCB, Department of Communications - CCC
United States/Canada	CPA, Catholic Press Association of the United States and Canada

=== SIGNIS in the Pacific ===
The members of the Pacific are:

Country	member
Australia	ACOFB, Australian Catholic Office for Film and Broadcasting
Fiji	Fiji Media Watch
Guam	Archdiocese of Agaña, Office of Social Communication
Kiribati	St. Paul's Communication Centre
Micronesia	KTVP, Kaselehlie Television Productions
New Caledonia	Archevêché de Nouméa - Médias et communications
Northern Mariana Islands	Diocese of Chalan Kanoa, Diocesan Publications Office
Papua New Guinea	PNG SOCOM, Catholic Commission for Social Communications
Solomon Islands	Catholic Communications Solomon Islands
Tahiti	Studio Tepano Jaussen
Tonga	Toutaimana Catholic Centre
Vanuatu	Katolik Media Senta
Wallis and Futuna	Diocèse de Wallis & Futuna - Média et communications

=== SIGNIS International Members ===
The group of International Members are:

member
ACN, Asian Communications Network
ALER, Asociación Latinoamericana de Educación Radiofónica
Blagovest Media
Chevalier Family
COE, Centro Orientamento Educativo
CREC International
FMJ, Fraternités Monastiques de Jérusalem
Maryknoll World Productions
Kuangchi Program Service
PCN, Paulines Communications Network
Salesians of Don Bosco International
SAT-7 International

=== SIGNIS Associates ===
The members "Associates" are:

Country	member
Croatia	Laudato TV
Ireland	Radharc Films
Italy	Religion Today Festival
Liberia	Radio VERITAS
Spain	Kinema siete, Asociación Cultural

== See also ==
- Catholic television
- Catholic television channels
- Catholic television networks
