= Cameco (disambiguation) =

Cameco can mean several things:

- Cameco Corporation, a Canadian uranium mining company
- Catholic Media Council, a media research and consultancy organizations
- Cameco Industries, a company specializing in sugarcane equipment, including sugarcane harvesters and tractors specialized for sugarcane fields. It was based in Thibodaux, Louisiana, USA and founded in 1965. In 1997, John Deere purchased 49% of the company, and the rest of it in 1998. The Cameco name was retired in 2006.
