= Il rapido sviluppo =

2005 papal letter to communication professionals

Il rapido sviluppo Italian for 'The Rapid Development' Apostolic letter of Pope John Paul II
- Signature date: 24 January 2005
- Original language: Italian
- Text: In original language; In English
- AAS: 97 (3): 265-274

Il rapido sviluppo (The Rapid Development) is an apostolic letter signed by Pope John Paul II on 24 January 2005; it mainly addresses those who are involved in communications.

He signed the letter on January 24, the feast day of Saint Francis de Sales, Patron Saint of Journalists. Commemorating the 40th anniversary of the 1963 decree Inter Mirifica ("The Means of Social Communication"), Pope John Paul II writes about how the message found in Inter Mirifica is strengthened by the development of technical inventions. The Jesuit magazine America referred to the document as "the most authoritative papal statement on the church and communications in nearly 50 years", and aims to make the Church pay "attention to the culture created by communications media".

The document suggests that the internet provides an opportunity for the Church, not just a danger. New communications have helped create a "global village", and the faithful need to take advantage of its possibilities but use them "ethically and responsibly". Proper communication is a moral act, and Christ is an example of a communicator who used all the means available to him to spread the gospel: "The media aid the Church in spreading the Gospel and religious values, promoting dialogue and cooperation, and defending the moral and ethical principles" of the Church, according to John Fagan's summary.

== Background ==
Pope John Paul II was always fascinated by the mass media and used them, especially in his numerous trips around the world, to enhance the image of the Church; French philosopher Jacques Derrida referred to the pope's journeys as " a hegemonic form of testimony and confession". The Rapid Development should be seen, according to Warren Kappeler, as documentation of the pope's interest in mass media and as an attempt to cause the Church to reflect on its importance and its possibilities. The importance of the media to promulgating the message of the Church was seen by John Paul II's successor as well, as noted by Cardinal John Patrick Foley, then President of the Pontifical Council for Social Communications: Foley "noted that the last major document of Pope John Paul II...was on the theme of communications, and one of the first audiences given by Pope Benedict XVI was to the communicators who has [sic] covered the funeral of Pope John Paul II and his own election and beginning days as pope".

== Summary ==
=== 1. Fruitful Progress in the Wake of the Decree Inter Mirifica ===
The pope explains that the Church is called to spread the Gospel and the message of salvation by using contemporary communications which is, “today more than ever”, an important part of the 21st century. Pope John Paul II then explains that we live in “an age of global communication” where we are exposed to different mass media outlets. Pope John Paul II suggests that the mass media reports events with truth and accuracy by means of complete analysis and providing different opinions to the audience.

=== 2. Gospel Reflection and Missionary Commitment ===
The pope suggests that mass media is also in need of being saved by Christ. Pope John Paul II explains that personal and social dialogue has been effected by sin which in turn makes humanity suffer thanks to the separation between man and Christ. The letter then goes on to outline the fact that “the communication between God and humanity has thus reached its perfection in the Word made flesh” Pope John Paul II illustrates to his readers that the Incarnate Word, Jesus, has provided many examples of communication such as explaining scriptures by preaching to those either in the streets or on the mountains, all of which are examples of communicating with God and humanity. The Church uses communication as a tool to spread the “joyful message of salvation”.

=== 3. A Change of Mentality and Pastoral Renewal ===
The pope states that the Church uses communication to help spread religious values and principles and allow for ecumenical and inter-religious dialogue. Pope John Paul II suggests that those in the Church community who “work in the media should be encouraged with pastoral prudence and wisdom” so that they will be able to work professionally as part of the mass media. With the development of mass media, the Church is impelled “towards a sort of pastoral and cultural revision”. Pastors have the responsibility to continue to preach the Gospel so that It continues to permeate society. New technologies, such as the internet, are used as a service by the pastoral community, but Pope John Paul II highlights the importance of traditional means of communication such as new papers, publications, television and radio to be used within the Church community. The reader is reminded that the goal, of using communication as a tool, is to highlight the ethical and moral parts of information. The Church also serves as a place where those who work with the media can renew and develop their abilities to deal with “tensions and ethical dilemmas that arise in their daily work”.

=== 4. The Mass Media, the Crossroads of the Great Social Questions ===
The pope calls the Church to act as a teacher to humanity in their obligations to provide guidelines and prepare them for the rapid development in social communications, in a fashion which is in accordance with God and the Church's beliefs. Today's media practice extreme form of influence to people's way of life, judgements, future actions, attitudes, and viewpoints—therefore it is stated that these communications of media must be regulated and managed organically from “the point of view of formation and ethical responsibility”. Pope John Paul II emphasizes heavily on protecting a person's dignity in using media, which will require a positive development, that has clear structure, since media not only provide for mere entertainment, but has close connections to all areas of human life, i.e. Politics, economy, culture. There are three “fundamental options”) the Church and her members face today: formation, participation, and dialogue. First, the formation of media has to be closely observed and filtered, such as formation of a new vocabulary used widely in media, then spreading to everyday language. Pope John Paul II notes that without “proper formation,”) the media would no longer be serving humanity, but shaping our beliefs and minds. In this, chiefly the younger generation are the most concerned, who would need critical and responsible education on the use of media(11). Second, a true participation by all members are encouraged, in which the Pope calls for a “culture of co-responsibility,” towards handling of media. Lastly, mass media's role of promoting dialogue and as tool of reciprocal knowledge is highlighted. However, this feature is like a double-edged sword, in that if used for good purpose, it can become the most powerful tool in spreading peace and understandings amongst humanity, or, “a destructive weapon”) if it were to be used in a negative manner. Pope John Paul II refers to his predecessors, who have discussed about such features of media we face today, such as Pius XII. Pius XII recognized the value of public opinion within and towards the Church, which is a strong feature of media communications. Also, according to the 1983 Code of Canon Law, everyone has a right to express their opinion. Therefore, John Paul II is telling the readers that his goal of writing such document on media today, isn't aiming for complete control and coercion over the people's mind and opinions. Although the Church must not leave room for arbitrary interpretations of the faith, by no means it is promoting the absolute power of the Church—rather, he notes that the dialogue between the faithful is valued within the Church. John Paul II expands on the promotion of dialogues, yet he notes that although the Church is open to all, there will be times when an “adequate confidentiality” is required for the good of all.

=== 5. To Communicate with the Power of the Holy Spirit ===
As stated in the title, the pope encourages for active individual involvement in seeking help of the Holy Spirit, when faced with challenges brought by or enhanced by media communications, i.e. Strive for power, wealth, birth of conflicts and rivalries, and human weakness. The modern gadgets and technology is growing in a rapid paste, and reaching the nations ever so deeply in forming people's minds today. John Paul II warns that although the spread and the growth of media is to be praised, on the other hand, it has taken away the relationship individuals had that was between mind and mind, and heart and heart. Towards the last bit of the document, Pope John Paul II provides rightful examples and figures of communications in the history of salvation, such as Jesus Christ and the apostle Paul. Jesus is the perfect communicator of the Father, who teaches “that communication is a moral act. The apostle Paul gives advice to those involved in communications, by writing: Therefore, putting away falsehood, speak the truth, each one to his neighbour, for we are members one of another(Eph 4:25, 29). Finally, the pope urges the members of the Church, “Do not be afraid.” Media is just another creation of God, which He has “placed at our disposal to discover, to use and to make known the truth...of his eternal kingdom,” and there is no reason for the faithful individuals to be afraid of attacks and rejections from the world, since Jesus has conquered the world(Jn 16:33). The task left to do with all the social media and communications humanity faces today, is to communicate the message of God and promote Christ's hope, grace and love. Media tools are merely tools of this world, but the eternal perspective of heaven is a perspective which “no communications medium” can ever communicate.

The use of the techniques and technologies of contemporary communications is an integral part of [the Church's] mission in the third millennium.

— Il rapido sviluppo §2

== See also ==
- Inter mirifica
- Communio et progressio
