= Jesús Colina =

Spanish journalist

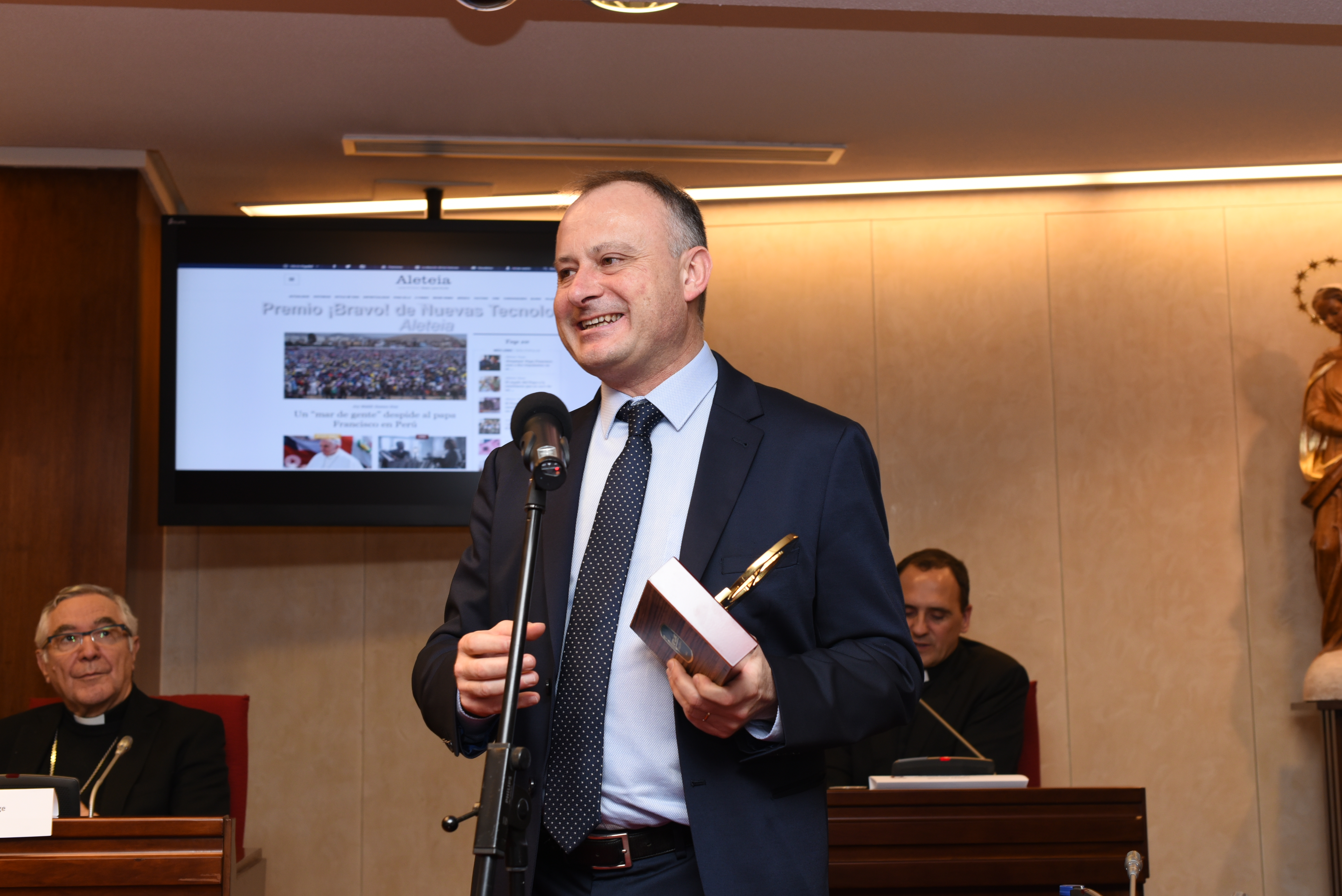
- Born: 1969 (age 56–57); Miranda de Ebro
- Occupations: Religion journalist and editor
- Employer: Aleteia

Jesús Colina (Miranda de Ebro, 1969) is a Spanish journalist who was based in Rome. Having previously led the Zenit News Agency, he currently directs the Aleteia newspaper.

In 1991 he was the editor of the Mexican Proyección Mundial, American Catholic World Report and French Le Temps de l'Eglise. From 1994, he has been the correspondent in Rome for Alfa y Omega, a weekly supplement of the Spanish newspaper ABC. He has also written for Avvenire and the National Catholic Register.

In 1997 Colina founded ZENIT, a Catholic news agency. In 1998 he worked at the Digital Network of the Church in Latin America, RIIAL. In 2007, Pope Benedict XVI appointed Colina consultor to the Pontifical Council for Social Communications. In 2011 he was dismissed from ZENIT by the Legionaries of Christ in order to give the agency a more institutional identity.

That same year he started working on a new project, founding Aleteia, an online Catholic news and information website with the support of the Foundation for Evangelization through the Media. He is the current president and editorial director of Aleteia.

In 2006 Colina received the Servitor Pacis Award at the headquarters of the United Nations in New York for his professional contributions. In 2018 he also received the "Bravo!" award from the Spanish bishops.
