= Pope2you =

Roman Catholic website

- Website type: Religious
- Available in: English; French; German; Italian; Spanish
- Creator: Pontifical Council for Social Communications
- Website: Archived capture of Pope2you.net (21 May 2009)
- Launched: May 25, 2009
- Current status: Inactive

Pope2you was a Web site through which the Pope of the Catholic Church connected with people using Internet social networks and other sites to deliver his messages concerning current affairs, as well as some other important facts or stories.

== Background ==
The site went live on May 25, 2009, on the occasion of the international day of mass media in the Catholic Church. On its first day of existence, the website Pope2you.net received 500,000 visits. In 2012, the Vatican launched the official Twitter profile of the pope, @Pope2YouVatican (the username @Pope2You was already taken). In February 2013, after pope Benedict XVI stepped down, the Facebook app Pope2You was disabled. The Pope2you username was eventually replaced by the more conventional username Pontifex.

Pope2you was developed by the Reverend Paolo Padrini, consultant of the Vatican's Pontifical Council for Social Communications, who had successfully launched iBreviary, an application bringing the book of daily prayers to iPhones.

Today, the website pope2you.net belongs to a network of SEO-related websites, and is not the property of the Vatican anymore.

== Description ==
Pope2you was available in English, German, French, Spanish and Italian. The service was also available through a Facebook page, a Wiki cath and an iPhone app.
