= Vatican's list of films =

1995 listing of 45 great films

In 1995, the Pontifical Council for Social Communications released Alcuni film importanti ('Some Important Films'), a list of 45 films divided into the categories of religion, values, and art. These films were recommended for viewing by Pope John Paul II and John Patrick Foley.

== Compilation ==
The Pontifical Council for Social Communications released a list of 45 films to mark the centennial of Auguste and Louis Lumière's display of their films. These 45 films were divided into the categories of religion, values, and art. This list was released under the title Alcuni film importanti (Some Important Films). President of the Pontifical Council for Social Communications John Patrick Foley, president of the Vatican Film Library Enrique Planas, and twelve experts on film, movie librarians, and academics compiled the list. Pope John Paul II recommended that these films be watched.

== Analysis ==
Foley stated that this list showed that great films could be made without pandering to violent or pornographic elements. He stated that the Church wanted viewers to be more critical of films rather than passively consuming them.

The list features films that contain elements critical of religion and the Catholic Church. The Mission features missionaries being undermined by a church leader. Franco Zeffirelli was critical of the list for not including any of his films.

Florent Cardon, writing for Aleteia, proposed that the Vatican should update the list for 2025, and include films like A Hidden Life and Of Gods and Men.

== List ==
Title	Year	Category	Ref(s)			
Title	Year	Category	Ref(s)	2001: A Space Odyssey	1968	Art
8½	1963	Art				
Andrei Rublev	1966	Religion				
Au revoir les enfants	1987	Values				
Ben-Hur	1959	Religion				
Babette's Feast	1987	Religion				
The Burmese Harp	1956	Values				
Bicycle Thieves	1948	Values				
Chariots of Fire	1981	Values				
Citizen Kane	1941	Art				
Dekalog	1989	Values				
Dersu Uzala	1975	Values				
Fantasia	1940	Art				
The Flowers of St. Francis	1950	Religion				
Francesco	1989	Religion				
Gandhi	1982	Values				
The Gospel According to St. Matthew	1964	Religion				
La Grande Illusion	1937	Art				
Intolerance	1916	Values				
It's a Wonderful Life	1946	Values				
The Lavender Hill Mob	1951	Art				
The Leopard	1963	Art				
Little Women	1933	Art				
A Man for All Seasons	1966	Religion				
Metropolis	1927	Art				
The Mission	1986	Religion				
Modern Times	1936	Art				
Monsieur Vincent	1947	Religion				
Napoléon	1927	Art				
Nazarín	1959	Religion				
Nosferatu	1922	Art				
On the Waterfront	1954	Values				
Ordet	1955	Religion				
The Passion of Joan of Arc	1928	Religion				
Rome, Open City	1945	Values				
The Sacrifice	1986	Religion				
Schindler's List	1993	Values				
The Seventh Seal	1957	Values				
Stagecoach	1939	Art				
La Strada	1954	Art				
Thérèse	1986	Religion				
The Tree of Wooden Clogs	1978	Values				
Vie et Passion du Christ	1903	Religion				
Wild Strawberries	1957	Values				
The Wizard of Oz	1939	Art				

== Works cited ==
=== News ===
- Bose, Swapnil (29 December 2021). "The Vatican named the 45 greatest films of all time". Far Out. Archived from the original on 20 July 2025.
- Cardon, Florent (30 July 2024). "Connaissez-vous ces 45 films recommandés par le Vatican?". Aleteia. Archived from the original on 20 July 2025.
- Gojda, Lukas (23 November 2024). "Popcorn with the Pope: A Guide to the Vatican Film List". Aleteia. Archived from the original on 20 July 2025.
- Murphy, Alyssa (11 March 2024). "The Oscars, 'Oppenheimer' and the Vatican Film List". National Catholic Register. Archived from the original on 20 July 2025.
- Rabai, Carlo (16 July 2020). "I 45 film preferiti dal Vaticano e la polemica con Zeffirelli". Birdmen Magazine. Archived from the original on 20 July 2025.

=== Newspapers ===
- Briggs, David (23 February 1996). "Vatican's best films list includes some surprises". The Saginaw News. p. C4 – via Newspapers.com.
