= Aleteia =

Catholic news and information website

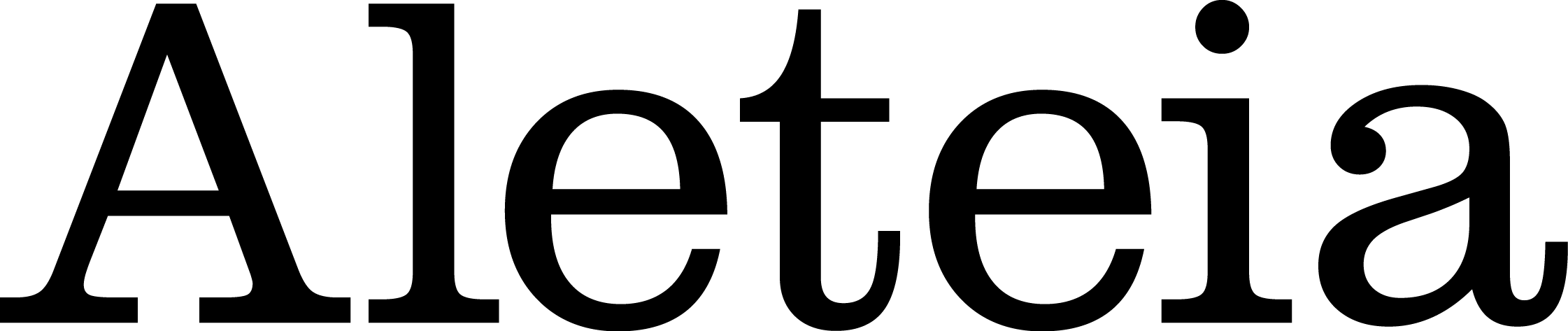
- Type: Online newspaper
- Format: Website
- Founder: Jesús Colina
- Publisher: Foundation for Evangelization through the Media
- President: Pierre-Marie Dumont
- Editor: Fr Peter Cameron (English version)
- Founded: 20 September 2012
- Political alignment: Catholic social teaching
- Language: Multiple languages
- City: Paris
- Website: www.aleteia.org

Aleteia is an online Catholic news and information website founded in 2011/2012 by Jesús Colina via the Foundation for Evangelization through the Media. It has the approval of the Pontifical Council for Social Communications and the Pontifical Council for Promoting the New Evangelization.

The English site is operated under Editor-in-Chief Fr Peter Cameron, OP.

The organization is based in France but operates in different languages and states worldwide. It is distributed in eight languages and editions (English, French, Portuguese, Spanish, Italian, Arabic, Polish and Slovene).
