= Inter mirifica =

One of the Second Vatican Council's magisterial documents

Inter mirifica (lit. 'Among the wonderful' in Latin), subtitled "Decree on the Media of Social Communication", is one of the Second Vatican Council's 16 magisterial documents. The decree aims to address the concerns, problems, and potential of social communication, which it identifies as the press, cinema, television, and other similar types of communication.

The final text of the decree was approved on 24 November 1963 by a vote of 1598 to 503, at the end of the council's second session. This constituted the most "no" votes of any document at the council. It was promulgated by Pope Paul VI on 4 December 1963, after another vote, this time with 1960 in favour and 164 opposed.

== Historical background ==
While Inter mirifica was one of the first decrees to reach a conclusion during Vatican II, the document itself went through many drafts, throughout its development. Over 70 drafts of Inter mirifica were prepared, yet out of all of these drafts, only nine were ready for final approval from the Vatican Council. The first draft Schema of a constitution on the Means of Social Communications, combined with the other six, were made into one volume by July 1962. This draft document consisted of an Introduction (nos 1–5), doctrines of the Church (6-33), the Apostolate of the Church in the field (34-48), the discipline and the ecclesiastical order (49-63), the different means of social communication (64-105), other means of Social Communication (106-111) and a conclusion (112-114). Although the discussion on Inter mirifica lasted for a short period (November 23–27, 1962), the document underwent a drastic change. The final draft, reduced to a quarter of its original length, which contains an introductory section, two short chapters and a conclusion.

== Themes of Inter mirifica ==
The mirifica of the Latin title is more fully expressed in the opening words of the document as "the wonderful technological discoveries which men of talent, especially in the present era, have made with God's help". For the purposes of this document, "the press, movies, radio, television and the like" are singled out as a human achievement which, if properly used, can be laid at the service of mankind.

Its themes include:

- the church's pastoral use of social communications
- the responsibility of the Church to monitor the use of social communications and media and ensure the spiritual well-being of the Church community at large
- the responsibility of the individual to ensure their own well-being and to ensure they are not causing themselves "spiritual harm".
- the responsibility of the media, including those involved in producing media.

== Summary ==
=== Introduction (#1–2) ===
1. The Council states that, with God's help, man has created many means of social communications. These means of social communication can be used to reach all types of people around the world, and can be used to educate and inform. The Catholic Church recognizes that if these tools of social communication be used properly, they can greatly benefit mankind. Conversely, if used improperly, they are incredibly detrimental. The authors state that Inter mirifica will look at the problematic issues of social media, and ways that the Church can fix these problems.

=== Chapter I: On the Teaching of the Church (#3–12) ===
1. The authors of the decree state that it is the Church's "inherent right" to use the means of social communication as a means of preaching the gospel and of spreading salvation.
2. There are three questions of morality within social communications which the authors of the decree look at:
  1. Those who provide the media have an obligation to provide correct, honest, and accurate news about current affairs and events, as the Council believes that access to true and complete information, within the bounds of justice and charity, is a human right. The Council insists that news may only be effectively delivered if the information provided is of a true moral order.
  2. There is a question of morality in relation to the "rights of art" and the norms of morality. The arts are not exempt from "the absolute primacy of the objective moral order".
  3. How should "moral evil" be portrayed within the media? This question is answered by reference to "moral restraint".
3. A series of obligations is outlined in paragraphs 8-12, including a universal obligation (because public opinion includes everyone), but specifically applicable to those who choose to access the media, young people and those who educate them, those who produce the media, and public authorities. A range of professions is listed, including "newsmen, writers, actors, designers, producers, displayers, distributors, operators and sellers, as well as critics". People are advised to ensure that what they allow themselves to listen to, watch, etc. is of good and sound morality. There is an obligation placed on the listener to avoid social communications which could cause "spiritual harm".

=== Chapter II: On the Pastoral Activity of the Church (#13–22) ===
Chapter II of Inter mirifica is concerned with how the church can use the media to support its apostolic or pastoral activities. A note of urgency is mentioned, along with a concern about the potential for "harmful developments". Pastors and lay people with media roles and skills have particular responsibilities.

There is a strong sense of the responsibility and leadership that the Council expected all Church authorities to demonstrate. In doing so, all members of the Church were called to ensure a positive message of the Church in media, as well as a way for authorities to remove any harmful projects as well. These responsibilities include the establishment and promotion of "a truly Catholic press", and the importance of suitable training in media skills for priests, religious and lay people. The document also refers to:

- Teaching the Vatican's ideas of the media and the Church, with younger age groups, within seminaries, and in Catholic schools.
- A wider brief for the Secretariat for the Supervision of Publications and Entertainment, which Pope John XXIII had established in 1960, to include "all media of social communication, including the press", and to include lay people within its membership.
- Bishops' roles in overseeing and guiding media projects in their own dioceses.
- The need for national church offices such as the United States Conference of Catholic Bishops' Office for Film and Broadcasting to take responsibility for supporting Catholic engagement with the media, which must also cooperate at an international level.

The overall relationship between the Catholic Church and the media, to the Vatican Council, is a way to help with the advancement of man's being and their religious journey. Therefore, through the use of media, all individuals are able to learn about the teachings of the Catholic Church and move towards truth and goodness.

=== Conclusions (#23–24) ===
The Council states in its conclusion (Conclusione in the Italian version, translated as "Appendices" in the English translation) that it looks forward to a relationship between Catholic authorities and "all men of goodwill, especially those who have charge of these media", which will result in the use of the media "solely [for] the good of society". The Secretariat for the Supervision of Publications and Entertainment, with its future wider brief, was then invited to issue a further pastoral instruction covering the issues raised in the decree.

== Reception ==
The final text of the decree was approved on 24 November 1963 by a vote of 1598 to 503, at the end of the council's second session. This constituted the most "no" votes of any document at the council. It was promulgated by Pope Paul VI on 4 December 1963, after another vote, this time with 1960 in favour and 164 opposed.

The document's immediate reception was fairly negative. The document was heavily criticized for falling short of expectations, as well as failing to provide any new or different thoughts or instructions on social communications. At the close of the council, in a brief assessment of the documents it had produced, the New York Times said this text had been "generally condemned as inadequate and too conservative". These sentiments have been the long-standing memories of the document, with these sentiments continuing 40 years following the decree.

== Legacy ==
The Nigerian cardinal Francis Arinze has written that the significance of the decree lay less in its contents than in the fact that this was the first time an ecumenical council had "addressed the topic of communications and gave a mandate to clergy and laity on the use of the communications media".

The decree provided the beginning stages for further Church instructions on social communications, with the further documents of Communio et Progressio and Aetatis Novae, and from the document emerged the World Communication Day (in full: World Social Communications Day), which was envisaged by the Council as "a day on which the faithful are instructed in their responsibilities" regarding the media. Pope Paul VI held the first World Communication Day on 7 May 1967, recalling the Council's desire "to draw the attention of her children and of all men of good will to the vast and complex phenomenon of the modem means of social communication, such as the press, motion pictures, radio and television, which form one of the most characteristic notes of modern civilization". Pope John Paul II vigorously promoted responsibility and positive goals in social communications, not only in person but also through messages given on this day, and through supporting the Pontifical Council for Social Communications. The 59th World Social Communications Day took place in May 2025.

The term social communications, apart from its more general use, has become the preferred term within documents of the Catholic Church for reference to media or mass media. It has the advantage, as a term, of wider connotation - all communication is social but not all communication is "mass". In effect, though, the two terms are used synonymously.

=== Later documents ===
In the church's follow-up and expansion of Inter mirifica, the document Communio et progressio was published "by order of the Second Vatican Council" in 1971. A further document, Aetatis Novae, was published in 1992. In 2005, John Paul II wrote his final apostolic letter, The Rapid Development, on the topic of social communications.

In his message "The Priest and Pastoral Ministry in a Digital World: New Media at the Service of the Word" to priests for the 44th World Communications Day (16 May 2010), Pope Benedict XVI called for them to become digital citizens and engage with the information society, saying, "Priests stand at the threshold of a new era: as new technologies create deeper forms of relationship across greater distances, they are called to respond pastorally by putting the media ever more effectively at the service of the Word.... Who better than a priest, as a man of God, can develop and put into practice, by his competence in current digital technology, a pastoral outreach capable of making God concretely present in today's world and presenting the religious wisdom of the past as a treasure which can inspire our efforts to live in the present with dignity while building a better future?"
