= Catholic Media Council =

The Catholic Media Council (CAMECO) is a consultancy specialising in media and communications in Africa, Asia, Latin America, Central and Eastern Europe, the Middle East and the Pacific. CAMECO services, publications and resources aim to contribute to the capacity building of partners and to empower community-oriented media and communication initiatives.

== Services ==
CAMECO services include screen projects, evaluations, planning and change processes, and training courses. These services are offered to local partners, organisations that are active in delivering media assistance, and to donors – including faith-based agencies. The electronic newsletter CAMECO Update describes current activities.

CAMECO also coordinates the start-up phase of the mediaME-Wiki. mediaME was officially launched in September 2009 and is a participatory platform for sharing tools and approaches for media development, monitoring and evaluation. Collaborators include media assistance organisations, researchers, and other media and development practitioners.

== See also ==
- Catholic television
- Catholic television channels
- Catholic television networks
