= Communio et Progressio =

Communio et progressio is a pastoral instruction of the Roman Catholic Church, issued by the Pontifical Council for Social Communications on 23 May 1971. It was prepared in accordance with the Second Vatican Council’s 1963 decree Inter Mirifica. The Council having abandoned the general use of the nihil obstat and imprimatur to approve publications, and of the index to restrict access to undesirable publications, the new pastoral instruction outlined the relations with public media that Church authorities were henceforth to adopt: recognition of the freedom of information and free choice of information, the legitimate independence of the activity of journalists and media institutions, and the need to educate members of the Church in the discriminating use of media.
