= Pontifical Council for Social Communications =

Defunct organization of the Vatican (1948–2016)

- Pontificium Consilium de Communicationibus Socialibus
- Abbreviation: PCSC, PCCS
- Merged into: Secretariat for Communication
- Established: 30 January 1948; 78 years ago
- Founder: Pope Pius XII
- Founded at: Vatican City
- Dissolved: March 2016; 10 years ago
- Purpose: Social communication through mass media and information technology
- Main organ: Commission
- Parent organization: Roman Curia
- Subsidiaries: Vatican Film Library
- Formerly called: Pontifical Commission for the Study and Ecclesiastical Evaluation of Films on Religious or Moral Subjects; Pontifical Commission for Educational and Religious Films; Pontifical Commission for Cinema; Pontifical Commission for the Cinema, Radio and Television; Pontifical Commission for Social Communications

The Pontifical Council for Social Communications (Latin: Pontificium Consilium de Communicationibus Socialibus) was a dicastery of the Roman Curia that was suppressed in March 2016 and merged into the Secretariat for Communication (now the Dicastery for Communication).

According to Pastor bonus, Pope John Paul II's 1988 apostolic constitution on the Roman Curia, the council was "involved in questions regarding the means of social communication, so that, also by these means, human progress and the message of salvation may benefit secular culture and mores." It worked "to encourage and support" the Church and its members in social communication to imbue mass media "with a human and Christian spirit."

== History ==
First established by Pope Pius XII in 1948 and later given wider jurisdiction and new names by successive popes, most recently by John Paul II on 28 June 1988, it was responsible for using mass media to spread the Gospel.

It was established by the Secretariat of State as the Pontifical Commission for the Study and Ecclesiastical Evaluation of Films on Religious or Moral Subjects and was renamed the Pontifical Commission for Educational and Religious Films later that year. The commission was renamed to the Pontifical Commission for Cinema in 1952, to the Pontifical Commission for the Cinema, Radio and Television in 1954, and became a permanent office of the Secretariat of State in 1959. It was reorganized as the Pontifical Commission for Social Communications in April 1964. The commission was renamed Pontifical Council for Social Communications and promoted to a dicastery of the Roman Curia in March 1989. The council was suppressed in March 2016.

== Publications ==
The PCSC and its predecessor bodies have published a number of statements on various topics connected with social communications, including:

- Communio et progressio (pastoral instruction). 23 May 1971. Written "by order of the Second Vatican Council".
- Kappeler, Warren Anthony (7 May 1989). Pornography and violence in the communications media: a pastoral response. ISBN 9781433105432. OCLC 718088151.
- Aetatis Novae (pastoral instruction). 22 February 1992.
- 100 Years of Cinema. October 1996.
- Kappeler, Warren Anthony (22 February 1997). Ethics in Advertising. ISBN 9781433105432. OCLC 47657206.
- Kappeler, Warren Anthony (2 June 2000). Ethics in Communication. ISBN 9781433105432. OCLC 838938585.
- The Church and Internet. 28 February 2002. ISBN 9788820972783.
- Ethics in Internet. 28 February 2002. ISBN 9788820972820.
- Temas candentes. Respeto a la vida. Pornografía y violencia - Vida artificial - Homosexualidad. (1989). Vatican City: Ediciones Paulinas/ Editorial Salesiana.

In addition, the PCSC helped to draft John Paul II's 2005 apostolic letter The Rapid Development, on technological changes in the media.

== List of presidents ==
- 1948–1971: Martin John O'Connor
- 1969–1971: Agostino Ferrari Toniolo as pro-president
- 1971–1973: Edward Louis Heston
- 1973–1984: Andrzej Maria Deskur
- 1984–2007: John Patrick Foley
- 2007–2016: Claudio Maria Celli

== See also ==
- Holy See
- Holy See Press Office
- Index of Vatican City–related articles
- News.va
- The Vatican Today News Portal
- Vatican's list of films
- Vatican Television Center
