= Deaths in January 2015 =

The following is a list of notable deaths in January 2015.

Entries for each day are listed alphabetically by surname. A typical entry lists information in the following sequence:

- Name, age, country of citizenship and reason for notability, established cause of death, reference.

== January 2015 ==
=== 1 ===
- Barbara Atkinson, 88, British actress (Z-Cars).
- Staryl C. Austin, 94, American air force brigadier general.
- Ulrich Beck, 70, German sociologist, heart attack.
- Fiona Cumming, 77, British television director (Doctor Who).
- Eric Cunningham, 65, Canadian politician, Ontario MPP for Wentworth North (1975–1984).
- Mario Cuomo, 82, American politician, Governor of New York (1983–1994), heart failure.
- Donna Douglas, 82, American actress (The Beverly Hillbillies, Frankie and Johnny, The Twilight Zone), pancreatic cancer.
- Matthew Franjola, 72, American journalist (Associated Press) and photographer.
- Jeff Golub, 59, American guitarist, progressive supranuclear palsy.
- Jack Howell, 88, British physician.
- Omar Karami, 80, Lebanese politician, Prime Minister (1990–1992, 2004–2005).
- Bill Keating, 70, American football player (Denver Broncos, Miami Dolphins) and attorney.
- Tore Helge Larsen, 69, Norwegian harness racer, cancer.
- Géry Leuliet, 104, French Roman Catholic prelate, world's oldest Catholic bishop, Bishop of Amiens (1963–1985).
- Boris Morukov, 64, Russian physician and cosmonaut, STS-106 mission specialist.
- Kjell Noreik, 85, Norwegian physician.
- Mrunalini Devi Puar, 83, Indian educator, Chancellor of the Maharaja Sayajirao University of Baroda (since 1988).
- Ninón Sevilla, 93, Cuban-born Mexican actress (Aventurera, La usurpadora), heart attack.
- William Lloyd Standish, 84, American federal judge, District Court Judge for the Western District of Pennsylvania (1987–2002).
- Manasa Vaniqi, 62, Fijian civil servant and lieutenant colonel, Permanent Secretary for Sugar (since 2009).
- Miller Williams, 84, American poet, Alzheimer's disease.

=== 2 ===
- Per-Olof Åstrand, 92, Swedish physiologist.
- James A. Barlow, 91, American politician, member of the Wyoming House of Representatives (1983–1987).
- Charles Baur, 85, French politician, President of the Regional Council of Picardy (1976–1978, 1985–2004).
- Noel Cobb, 76, American-born British philosopher, psychologist and author.
- Ferdinand T. Day, 96, American civil rights activist and educator.
- Little Jimmy Dickens, 94, American country music singer ("May the Bird of Paradise Fly Up Your Nose"), cardiac arrest.
- Baldina Di Vittorio, 94, Italian politician.
- Danny Dunton, 90, English speedway rider and promoter.
- Maurice Fontaine, 95, French politician.
- Bob Gilmore, 53, British musicologist.
- Vasant Gowarikar, 81, Indian scientist and ISRO chairman, dengue and urinary tract infection.
- Basil Hansen, 88, Australian Olympic ice hockey player (1960).
- Lloyd House, 83, American politician, member of the Arizona House of Representatives (1967–1968).
- Lam Pou-chuen, 63, Hong Kong dubbing artist (Doraemon), diabetes.
- Suzanne Lapointe, 80, Canadian singer and actress, lymphoma.
- Abu Anas al-Libi, 50, Libyan al-Qaeda member in United States custody, liver cancer.
- John McQuilten, 65, Australian politician, member of the Victorian Legislative Council for Ballarat (1999–2006).
- Seiko Mikami, 53, Japanese artist, cancer.
- Derek Minter, 82, British Grand Prix motorcycle and short-circuit road racer.
- Arthur Neu, 81, American politician, Lieutenant Governor of Iowa (1973–1979), member of the Iowa Senate (1967–1973).
- Tihomir Novakov, 85, Serbian-born American physicist.
- Billy O'Neill, 85, Irish sportsman.
- István Pásztor, 89, Hungarian Olympic cyclist (1952).
- Dan Poulin, 57, Canadian ice hockey player (Minnesota North Stars), cancer.
- Arpád Račko, 84, Hungarian-born Slovak sculptor.
- Vincent Cartledge Reddish, 88, Scottish astronomer, Astronomer Royal for Scotland (1975–1980).
- Kristian Sundtoft, 77, Norwegian politician.

=== 3 ===
- Jamal Uddin Ahmad, 85, Bangladeshi politician, Deputy Prime Minister (1977–1982).
- Daniel Albright, 69, American academic.
- Martin Anderson, 78, American economist and political adviser.
- Adunni Bankole, 55, Nigerian businesswoman, heart attack.
- Henry A. Bent, 88, American physical chemist.
- Edward Brooke, 95, American politician, member of the U.S. Senate from Massachusetts (1967–1979).
- Bryan Caldwell, 54, American football player (Houston Oilers), Hodgkin's lymphoma.
- Paulinus Costa, 78, Bangladeshi Roman Catholic prelate, Archbishop of Dhaka (2005–2011), heart attack.
- Maher Hathout, 79, Egyptian-born American Islamic leader, cancer.
- Dwight Hooker, 86, American photographer (Playboy) and architect.
- Bill Jessup, 85, American football player (San Francisco 49ers).
- Rueben Philip Job, 86, American United Methodist prelate, Bishop of the Iowa episcopal area (1984–1992).
- Ivan Jullien, 80, French jazz trumpeter.
- Muath al-Kasasbeh, 26, Jordanian fighter pilot and ISIS hostage, burned alive.
- Roger Kitter, 65, British actor ('Allo 'Allo!) and entertainer, cancer.
- Olga Knyazeva, 60, Russian fencer, Olympic champion (1976).
- Doug Luke, 85, English photographer.
- Willy Ovesen, 90, Norwegian civil servant.
- Gene-Ann Polk, 88, American physician.
- David Purves, 90, Scottish environmental scientist and writer.
- Terence Ranger, 85, British historian.
- Jaime Romero Móran, 21, Mexican gymnast, shot.
- Allie Sherman, 91, American football player (Philadelphia Eagles) and coach (New York Giants).
- Jouko Törmänen, 60, Finnish ski jumper, Olympic champion (1980).

=== 4 ===
- Chang Sung-hwan, 94, South Korean lieutenant general and diplomat, Chief of Staff of the Air Force (1962–1964), natural causes.
- Elisabetta Catalano, 70, Italian fine-art photographer.
- Pino Daniele, 59, Italian singer and songwriter, heart attack.
- Chitresh Das, 70, Indian dancer, instructor and choreographer, aneurysm.
- Al Delugach, 89, American Pulitzer Prize-winning reporter, mesothelioma.
- Lance Diamond, 69, American singer, heart complications.
- Jay Furman, 72, American real estate developer, cancer.
- He Zhenliang, 85, Chinese politician and diplomat.
- Dan Held, 53, Canadian ice hockey player.
- Gene Kemp, 88, British children's author (The Turbulent Term of Tyke Tiler).
- Haroldo Lara, 80, Brazilian Olympic swimmer (1952, 1956).
- Azizullah Lodin, 75–76, Afghan politician.
- Donald MacLeod, 76, Canadian Olympic cross-country skier.
- John McPhee, 77, Scottish footballer (Blackpool, Motherwell).
- Stu Miller, 87, American baseball player (San Francisco Giants, Baltimore Orioles).
- Juan Isidro Moreno, 90, Dominican Republic poet.
- Hasan Hazer Moshar, 91, Iranian artist.
- Jack Parr, 78, American basketball player (Cincinnati Royals).
- Natalino Pescarolo, 85, Italian Roman Catholic prelate, Bishop of Fossano (1992–2005) and Cuneo (1999–2005).
- Hank Peters, 90, American baseball executive (Baltimore Orioles), complications from a stroke.
- Ahuti Prasad, 57, Indian actor, colon cancer.
- Ives Roqueta, 78, French Occitan author.
- Eli Sagan, 87, American clothing manufacturer, cultural anthropology author and Nixon Enemy.
- Stuart Scott, 49, American sports journalist (SportsCenter), appendix cancer.
- Michele Serros, 48, American novelist and poet, adenocarcinoma of the salivary gland.
- Mário Simas, 92, Portuguese Olympic swimmer.
- Nelson Torno, 87, Argentine Olympic sports shooter.
- Upendra Trivedi, 78, Indian actor and director.
- Richard D. Veltri, 79, American politician, member of the Connecticut House of Representatives.
- René Vautier, 86, French film director (Avoir 20 ans dans les Aurès).
- Bernard Williams, 72, British film producer (A Clockwork Orange, Daredevil, Flash Gordon), cancer.
- Edmund Wnuk-Lipiński, 70, Polish academic.
- János Zsombolyai, 75, Hungarian cinematographer, film director and screenwriter.

=== 5 ===
- Joy Ali, 36, Fijian middleweight boxer, suicide.
- Philippe Baillet, 74, French Olympic basketball player.
- Allan Beard, 95, British civil servant.
- Jean-Pierre Beltoise, 77, French Formula One racing driver, winner of the 1972 Monaco Grand Prix, stroke.
- Al Bendich, 85, American civil rights attorney.
- Khan Bonfils, 42, English actor (Star Wars: Episode I – The Phantom Menace, Batman Begins, Skyfall).
- Jim Burton, 53, Canadian ice hockey player (Hershey Bears) and coach, heart attack.
- Jack Calmes, 71, American inventor, executive and musician.
- Eylül Cansın, 24, Turkish transgender woman, suicide by jumping.
- Bobby Carter, 75, American politician, member of the Tennessee Senate (1995–2002).
- William R. Catton Jr., 88, American environmental sociologist.
- Arthur E. Chase, 84, American politician, member of the Massachusetts Senate (1991–1995).
- Albert Firth, 77, English rugby league player (Wakefield Trinity).
- Antonio Fuertes, 85, Spanish footballer (Valencia, Elche).
- Vadim Glovatsky, 45, Kazakhstani Olympic ice hockey player (1998), (Metallurg Magnitogorsk).
- Joe Haines, 91, American politician, member of the Ohio House of Representatives (1981–1999).
- Ken Hale, 75, English football player and manager.
- Niels Hansen, 90, German diplomat.
- Milton Hebald, 97, American sculptor.
- Martin Joseph, 65, Trinidadian politician, Minister of National Security (2003–2010), drowned.
- Mustafa Kamal, 81, Bangladeshi judge, Chief Justice (1999), heart disease.
- Anthony Ledwith, 81, British chemist.
- Earl MacNaughton, 95, Canadian physicist.
- Bernard Joseph McLaughlin, 102, American Roman Catholic prelate, Auxiliary Bishop of Buffalo (1968–1988).
- Harold Murphy, 76, American politician, member of the Illinois House of Representatives (1993–2003).
- Ganesh Patro, 69, Indian playwright and screenwriter, cancer.
- Alfons Peeters, 71, Belgian footballer.
- Joan Peters, 78, American author (From Time Immemorial), complications from a stroke.
- King Sporty, 71, Jamaican-American reggae musician.
- Geoff Truett, 79, English footballer (Crystal Palace).

=== 6 ===
- Ivor Abrahams, 79, British sculptor and ceramicist.
- Anton Amann, 58, Austrian chemist.
- Else M. Barth, 86, Norwegian philosopher.
- Vlastimil Bubník, 83, Czech ice hockey player and footballer, Olympic bronze medalist (1964).
- Buffalo Tiger, 94, American politician, Chairman of the Miccosukee Tribe of Indians of Florida (1962–1985).
- Joseph Djida, 69, Cameroonian Roman Catholic prelate, Bishop of Ngaoundéré (since 2000).
- Johannes de Villiers Graaff, 86, South African economist.
- Lawrence Gushee, 83, American musicologist.
- Jean Hendriks, 89, Dutch politician, member of the Senate (1981–1991).
- Francesca Hilton, 67, American actress and socialite, stroke.
- Ron Hovey, 82, Australian football player (Geelong).
- Arthur Jackson, 96, American sports shooter.
- Sir John Mason, 91, British meteorologist.
- George H. McKee, 91, American air force lieutenant general.
- Lance Percival, 81, British actor (That Was the Week That Was, The Beatles) and singer ("Shame and Scandal in the Family").
- Gilberto Perez, 71, Cuban-born American professor of film studies.
- Sanford E. Reisenbach, 82, American marketing executive (Warner Bros.).
- Patricia Roppel, 76, American historian and teacher, specialist in the history of Southeast Alaska, cancer.
- Thunder Rumble, 26, American Thoroughbred racehorse, complications from colic.
- Alexandru Segal, 67, Romanian-born Brazilian economist and chess player.

=== 7 ===
- Subhas Anandan, 67, Indian-born Singaporean lawyer, heart failure.
- José Arias, 92, Spanish Olympic alpine skier (1948).
- Tim Arson, 38, American professional wrestler (WWC, ECW).
- Ricardo Bueno Fernández, 74, Spanish politician, member of the Senate (1977–1979, 1993–2000) and Congress of Deputies (2000–2004).
- John Burritt, 80, American Olympic biathlete.
- Ingvar Eriksson, 70, Swedish Olympic swimmer.
- Gilbert Finn, 94, Canadian businessman, Lieutenant Governor of New Brunswick (1987–1994).
- Michael Fisher, 68, British solicitor, cancer.
- Tadeusz Konwicki, 88, Polish writer and filmmaker.
- Mompati Merafhe, 78, Botswanan lieutenant general and politician, Vice President (2008–2012).
- Arch A. Moore Jr., 91, American politician, Governor of West Virginia (1969–1977, 1985–1989).
- J. P. Parisé, 73, Canadian ice hockey player (Minnesota North Stars), lung cancer.
- Jethro Pugh, 70, American football player (Dallas Cowboys).
- Archie Radebe, 55, South African footballer (AmaZulu) and coach.
- B. S. Abdur Rahman, 87, Indian business executive and philanthropist (B. S. Abdur Rahman University).
- David Rolfe, 50, Australian Paralympic swimmer, complications relating to heart surgery.
- Julio Scherer García, 88, Mexican journalist, septic shock.
- Herb Simpson, 94, American baseball player (Seattle Steelheads).
- Rod Taylor, 84, Australian actor (The Time Machine, The Birds, 101 Dalmatians, Inglourious Basterds), heart attack.
- Nancy Thomas, 96, British television producer (Monitor).
- Notable French people killed in the Charlie Hebdo shooting:
  - Cabu, 76, cartoonist
  - Elsa Cayat, 54, psychoanalyst and columnist
  - Charb, 47, caricaturist and journalist
  - Philippe Honoré, 73, cartoonist
  - Bernard Maris, 68, economist and journalist
  - Tignous, 57, cartoonist
  - Georges Wolinski, 80, cartoonist

=== 8 ===
- Argila, 92, Spanish footballer.
- William E. Boeing Jr., 92, American businessman.
- Andraé Crouch, 72, American gospel singer, heart attack.
- Kep Enderby, 88, Australian politician and judge, MP (1970–1975), Supreme Court Justice of New South Wales (1982–1992).
- Patsy Garrett, 93, American singer and actress (Benji, Nanny and the Professor, Room 222).
- Jean-Claude Gasigwa, 31, Rwandan tennis player (Davis Cup team).
- Peter Hill, 83, English footballer (Coventry City).
- Jenő Lasztovicza, 53, Hungarian politician, MP (since 1998).
- Curtis Lee, 75, American singer ("Pretty Little Angel Eyes"), cancer.
- Hubert Markl, 76, German biologist.
- Ray McFall, 88, British nightclub owner (The Cavern Club).
- Roy McKie, 93, American illustrator.
- Richard Meade, 76, British equestrian, three-time Olympic champion, cancer.
- Remo Pianezzi, 87, Swiss cyclist.
- Henryk Podlewski, 94, Polish psychiatrist.
- Leif Rantala, 67, Finnish linguist.
- Erbey Satterfield, 75, American politician, member of the Utah House of Representatives.
- Egil Toreng, 92, Norwegian newspaper editor and politician.
- Nelson Townsend, 73, American athletic director (Florida A&M), heart attack.

=== 9 ===
- Angelo Anquilletti, 71, Italian footballer (A.C. Milan, national team).
- Jasodhara Bagchi, 77, Indian feminist critic and academic.
- Amedy Coulibaly, 32, French jihadist, shot.
- Harry A. DeMaso, 93, American politician, member of the Michigan Senate (1967–1986).
- Samuel Goldwyn Jr., 88, American film producer (The Secret Life of Walter Mitty, Master and Commander: The Far Side of the World, The Preacher's Wife), heart failure.
- Ah Chew Goo, 96, American basketball player and coach (University of Hawaii).
- Jack Greenwood, 88, American hurdler.
- Michel Jeury, 80, French science fiction author.
- Sonny Karnofsky, 92, American football player (Philadelphia Eagles).
- Robert V. Keeley, 85, American diplomat, Ambassador to Mauritius (1976–1978), Zimbabwe (1980–1984) and Greece (1985–1989), stroke.
- Sarah Kemp, 77, Australian actress (Sons and Daughters), lung cancer.
- Chuck Locke, 82, American baseball player (Baltimore Orioles).
- Frans Molenaar, 74, Dutch fashion designer, complications from a fall.
- Józef Oleksy, 68, Polish politician, Prime Minister (1995–1996), cancer.
- Bud Paxson, 79, American media executive, co-founder of the Home Shopping Network, founder of Pax TV.
- Peder Pedersen, 69, Danish track cyclist, Olympic champion (1968).
- Abdul Rahman Ya'kub, 87, Malaysian politician, Chief Minister of Sarawak (1970–1981).
- Whitney Reed, 82, American tennis player.
- James L. Reveal, 73, American botanist.
- Robert Scott, 73, American author.
- Iqbal Shaikh, 80, Pakistani cricketer.
- Bud Sherman, 88, Canadian politician, member of the Legislative Assembly of Manitoba (1969–1984), member of the House of Commons (1965–1968).
- Miroslav Soviš, 60, Czech Olympic biathlete.
- Paul M. Starnes, 80, American politician, member of the Tennessee House of Representatives (1972–1990).
- Roy Tarpley, 50, American basketball player (Dallas Mavericks).
- Dottie Thomas, 92, American hematologist.
- Christian Vannequé, 65, French sommelier and restaurateur.
- Sharon Zukowski, 59-60, American author (The Hour of the Knife).

=== 10 ===
- John Angus, 66, New Zealand children's rights advocate, children's commissioner (2009–2011).
- Jorgelina Aranda, 72, Argentine model and actress (Il Gaucho).
- Robert Berner, 79, American geologist and geochemist.
- Walter Berns, 95, American constitutional law and political philosophy professor.
- Frans Bolweg, 64, Dutch sailor and coach.
- Brian Clemens, 83, British screenwriter (Dr. Jekyll and Sister Hyde) and television producer (The Avengers, The Professionals).
- Abed Daoudieh, 94, Jordanian politician, Awqaf and Islamic Affairs Minister (1984).
- George Dickerson, 81, American actor (Blue Velvet, Hill Street Blues).
- James R. Dixon, 86, American herpetologist.
- Tim Drummond, 74, American bassist (Bob Dylan, Neil Young).
- Pierre-André Fournier, 71, Canadian Roman Catholic prelate, Archbishop of Rimouski (since 2008).
- Elemér Hankiss, 86, Hungarian sociologist.
- Maeve Hillery, 91, Irish physician.
- Jim Hogan, 81, Irish Olympic long-distance runner, European champion (1966).
- Harry V. Jaffa, 96, American political philosophy professor.
- Annis Jensen, 93, American roller derby skater.
- Frederik H. Kreuger, 86, Dutch high voltage scientist.
- Junior Malanda, 20, Belgian footballer (VfL Wolfsburg, national under-21 team), traffic collision.
- Marko Marin, 84, Slovenian theatre director and art historian.
- Slobodan Martinović, 70, Serbian chess player.
- Roger Moyer, 80, American politician, Mayor of Annapolis, Maryland (1965–1973), Parkinson's disease.
- Yoko Nagae Ceschina, 82, Japanese classical music philanthropist.
- Taylor Negron, 57, American comedian and actor (Angels in the Outfield, Fast Times at Ridgemont High, Bio-Dome), liver cancer.
- Margit Nünke, 84, German fashion model, actress and beauty queen.
- Ged Peck, 67, English musician.
- Hugh Peery, 83, American Olympic wrestler.
- George Probert, 87, American jazz musician and music editor.
- Francesco Rosi, 92, Italian film director (The Mattei Affair, Christ Stopped at Eboli, Salvatore Giuliano).
- Francis Simard, 67, Canadian revolution activist and criminal, aneurysm.
- Edward B. Singleton, 94, American pediatric radiologist.
- Hans Stoiber, 96, Austrian poet.
- Robert Stone, 77, American novelist (Dog Soldiers), chronic obstructive pulmonary disease.
- Denis Tsygurov, 43, Russian professional ice hockey player (Buffalo Sabres, Los Angeles Kings).
- Inge Vermeulen, 30, Brazilian-born Dutch field hockey player (national team), European champion (2009).
- Roger Wosahlo, 67, English footballer (Peterborough), cancer.
- Renae Youngberg, 81, American baseball player (Grand Rapids Chicks).

=== 11 ===
- Felix Badcock, 79-80, British rower.
- Jenő Buzánszky, 89, Hungarian footballer (Dorogi FC, national team), Olympic champion (1952), last living member of the Golden Team.
- Gary Dighton, 46, British Olympic cyclist, suicide.
- Doriemus, 24, New Zealand Thoroughbred racehorse, Melbourne Cup winner (1995), euthanised following paddock accident.
- Anita Ekberg, 83, Swedish-Italian actress (La Dolce Vita, Paris Holiday, Back from Eternity).
- Chashi Nazrul Islam, 73, Bangladeshi filmmaker (Ora Egaro Jon).
- Chic Littlewood, 84, British-born New Zealand television personality and actor (King Kong, 30 Days of Night).
- Jacqueline Martel, 88, French Olympic alpine skier.
- Albert McPherson, 87, English football player (Walsall) and coach (West Bromwich Albion).
- Vernon Benjamin Mountcastle, 96, American professor emeritus (Johns Hopkins School of Medicine) and neuroscientist.
- Fritz Pott, 75, German football player and coach.
- Bruno Visintin, 82, Italian boxer, Olympic bronze medalist (1952).
- Ryszard Zub, 80, Polish fencer, Olympic silver (1956, 1960) and bronze (1964) medalist.

=== 12 ===
- John Bayley, 89, British literary critic and writer.
- Bonnie Christensen, 63, American children's book author and illustrator, ovarian cancer.
- Germán Cobos, 87, Spanish actor.
- Trevor Colbourn, 87, Australian educator and academic, President of the University of Central Florida (1978–1989).
- James Naanman Daman, 58, Nigerian Roman Catholic prelate, Bishop of Jalingo (2000–2007) and Shendam (since 2007).
- Stephen Gold, 58, British computer journalist, complications from heart surgery.
- Sandor Gombay, 76, Swiss Olympic fencer.
- Robert Gover, 85, American author.
- Keiko Hanagata, 79, Japanese voice actress.
- John Hill, 69, American game designer, heart failure.
- Horrie Kessey, 87, Australian rugby footballer.
- Akira Kinoshita, 78, Japanese photographer.
- Carl Long, 79, American baseball player.
- William C. Martel, 59, American political scientist, cancer.
- A. J. Masters, 64, American singer and songwriter, prostate cancer.
- Paul Morgan, 40, Welsh rugby union and league player.
- Elena Obraztsova, 75, Russian mezzo-soprano.
- Alex Omes, 43, American nightlife impresario, co-founder of Ultra Music Festival.
- John Paice, 83, Australian rules footballer (Carlton).
- V. B. Rajendra Prasad, 82, Indian film producer and director.
- Gabriel Ramushwana, 73, South African general, Head of State of Venda (1990–1994), colon cancer.
- Ed Skinner, 78, American politician and attorney, member of the Iowa House of Representatives (1969–1973).
- Bill Thompson, 70, American talent manager, heart attack.
- Darrell Winfield, 85, American rancher and model, Marlboro Man (1968–1989).
- David Wyatt, 65, American politician, cancer.

=== 13 ===
- Robert Boon, 98, Dutch-born American actor (Queen of Blood, Verboten!, The Twilight Zone).
- Chuck Burr, 91, American football executive, general manager for the Miami Dolphins.
- Tony Ciprian, 82, New Zealand television sports presenter and producer.
- Doug Cunningham, 69, American football player (Ole Miss Rebels, San Francisco 49ers).
- Robert Dotson, 91, American flatfoot dancer.
- Kinuko Emi, 91, Japanese painter, heart failure.
- Ralph Faudree, 75, American mathematician.
- Frank Glazer, 99, American pianist and composer.
- Sir Jack Hayward, 91, English businessman, property developer and philanthropist, president of Wolverhampton Wanderers.
- Mark Juddery, 43, Australian author and journalist, cancer.
- H. Wesley Kenney, 89, American television director and producer (General Hospital, All in the Family, The Young and the Restless), cardiac arrest.
- Pearl King, 96, British psychanalyst.
- Mike Marqusee, 61, American-born writer and activist, multiple myeloma.
- Frank Mazzola, 79, American film actor and editor (Rebel Without a Cause, Casablanca, The Hunchback of Notre Dame).
- Hara Patnaik, 56, Indian actor and film director, cancer.
- Ronnie Ronalde, 91, British music hall singer and siffleur.
- Isabel Rosado, 107, Puerto Rican independence activist (Puerto Rican Nationalist Party).
- John H. Rubel, 94, American defense electronics executive.
- Trevor Ward-Davies, 70, English pop bassist (Dave Dee, Dozy, Beaky, Mick & Tich).
- Jane Wilson, 90, American painter.
- Keith Wright, 73, Australian politician and convicted child rapist, MP for Capricornia (1984–1993).
- Hillel Zaks, 85, Polish-born Israeli rabbi.

=== 14 ===
- Mordechai Shmuel Ashkenazi, 71, Israeli rabbi.
- Bob Boyd, 84, American basketball coach (USC Trojans).
- Jerry Dempsey, 81, American politician, member of the Minnesota House of Representatives (1992–2006).
- Bill Dodd, 78, English footballer (Burnley F.C.).
- Lotte Hass, 86, Austrian model and underwater diver.
- Val Holten, 87, Australian cricketer.
- Jerzy Holzer, 84, Polish historian.
- Danny Malloy, 84, Scottish footballer (Cardiff City, Dundee).
- Willy Pfister, 86, Swiss Olympic ice hockey player.
- Susanto Pudjomartono, 71, Indonesian newspaper editor and diplomat, second chief editor of The Jakarta Post (1991–2003), Ambassador to Russia (2003–2008).
- Lester J. Reed, 90, American biochemist.
- Nélida Romero, 88, Argentine actress.
- Darren Shahlavi, 42, English actor (Night at the Museum, Watchmen, Ip Man 2) and martial artist, heart attack.
- Obrad Sretenović, 79, Croatian Olympic boxer.
- Layne Tom Jr., 87, American actor (Charlie Chan series).
- Warren Weinstein, 73, American economist, USAID contractor kidnapped by al-Qaeda, drone strike.
- Robert E. White, 88, American diplomat, United States Ambassador to Paraguay (1977–1980) and El Salvador (1980–1981).
- Zhang Wannian, 86, Chinese general.

=== 15 ===
- Charles Kennedy, 8th Marquess of Ailsa, 58, Scottish peer, hereditary chief of Clan Kennedy.
- Bai Jinian, 88, Chinese politician, party chief of Shaanxi Province.
- Jean-Claude Baker, 71, French-born American restaurateur, suicide.
- Ludmila Brožová-Polednová, 93, Czech prosecutor, participated in the show trial of Milada Horáková.
- Arnaldo Calveyra, 85, Argentine poet and novelist, heart attack.
- Eugene E. Covert, 88, American aeronautics engineer.
- Ervin Drake, 95, American songwriter ("It Was a Very Good Year", "I Believe", "Good Morning Heartache"), bladder cancer.
- Kim Fowley, 75, American record producer, band manager (The Runaways), impresario and musician, bladder cancer.
- Alan Hirschfield, 79, American film executive, CEO of Columbia Pictures (1973–1978), Chairman of 20th Century Fox (1982–1986).
- Mirko Holbus, 74, Serbian Olympic ice hockey player.
- Anwarul Iqbal, 64, Bangladeshi politician and police chief, cardiac arrest.
- Ethel Lang, 114, British supercentenarian.
- Karel Lichtnégl, 78, Czech football player.
- Jean Lindenmann, 90, Swiss virologist and immunologist, co-discoverer of interferon.
- Rimma Markova, 89, Russian actress.
- Ray Nagel, 87, American football player (UCLA Bruins) and coach (Utah Utes, Iowa Hawkeyes).
- Chikao Ohtsuka, 85, Japanese voice actor (Lupin III, Sonic the Hedgehog, One Piece), ischemic heart failure.
- Raoul Pantin, 71, Trinidadian journalist, playwright, and screenwriter (Bim), survivor of the Jamaat al Muslimeen coup attempt.
- Robert S. Pirie, 80, American lawyer.
- Ignacio Posada, 79, Colombian Olympic fencer.
- Harvey Sweetman, 93, New Zealand World War II pilot.
- Rameshwar Thakur, 88, Indian politician, Governor of Odisha (2004–2006), Andhra Pradesh (2006–2007) and Karnataka (2007–2009).
- Walter Westbrook, 93, South African artist.
- Bob Wilson, 85, American sportscaster (Boston Bruins).
- Joseph Mukasa Zuza, 59, Malawian Roman Catholic prelate, Bishop of Mzuzu (since 1995), traffic collision.

=== 16 ===
- Miriam Akavia, 87, Israeli writer.
- Sir Ian Athfield, 74, New Zealand architect, pneumonia.
- Mohamed Olow Barrow, Somali politician.
- Andrew Benson, 97, American biologist.
- José Carrasco, 71, Peruvian politician, Minister of Energy and Mines (1988–1989) and member of the Congress (2006–2011), lung cancer.
- Vivaldo Frota, 86, Brazilian politician, Governor of Amazonas (1990–1991).
- Ted Harrison, 88, British-born Canadian painter.
- Pedro María Iguaran, 74, Spanish footballer (Real Sociedad).
- Patrick Journoud, 50, French Olympic athlete (1988).
- Stuart Loory, 82, American journalist and media executive (CNN), lung cancer.
- Ray Lumpp, 91, American basketball player (New York Knicks), Olympic champion (1948).
- Luis Marsans, 84, Spanish painter.
- Louis Martin, 78, Jamaican-born British weightlifter, Olympic silver (1964) and bronze (1960) medallist.
- Ghelubhai Nayak, 91, Indian political activist.
- Walter Peregoy, 89, American animator (The Jungle Book, Sleeping Beauty, Mary Poppins, The Sword in the Stone).
- Tony Ridler, 59, Welsh darts player.
- Faith Seidenberg, 91, American attorney and civil rights activist.
- Yao Beina, 33, Chinese singer, breast cancer.

=== 17 ===
- Bruno Ballarini, 77, Italian footballer (Calcio Como).
- Walter Bauza, 75, Argentine Olympic sports shooter.
- Joseph Brannigan, 83, American politician, member of the Maine Senate (2006–2012).
- Marie Foucher-Creteau, 89, French Olympic swimmer.
- Ken Furphy, 83, English footballer and manager (Watford).
- George W. Grace, 93, American linguist.
- Gobinda Halder, 84, Indian lyricist and composer, kidney failure.
- Faten Hamama, 83, Egyptian actress (The Angel of Mercy, Wajh al-Qamar).
- Don Harron, 90, Canadian comedian, actor and author (Hee Haw, The Big Revue), cancer.
- Charles Lee Harrison, 93, American lieutenant colonel.
- Martha Whitmore Hickman, 89, American author.
- Kazumasa Hirai, 76, Japanese manga author (8 Man, Genma Taisen, Wolf Guy).
- Fritz C. Holte, 89, Norwegian economist.
- Justin Kili, 61, Papua New Guinean journalist and media personality.
- Rebecca D. Lockhart, 46, American politician, Speaker of the Utah House of Representatives (since 2011), Creutzfeldt–Jakob disease.
- Henry Manne, 86, American law and economics academic.
- Roderick McDonald, 69, American basketball player (Utah Stars).
- Terence Miller, 96, British palaeontologist.
- Origa, 44, Russian singer (Ghost in the Shell: Stand Alone Complex), lung cancer.
- Peter Partner, 90, British historian.
- David E. Paulson, 83, American politician, member of the Wisconsin State Assembly for the 28th District (1978–1986).
- Frank Pesci, 86, American politician.
- Greg Plitt, 37, American fitness trainer (Work Out) and actor (Grudge Match, Terminator Salvation, Bobby), hit by train.
- Theodore Sourkes, 95, Canadian biochemist and neuropsychopharmacologist.
- Bill Sykes, 75, English author and chaplain.

=== 18 ===
- Mohammad Ali Allahdadi, 52, Iranian army general, airstrike.
- Vinay V. Deodhar, 66, Indian mathematician.
- Maurice Dumas, 87, Canadian politician, MP for Argenteuil—Papineau—Mirabel (1993–2000).
- Cynthia Layne, 51, American jazz singer, cancer.
- Grazia Livi, 84, Italian author and journalist, Viareggio Prize winner.
- D. C. McNeil, 87, Canadian politician.
- Alberto Nisman, 51, Argentine prosecutor (AMIA bombing), apparent suicide by gunshot.
- Paul O'Grady, 54, Australian politician, member of the New South Wales Legislative Council (1988–1996), cancer.
- Muna Obiekwe, 36, Nigerian actor, kidney disease.
- Dorothy Barnes Pelote, 85, American politician, member of the Georgia House of Representatives (1993–2003).
- Pietro Pianta, 74, Italian footballer.
- June Randall, 87, British script supervisor (The Spy Who Loved Me, A Clockwork Orange, The Shining).
- Piet van der Sanden, 90, Dutch politician, member of the House of Representatives (1971–1972, 1973–1989), member of the European Parliament (1973–1974).
- Milt Schoon, 92, American basketball player (Sheboygan Red Skins).
- Harish Chandra Srivastava, 90, Indian politician.
- Yasuaki Taiho, 51, Taiwanese-born Japanese baseball player (Chunichi Dragons, Hanshin Tigers), acute myeloid leukemia.
- Dallas Taylor, 66, American drummer (Crosby, Stills, Nash & Young), complications of viral pneumonia and kidney disease.
- Christine Valmy, 88, Romanian-born American cosmetologist.
- Tony Verna, 81, American television producer, invented instant replay, leukemia.
- Kjell Arnljot Wig, 90, Norwegian media personality.

=== 19 ===
- Canserbero, 26, Venezuelan rapper, stabbing
- John Bilezikjian, 66, Armenian oud musician, kidney disease.
- Rose Marie Brown, 95, American beauty pageant contestant, Miss Virginia (1939).
- Justin Capră, 81, Romanian inventor.
- Mickey Demos, 83, Greek urologist, lawyer, and boxer.
- Gordon Dickson, 83, Canadian Olympic marathon runner (1960).
- Charles W. Edwards, 80, American politician.
- Adam Yahiye Gadahn, 36, American al-Qaeda operative, drone strike.
- Vera Gornostayeva, 85, Russian pianist and piano teacher.
- Michel Guimond, 61, Canadian politician, MP for Montmorency—Charlevoix—Haute-Côte-Nord (1993–2011), heart failure.
- José María Hernández González, 88, Mexican Roman Catholic prelate, Bishop of Chilapa (1983–1989) and Netzahualcóyotl (1989–2003).
- Oscar Hayes, 47, American gospel musician.
- Arthit Kamlang-ek, 89, Thai general, Supreme Commander of the Royal Thai Armed Forces (1983–1986).
- Vladimir Kesarev, 84, Russian footballer (Dynamo Moscow).
- Ed Kinley, 83, Canadian politician, Nova Scotia MLA (1997–1998).
- Anne Kirkbride, 60, British actress (Coronation Street), breast cancer.
- Rajni Kothari, 85, Indian political scientist.
- Robert Manzon, 97, French Formula One driver, last surviving racer from first World Championship.
- Mark Marquess, 89, Canadian ice hockey player (Boston Bruins).
- Reinaldo Oliver, 82, Puerto Rican javelin thrower and Olympic athlete (1952, 1956).
- Karl H. Pribram, 95, Austrian-born American neuroscientist and educator, cancer.
- Bob Sadino, 81, Indonesian businessman.
- Ward Swingle, 87, American musician (The Swingle Singers, Les Double Six).
- Bob Symes, 90, British inventor and television presenter.
- Reies Tijerina, 88, American Chicano activist.
- Peter Wallenberg Sr., 88, Swedish financier and industrialist, patriarch of the Wallenberg family.

=== 20 ===
- Barbara Craddock, 74, American dancer and choreographer.
- James L. Fowler, 84, American military veteran, founded the Marine Corps Marathon.
- Edgar Froese, 70, German musician (Tangerine Dream), pulmonary embolism.
- Melvin Gordon, 95, American business executive, CEO of Tootsie Roll Industries (since 1962).
- Lawrence Hogben, 98, New Zealand meteorologist and naval officer.
- Anatol Hrytskievich, 85, Belarusian historian.
- Graeme Hugo, 68, Australian demographer and geographer, cancer.
- Gustav Kaufmann, 96, Liechtenstein Olympic sport shooter.
- Herman E. Lauhoff, 81, American politician, member of the Texas House of Representatives (1974–1981).
- Rose Marie McCoy, 92, American songwriter ("It Hurts Me to My Heart", "Don't Be Angry", "Tryin' to Get to You", "It's Gonna Work Out Fine").
- Gloria D. Miklowitz, 87, American author.
- Oliver Neighbour, 91, British musicologist and librarian.
- Wilfride Piollet, 71, French ballerina and choreographer, cancer.
- Peter Pontiac, 63, Dutch cartoonist, winner of the Stripschapprijs (1997), liver disease.
- Bette Rogge, 92, American radio and television presenter.
- William Roffler, 84, American football player (Philadelphia Eagles), pneumonia.
- Hitoshi Saito, 54, Japanese judoka, Olympic champion (1984, 1988), bile duct cancer.
- Ricardo dos Santos, 24, Brazilian surfer, shot.
- Jerome Van Sistine, 89, American politician, member of the Wisconsin State Senate (1977–1993).
- James Walker, 41, Australian television writer (Neighbours), diabetes.
- F. Eugene Yates, 87, American physiologist.

=== 21 ===
- Abudureheman Abulikemu, 36, Chinese boxer.
- George Atkins, 82, American football player (Detroit Lions).
- Patricia Berjak, 75, South African botanist.
- Marcus Borg, 72, American Biblical scholar and theologian (Jesus Seminar), idiopathic pulmonary fibrosis.
- Leon Brittan, 75, British politician, Home Secretary (1983–1985), Vice-President of the European Commission (1999), cancer.
- Vince Camuto, 78, American footwear designer (Nine West), prostate cancer.
- Emmanuel Carter, 85, Trinidadian politician, President of the Senate (1990–1995), acting President (1990) during the Jamaat al Muslimeen coup attempt.
- Frieda Dänzer, 84, Swiss Alpine skier, Olympic silver medalist (1956).
- George W. Downs, 68, American political scientist, heart failure.
- George Goodwin, 97, American journalist, Pulitzer Prize winner (1948).
- Harry Gordon, 89, Australian Olympic historian, journalist and newspaper editor.
- Martin Honeysett, 71, British cartoonist.
- Frank Hooley, 91, British politician, MP for Sheffield Heeley (1966–1970, 1974–1983).
- Waldemar Kmentt, 85, Austrian operatic tenor.
- Roy Noble Lee, 99, American judge, Chief Justice of the Supreme Court of Mississippi (1987–1993).
- Johnnie Lewis, 68, Liberian lawyer and politician, Chief Justice (2006–2012).
- Beryl Marshall, 85, Argentine Olympic swimmer.
- Kemal Monteno, 66, Bosnian singer-songwriter, pneumonia and sepsis.
- Keith Rayner, 71, American cognitive psychologist.
- Marshall Schlom, 86, American script supervisor (Psycho, Perry Mason, Rain Man), complications from a fall.
- Chin Shunshin, 90, Japanese author.
- Pauline Yates, 85, English actress (The Fall and Rise of Reginald Perrin).

=== 22 ===
- Don Bryant, 73, American baseball player (Houston Astros).
- Peggy Charren, 86, American children's television activist.
- Stephen A. Czerkas, 63, American paleontologist and sculptor.
- Thomas Figures, 70, American attorney and judge.
- Wendell Ford, 90, American politician, Governor of Kentucky (1971–1974), member of the U.S. Senate (1974–1999), lung cancer.
- Margaret Bloy Graham, 94, Canadian children's book illustrator (Harry the Dirty Dog).
- Joan Hinde, 81, English trumpeter and entertainer.
- René Jodoin, 94, Canadian animation director and producer.
- Yoshiyuki Kuroda, 86, Japanese film director (Yokai Monsters: Spook Warfare, Lone Wolf and Cub: White Heaven in Hell, The Invisible Swordsman).
- Tommy Mason, 75, American football player (Minnesota Vikings, Los Angeles Rams).
- Fabrizio de Miranda, 88, Italian structural engineer and university professor.
- Franco Nicolazzi, 90, Italian politician, MP (1963–1990), Secretary of the Italian Democratic Socialist Party (1985–1988).
- Kel O'Shea, 81, Australian rugby league player (Western Suburbs).
- Wayne Quinton, 94, American biomedical engineer.
- Dacia Valent, 51, Somali-born Italian politician, MEP (1989–1994), myocardial infarction.
- Victor Yarnell, 95, Canadian-born American politician.
- Lawrence Paul Zatkoff, 75, American federal judge, cancer.

=== 23 ===
- Abdullah of Saudi Arabia, 90, Saudi royal, King (since 2005), complications from pneumonia.
- Ernie Banks, 83, American Hall of Fame baseball player (Chicago Cubs), heart attack.
- Jalynn Bennett, 71, Canadian consultant and corporate director.
- Betty Jane Diener, 74, American politician, Virginia Secretary of Commerce (1982–1986), pulmonary fibrosis.
- Marc Dufour, 73, Canadian ice hockey player (New York Rangers, Los Angeles Kings).
- Prosper Ego, 87, Dutch activist, founder of the Oud-Strijders Legioen.
- Nol Heijerman, 74, Dutch footballer (Sparta).
- Simma Holt, 92, Canadian journalist and politician, MP for Vancouver Kingsway (1974–1979).
- Barrie Ingham, 82, English actor (The Great Mouse Detective, Doctor Who, A Challenge for Robin Hood).
- Nick Koback, 79, American baseball player (Pittsburgh Pirates).
- Svein Døvle Larssen, 86, Norwegian newspaper editor.
- Alexander Lastin, 38, Russian chess grandmaster.
- Pedro Lemebel, 62, Chilean writer, laryngeal cancer.
- Les McMahon, 84, Australian politician, member of the Australian House of Representatives for Sydney (1975–1983).
- Bud Miller, 91, Canadian politician, member of the Legislative Assembly of Alberta (1971–1986).
- M. S. Narayana, 63, Indian Telugu actor, multiple organ failure.
- Leon Pense, 92, American football player (Pittsburgh Steelers).
- George E. Schafer, 92, American lieutenant general.
- Jackie Selebi, 64, South African police officer, Commissioner (2000–2009), kidney disease.
- Frank Sims, 93, American baseball broadcaster.

=== 24 ===
- Stig Bergling, 77, Swedish secret service officer convicted of treason, Parkinson's disease and lung ailment.
- Robert Bonnaventure, 94, French cyclist.
- Peter Bridges, 89, British Anglican priest, Archdeacon of Southend (1972–1977), Coventry (1977–1983) and Warwick (1983–1990).
- Jerry Bryant, 69, American historian.
- Link Byfield, 63, Canadian conservative columnist, politician and publisher, oesophageal and liver cancer.
- Julio Canessa, 89, Chilean politician and general, member of the Government Junta (1983–1985), Senator (1998–2006).
- Otto Carius, 92, German World War II tank commander.
- Maria Cerra, 96, American Olympic fencer (1948).
- Aisha Chaudhary, 18, Indian motivational speaker and author, pulmonary fibrosis.
- Howard Clarke, 85, American classicist.
- Toller Cranston, 65, Canadian figure skater, Olympic bronze medallist (1976), heart attack.
- Maria Della Costa, 89, Brazilian actress (Brasileiras e Brasileiros), pulmonary edema.
- Floyd Dunn, 90, American electrical engineer.
- Johan Ferner, 87, Norwegian sailor, Olympic silver medalist (1952).
- Eric Fitzgibbon, 78, Australian politician, member of the House of Representatives for Hunter (1984–1996).
- Joe Franklin, 88, American television and radio talk show host, prostate cancer.
- Wilfrido Garay, 71, Paraguayan footballer.
- Sir David Graaff, 3rd Baronet, 74, South African businessman and winemaker.
- Muhammad Ibrahim Habsade, 62, Somali politician and rebel soldier, diabetes.
- Frances Lennon, 102, British artist.
- Erkki Lyijynen, 89, Finnish Olympic rower.
- Ken McDonald, 86, Australian-British Olympic weightlifter.
- V. S. Raghavan, 90, Indian Tamil actor.
- Alfred H. Savage, 84, Canadian civil servant, manager of the Toronto Transit Commission (1981–1987).
- Joan Serra, 87, Spanish Olympic water polo player (1948, 1952).
- Fred Shank, 74, American nutritionist.
- Daniel R. Simpson, 87, American politician, member of the North Carolina House of Representatives and Senate, Lewy body dementia.
- Peter Westervelt, 95, American physicist.
- Toyoko Yoshino, 94, Japanese Olympic athlete.
- Tengku Ampuan Tua Intan Zaharah, 86, Malaysian royal, Raja Permaisuri Agong (1965–1970).

=== 25 ===
- Zulkifli Abdhir, 48, Malaysian terrorist and bomb maker, shot.
- Sir Robert Atkinson, 98, British businessman and naval officer.
- Sonny Berger, 92, American baseball player.
- Rose Cabat, 100, American studio ceramicist.
- Mari Ellis, 101, British writer and women's rights activist.
- Theodore A. Farwell, 84, American Olympic skier.
- Pauline Fisk, 66, British author, cancer.
- Demetrio González, 87, Spanish-born Mexican actor (Dos Corazones y un Cielo) and singer, complications from a stroke.
- Pierre Gosnat, 66, French politician, cancer.
- Godfrey Kalimugogo, 71, Ugandan writer.
- John Leggett, 97, American writer, director of the Iowa Writers' Workshop, pneumonia.
- Giancarlo Ligabue, 83, Italian palaeontologist (discoverer of Ligabueino), Forza Europa politician and businessman.
- Sarojini Mahishi, 88, Indian translator and politician.
- Richard McBrien, 78, American Roman Catholic priest and theologian.
- Bill Monbouquette, 78, American baseball player (Boston Red Sox).
- Don O'Hearn, 86, Canadian ice hockey player.
- John Pick, 93, English poet and novelist.
- Demis Roussos, 68, Egyptian-born Greek singer ("Forever and Ever").
- Ian Towers, 74, English footballer (Burnley, Oldham Athletic).
- Ernst Träger, 88, German judge.
- Richard M. Watt, 81–82, American historian and writer.

=== 26 ===
- R. J. Adams, 72, American actor (Rocky IV), heart attack.
- José Luis Allende, 88, Spanish Olympic sailor.
- Henk Bloemers, 69, Dutch footballer (FC Eindhoven).
- Miguel Ángel Cascallana, 66, Spanish Olympic handball player (1972).
- Edwin A. Colvin, 87, American politician, member of the Vermont House of Representatives (1975–1982).
- Cleven Goudeau, 83, American greeting card artist.
- Howard Hawkins, 82, American bicycle tool manufacturer (Park Tool).
- Stephen R. Johnson, 63, American television and music video director ("Sledgehammer"), cardiac complications.
- R. K. Laxman, 93, Indian cartoonist, illustrator and humourist, multiple organ failure.
- Neil LeVang, 83, American musician (The Lawrence Welk Show).
- Lucjan Lis, 64, Polish cyclist, Olympic silver medalist (1972).
- Lester McCumbers, 93, American fiddler.
- Valery Miloserdov, 63, Russian Olympic dual bronze medallist basketball player (1976, 1980).
- Sidewalk Sam, 75, American artist.
- Lee Spick, 34, English snooker player, liver-related illness.
- Charles Thomas, 82, American sprinter and athletics coach.
- Tom Uren, 93, Australian politician, member of the House of Representatives for Reid (1958–1990).
- Rositsa Yanakieva, 60, Bulgarian politician and chemist, Vice-chairwoman of the National Assembly (since 2014), brain hemorrhage.

=== 27 ===
- Wilfred Agbonavbare, 48, Nigerian footballer (Rayo Vallecano, national team), cancer.
- Rafael Corrales Ayala, 89, Mexican politician, MP for Guanajuato (1949–1952, 1979–1982), Governor of Guanajuato (1985–1991).
- Rocky Bridges, 87, American baseball player (Cincinnati Reds, Washington Senators).
- Harriet Elizabeth Byrd, 88, American politician, member of the Wyoming House of Representatives (1981–1988) and Senate (1988–1992).
- Arturo Carmassi, 89, Italian sculptor and painter.
- Yves Chauvin, 84, Belgian-born French Nobel Prize-winning chemist (2005).
- Roger Cowley, 75, English physicist.
- Suzette Haden Elgin, 78, American science fiction author and linguist.
- Henk Faanhof, 92, Dutch Olympic (1948) and professional road bicycle racer.
- Roy Francis, 92, British naval officer and railway engineer.
- Ebbe Grims-land, 99, Swedish composer and viola player.
- Jordan Gruzen, 80, American architect, bladder cancer.
- Pierre Hernandez, 86, French boxer.
- Warren Hill, 54, American convicted murderer, execution by lethal injection.
- Vladimir-Georg Karassev-Orgusaar, 83, Estonian film director.
- David Landau, 67, British-born Israeli journalist and newspaper editor (Haaretz).
- John T. Myers, 87, American politician, member of the United States House of Representatives from Indiana (1967–1997).
- Ronnie O'Reilly, 63, Irish cricket umpire.
- José Pereira, 84, Indian Sanskrit scholar, historian and artist.
- Joe Rígoli, 78, Argentine actor and comedian (Un, dos, tres... responda otra vez), heart failure.
- Joseph Rotman, 80, Canadian businessman and philanthropist, chancellor of The University of Western Ontario.
- Al Severinsen, 70, American baseball player (Baltimore Orioles, San Diego Padres).
- Bob Shea, 90, American basketball player (Providence Steamrollers).
- Charles H. Townes, 99, American physicist, Nobel Prize laureate in Physics (1964).
- Gunnar Christie Wasberg, 91, Norwegian non-fiction writer.
- Charlie Williams, 67, American baseball player (New York Mets, San Francisco Giants), complications from heart surgery.
- Larry Winters, 58, American professional wrestler and trainer, heart attack.

=== 28 ===
- Suraj Abdurrahman, 60, Nigerian army officer.
- Egon Adler, 77, German Olympic silver medallist cyclist (1960).
- Arthur Alarcón, 89, American federal judge.
- Mala Aravindan, 76, Indian Malayalam actor.
- Francis Bennion, 92, British lawyer.
- Alberto Cardaccio, 65, Uruguayan footballer (Danubio, national team), traffic collision.
- Lionel Gilbert, 90, Australian historian, author, curator, lecturer, and biographer.
- Georg Guggemos, 88, German Olympic ice hockey player (1952).
- Don Jones, 91, American artist and art therapist.
- Tommie Manderson, 102, British make-up artist (Willow, Alien, The Killing Fields).
- Beric Morley, 71, British architectural historian.
- Neyko Nenov, 53, Bulgarian major general, Deputy Chief of Defence (since 2014), brain tumor.
- Jaswant Singh Rajput, 88, Indian field hockey player, Olympic champion (1948, 1952).
- Steve Sanfield, 77, American poet and author.
- Edward Saylor, 94, American World War II veteran, member of Doolittle's Raiders.
- Katharine Worth, 92, British drama academic.

=== 29 ===
- Fernando Alloni, 89, Italian Olympic speed skater.
- Maurizio Arcieri, 72, Italian singer (The New Dada, Krisma).
- Amparo Baró, 77, Spanish actress (7 Vidas, Siete mesas de billar francés), cancer.
- Subhash Ghisingh, 78, Indian politician (Gorkha National Liberation Front), cirrhosis and liver cancer.
- Walter Glechner, 75, Austrian footballer (Rapid Wien, national team).
- Bernice Gordon, 101, American crossword writer (The New York Times), heart failure.
- Terry Hollindrake, 80, English rugby league player.
- Kōno Taeko, 88, Japanese writer and critic, respiratory failure.
- Cedric Kushner, 66, South African-born American boxing promoter, heart attack.
- Noel Lister, 87, British businessman (MFI).
- Howard Madole, 91, American architect.
- Riichirō Manabe, 90, Japanese composer.
- José Martins da Silva, 78, Brazilian Roman Catholic prelate, Archbishop of Porto Velho (1982–1997).
- Will McBride, 84, American photographer.
- Danny McCulloch, 69, English bassist (The Animals), heart failure.
- Colleen McCullough, 77, Australian author (The Thorn Birds), renal failure.
- Rod McKuen, 81, American poet, singer and songwriter ("Jean", "Seasons in the Sun"), respiratory arrest.
- Kel Nagle, 94, Australian golfer, British Open champion (1960).
- Paul Panhuysen, 80, Dutch composer.
- Derek S. Pugh, 84, British psychologist and business theorist.
- Dora Prince, 84, Argentine actress.
- Derek Robertson, 65, Scottish footballer (St. Johnstone), cancer.
- Doris Schoettler-Boll, 70, German artist.
- Tobin Siebers, 62, American scholar.
- Tenkoko Sonoda, 96, Japanese politician, member of the Diet (1946–1952).
- Ole Sørensen, 77, Danish footballer.
- Carla Tichatschek, 74, Italian Olympic figure skater.
- Peter Towe, 92, Canadian diplomat, Ambassador to the United States (1977–1981).
- Alexander Vraciu, 96, American World War II Navy fighter ace, Navy Cross recipient.
- Len Wyatt, 95, New Zealand cricketer.
- Israel Yinon, 59, Israeli conductor.

=== 30 ===
- Richard Clark Barkley, 82, American diplomat, Ambassador to East Germany (1988–1990).
- Carl Boldt, 82, American basketball player (San Francisco Dons).
- Ricardo Bressani, 88, Guatemalan food scientist, heart attack.
- Mathilda B. Canter, 90, American psychologist.
- Carl Djerassi, 91, Austrian-American chemist, novelist and playwright, liver and bone cancer.
- Rose Frisch, 96, American biologist.
- Johnny Goodman, 87, British TV producer.
- Kenji Goto, 47, Japanese journalist and ISIS hostage, beheading.
- Harold Hassall, 85, English footballer (Bolton Wanderers).
- John Hopkins, 78, British photographer, activist, and promoter (Notting Hill Carnival, International Times).
- Stuart Inder, 88, Australian journalist and publisher, specialist in Pacific Islands affairs.
- Ülo Kaevats, 67, Estonian philosopher and politician, Secretary of State (1992–1995).
- Jack Kay, 63, American academic and college administrator.
- Geraldine McEwan, 82, British actress (Robin Hood: Prince of Thieves, Agatha Christie's Marple), stroke.
- John McHugh, 84, American politician, Mayor of Toledo, Ohio (1990–1993), cancer.
- Cavendish Morton, 103, British painter.
- Howard Norris, 80, British rugby union player (Wales national team, British Lions).
- Richard Richards, 82, American politician, Chairman of the Republican National Committee (1981–1983).
- Ben Schadler, 90, American basketball player.
- Ezra Sims, 87, American composer.
- Jerry L. Smith, 71, American politician, member of the Oklahoma House of Representatives (1972–1980) and Senate (1980–2004).
- José Van Baelen, 87, Belgian Olympic fencer.
- Gerrit Voorting, 92, Dutch professional road bicycle racer, Olympic silver medalist (1948).
- Joe Williams, 73, American football player (Winnipeg Blue Bombers, Ottawa Rough Riders, Toronto Argonauts).
- Than Wyenn, 95, American actor (Imitation of Life, Splash, Being There).
- Zhelyu Zhelev, 79, Bulgarian politician, President (1990–1997).

=== 31 ===
- Dexter Adams, 89, English footballer.
- Harith bin Ghazi al-Nadhari, Yemeni militant, drone strike.
- Vasco Bendini, 93, Italian informalist painter.
- Robert Blees, 96, American film and television screenwriter and producer (Cattle Queen of Montana).
- José Manuel Lara Bosch, 68, Spanish media executive, CEO of Grupo Planeta (since 2003) and Atresmedia (since 2012), pancreatic cancer.
- Tomás Bulat, 50, Argentine economist and journalist, traffic collision.
- Earl Christensen, 95, American politician, member of the Wyoming Senate (1959–1984).
- Don Covay, 78, American R&B singer and songwriter ("Chain of Fools").
- Vic Howe, 85, Canadian ice hockey player (New York Rangers).
- William Klinger, 42, Croatian historian, shot.
- Udo Lattek, 80, German football coach (Bayern Munich, Borussia Mönchengladbach).
- Freddie Meyers, 82, Canadian football player (Edmonton Eskimos).
- Gabrielle Poulin, 86, Canadian writer.
- Adalberto Arturo Rosat, 81, Italian-born Bolivian Roman Catholic prelate, Bishop of the Territorial Prelature of Aiquile (1986–2009).
- Michael Saward, 82, British Anglican priest and hymnist.
- Lizabeth Scott, 93, American actress (Dead Reckoning), congestive heart failure.
- Sanford Socolow, 86, American journalist (CBS News).
- Richard von Weizsäcker, 94, German politician, President of West Germany (1984–1990) and Germany (1990–1994).
