= General McKee =

General McKee may refer to:

- George H. McKee (1923–2015), U.S. Air Force lieutenant general
- Seth J. McKee (1916–2016), U.S. Air Force four-star general
- William J. McKee (soldier) (1853–1925), U.S. Army brigadier general
- William F. McKee (1906–1987), U.S. Air Force four-star general
