= Madole =

Madole is a surname. Notable people with the surname include:

- Howard Madole (1923–2015), American architect
- James H. Madole (1927–1979), American fascist
