= Richard Watt =

Richard Watt may refer to:

- Richard Harding Watt, English designer
- Richard M. Watt, American historian and writer

== See also ==
- Richard Watts (disambiguation)
