= George McKee =

George McKee may refer to:

- George McKee (Medal of Honor) (died 1892), American Civil War Medal of Honor recipient
- George C. McKee (1837–1890), U.S. Representative from Mississippi
- George H. McKee (1923–2015), American Air Force lieutenant general

== See also ==
- George Mackey (1916–2006), American mathematician
