= Rantala =

Rantala is a Finnish surname.

== Geographical distribution ==
As of 2014, 85.7% of all known bearers of the surname Rantala were residents of Finland, 5.1% of the United States, 3.4% in Sweden, 1.1% of Canada and 1.1% of Estonia.

In Finland, the frequency of the surname was higher than national average (1:628) in the following regions:

1. South Ostrobothnia (1:262)
2. Satakunta (1:310)
3. Pirkanmaa (1:378)
4. Kymenlaakso (1:452)
5. Southwest Finland (1:488)
6. Central Ostrobothnia (1:507)
7. Päijänne Tavastia (1:537)
8. Tavastia Proper (1:543)

== People ==
- Eero Rantala (1941–2019), Finnish politician
- Harri J. Rantala (born 1980), Finnish film director
- Iiro Rantala (born 1970), Finnish jazz pianist
- Leif Rantala (1947–2015), Finnish linguist
- Lene Rantala (born 1968), Danish team handball player
- Riku Rantala (born 1974), Finnish journalist, best known from travelling series Madventures

== See also ==
- Rantala incident, 7-year-old child with Russian-Finnish dual citizenship taken by the Finnish social service to a children's shelter in 2010
