= Pello (name) =

Pello is a given name, nickname and surname. It may refer to:

- Pello Bilbao (born 1990), Spanish racing cyclist
- Pedro Pello Iguaran (1940–2015), Spanish footballer
- Pello Otxandiano (born 1983), Basque engineer, professor and politician
- Pello or Peio Ruiz Cabestany (born 1962), Spanish former racing cyclist
- Pello Urizar (born 1968), Basque politician
- Liis Pello (born 1988), Estonian footballer

== See also ==
- Carlos Fernández-Pello, Spanish mechanical engineer, professor and assistant dean
