= O'Hearn =

- Language: English

Origin
- Region of origin: England, Ireland

Other names
- Variant form: Hearn (disambiguation)

O'Hearn or O'Hearne is an English/Irish surname. As an English surname, it can derive firstly from an early medieval nickname for someone thought to resemble the Heron bird. Notable people with the surname include:

- Andrew O'Hearne, American politician
- Christine O'Hearn (born 1969), American judge
- Denis O'Hearn, American sociologist
- Don O'Hearn (1928–2015), Canadian ice hockey player
- Ed O'Hearn (1898–1972), American football player
- Eileen O'Hearn (1913–1992), American actress
- George E. O'Hearn (1880–1967), American football coach
- John O'Hearn (1893–1977), American football player
- Kate O'Hearn, Canadian writer
- Kevin O'Hearn (born c. 1963), American politician
- Melinda O'Hearn (alias Midajah; born 1970), American actress, singer and fitness model
- Michael O’Hearn (born 1957) American Opera Singer
- Mike O'Hearn (born 1969), American bodybuilder
- Patrick O'Hearn (born 1954), American musician and composer
- Peter O'Hearn (born 1963), British-Canadian computer scientist
- Robert O'Hearn (1921–2016), American set designer
- Ryan O'Hearn (born 1993), American baseball player
- Sean O'Hearn (born 1998), American soccer player
- Walter O'Hearn (Australian politician) (1890–1950), Australian politician
- Walter D. O'Hearn (1910–1969), Canadian journalist
- Walter J. A. O'Hearn (1879–1933), Canadian politician from Nova Scotia
- Zooko Wilcox-O'Hearn (born 1974), American computer security specialist

== See also ==
- Michael A'Hearn (1940–2017), American astronomer
