= Bloemers =

Bloemers is a surname. Notable people with the surname include:

- Arnoldus Bloemers (1792–1844), Dutch painter
- Henk Bloemers (1945–2015), Dutch footballer
