= Richard Watts (disambiguation) =

Richard Watts (1529–1579) was an English businessman and MP for Rochester.

Richard Watts may also refer to:

- Richard Watts (politician) (born 1975), British Labour Party politician
- Richard Watts Jr. (1898–1981), theatre critic
- Richard C. Watts (1853–1930), American judge

== See also ==
- Richard Watt (disambiguation)
