= Arnaldo Calveyra =

Argentine poet, novelist and playwright

- Born: 1929; Mansilla, Entre Ríos, Argentina
- Died: January 15, 2015 (aged 85–86); Paris, France
- Education: National University of La Plata, Argentina
- Occupations: Poet, Playwright, Novelist
- Spouse: Monique Tur
- Children: Beltran, Eva
- Writing career
- Language: Spanish; French

Arnaldo Calveyra (1929 – 15 January 2015) was an Argentine poet, novelist and playwright, living in Paris since 1960. In 1999, Calveyra was made a Commander of the French Order of Arts and Letters for his contributions to the arts.

== Life ==
Calveyra was born in Mansilla, Argentina in 1929 and remained in the Entre Ríos Province for his early life. He began attending high school in 1943 in Concepción del Uruguay In 1950, he left the province and moved to La Plata where he pursued a degree at the Faculty of Humanities at the National University of La Plata. A research fellowship brought Calveyra to Paris in December 1960. There he met and came to work closely with Julio Cortázar, Alejandra Pizarnik, Claude Roy, Gaëtan Picon, Cristina Campo and Laure Bataillon. In 1968, Calveyra married Monique Tur; they have two children, Beltran and Eva. Calveyra and Tur live in Paris. He died of a heart attack in 2015 in Paris.

== Career ==
Calveyra's first book of poetry, Cartas Para Que La Alegria, was much heralded by Carlos Mastronardi; in Victoria Ocampo's Sur magazine No. 261 (1959) Carlos Mastronardi wrote, "The pages of Cartas exhume remote happenings and hazy states of the spirit, a language of a sustained and unvarying tone that allows us to access volatile capacities. It's easy to feel how Calveyra negotiates expressive dilated forms, with incidental clauses that frequently capsize poetic essence. Attentive to the pure and docile nature he gives to the voices that come from its urgent intimacy, Calveyra dispenses with the heavy appoggiaturas and connectors that are themselves the strictness of logical language."

Like many Argentine artists and intellectuals, Calveyra emigrated to Paris in the 1960s buoyed by the dynamic cultural landscape there at the time. By the 1970s, the Guerra Sucia obstructed any possibility of a return to Argentina. Calveyra remained in Paris, where he worked with the English film and theater director Peter Brook and published his own works with the French publishing house Actes-Sud. In 1988, poet Juan Gelman recommended Calveyra to the Argentine publisher Jose Luis Mangieri (Libros de Tierra Firme), effectively reintroducing him to an Argentine audience.

Argentine literary critic Pablo Gianera recently wrote, "It isn't inexact to say that Arnaldo Calveyra never abandoned the Entre Rios (Mansilla) landscape, this primary terrain that gave forth to the almost adamic relationship he sustains with language. Everything he names, seems named for the first time ... Calveyra's language of discovery is a mechanic of surprisingly reversible time; with each word, he recovers with intimacy and pain that which no longer exists. It is the movement of memory that closes like a circle around origins and seizes forever those things that are as fleeting as light itself.".

== Awards ==
- Chevalier dans l'Ordre des Arts et des Lettres (France, Ministry of Culture, 1986)
- Officier des Arts et des Lettres (France, Ministry of Culture, 1992)
- Commandeur de l'Ordre des Arts et des Lettres (France, Ministry of Culture, 1999)
- Guggenheim Poetry Fellow (John Simon Guggenheim Memorial Foundation, NY NY 2000)

== Selected bibliography ==
Cartas para que la alegría (poetry), Cooperativa Impresora y Distribuidora, Buenos Aires, 1959.

El diputado está triste (play), Editorial Leonardo, Buenos Aires, 1959.

Moctezuma (play) Collection Théâtre du Monde Entier, Editorial Gallimard, 1969 (French version, translation by Laure Bataillon).

Latin American Trip (play), Cahiers Renaud-Barrault n° 75, Editorial Gallimard, 1971 (French version).

Latin American Trip (play), Monte Avila Editores, Caracas, Venezuela, 1978 (Spanish version).

Lettres pour que la joie (poetry), Editorial Actes Sud, 1983 (French translation by Laure Bataillon).

Iguana, iguana (poetry), Editorial Actes Sud, 1985 (French translation by Laure Bataillon).

Journal du dératiseur (poetry), Editorial Actes Sud, 1987 (French translation by Claire Durouvray).

Cartas para que la alegría; e Iguana, iguana (poetry), Editorial Libros de Tierra Firme, Buenos Aires, 1988.

L'éclipse de la balle (play) Editorial Papiers-Actes Sud, 1988 (French translation by Florence Delay).

Los bares / Les bars (poetry, with a recording by Antonio Segui) Editorial Les Yeux ouverts, Ginebra, 1988.

Le lit d'Aurélia (fiction), Editorial Actes Sud, 1989 (French translation by Laure Bataillon and Alain Keruzoré).

La cama de Aurelia (fiction), Editorial Plaza y Janés, Barcelona, 1990.

L'origine de la lumière (fiction), Editorial Actes Sud, 1992 (French translation by Françoise Campo).

Palinure (poetry) Editorial Tarabuste, 1992 (translation by Laure Bataillon).

Anthologie personnelle (selection of poetry), Editorial Actes Sud, edited by Florence Delay, 1994.

Second edition of Lettres pour que la joie (poetry), Editorial Actes Sud, 1997.

El hombre del Luxemburgo (poetry) Editorial Tusquets, Barcelona, 1997.

Si l'Argentine est un roman (essay), Editorial Actes Sud, 1998 (French translation by Claude Bleton).

L'homme du Luxembourg (poetry), Editorial Actes Sud, 1998 (translation by Florence Delay).

La cama de Aurelia (fiction), Tusquets Editores, Buenos Aires, 1999.

Morse y otros textos (poetry), Ediciones Mate, Buenos Aires, 1999.

Le livre du miroir (poetry), Ed. Actes Sud, 2000 (French translation by Silvia Baron Supervielle).

"Apuntes para una reencarnación", (poetry) Diario de poesía, No. 53, Buenos Aires, October 2002.

Si la Argentina fuera una novela (essay), Editorial Simurg, Buenos Aires, 2000.

Libro de las mariposas (poetry), Alción Editora, Córdoba, Argentina, 2001.

"Bibliothèques idéales" (selected works for the 10th edition of Lettres sur Cour), Editions Le Temps qu'il fait Vienne, France, July 2002.

Paris par écrit, Vingt écrivains parlent de leur arrondissement, (selected works, collection) Éditions de l'Inventaire et la Maison des écrivains, Paris, 2002.

Diario del fumigador de guardia (poetry) Editorial VOX, Bahía Blanca, 2002.

Maïs en grégorien (poetry), Ed. Actes Sud, 2003 (French translation by Anne Picard).

Second edition of L'origine de la lumière (fiction), Ed. Actes Sud, 2003.

El origen de la luz (fiction), Editorial Sudamericana, Buenos Aires, 2004.

Livre des papillons/Libro de las mariposas (poetry), Editorial Le temps qu'il fait, Cognac, France, bilingual edition, 2004 (translation by Anne Picard).

Maizal del gregoriano (poetry), Editorial Adriana Hidalgo, Buenos Aires, 2005.

Tres hombres (poetry), Editorial Eloísa Cartonera, Buenos Aires, 2005.

Diario de Eleusis (poetry), Editorial Adriana Hidalgo, Buenos Aires, 2006.

Journal d'Eleusis (poetry), ediciones Actes Sud, 2008 (translation by Claude Bleton).

Poesía reunida (complete collection of poetry), Editorial Adriana Hidalgo, Buenos Aires, 2008.

El cuaderno griego (poetry), Editorial Adriana Hidalgo, Buenos Aires, 2009.

Florida (essay), in Le goût de Buenos Aires, Jeanine Baude, Le Mercure de France, Paris, 2009.

Le cahier grec (poetry), Actes Sud, 2010 (translation by Claude Bleton).

El caballo blanco de Mozart (essays), Editorial La Bestia Equilátera, Buenos Aires, 2010.

"Una flor para Selma" (fiction), in La ciudad como un plano, edited by Matías Serra Bradford, Editorial La Bestia Equilátera, Buenos Aires, 2010.

La lluvia de sobretecho... (poem from Cartas para que la alegría, illustrated children's book), Editorial Mágicas Naranjas, Buenos Aires, 2011.
