= Nelson Townsend =

American college athletics administrator

Biographical details
- Born: May 16, 1941; Horntown, Virginia, U.S.
- Died: January 8, 2015 (aged 73); Tallahassee, Florida, U.S.
- Education: Maryland State College currently Maryland Eastern Shore Class of 1962

Administrative career (AD unless noted)
- 1976–1979: Maryland Eastern Shore
- 1979–1986: Delaware State
- 1986–1987: Florida A&M
- 1987–1998: Buffalo
- 2003–2005: Maryland Eastern Shore (interim AD)
- 2005–2007: Florida A&M
- 2014–2015: Florida A&M (interim AD)

Accomplishments and honors

Awards
- Mid-Eastern Athletic Conference (MEAC) Hall of Fame inductee (1995) Maryland Eastern Shore Hawks Hall of Fame Inductee (2012) National Association of Collegiate Directors of Athletics Hall of Fame Inductee (2012) Delaware State University Hall of Fame Inductee (2024) Posthumously

Nelson Elijah Townsend (May 16, 1941 – January 8, 2015) was an American college athletics administrator. Townsend served seven tenures as athletic director at four different universities: the University of Maryland Eastern Shore (1976–1979 and 2003–2005), Delaware State University (1979–1986), Florida A&M University (1986–1987, 2005–2007, and 2014–2015) and the University at Buffalo (1987–1998). He was the University at Buffalo's first African American athletic director. At both Delaware State and Buffalo, Townsend was responsible for leading the athletic department to achieve full NCAA Division I status, as both schools transitioned from lower levels of NCAA hierarchy. Townsend was inducted to the Mid-Eastern Athletic Conference Hall of Fame in 1995, was inducted to both the University of Maryland Eastern Shore and National Association of Collegiate Directors of Athletics Halls of Fame in 2012 and inducted in the Delaware State University Hall of Fame Class of 2024.

== Collegiate administration career ==
Townsend was hired in 1976 as interim director of athletics of University of Maryland Eastern Shore after nearly a decade as a well-respected teacher, coach, counselor and vice principal in the Worcester County Maryland school system and three years as executive director of Shore Up! Inc. in Salisbury, Maryland. Townsend stayed at the university until 1979 when the institution and University System of Maryland decided that the small school could not cover the expenses of a football team and comply with the regulations of Title IX.

In 1979 Townsend was hired by Delaware State College (currently Delaware State University) and in 1980 finalized the transition of Delaware State from a Division II laughing stock to a Division I school and the pride of the Mid-Eastern Athletic Conference. Delaware State College went on to win fifteen (15) MEAC team championships and capturing back to back Talmadge Hill Awards, the Mid-Eastern Athletic Conference's top overall men's program in 1984–85 and 1985–86 seasons. In 1980 the Delaware State Hornets were beaten by the Portland Viking 105–0 with Neil Lomax connected on 7 touchdown passes in the first quarter and Delaware State fumbled the ball sixteen times in the game. In 1981, Townsend made a bold appointment hiring Joseph Purzycki as the first white man to ever be named a head football coach at a historically black college or University. Twenty years later the Norfolk State Spartans hired the next white coach Pete Adrian. Townsend has, also, been credited for adding Super Bowl wide receiver John Taylor to the Delaware State Hornets in 1983 as the last scholarship player without Coach Purzycki's knowledge but to his pleasant surprise. Coach Purzycki and succeeding coach, William "Bill" Collick another Townsend hire, led the Hornets thru the glory years of Hornet football which included thirteen straight years of non-losing seasons and five conference championships. Coach Collick added a wrestling championship in 1983 during Townsend's tenure.

At Florida A&M University, Townsend was hired by the school in 1986 to guide the school back to the Mid-Eastern Athletic Conference after a failed attempt as an independent and again in 2005 after FAMU's failed attempt to be the first and only historically black college or University to move up to Division I-A status.

Townsend served the University at Buffalo for twelve years with the last two as associate vice president for student affairs. Townsend took the University at Buffalo from Division III to Division I in just three and one-half years and was the institution's first African-American director of athletics. While at the University at Buffalo, Townsend served as chairman of the NCAA Olympic Liaison Committee and was named an active member of the United States Olympic Committee. Buffalo hosted the 1993 World University Games and Townsend was awarded the "Buffalo Achievement Award" for his leadership in those games which 105 nations competed.

Townsend retired from athletics in 2000 to become the director of collaborative programs between Salisbury University and the University of Maryland Eastern Shore, only to be asked to return to his alma mater in 2003 to fill a void and FAMU again 2005 until 2007 to strengthen both programs.

On December 15, 2014, Florida A&M University president Dr. Elmira Mangum announced that Townsend had been named interim athletic director at Florida A&M, following the resignation of Kellen Winslow. It was Townsend's third stint as Florida A&M AD, following previous tenures from 1986 to 1987 and 2005 to 2007. On December 23, 2014, Townsend announced the hiring of Alex Wood as the new head football coach at Florida A&M. On January 8, 2015, Townsend collapsed on the Florida A&M campus while he was preparing for a staff meeting. He was rushed to Tallahassee Memorial HealthCare, where he was pronounced dead from a heart attack at the age of 73.
