= William Klinger =

Croatian historian (1972–2015)

- Born: 24 September 1972; Rijeka, SR Croatia, SFR Yugoslavia
- Died: 31 January 2015 (aged 42); Queens, New York, U.S.
- Cause of death: Gunshot wound
- Occupation: Historian

William Klinger (24 September 1972 − 31 January 2015) was a Croatian historian who specialized in modern Croatian and Yugoslav history as well as history of communism and nationalism.

== Biography ==
Klinger was born on 24 September 1972 in Rijeka, SFR Yugoslavia, but his family roots are reportedly in Pakrac and of German Jewish ethnic descent. He graduated summa cum laude from the University of Trieste in 1997 with a BA in history, while attending also the University of Klagenfurt due to a stipend he received from the Austrian government. He gained master's degree at the Central European University in Budapest and doctoral degree at the European University Institute in Florence, where he wrote his doctoral dissertation titled "Negotiating the Nation: Fiume, from Autonomism to State making 1848-1924".

Klinger lived in the Italian town of Gradisca d'Isonzo. An independent researcher, he was employed by the Centro di Ricerche Storiche di Rovigno (Center for Historical Research of Rovinj). Aside from Italian and Croatian Klinger also spoke German, English, Friulian, Russian and Slovene.

Klinger was found with a gunshot wound to the head on 31 January 2015 in Astoria Park in Queens, New York, where he had been attending a conference on former Yugoslavia, the Second World War and the post-war Balkans. He died the same day at Elmhurst Hospital, where he was taken after he was found lying near the park's public pool. His acquaintance Alexander Bonich was questioned by the police on the following day, when he admitted to killing Klinger. At trial, the prosecution accused Bonich of luring Klinger to the United States on false pretenses - Bonich offered to get Klinger an apartment in Astoria and set him up with a university job if Klinger gave him money. Klinger wired 68,000 euros to Bonich for a nonexistent apartment and job; the two apparently had a falling out after the fraud was discovered leading to Bonich shooting Klinger.

== Bibliography ==
- "Antonio Grossich e la nascita dei movimenti nazionali a Fiume", Quaderni, Centro ricerche storiche Rovigno, 1999 (XII).
- "La genesi dei movimenti nazionali a Fiume", in Fiume nel secolo dei grandi mutamenti; Atti del convegno, Edit, Fiume 2001.
- "Cesare Durando: frammenti della corrispondenza consolare (1887)", Atti, Volume XXXII, Centro ricerche storiche Rovigno, 2002.
- "La Carta del Carnaro: una costituzione per lo "Stato libero di Fiume (1920)", Quaderni, Volume XIV, Centro ricerche storiche Rovigno, 2003.
- "La storiografia di Fiume (1823 - 1924): una comunità immaginata?" Quaderni, Volume XV, Centro ricerche storiche Rovigno, 2004.
- "Dorotićeva policijska izvješća o Adamiću", in Adamićevo Doba (1780. - 1830.) Vol. I Muzej grada Rijeke, Rijeka, 2005, pp. 223–231.
- "Adamić i Hudelist: Doba restauracije", in Adamićevo Doba (1780. - 1830.) Vol. I Muzej grada Rijeke, Rijeka, 2005, pp. 233–239.
- "Prva globalizacija: kolonijalna ekspanzija i privilegirane trgovačke kompanije", in Adamićevo Doba (1780. - 1830.) Vol. II, Muzej grada Rijeke, Rijeka, 2006.
- "Emilio Caldara e Fiume", Quaderni, Centro ricerche storiche Rovigno, 2006 (XVII): 445-480.
- "Quando è nazione? Una rivisitazione critica delle teorie sul nazionalismo", Quaderni, Centro ricerche storiche Rovigno, 2006 (XVII): 399-420.
- "Le macchinazioni ragusee da repristinazione della loro Repubblica vanno sempre più realizzandosi: la tentata restaurazione della Repubblica di Ragusa nel 1814", Atti, Centro ricerche storiche Rovigno, 2009 (XXXVIII): 127-160.
- "Nascita ed evoluzione dell’apparato di sicurezza jugoslavo: 1941-1948", Fiume - Rivista di studi adriatici, 2009 (19): 13-49.
- "Lussino, dicembre 1944: operazione "Antagonise", Quaderni, Centro ricerche storiche Rovigno, 2009 (XX)
- "A.L.Adamich nei rapporti della Polizei-Hofstelle del 1810, Atti, Centro ricerche storiche Rovigno, 2009 (XXXIX): 331-358.
- "Roberto Oros di Bartini (Fiume 1897 - Mosca 1974)", La Ricerca, Centro ricerche storiche Rovigno, 2009.
- "Alcune considerazioni sulla guerra partigiana jugoslava 1941-1945", Fiume - Rivista di studi adriatici 2010 (21): 107-117.
- "Josip Broz Tito (1892-1980): un’intervista con Geoffrey Swain", Quaderni, Centro ricerche storiche Rovigno, 2010 (XXI): 377-425.
- "Note sulla presenza storica della Foca monaca nell'Adriatico", La Ricerca, Centro di ricerche storiche – Rovigno 2010 (57): 6–10.
- "Due memoriali inediti di Riccardo Zanella al Consiglio dei ministri degli esteri di Londra del settembre 1945", Fiume. Rivista di studi adriatici 2011 (23): 61 - 68.
- "Giuseppe Ludovico Cimiotti (1810-1892) e le problematiche origini della storiografia fiumana", Fiume. Rivista di studi adriatici 2011 (24): 49 - 64.
- "Nazionalismo civico ed etnico in Venezia Giulia", Ricerche Sociali, Centro di ricerche storiche – Rovigno 2011 (18):39-45
- "Le origini dei consigli nazionali: una prospettiva euroasiatica", Atti, Centro di ricerche storiche – Rovigno 2011 (XXXX): 435-473.
- GERMANIA E FIUME La questione fiumana nella diplomazia tedesca (1921-1924), Deputazione di Storia Patria per la Venezia Giulia, Trieste, 2011.
- "La Cunard nel Quarnero: la linea Fiume - New York (1904-1914)", Quaderni 2011 (XXII): 7-45.
- "Catture di Squalo Bianco (Carcharodon carcharias, Linnaeus, 1758) nel Quarnero 1872 – 1909", Atti, Centro di ricerche storiche – Rovigno 2011 (XLI): 479-524.
- "A vent’anni dalla dissoluzione della Jugoslavia: le radici storiche", Fiume. Rivista di studi adriatici 2012 (25): 67 - 71.
- "Crepuscolo adriatico. Nazionalismo e socialismo italiano in Venezia Giulia (1896 – 1945)", Quaderni, Centro ricerche storiche Rovigno, 2012 (XXIII): 79 - 126.
- IL TERRORE DEL POPOLO Storia dell'OZNA, la polizia politica di Tito, Italo Svevo, Trieste, 2012.
- "Dall’autonomismo alla costituzione dello Stato - Fiume 1848-1918", in Forme del politico. Studi di storia per Raffaele Romanelli, a cura di Emmanuel Betta, Daniela Luigia Caglioti, Elena Papadia, Viella, Roma 2012: 45 - 60.
- "Continuity Man: la visita di Stane Dolanc a Londra nel 1977", la battana, 187 (2013): 77 - 90.
- "Organizzazione del regime fascista nella Provincia del Carnaro (1934-1936)", Quaderni, Centro ricerche storiche Rovigno, 2013 (XXIV): 191 - 210.
- with Denis Kuljiš TITO - NEISPRIČANE PRIČE, Nezavisne novine, Banja Luka, 2013.
- (in press) "L’irredentismo impossibile: Fiume e l'Italia (1823 – 1923)", Atti e memorie della Società dalmata di storia patria, Roma 2013 (XXXV):
- (in press) "Jugoslavismo e nazionalismo nel carteggio Milovan Đilas - Mate Meštrović (1961-1981)", Ricerche Sociali, Centro di ricerche storiche – Rovigno 2014 (21):
- (in press) "Socialismo e questione adriatica dalla Grande guerra al Secondo conflitto mondiale", Perugia, 2014.
- (in press) "Un fronte unico da Trieste a Salonicco: La Venezia Giulia nella «Federazione Balcanica» (1918 – 1928)" Quaderni, Centro ricerche storiche Rovigno, 2014 (XXV):
