= Jack Kay =

American academic

Jack Kay (c. 1951 – January 30, 2015) was an American academic who was interim chancellor, provost and vice chancellor for academic affairs, and professor of communication at the University of Michigan-Flint.

Prior to joining the University of Michigan-Flint in September 2005, Kay was associate provost for student services and professor of communication at Wayne State University. Other positions held at Wayne State include associate provost for Global Initiatives, associate provost for assessment and retention, interim dean of the College of Urban, Labor, and Metropolitan Affairs, interim dean of the College of Fine, Performing, and Communication Arts, and chair of the Department of Communication. Kay was awarded a Ph.D. in communication from Wayne State University in 1979, an M.S. in speech communication from Southern Illinois University-Carbondale in 1975, and a B.A. in speech communication and political science from Wayne State University in 1974.

Kay is author of numerous articles and books, including Argumentation: Inquiry and Advocacy. Kay’s research specialty is the power of language. He has conducted extensive research on extremist groups, focusing on the communication strategies of groups such as the Ku Klux Klan, Aryan Nations, and Neo-Nazi Skinheads. In addition to publications in scholarly journals, Kay’s research is cited in newspapers, radio, and television. He has testified before the U.S. Civil Rights Commission and has been a consultant to law enforcement. He has received numerous awards for research, teaching, and service, including a 1999 Outstanding Graduate Mentor Award by the Wayne State University Graduate School. Kay has served as dissertation advisor to forty-four Ph.D. graduates in the discipline of communication. His research activity includes a grant from the U.S. Department of State to work on democratization efforts with journalists and press secretaries in Siberia, Russia. He was married to Ruth Kay, head of the Michigan's Debate MIFA league and debate couch at Detroit Country Day School.

== Sources ==
Information from UM-Flint Web site
