= Sharon Zukowski =

American novelist

Sharon Zukowski (1954/55 – January 9, 2015) was an American mystery novelist.

== Life and career ==
Zukowski was the creator of a series of novels featuring Blaine Stewart, a female former police officer turned private investigator who operates an agency with her sister. Zukowski's professional background was in the world of financial services, and many of her novels featured plot elements drawn from the corporate world. Her work has been described as "hard-boiled". At the time of her death she was a senior financial writer for UBS. Zukowski died in Hackensack, New Jersey.

== Works ==
List taken from:

(all featuring Blaine Stewart)

- The Hour of the Knife (1991)
- Dancing in the Dark (1992)
- Leap of Faith (1994)
- Prelude to Death (1996)
- Jungle Land (1997)
