= Willy Pfister =

Swiss ice hockey player

- Born: 1 March 1928; Switzerland
- Died: 14 January 2015 (aged 86)
- Position: Left Wing
- National team: Switzerland
- Playing career: 1944–1952

Willy Pfister (1 March 1928 – 14 January 2015) was a Swiss ice hockey player who competed for the Swiss national team at the 1952 Winter Olympics.
