= Piet van der Sanden =

Dutch politician and journalist (1924–2015)

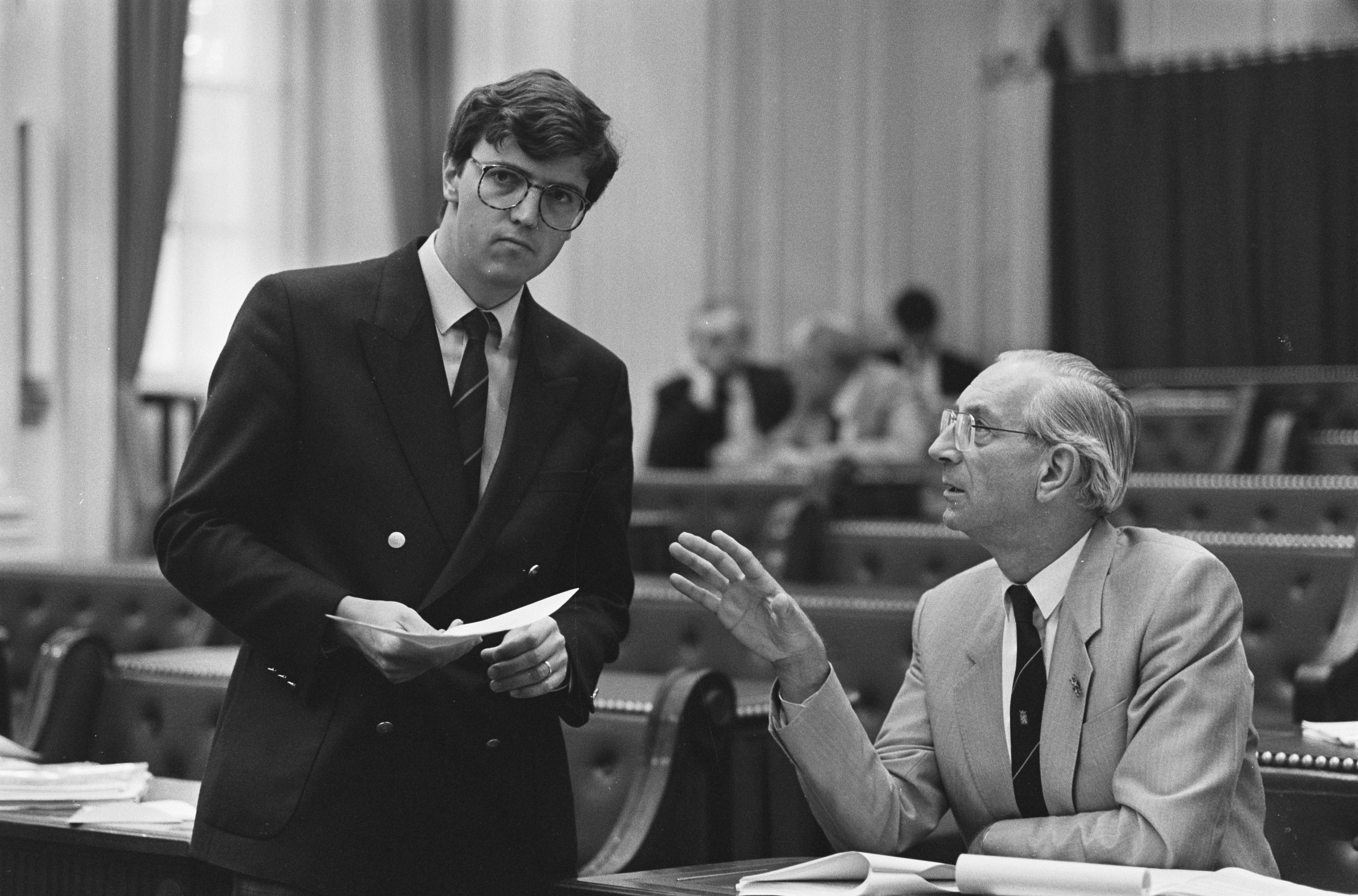
- Loek Hermans (left) with Piet van der Sanden in 1986

Member of the House of Representatives
- In office 11 May 1971 – 7 December 1972; 28 May 1973 – 14 September 1989

Member of the European Parliament
- In office 3 July 1973 – 3 October 1974

Personal details
- Born: 11 November 1924 Gouda, Netherlands
- Died: 18 January 2015 (aged 90) The Hague, Netherlands
- Party: Catholic People's Party (until 1980), Christian Democratic Appeal (from 1980)

Petrus Joannes Antonius "Piet" van der Sanden (11 November 1924 – 18 January 2015) was a Dutch politician and journalist. He was a member of the House of Representatives of the Netherlands between 1971 and 1972 and again from 1973 to 1989 for the Catholic People's Party and later the Christian Democratic Appeal. He also served a stint as member of the European Parliament between 1973 and 1974.

== Career ==
Van der Sanden was born in Gouda on 11 November 1924. During World War II he was studying at the gymnasium when he was sent to a working camp near Hannover in Germany. Shortly after the war ended he joined the British intelligence service. Between 1945 and 1947 he worked as a translator for British occupying forces in Germany. While there Van der Sanden met his future wife. Between 1947 and 1960 he worked as a journalist first for the De Nieuwe Zuidhollander and later for Het Binnenhof. Starting in 1960 he worked as a parliamentary journalist for Unitas- en Persuniecombinatie. His work in this position lasted until 1966.

Van der Sanden became politically involved in 1966 when he became parliamentary advisor and secretary to the Catholic People's Party. In the general election of 1971 he obtained a seat in the House of Representatives for the Catholic People's Party. He served a short stint until December 1972. He returned on 28 May 1973 and would serve until 14 September 1989 as member of the House. Between 3 July 1973 and 3 October 1974 he was member of the European Parliament, after having been appointed by the States General of the Netherlands. After his service in the House he became member of the Commissariaat voor de Media until October 1994.

Van der Sanden was made Knight in the Order of the Netherlands Lion on 27 April 1984.

He died on 18 January 2015 in The Hague.
