= Mickey Demos =

Greek doctor (1931–2015)

Menalaos Demos
- Born: 9 September 1931; Miami County, Florida, US
- Died: 19 January 2015 (aged 83)
- Occupations: Urologist, lawyer
- Spouse: Else
- Children: 2

Menelaos Demos, commonly known as Mickey Demos (9 September 1931 – 19 January 2015) was a Greek urologist, lawyer, boxer and pilot. His survey of boxing-injuries showed that 78% of head injuries occurred in those not wearing head protection, and that if safety rules in boxing are adhered to then fewer boxers sustain head injuries than footballers and baseball players.
