= Michael Fisher (lawyer) =

British solicitor

Michael Fisher (30 October 1946 – 7 January 2015) was a British solicitor, best known for his work representing those accused of terrorist offences during The Troubles in Northern Ireland.
