= Jean Hendriks =

Dutch politician (1925–2015)

Member of the Senate
- In office 10 June 1981 – 11 June 1991

Personal details
- Born: 18 August 1925 Valkenburg, Netherlands
- Died: 6 January 2015 (aged 89) Oosterbeek, Netherlands
- Party: Christian Democratic Appeal
- Education: Wageningen University and Research Centre

Jan Antoon Hubert "Jean" Hendriks (18 August 1925 – 6 January 2015) was a Dutch politician. He served as a member of the Senate of the Netherlands between 1981 and 1991 for the Christian Democratic Appeal. He spent most of his working life at the Nederlandsche Heidemaatschappij, including ten years as its director.

== Career ==
Hendriks was born on 18 August 1925 in Valkenburg. His father was the head of a primary school who would later serve in the States of Limburg. Hendriks followed his primary school education in Berg en Terblijt. For his high school education he went to the Henric van Veldeke College in nearby Maastricht, which he finished in May 1943. The next year Hendriks joined the regiment Stoottroepen of Limburg, which he was member of until the end of World War II.

After the war Hendriks went to the National Agricultural College in Wageningen to study Dutch agriculture. He obtained his degree in 1950. He continued studying agricultural sciences and obtained a doctorate in 1956.

Between 1950 and 1956 Hendriks worked for the Welvaartsfonds Suriname where he worked on a project concerning Lelydorp. Hendriks worked in various positions for the Nederlandsche Heidemaatschappij (NHM) between 1957 and 1983. The first six years he was stationed in Congo and later Belgium. Between 1973 and 1983 he was director of the Nederlandsche Heidemaatschappij association, which had been split off from the commercial part of the NHM. Hendriks subsequently became director of the International Institute for Land Reclamation, which he would stay until September 1990. During the 1970s Hendriks also served as chairman of the Nederlands Instituut van Landbouwkundig Ingenieurs (Netherlands Institute of Agricultural Engineers).

On 10 June 1981 Hendriks became member of the Senate for the Christian Democratic Appeal. In the Senate he became the party spokesperson for higher education and agriculture. He served until 11 June 1991.

Hendriks was made an officer in the Order of Orange-Nassau on 29 April 1992. He died on 6 January 2015 in Oosterbeek, aged 89.
