= Robert Dotson =

Robert Dotson (1923-2015) was a flatfoot dancer from Sugar Grove, North Carolina; he and his wife, Myrtle, were instrumental in keeping the tradition of flatfoot dancing styles of Western North Carolina alive, and they received the North Carolina Heritage Award in 1994. The couple, who grew up dancing in the same community, made a conscious decision and effort to keep alive the traditional flatfoot dance styles of western North Carolina, deliberately weaving the old-time flatfoot and buckdance steps into their dancing, even when many of their neighbors performed the latest clogging variations. They also hosted their own dances near their home in Sugar Grove.

== Early years ==
Dancers from around the world would visit the Dotsons in North Carolina to learn what came to be named the Dotson Walking Step. The Dotsons hosted dances at their home and "dance shack," a little house that Robert built across the street from where he lived. It didn’t have many rooms, so there was plenty of open space to dance. Friend and fellow dancer Rodney Sutton began attending these gatherings in the 1970s. He said that they featured a “big revival of young folks moving into the High Country and playing old-time music” – in particular the Corklickers, a band that is still around today.

In the 1970s, the Green Grass Cloggers, a touring company based in North Carolina that featured old-time dancing, learned Robert's "walking" step and incorporated it into their performances. The Dotsons were Master Artists in residence during Dance Week at the Augusta Heritage Center in Elkins, West Virginia. They earned first prize at numerous dance contests in their section of the Blue Ridge. As part of their commitment to traditional dance, they drove once a week to Elizabethton, Tennessee, to lead square dances and to demonstrate their flatfoot styles.

Footworks, a nationally known dance troupe from New York, contacted the Dotsons after learning about their mastery of old-time flatfooting style, requesting to come watch him in hopes of learning some of his moves. The troupe of about a dozen dancers stayed in the cabin’s bunk loft for three nights. They danced every day and every night while they were visiting the Dotsons, and Robert remained good friends with one of the group's original members.

== Biography ==
Robert Dotson was born on May 13, 1923, to Don and Bina Hicks Dotson; he died on Tuesday, Jan.13, 2015, at the age of 91. Both sides of his family were talented dancers.

Myrtle Cook Dotson was born in 1921 and died in 2008. Robert referred to his style of dancing as flatfooting; Myrtle referred to hers as the Charleston, a dance that was popular with women of her generation.

In addition to being a dancer, Robert Dotson was a farmer and a skilled carpenter. When he was 14, his father fell off the back of a truck and died, so Robert, as the oldest male in the immediate family, quit school to work and help his mother raise his seven brothers and sisters, according to Rodney Sutton, a longtime friend and fellow dancer.

== Death ==
According to Dotson's obituary in the High Country Press, Dotson’s greatest influence was his grandfather, Ab Dotson, a banjo player and buck dancer. When he was younger, the two would hitchhike to Boone to watch a movie at the Appalachian Theatre in downtown. After a while of walking and waiting for a ride, Dotson would tell his grandpa that he was too tired. And Ab would then say, “Let’s just dance a little bit.” Robert's parents, Don Dotson and Bina Jane Hicks Dotson, were both well known dancers in the community. The Dotsons' children and grandchildren have learned from them. Myrtle remembered dancing a lot at home when she was a child, often to recorded music played on an old crank-up Victrola.

At the time of his death in 2015, Dotson was survived by two daughters, Peggy Coffey of Lenoir and Annalee Wood and husband Edsel of Sugar Grove, four sisters, Gladyce Bradshaw and Eunice Bushburger of Wilkesboro, Lilly Speaks and Lois Nivens both of Charlotte, and a dear friend, Rodney Sutton of Marshall, seven grandchildren, 12 great grandchildren, 20 great-great grandchildren, and 22 nieces and nephews. In addition to his parents, he was preceded in death by his wife, Myrtle Cook Dotson, one sister; Donnie Burton and two brothers; Charles Walter and Albert Billy Dotson.
