= Pietro Pianta =

Italian footballer and manager

Pietro Pianta (2 October 1940 – 18 January 2015) was an Italian football goalkeeper and manager.

Born in Pontelongo, in 1958 Pietro Pianta played as a goalkeeper for Calcio Padova, Anconitana, Atalanta B.C., U.S. Cremonese and Vicenza Calcio. After his playing career, he had a career as a goalkeeper coach in Calcio Como and U.S. Cremonese.
