= Chuck Burr =

American sports executive and administrator

Personal information
- Born: June 1, 1923
- Died: January 13, 2015 (aged 91); Getzville, New York, U.S.

Career information
- High school: Kenmore
- College: Buffalo State

Career history
- Buffalo Bills (1960–1963) Director of media and public relations; Buffalo Bills (1964–1965) Assistant general manager; Miami Dolphins (1966) General manager

Awards and highlights
- 2-time AFL champion (1964, 1965)
- Executive profile at Pro Football Reference

Charles "Chuck" Burr (June 1, 1923 – January 13, 2015) was an executive and administrator in the AFL and NHL. He was the general manager for the Miami Dolphins in their first season (1966). He was the assistant general manager of the Buffalo Bills from 1964 to 1965. He also was a Public and Media Relations Director for the Buffalo Sabres in the 1970s. Burr worked at the Buffalo Raceway for a long time after his AFL and NHL career. He died on January 13, 2015, in Getzville, New York, at the age of 91.
