= Lloyd House (politician) =

American politician (1931–2015)

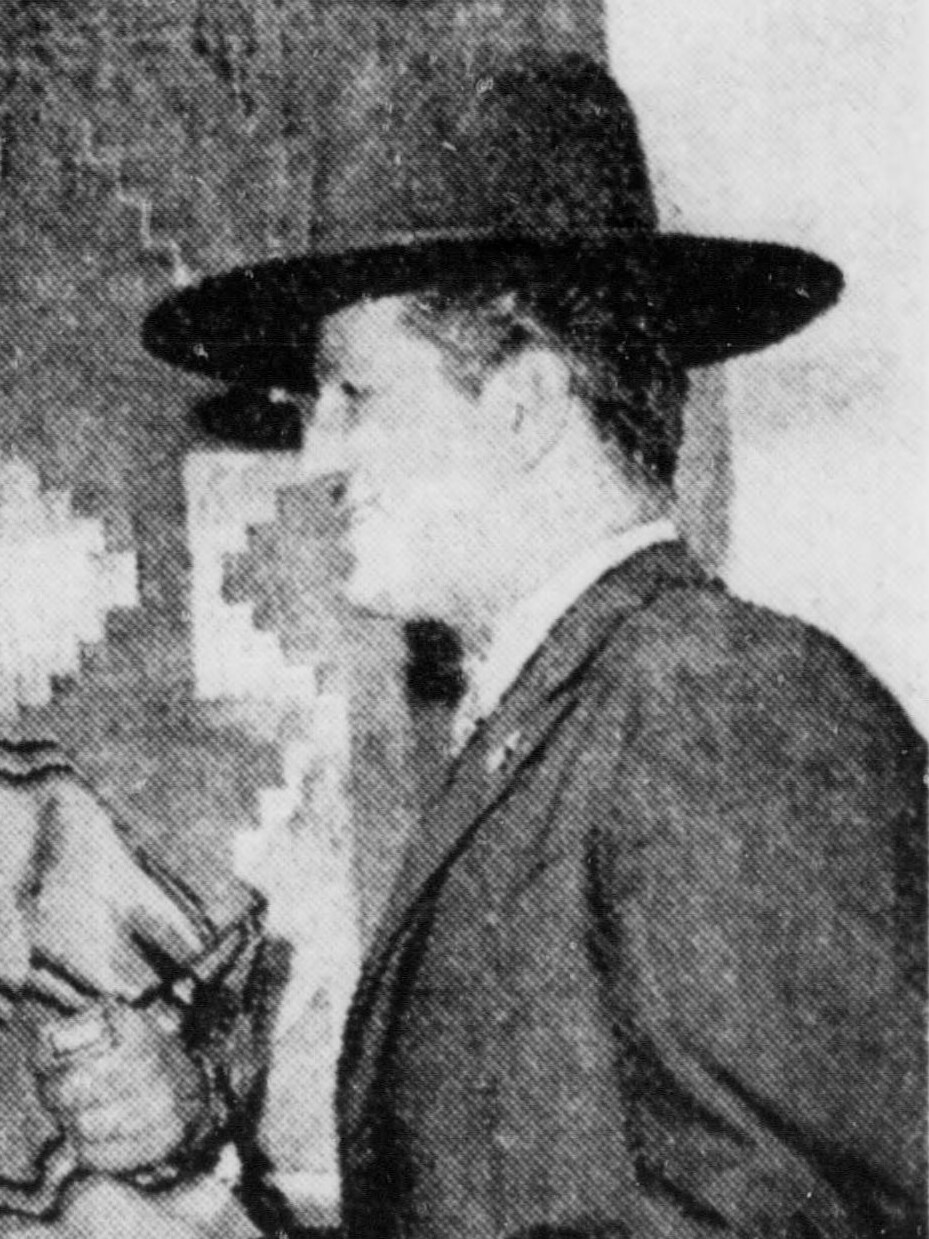
- House in 1967

Member of the Arizona House of Representatives from the 3rd district
- In office 1967–1968

Personal details
- Born: October 24, 1931 Winslow, Arizona
- Died: January 2, 2015 (aged 83) Surprise, Arizona
- Spouse: Victoria House
- Occupation: Teacher

Lloyd Lynn House (October 24, 1931 – January 2, 2015) was an American politician. A Navajo and Oneida, he was the first Native American lawmaker in Arizona. He was a member of the Arizona House of Representatives from 1967 to 1968. He served as a Marine during the Korean War from 1950 to 1954, and in the U.S. Air Force Reserves during the Vietnam War. During his time in the service, he became a renowned amateur boxer and was known for his brawler style and toughness. Those athletic attributes were instrumental in his transition to a professional where he became a champion welterweight before retiring.

After his boxing career, House attended Arizona State University where he achieved his doctorate in American Indian studies. He used his degree and experience to guide and mentor other Indian veterans seeking meaningful employment. He dedicated much of his time assisting and guiding other Indians out of their impoverished circumstances. He later went on to start his own boxing gym which became a place of safety and refuge for at-risk teens.

He and his wife, Victoria House, remained married until his death in January 2015. He was 83.
