= Henryk Podlewski =

Polish medical doctor

Henryk Podlewski OBE (26 April 1920 – 8 January 2015) was a Polish medical doctor who completed his studies at the Polish School of Medicine at the University of Edinburgh during World War II and became the first psychiatrist to practice in the Bahamas.

== Early life and education ==
Henryk Podlewski was born in Zawiercie on 26 April 1920. He was the only child of Henryk Podlewski and Maria Gorczycka Podlewska. In 1937, he passed the Matura, the high school leaving certificate, at the Zamojski Secondary School in Warsaw. He then went directly from school to the Warsaw University Faculty of Medicine. He was 19 when German troops entered Poland.

== War experience ==
At the onset of World War II, Podlewski joined a medical unit attached to the Ministry of War. As the situation in Poland was worsening he was evacuated into Romania and travelled on to France. In France, he joined the Polish Army and was assigned to the Polish Independent Carpathian Rifle Brigade in Syria in 1940. With the brigade included in the Polish II Corps and attached to the British Eight Army, Dr Podlewski actively served in the Libyan Campaign. In 1941, after 2 years in the army, including nine months in the besieged Tobruk (Operation Battleaxe), he was released from the army and subsequently travelled to the United Kingdom.

== Career ==
=== Medical studies and psychiatry training ===
Podlewski reached England in autumn 1941 and was transferred to Scotland to complete his studies at the Polish School of Medicine in Edinburgh. He obtained his medical diploma on 9 December 1947. Following graduation, he travelled to London where he obtained his Psychiatry training at the Saint Bernard's Hospital. In 1953, after a five-year residency in London, Podlewski was asked to move to the Bahamas.

=== Medical practice in the Bahamas ===
In 1953, Podlewski moved to the Caribbean and became the first psychiatrist to practice on the Bahamas. This was facilitated by an Act of Parliament that was created specially for him (The Henryk Podlewski (Private Practice) Act No. 66 of 1957). Over 32 years of service as the Chief Psychiatrist, Podlewski's contributions included planning of a new hospital which was completed and commissioned in 1956 (the Sandilands Rehabilitation Centre). His efforts led to the establishment of the Bahamas Mental Health Association in 1967. In recognition of his conduct he was made an Officer of the Order of the British Empire (OBE) by Her Majesty Queen Elizabeth. He also received numerous awards including: Paul Harris Fellow (1979), Rotarian Award, the Distinguished Citizen Award (1975), the Golden Heart Award (1981), and the Bahamas Government Silver Jubilee Award (1988).

== Personal life ==
Podlewski married Sandra Bethell in London in 1969. The couple had a son born in 1970.
