= John Paice =

Australian rules footballer

Personal information
- Full name: John Thomas Paice
- Born: 4 December 1931
- Died: 12 January 2015 (aged 83)
- Original team: Yallourn
- Height: 180 cm (5 ft 11 in)
- Weight: 77 kg (170 lb)

Playing career^{1}
Years	Club	Games (Goals)
1955	Carlton	4(0)
- ^{1} Playing statistics correct to the end of 1955.

John Thomas Paice (4 December 1931 – 12 January 2015) was an Australian rules footballer who played with Carlton in the Victorian Football League (VFL).
