= Bob Sadino =

Indonesian businessman

- Born: Bambang Mustari Sadino; 9 March 1933; Oosthaven, Lampung, Dutch East Indies
- Died: 19 January 2015 (aged 81); Jakarta, Indonesia
- Other names: Om Bob (Uncle Bob), Oom Bipsy

Bambang Mustari "Bob" Sadino (9 March 1933 – 19 January 2015) was an Indonesian businessman who was the CEO of Kem Chicks, Kem Foods, and Kem Farms. He started his business by selling domestic chicken eggs door to door. At that time, domestic chicken eggs were not popular in Indonesia, thus his goods were purchased only by expatriates, who lived in Kemang (an area in South Jakarta, Indonesia), as well as a few Indonesians who had lived abroad before. Over time, the domestic chicken eggs became popular and Sadino's business grew significantly. Sadino then expanded his business by selling chicken meat.

He released two books containing his unique view of doing business. He illustrates that a stupid man will start doing business as soon as an idea pops into his head, while an educated man will spend his time thinking about which ideas need to be applied, with the risk that none will become reality. Sadino also emphasizes that theory without practice is nothing. Furthermore, he also has a unique trademark in that he usually wears short-sleeved shirts and shorts on most occasions. Even when he met Suharto, a former Indonesian president, he stuck with his style of dress.

== Biography ==
Sadino was born into an affluent family. He was the youngest among his four siblings. his parents passed away when Sadino was still 19 years old. He inherited all of his family properties as his siblings were considered to have prosperous lives. Sadino then spent his money to travel around the world. He stopped at the Netherlands and settled there for approximately 9 years. In the Netherlands, he worked at Djakarta Lloyd in Amsterdam and also in Hamburg, Germany. Sadino also met his wife, Soelami Soejoed, in the Netherlands.

=== The Return to Indonesia ===
In 1967, Sadino and his family returned to Indonesia. He brought along his two Mercedes cars, and later sold one to buy a plot of land in Kemang, South Jakarta. After living in Indonesia for a long time, Sadino decided to quit his job to work independently. He first worked as a taxi driver, using his Mercedes. After his car was badly damaged in an accident, Sadino switched to working as a mason. His income at that time was only IDR 100 (equal to US$0.01 or 1 cent). He experienced great depression due to the pressures of his life.

=== Resurrection ===
One day, Sadino's friend recommended him to do a poultry business focusing on domestic chicken (imported chicken) eggs to fight his depression. Sadino was interested and began to develop a chicken farm. At that time local chicken (native chicken, smaller than domestic chicken) still dominated the Indonesian market. Sadino was the one who first introduced domestic chicken and their eggs in Indonesia. Sadino sold domestic eggs door to door. At that time, domestic chicken eggs were not popular in Indonesia so that his goods were only purchased by immigrants(such as Americans, Europeans), who resided in Kemang, as well as few people who had lived abroad. Over time, domestic chicken eggs began to be known throughout Indonesia so that Sadino's business grew rapidly. Sadino then expanded his business by selling chicken meat. Besides introducing the domestic chicken eggs, he also was the first man to apply a hydroponic farming systems in Indonesia. In the early 1985, the average sales per month of Sadino's companies was 40-50 tons of raw meat, 60-70 tons of processed meat, and 100 tons of fresh vegetables.

== Books ==
Bob Sadino likes to share his knowledge. "I do not want to bring anything when I die, my knowledge should be shared with this world," he said. He has released two books to date, Mereka Bilang Saya Gila! written by Edy Zaqeus and Belajar Goblok dari Bob Sadino written by Dodi Mawardi.

Mereka Bilang Saya Gila! (en: They Said I'm Crazy!). This book is not his biography, but a book of provocation that encourages people, especially those who have a bachelor's degree, to make a paradigm shift. The paradigm says that theory without practice is nonsense or nothing. Furthermore, he says the movement of entrepreneurship is the trigger of Indonesian revival. The book also reveals Sadino's original concepts about the world of entrepreneurship, education revolution, business art, and discussion of the ideal of leadership in the eyes of a true entrepreneur.

Belajar Goblok dari Bob Sadino (en: Stupid Learning from Bob Sadino). This book consists of four Bob Sadino's main ideas, such as the following expression: "A smart man usually has smart ideas, maybe even too many ideas, and in the end none of his ideas become reality. While a stupid man may has only one stupid idea and that idea is his only choice and then he applies it." The writing of this book is entirely inspired by the figure of a unique, and controversial Bob Sadino. Sadino also said, "If you want to be an entrepreneur, you better not think and plan like a smart person, instead, 'just do it' like a moron."

== Style of Dress ==
Sadino is often visited by Indonesian presidents, such as Suharto, Megawati Sukarnoputri and Susilo Bambang Yudhoyono. For most people, when they meet an important person, they will always try to look good and wear neat clothes. This is contrary to Bob Sadino who does not hesitate to wear shorts when he meets important persons, as if his shorts is his trademark. Even when invited by the MPR, he still preferred to wear his shorts to the point where he was scolded by the staff to "dress nicely".
