= Patricia Roppel =

Patricia Ann Roppel (April 5, 1938 – January 6, 2015) was a historian, writer and educator who specialized in the history of Southeast Alaska. She had thirteen books and more than 100 articles published during her career. Much of her work focused on the people and locations of that particular region, as well as the state's major industries, including mining, salmon fishing and hatcheries, and canning. She was named "Alaska Historian of the Year" by the Alaska Historical Society in 1978 and 2006 in recognition of books released during those years.

Roppel was born Patricia Snowden on April 5, 1938, in Ellensburg, Washington, to Richard and Helen Snowden. She received a degree in home economics from Oregon State University. Roppel moved from Washington to Alaska in 1959. She originally worked as a home economics teacher at Ketchikan High School in Ketchikan, Alaska, from 1959 to 1965. Roppel published her first article in 1965.

Alaska Governor Jay Hammond appointed Roppel to the new Alaska Historical Commission in 1975. The Commission oversaw the creation of a new high school textbook on the history of Alaska and advised state lawmakers on related issues. She was reappointed for three terms on the Commission from 1975 until 1983. In 1991, Governor Wally Hickel appointed Roppel to the Alaska Humanities Forum, a position she held until 1996. She was reappointed to the Alaska Historical Commission in 2003 by Governor Tony Knowles. She remained on the Commission until her death in 2015, including a tenure as Vice-Chair of the Commission from 2006 to 2008.

Roppel and her husband originally lived in Ketchikan, Alaska. They moved to Sitka, Alaska, in 1983, and to Wrangell, Alaska, in 1992. Patricia Roppel died from cancer in Bellevue, Washington, on January 6, 2015, at age 76.

== Selected works ==
- (1978) Southeast, Alaska's panhandle
- (1979) Sex in a bucket versus sex in a stream bed, or, Salmon hatchery programs in Alaska's past
- (1982) Alaska's salmon hatcheries, 1891–1959
- (1983) Southeast Alaska : a pictorial history
- (1986) Salmon from Kodiak : an history of the salmon fishery of Kodiak Island, Alaska
- (1991) Fortunes from the earth : an history of the base and industrial minerals of southeast Alaska
- (1995) An historical guide to Revillagigedo and Gravina Islands, Alaska
- (1996) Index of Alaska obituaries from various sources with a supplement of obituaries from sources in the Ketchikan area collected by Patricia Roppel [1899–1995]
- (1998) Land of mists : Revillagigedo & Gravina Islands, Misty Fiords National Monument, Alaska
- (1999) "Where can I buy one of these?" : a history of Ketchikan, Alaska's business community
- (2000) Misty Fiords National Monument Wilderness, Alaska
- (2004) The steamer Albatross and early Pacific salmon, Oncorhynchus spp., research in Alaska
- (2005) Striking it rich! : gold mining in southern Southeast Alaska
