= Joy Ali =

Fijian boxer

Personal information
- Nickname: Jet
- Nationality: (Fiji) Fijian
- Born: Zulfikar Joy Ali; 22 December 1978 Nadi, Fiji
- Died: 5 January 2015 (aged 36) Suva, Fiji
- Weight: Middleweight

Boxing career
- Stance: Orthodox

Boxing record
- Total fights: 51
- Wins: 31
- Win by KO: 26
- Losses: 13
- Draws: 6
- No contests: 1

Zulfikar Joy Ali (22 December 1978 – 5 January 2015) was a Fijian boxer. He had won 31 boxing matches in his career.

== Boxing career ==
In 1995, Ali's first reported boxing match was against Raven, whom he defeated in the fourth round by a KO at the National Indoor Stadium, Suva, Fiji. He won the vacant Pan Asian Boxing Association (PABA) light middleweight title against the former World Amateur bronze medalist Ercüment Aslan of Turkey.

== Personal life ==
Ali was a very religious person and followed the Islamic faith. He sold razor blades with his younger brother to start off his boxing career. Ali died on 5 January 2015, aged 36, at the CWM Hospital in Suva. His death was a suicide. Ali was survived by his wife and three children.
