= Maher Hathout =

Maher Hathout (January 1, 1936 – January 3, 2015) was a leading American-Muslim community leader of Egyptian origin. Hathout helped found the Muslim Public Affairs Council and spoke extensively against Islamic radicalism.

Born in Cairo, Egypt in 1936, Hathout eventually moved to Buffalo, New York, and then to Los Angeles. He immersed himself in volunteering at the Islamic Center of Southern California (ICSC) as Chairman and Spokesperson. The Islamic Center became a vehicle for a vision of Islam in America that is rooted in what Hathout called the definition of home: "Home is not where my grandparents are buried, but where my grandchildren will be raised."

Hathout stressed throughout his life that being a faithful Muslim was entirely compatible with being a proud American, and that Islam is a religion of coexistence, reason and moderation. While he criticized Salman Rushdie’s book The Satanic Verses, finding it "insulting", he also condemned Ayatollah Khomeini's fatwa against him and defended his right to free speech. (He faced death threats from Muslims because of his stance.)

He was also among the pioneers of interfaith engagement within the American Muslim community, helping found the Religious Coalition Against War in the Middle East with Rev. George Regas and Rabbi Leonard Beerman in 1991. Hathout was a charter member of the Pacific Council on International Policy, the western partner of the Council on Foreign Relations, and served on the board of directors of the Interfaith Alliance and Claremont Lincoln University.

Over the years, Hathout was invited repeatedly to Capitol Hill and the State Department to address a variety of topics, such as "Islam and U.S. Policy," "Islamic Democracy," "Emerging Trends in Islamic Movements," and "The Future of the Middle East." He was also the first Muslim invited to give the invocation prayer at the Democratic National Convention in 2000, as well as a benediction at the Republican National Convention that same year.

Hathout was the recipient of many awards, including the George Regas Courageous Peacemaker Award, the Islamic Shura Council of Southern California's Lifetime Service Award, the South Coast Interfaith Council Award for his lifelong commitment to interfaith work and the Los Angeles County John Allen Buggs Award for excellence in human relations. He died of cancer in Duarte, California on January 3, 2015.
