= Marshall Schlom =

Marshall Ivan Schlom (March 3, 1928 – January 21, 2015) was an American script supervisor who worked on many popular Hollywood films and television series in a career spanning four decades. He was also a member of the Academy of Motion Picture Arts and Sciences foreign film committee for almost the same amount of time. He was most noted for his work on Alfred Hitchcock's Psycho, Barry Levinson's Rain Man, and his multiple collaborations with such filmmakers as Stanley Kramer, Mike Nichols, and Arthur Penn.

== Biography ==
Schlom was born on March 3, 1928, in Los Angeles, California. His father was Herman Schlom, a Latvian immigrant who became a producer at RKO Pictures. The younger Schlom attended college at University of California, Berkeley, and graduated from UCLA. Upon graduating, he sought to join his father at RKO. Because studio chief Howard Hughes would not permit relatives of employees to be hired, Schlom submitted his résumé under the name of Michael Scott and landed a job. He worked in an uncredited capacity during his time at RKO.

In late 1959, Schlom was hired by Alfred Hitchcock to serve as the director's script supervisor on his legendary horror film, Psycho. Schlom was then recruited by Stanley Kramer to be script supervisor on the Academy Award-winning Judgment at Nuremberg. Schlom worked with Kramer on nearly all of the latter's subsequent films over the next 15 years, including It's a Mad, Mad, Mad, Mad World, Ship of Fools, Guess Who's Coming to Dinner, The Secret of Santa Vittoria, Bless the Beasts and Children, Oklahoma Crude, and The Domino Principle.

Schlom was the script supervisor on William Wyler's Funny Girl and was later recruited by Herbert Ross to work on that film's sequel, Funny Lady. Schlom again collaborated with Ross on The Sunshine Boys and California Suite. He also worked with director Richard Brooks on three films: The Happy Ending, $, and Looking for Mr. Goodbar. Director Michael Ritchie recruited Schlom for numerous films as well, namely The Bad News Bears, The Island, The Golden Child, Wildcats, and Fletch.

In addition, Schlom worked on two films each with Arthur Penn (The Chase and Night Moves), John Huston (Fat City and Annie), Franklin J. Schaffner (Papillon and Islands in the Stream), James Bridges (The China Syndrome and Mike's Murder), Colin Higgins (9 to 5 and The Best Little Whorehouse in Texas), Mike Nichols (Silkwood and Postcards from the Edge), and Mel Brooks (Robin Hood: Men in Tights and Dracula: Dead and Loving It). His many other films include Peter Bogdanovich's The Last Picture Show, Elaine May's Mikey and Nicky, Mark Rydell's On Golden Pond, Barry Levinson's Rain Man, and John Hughes' Uncle Buck.

Schlom retired in 1995. He died on January 21, 2015, due to complications from a fall at the Motion Picture & Television Country House and Hospital in Woodland Hills, Los Angeles. He was 86.
