= Martha Whitmore Hickman =

Martha Whitmore Hickman (December 9, 1925 – January 17, 2015) was an American author.

Hickman grew up in Massachusetts. She received her B.A. in English literature, Phi Beta Kappa, from Mount Holyoke College in 1947. She was the author of a number of inspirational and other self-help books. She was a Christian.
