= Doug Luke =

Douglas Luke (10 January 1929, Sunbury-on-Thames – 3 January 2015) was an English stills photographer, known for his work with the Beatles and Gerry Anderson.

After National Service with the RAF in Singapore and Malaya, he joined Denham Film Studios as a darkroom printer, later moving into stills photography at Twickenham Film Studios. His assignments included the Beatles' film Help! (1965).

As a freelance photographer for Century 21 Merchandising, Luke took stills for all of Anderson's TV productions from Thunderbirds to UFO. Like other members of the Century 21 Productions staff, director David Lane had his passport picture taken by Luke.

Luke died of dementia on 3 January 2015, aged 85.
