= Adalberto Arturo Rosat =

Italian Roman Catholic bishop

Adalberto Arturo Rosat OFM
- Prelate of Aiquile
- Church: Catholic Church
- See: Territorial Prelature of Aiquile
- In office: 22 November 1986 – 25 March 2009
- Predecessor: Jacinto Eccher
- Successor: Jorge Herbas Balderrama

Orders
- Ordination: 13 July 1958
- Consecration: 1 February 1987 by Santos Abril y Castelló

Personal details
- Born: 22 January 1934 Cles, Trentino, Kingdom of Italy
- Died: 31 January 2015 (aged 81)

Adalberto Arturo Rosat (22 January 1934 – 31 January, 2015) was a Roman Catholic bishop.

Ordained to the priesthood in 1958, Rosat was named bishop of the Roman Catholic Territorial Prelature of Aiquile, Bolivia, in 1987. He retired in 2009.
