= Gobernador Mansilla =

- Municipality and village
- Location within Argentina
- Coordinates: 32°33′S 59°22′W
- Country: Argentina
- Province: Entre Ríos Province
- Time zone: UTC−3 (ART)
- CPA base: 2845

Gobernador Mansilla is a village and municipality in Entre Ríos Province in north-eastern Argentina.
