= Territorial Prelature of Aiquile =

Catholic particular church territory

Territorial Prelature of Aiquile Praelatura Territorialis Aiquilensis Prelatura Territorial de Aiquile

Catholic

Location
- Country: Bolivia
- Ecclesiastical province: Cochabamba
- Metropolitan: Cochabamba

Statistics
- Area: 23,325 km^{2} (9,006 sq mi)
- Population: Total; Catholics: (as of 2004); 220,000; 190,000 (86.4%)
- Parishes: 14

Information
- Denomination: Roman Catholic
- Rite: Roman Rite
- Established: 11 December 1961 (64 years ago)
- Cathedral: Cathedral of St Peter in Aiquile

Current leadership
- Pope: Leo XIV
- Prelate: Jorge Herbas Balderrama, O.F.M.
- Metropolitan Archbishop: Oscar Omar Aparicio Céspedes

Map

Website
- www.diocesisdeoruro.org

The Territorial Prelature of Aiquile (Latin: Praelatura Territorialis Aiquilensis) is a territorial prelature located in the city of Aiquile in the ecclesiastical province of Cochabamba in Bolivia.

== History ==
- December 11, 1961: Established as Territorial Prelature of Aiquile from the Diocese of Cochabamba

== Leadership ==
- Prelates of Aiquile (Roman rite), listed in reverse chronological order
  - Bishop Jorge Herbas Balderrama, O.F.M. (2009.03.25 Mar - ...)
  - Bishop Adalberto Arturo Rosat, O.F.M. (1986.11.22 – 2009.03.25)
  - Bishop Jacinto Eccher, O.F.M. (1961.12.16 – 1986.11.22)
- Coadjutor prelate
  - Jorge Herbas Balderrama, O.F.M. (2006-2009)

== See also ==
- Roman Catholicism in Bolivia
