= The Hour of the Knife =

1992 novel by Sharon Zukowski

- Author: Sharon Zukowski
- Language: English
- Genre: Crime novel
- Publisher: St. Martin's Press
- Publication date: 1992
- Publication place: United States
- Pages: 208
- Preceded by: Dancing in the Dark

The Hour of the Knife is a crime novel by American author Sharon Zukowski, published in 1992 by St. Martin's Press. The story follows a Manhattan private detective, Blaine Stewart, as she attempts to unravel a mystery while on vacation. The novel is the first in a series of five to feature the Blaine Stewart character.

== Summary ==
Blaine Stewart, a private detective from Manhattan, visits the Carolina coast for a vacation. While there, she receives a call from a former friend who is killed shortly afterwards. Stewart must solve the crime, along with uncovering drug trafficking and other crimes in the coastal retreat.

== Reception ==
The novel received mixed reviews. Publishers Weekly praised the novel's pacing and characters. Kirkus Reviews described the book as a "cliche-riddled debut", featuring "comic-book villains and ineffective attempts at hard-boiled dialogue."
