= Henk Bloemers =

Dutch footballer

Personal information
- Date of birth: 17 September 1945
- Place of birth: Eindhoven, Netherlands
- Date of death: 26 January 2015 (aged 69)
- Place of death: Eindhoven, Netherlands
- Position: Central defender

Senior career*
Years	Team	Apps	(Gls)
1964–1984	FC Eindhoven	605	(54)
- * Club domestic league appearances and goals

Henk Bloemers (17 September 1945 – 26 January 2015) was a Dutch footballer who played as a central defender.

== Club career ==
A central defender, Bloemers spent his entire career with FC Eindhoven, amassing a record total of 641 official games in which he scored 58 goals. Hence, he was regarded as Mister Eindhoven by the club and supporters. In 20 years with the club, he only had two seasons in the Eredivisie. He played his final game in a 1-7 loss at FC Twente in May 1984, a game he had to leave early due to injury.

== Death and legacy ==
A stand in Eindhoven's Jan Louwers Stadion was named after him in 2006 and he was named honorary member of the club in 2012. He died in January 2015, aged 69.
