= Howard Madole =

American architect (1923–2015)

Howard Madole (April 29, 1923 - January 29, 2015) was an architect who was most known for building homes in the Sedona, Phoenix, and surrounding areas of Arizona. His influence as an architect, especially during the development and growth of Sedona in the 1950s and 1960s, led to him being called "the first architect of Sedona".

== Biography ==
In 1948, after graduating with a degree in science and commerce from the University of Iowa, Madole moved to Arizona after his parents purchased 10 acres of land in West Sedona. Madole designed and built his first house with his family using a mud concoction containing recycled asphalt to add strength to the bricks that they had invented. Built in 1948, the Madole-Rigby House was identified as being the oldest adobe construction in Sedona, and one of the town's most threatened pieces of architecture. Madole continued to learn the construction business and carpentry and by 1952 owned the largest construction business in Northern Arizona.

Through his involvement with Taliesin West, he worked with Frank Lloyd Wright where he helped to build the Usonian design structure there. Madole went on to pioneer his own style with signature elements, including the use of local stone, wood 2x4s on edge for roofing materials, flared roof lines, unusual pitched and shaped structures, and fireplaces that penetrated large glass walls. Over the years, Madole not only created innovative designs, but built the largest construction business in Northern Arizona and built award winning homes and contemporary commercial buildings in Phoenix. Several of his signature homes survive in Sedona, and four have been designated Sedona Historic Landmarks.

Madole moved to Phoenix in 1966, and went on to design hundreds of residential and commercial buildings all over Arizona, including the former Northwestern Mutual Life building located on the southwest corner of Third Street and Osborn.

He died in Prescott, Arizona on January 29, 2015.
