= Richard M. Watt =

American historian and author (c.1933–2015)

- Born: Richard Martin Watt; November 10, 1930; La Grange, Illinois, United States
- Died: January 25, 2015 (aged 81–82); Montclair, New Jersey, United States
- Occupations: Historian; Writer

Richard M. Watt (November 10, 1930 – January 25, 2015) was an American historian and writer.

== Biography ==
Richard Martin Watt was born on November 10, 1930, in La Grange, Illinois, United States. Watt attended Glen Ridge High School in Essex County, New Jersey, before reading English at Dartmouth College, graduating in the class of 1952. After graduating, Watt was commissioned as an ensign and spent three years serving in the United States Navy.

In 1963, Watt published his first book, Dare Call It Treason: The True Story of the French Army Mutinies of 1917.

Watt published his second book, The Kings Depart: The Tragedy of Germany: Versailles and the German Revolution in 1968.

In 1979, he published his third book, Bitter Glory, Poland and Its Fate, 1918–1939. The New York Times praised the book for telling a "dramatic tale dramatically" and delivering 'forceful' portraits and 'sound' judgments, but described Watt's concern for historical context or analysis as "remarkably modest". Anna M. Cienciala in the Slavic Review, broadly praised the work, describing it as a "well-written and well-balanced study of interwar Poland", but was critical of Watt's writings on foreign policy.

Watt was a long-term supporter of and donor to the Józef Piłsudski Institute of America.

Watt died on January 25, 2015, at Mountainside Medical Center in Montclair, New Jersey.

== Publications ==
- Dare Call It Treason: The True Story of the French Army Mutinies of 1917. Chatto & Windus. 1963. ISBN 978-0-671-19030-9.
- The Kings Depart: The Tragedy of Germany: Versailles and the German Revolution. New York: Simon & Schuster. 1968. LCCN 68022973. OCLC 1150127832.
- Bitter Glory: Poland and Its Fate, 1918–1939. New York: Simon & Schuster. 1979.
