= Leif Rantala =

Finnish-Swedish linguist (1947–2015)

- Born: 26 December 1947; Liljendal, Finland
- Died: 8 January 2015 (aged 67); Rovaniemi, Finland
- Occupation: Linguist

Leif Rantala (26 December 1947, Liljendal – 8 January 2015, Rovaniemi) was a Finnish-Swedish linguist, and a specialist of Sami languages, cultures of history, especially of the Kola Peninsula.

Valentina Sovkina characterized Rantala in Facebook with the following words: “He left a large, radiant footprint in the lives of the Sami people, with his interest in and knowledge of the Skolt Sami and the Sami of the Kola Peninsula.”

== Activities in science and society ==
Rantala graduated from Helsinki University with a MA degree in Finno-Ugric languages in 1975. His thesis dealt with the Saami place names in Polmak. He worked at the University of Lapland in Rovaniemi, mainly as a teacher of the Northern Saami language. He was an expert of the Saami peoples and cultures of Pechenga and the Kola Peninsula. He collected a sizable collection of ethnographic materials from the Saami of Russia.

Rantala often had to work as a translator, when the civil servants in Finnish Lapland did not know Saami. “I have sometimes had to translate texts, when people have complained about the non-existent command of Saami of e.g. the police. How many Finnish civil servants have taken the trouble to learn Saami? I don’t think there are too many of them.” According to Rantala, society should use various perks to motivate civil servants to learn Saami.

== Works ==
- Sámi bibliografiia: čállosat Suomas 1986/Saamelaisbibliografia: Suomessa julkaistun saamelaisaineiston vuosiluettelo 1986 [Bibliography of Saami literature in Finland in 1986]. Rovaniemi: Rovaniemi public library and Lapland Provincial library. 1988. p. [6], 10, [6].
- Rantala, Leif (1988). Sámegiel báikenammalogahallan/Samisk ortnamnsförteckning/Samisk stedsnavnsfortegnelse/Saamenkielinen paikannimiluettelo/Ukazatel' saamskih toponimov [An index of Saami place names]. Roavvenjárga. p. 40, [2]. ISBN 952-90-0133-9.
- Dokument om de ryska samerna och Kolahalvön [Documents on the Russian Saami and on the Kola Peninsula]. Rovaniemi: University of Lapland. 2006. p. 156. ISBN 952-484-022-7. Ed. Leif Rantala. University of Lapland, reports on pedagogy, 1457-9553; 15.
- Kuolan niemimaalla käyneiden suomalaisten tiedemiesten matkakertomuksia [Travel accounts of Finns who had been to the Kola Peninsula] (PDF). Rovaniemi: Lapin tutkimusseura. 2008. p. 116. ISBN 978-951-9327-50-1. Collected and translated by Leif Rantala. Archived from the original (PDF) on 2015-01-09.
- Leif Rantala & Aleftina Sergina (2009). Áhkkila sápmelaččat: oanehis muitalus sámejoavkku birra, man maŋimuš sámegielalaš olmmoš jámii 29.12.2003. Rovaniemi. p. 79. ISBN 978-952-484-328-7. University of Lapland, reports on pedagogy, 1796-3877; 8.
- Kuolaan: Venäjän vallan aikana Kuolan niemimaalla käyneet suomalaiset tiedemiehet ja heidän kirjoituksensa/Suopmelaš dieðaolbmot geat gallededje Guoládatnjárgga n.g. ruošša áigge ja sin čállosat j.n.a./Articles and books concerning the Finnish scientific fieldwork on the Kola Peninsula from 1820 until 1917/Finska vetenskapsmän som besökt Kolahalvön under den s.k. ryska tiden i Finland och deras artiklar, böcker m.m./Finskie učenye, poseŝavšie Kol'skij poluostrov v period velikogo knâžestva finlândskogo (1809–1917) i ih publikacii [To Kola]. Rovaniemi. 1. painos 2008, 2 painos 2010: University of Lapland. 2008. ISBN 978-952-484-181-8. Introduction and presentation also in Saami, Swedish, English and Russian.

== Translations ==
- Organization for Security and Co-operation in Europe, Helsinki Final Act (1975)./Europa dorvvolaśvuoda ja oktasaśbarggu konfereansa: loahppaáśśigirji. Helsset/Helsinki: Davviriikkaid sámiráddi (Nordic Saami Council). 1979. p. 76. ISBN 951-95329-8-6. Saami translation: Leif Rantala, Pekka Sammallahti.
- Etu-Lapin suomalaisasutus [Finnish settlement of Lower Lapland. A Nordic travelling exhibition. Produced by the Lapland Provincial Museum, Rovaniemi]. Rovaniemi: Lapland Provincial Museum. 1986. p. [2], 23. ISBN 951-99773-0-9. Swedish translations by Markku Ekholm, Saami translations by Leif Rantala.
- Jukka Peltonen (1988). Sámi jietna: sámi čáppagirjjálašvuohta: bibliografiia/Saamen ääni: saamelainen kaunokirjallisuus ja sen tutkimus: bibliografia [The Voice of the Saami: Saami literature and research on it: a bibliography]. Rovaniemi: Rovaniemi public library and Lapland Provincial library. p. 58. Translations by Leif Rantala.
- Ludger Müller-Wille (1996). Sápmelaččat Ohcejogas Sámis: eallinmállet 1960-logu loahpageahčen/Sámi in Ohcejohka, Sápmi: modes of life in the late 1960's/Saamelaiset Utsjoella Saamenmaassa: 1960-luvun lopun elämää. Rovaniemi: Arktinen keskus/Arctic centre. ISBN 951-634-482-8. Translation into Sámi: Leif Rantala; translation into Finnish: Lilja Seppälä, Kaisa Uitto and Leena Tornberg.
- Sünne Burmeister, Nils-Aslak Valkeapää (1997). Between the times: portrait of a Sámi reindeer herder/Áiggiid gaskkas:sápmelaš badjeolbmá govva/Aikain välillä: saamelaisen poromiehen muotokuva. Rovaniemi: Arktinen keskus/Arctic centre, University of Lapland. p. 75. ISBN 951-634-537-9. Exhibit catalogue and text/Čájáhuskataloga ja deaksta/näyttelyluettelo ja teksti: Sünne Burmeister; all poems: Nils-Aslak Valkeapää; translation into Sámi: Leif Rantala; translation into Finnish Hanna Ahoniemi, Pirita Oksanen; translation of N-A. Valkeapää’s poems: Jyri Tynkkynen.
- P. W. Aurén (2012). Matkani Lapinmaassa 1867: Inari, Utsjoki, Sodankylä, Jäämeren ranta [My travels in Lapland in 1867]. Tuusula: Hipputeos. p. 176. ISBN 978-952-5617-21-4. Translated by Leif Rantala.
- Pigga Keskitalo (2011). Sámi pedagogihka iešvuođat/Saamelaispedagogiikan perusteet/The basics of Sámi pedagogy/Grunderna i samisk pedagogik/Osnovy saamskoj pedagogiki. Rovaniemi: University of Lapland. ISBN 978-952-484-503-8. Swedish translation: Leif Rantala. Based on Pigga Keskitalo’s dissertation at the University of Lapland (2010): Saamelaiskoulun kulttuurisensitiivisyyttä etsimässä kasvatusantropologian keinoin ja hänen jälkeenpäin yhdessä Kaarina Määtän kanssa pedagogisille malleille.

== Work edited ==
- Cherniakov, Z. E. (1998). Očerki ètnografii saamov / Essays on Saami ethnography. Rovaniemi: University of Lapland. p. 110, [14]. ISBN 951-634-601-4. Pod redakciej Lejfa Rantala; edited by Leif Rantala. English summary.
