= Pello Iguaran =

Spanish footballer (1940-2015)

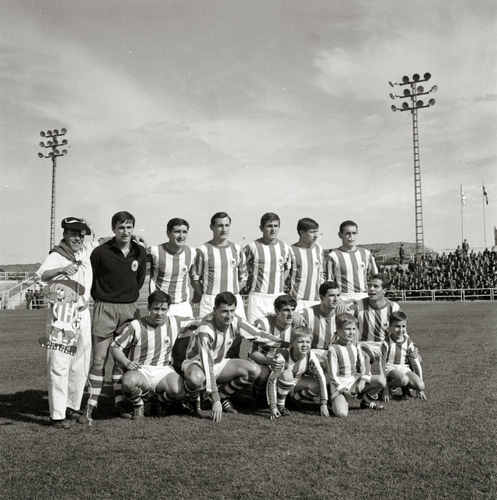

Personal information
- Full name: Pedro María Iguaran Arandia
- Date of birth: 2 July 1940
- Place of birth: Lasarte-Oria, Spain
- Date of death: 16 January 2015 (aged 74)
- Position: Defender

Senior career*
Years	Team	Apps	(Gls)
1963–1964	Deportivo Alavés	24	(0)
1964–1971	Real Sociedad	64	(0)
1971–1972	Deportivo Alavés		
- * Club domestic league appearances and goals

Pedro María "Pello" Iguaran Arandia (2 July 1940 – 16 January 2015) was a Spanish football defender.

Iguaran played for Deportivo Alavés in the 1963-1964 season. He signed for Real Sociedad immediately after Alavés was relegated. Iguaran served his new club for 7 years, being in most cases used as a reserve defender. However, he was in the starting 11 that obtained promotion in the historical 1967 match against Calvo Sotelo. He played a total of 85 games for Real Sociedad.
