= Don O'Hearn =

Canadian ice hockey player

- Born: February 14, 1928; Halifax, Nova Scotia, Canada
- Died: January 25, 2015 (aged 86); St. Catharines, Ontario, Canada
- Height: 5 ft 11 in (180 cm)
- Weight: 170 lb (77 kg; 12 st 2 lb)
- Position: Goaltender
- Shot: Left
- Played for: Fort Worth Rangers; Springfield Indians; Fresno Falcons; Springfield Indians; Oakland Oaks; New Haven Eagles; Vancouver Canucks; Syracuse Warriors; Baltimore Clippers; Philadelphia Ramblers; Greensboro Generals; Fort Wayne Komets; Muskegon Zephyrs; Indianapolis Chiefs
- Playing career: 1942–1964

Donald "Nipper" O'Hearn (February 14, 1928 – January 25, 2015) was a Canadian professional ice hockey goaltender who played over 200 games combined in the Pacific Coast Hockey League, United States Hockey League, American Hockey League, Maritime Major Hockey League, Quebec Hockey League, International Hockey League, and Eastern Hockey League. He was born in Halifax, Nova Scotia but grew up in St. Catharines, Ontario. He died after a long illness in a hospital at St. Catharines in 2015.
