= George H. McKee =

United States Air Force general

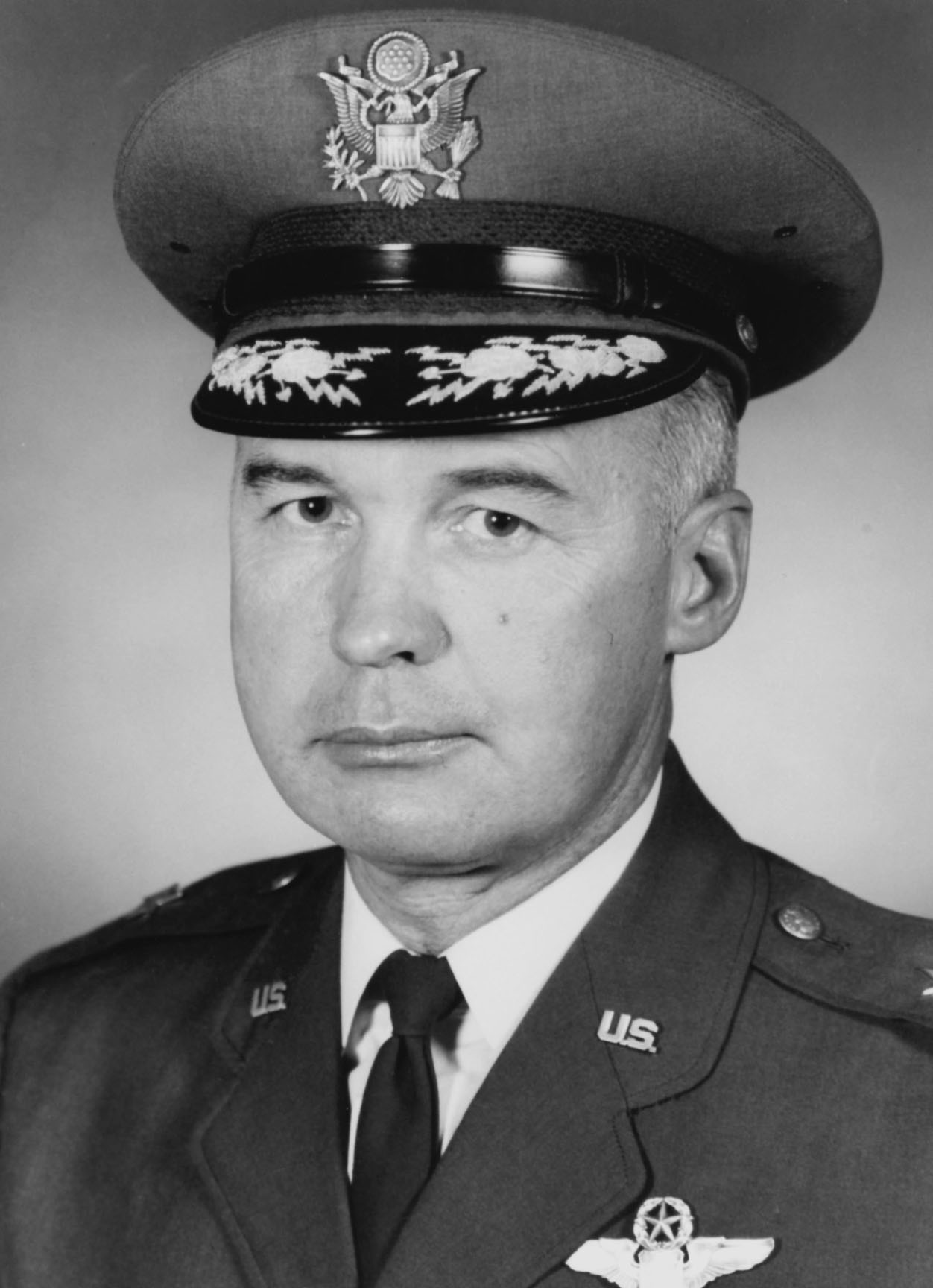
- Born: April 28, 1923; Pickens, South Carolina
- Died: January 6, 2015 (aged 91); Potomac Falls, Virginia
- Burial place: Arlington National Cemetery
- Military career
- Allegiance: United States of America
- Branch: United States Air Force
- Service years: 1942–1975
- Rank: Lieutenant General
- Awards: Air Force Distinguished Service Medal with oak leaf cluster, Legion of Merit with oak leaf cluster, Distinguished Flying Cross, and Air Medal with four oak leaf clusters

Lieutenant General George H. McKee (April 28, 1923 – January 6, 2015) was an American Air Force lieutenant general and command pilot who was commander of Air Training Command with headquarters at Randolph Air Force Base, Texas.

== Biography ==
McKee was born in 1923, in Pickens, South Carolina. He enlisted in the United States Army Air Corps at MacDill Field, Florida, in December 1940 and was subsequently assigned to Chanute Field, Ill., where he was an aircraft mechanic instructor for the next two years. He was accepted for aviation cadet training in December 1942 and graduated as a pilot in September 1943 with a commission as a second lieutenant. For the next few months, he attended B-17 transition and combat crew training.

In March 1944 he was assigned to the 569th Bombardment Squadron, Eighth Air Force, in the European Theater of Operations where he flew 35 combat missions.

McKee was transferred in October 1944 to MacDill Field where he was a B-17 and B-29 instructor pilot. He was integrated into the Regular Air Force in October 1947. At this time, he was assigned to the 49th Bombardment Squadron, 2d Bombardment Group, Davis-Monthan Air Force Base, Ariz., where he served as aircraft commander on B-29 and B-50 aircraft. He transferred to Hunter Air Force Base, Georgia, in April 1949 with the 2d Bombardment Group.

In November 1951 he became the 49th Bombardment Squadron operations officer and in June 1953 was appointed commander. During this period, the squadron converted from B-50 to B-47 aircraft. He served as chief of maintenance, 2nd Bombardment Wing, from June 1955 to October 1955.

From October 1955 to June 1960, he was assigned to the Control Division, Directorate of Operations, Headquarters Strategic Air Command, where he was project officer for development of the SAC Command and Control System.

He received a Bachelor of Arts degree in education from the University of Omaha in 1958.

In August 1960 he was assigned as vice commander, 3974th Combat Support Group, Zaragoza Air Base, Spain, and in May 1962, became commander of the group.

After attending the Industrial College of the Armed Forces during 1963–1964, he underwent B-52 aircraft transition training at Castle Air Force Base, Calif. In October 1964 he was assigned as deputy commander for maintenance, 97th Bombardment Wing, Blytheville Air Force Base, Ark. In April 1965 he was transferred to Grand Forks Air Force Base, N.D., to assume command of the 319th Bombardment Wing. In June 1966 he returned to Blytheville Air Force Base as commander of the 97th Bombardment Wing. In July 1967 he transferred to Ramey Air Force Base, Puerto Rico, as commander of the 72d Bombardment Wing.

In July 1968 he received an assignment as commander of the 19th Air Division, Carswell Air Force Base, Texas.

In June 1970 McKee was assigned as director of maintenance engineering in the Office of Deputy Chief of Staff, Systems and Logistics, Headquarters U.S. Air Force, Washington, D.C.

McKee assumed duties as deputy chief of staff for logistics, Headquarters Strategic Air Command, Offutt Air Force Base, Neb., in October 1972. In this position, he was responsible for aircraft and missile maintenance, procurement, supply and services, transportation, munitions, logistics plans, and logistics analysis throughout Strategic Air Command. He became SAC chief of staff in April 1973. In this position, he was responsible for headquarters staff supervision and for monitoring the implementation of the decisions and policies of the commander in chief.

On October 1, 1973, McKee assumed command of Eighth Air Force with responsibilities for SAC operations in the Western Pacific and Southeast Asia areas.

McKee became commander of the Air Training Command with headquarters at Randolph Air Force Base, Texas, in September 1974.

His military decorations and awards include the Air Force Distinguished Service Medal with oak leaf cluster, Legion of Merit with oak leaf cluster, Distinguished Flying Cross, and Air Medal with four oak leaf clusters. A command pilot, McKee has more than 8,000 flying hours to his credit. He has flown numerous types of aircraft but most of his flying time is in B-17, B-29, B-50, B-47, B-52 and KC-135 aircraft.

His hometown is Lakeland, Florida. McKee was promoted to the grade of lieutenant general effective October 1, 1973, with date of rank September 29, 1973. He died on January 6, 2015, aged 91.
