= Senan Louis O'Donnell =

Irish bishop (1927–2023)

His Excellency Senan Louis O'Donnell
- Bishop Emeritus of Maiduguri
- Diocese: Jos
- Appointed: 18 September 1993
- Term ended: 28 February 2003
- Predecessor: James Timothy Kieran Cotter
- Successor: Matthew Man-oso Ndagoso

Orders
- Ordination: 17 July 1955
- Consecration: 28 November 1993 by Patrick Francis Sheehan

Personal details
- Born: 24 February 1927 Inis Cathaigh, Ireland
- Died: 12 April 2023 (aged 96) Dún Laoghaire, Ireland

Senan Louis O'Donnell, OSA (24 February 1927 – 12 April 2023) was an Irish Catholic prelate who was Bishop of Maiduguri, Nigeria.

== Orders ==
O'Donnell was ordained a priest of the Order of Saint Augustine on 17 July 1955 and subsequently consecrated as Bishop of Maiduguri, Nigeria on 28 November 1993 by Bishop Patrick Francis Sheehan and retired from that role on 28 February 2003.

Catholic Church titles
Preceded by James Timothy Kieran Cotter	Bishop of Maiduguri; 1993–2003	Succeeded by Matthew Man-oso Ndagoso
