= Kyustendil =

Kyustendil Кюстендил
- Town
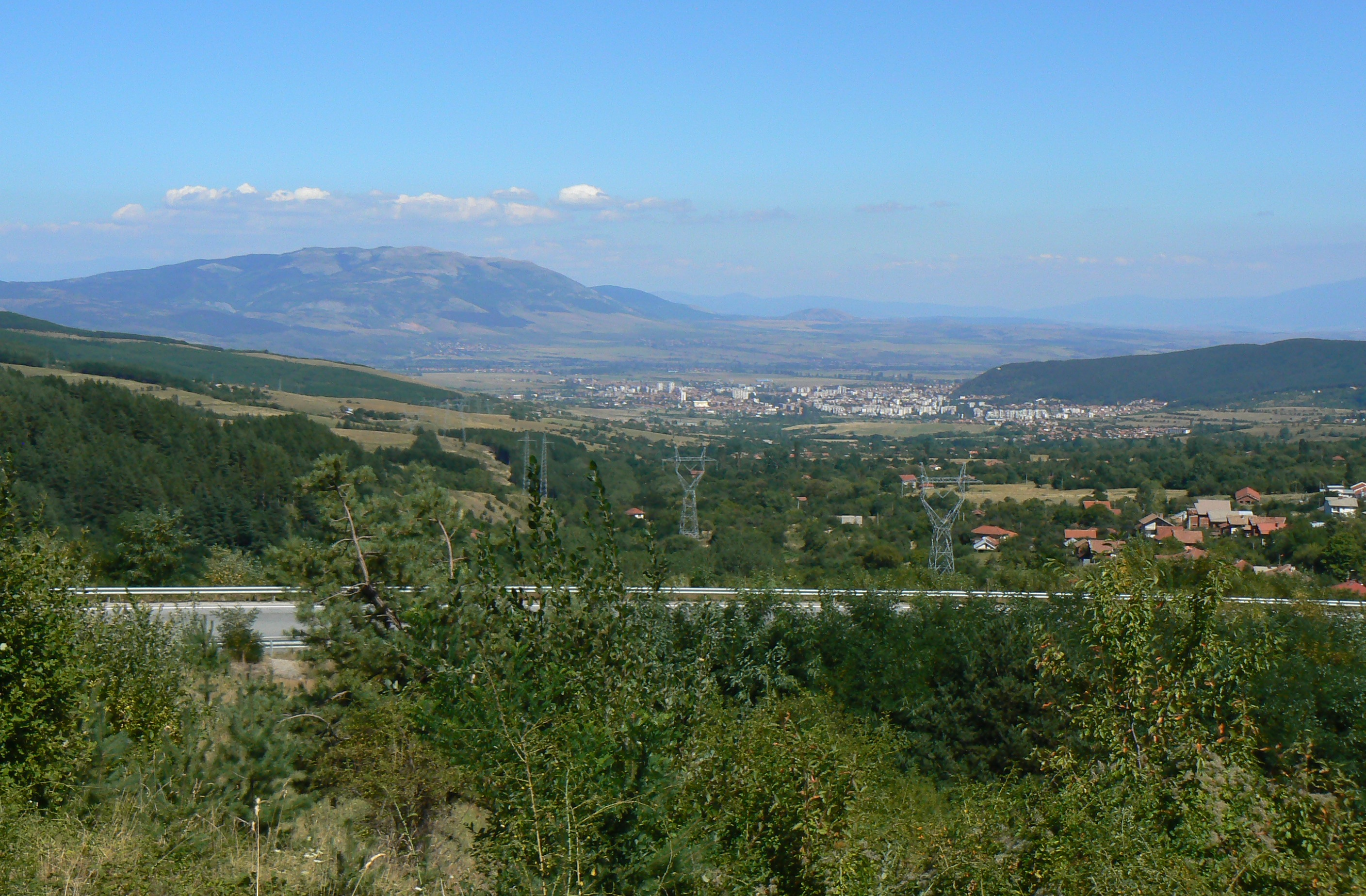

- Flag Coat of arms

- Location of Kyustendil
- Coordinates: 42°17′N 22°41′E
- Country: Bulgaria
- Province (Oblast): Kyustendil

Government
  - Mayor: Ognyan Atanasov

Area
  - Town: 28.72 km^{2} (11.09 sq mi)
  - Urban: 979.91 km^{2} (378.35 sq mi)
- Elevation: 560 m (1,840 ft)

Population (2024)
  - Town: 46 856
  - Density: 2,329/km^{2} (6,030/sq mi)
  - Urban: 61,642
- Time zone: UTC+2 (EET)
  - Summer (DST): UTC+3 (EEST)
- Postal Code: 2500
- Area code: 078
- Vehicle registration: KH

Kyustendil (Bulgarian: Кюстендил [kʲustenˈdiɫ]) is a town in the far west of Bulgaria, the capital of the Kyustendil Province, a former bishopric and present Latin Catholic titular see.

The town is situated in the southern part of the Kyustendil Valley, near the borders of Serbia and North Macedonia; 90 km southwest of Sofia, 130 km northeast of Skopje and 243 km north of Thessaloniki. The population is 37 799, with a Bulgarian majority and a Roma minority. During the Iron Age, a Thracian settlement was located within the town, later known as Roman in the 1st century AD. In the Middle Ages, the town switched hands between the Byzantine Empire, Bulgaria and Serbia, prior to Ottoman annexation in 1395. After centuries of Ottoman rule, the town became part of an independent Bulgarian state in 1878.

== Names ==
The modern name is derived from Kösten, the Turkified name of the 14th-century Serbian magnate Constantine Dragaš, from Latin constans, "steadfast" + the Turkish il "shire, county" or "bath/spa". The town was known as Pautalia (Greek: Παυταλία) in Antiquity and as Velbazhd (Latin Velebusdus; Medieval Greek: Βελέβουσδα, romanized: Belébousda; Bulgarian: Велбъжд; Serbian: Велбужд) in the Middle Ages.

=== Eponymy ===
Kyustendil Ridge in Graham Land, Antarctica is named after the city, and Pautalia Glacier on Livingston Island in the South Shetland Islands, Antarctica is named after Pautalia (its Thracian ancestor settlement).

== History ==
=== Prehistory and Roman era ===
A Thracian settlement was founded at the place of the modern town in the 5th-4th centuries BC and was known for its asclepion, a shrine dedicated to medicine god Asclepius.

Under the name Pautalia (Ancient Greek: Παυταλία or Πανταλία) it was a town in the district of Dentheletica. Its position in the Peutinger Table places Pautalia at Kyustendil; and the situation of this town at the sources of the Strymon agrees remarkably with the figure of a river-god, accompanied by the "legend" Στρύμων ("Strymon"), on some of the autonomous coins of Pautalia, as well as with the letters ΕΝ. ΠΑΙΩ. ("En. Paio"), which, on other coins, show that the inhabitants considered themselves to be Paeonians, like the other inhabitants of the banks of that river. On another coin of Pautalia, the productions of its territory are alluded to, namely, gold, silver, wine, and corn. In the reign of Hadrian, the people both of Pautalia and Serdica added Ulpia to the name of their town, probably in consequence of some benefit received from that emperor. Stephanus of Byzantium has a district called Paetalia (Παιταλία), which he assigns to Thrace, probably a false reading.

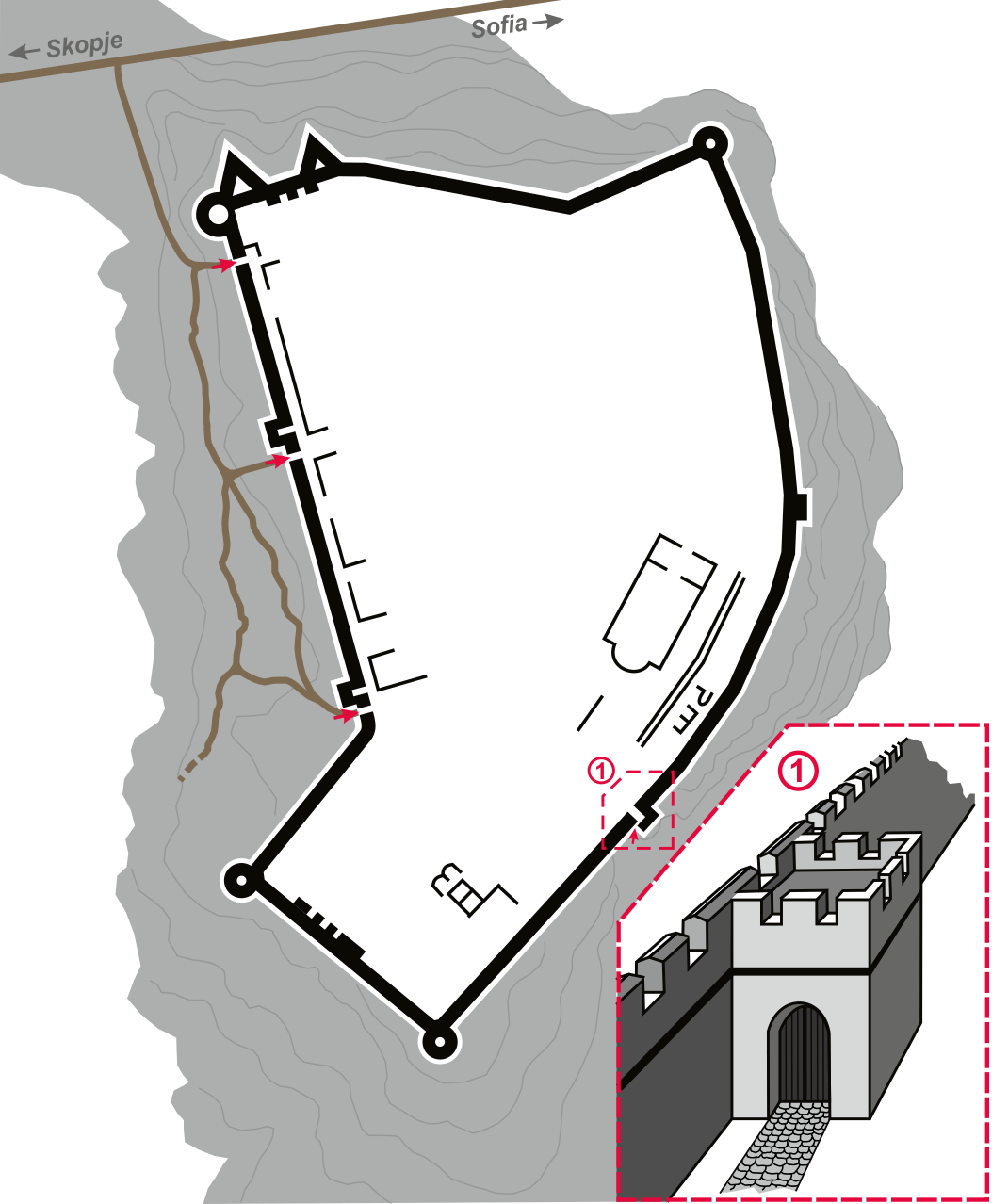
Plan of the fortress Velbazhd

In the 1st century AD, it was administratively part of Macedonia. Later the city was part of the province of Dacia Mediterranea and the third largest city in the province.

The Roman fortress of Pautalia of the 2nd to 4th century had an area of over 29 hectares (appr. 72 acres). The fortress wall was built mainly of granite blocks and unusually its façade was supported with pillars and arches behind. The wall was 2.5m wide allowing small catapults to be mounted atop.

A second, smaller fortress of area 2 hectares was built in the town in the 4th century (known by its later Ottoman name Hisarlaka).

Many Thracian and Roman objects are exhibited in the town's Regional History Museum, most notably an impressive numismatic collection.

Recent excavations have revealed an early Christian, late Roman monumental bishop's palace.

=== Middle Ages ===
The town was mentioned under the Slavic name of Velbazhd (Велбъжд, meaning "camel") in a 1019 charter by the Byzantine Emperor Basil II. It became a major religious and administrative centre of the Byzantine Empire, and subsequently the Second Bulgarian Empire after Kaloyan conquered the area between 1201 and 1203.

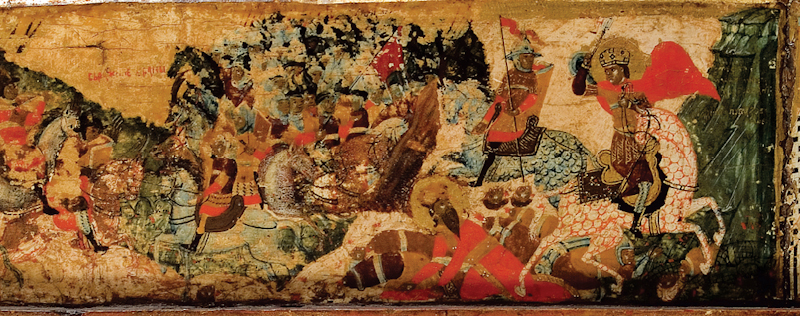
Battle of Velbazhd, a fresco in the Visoki Dečani

In 1282, Serbian king Stefan Milutin defeated the Byzantine Empire and conquered Velbazhd.

In 1330, the Serbs defeated the Bulgarians in the vicinity, effectively keeping the region to the Serbian Kingdom. Serbian magnate Dejan, one of the prominent figures of the Serbian Empire and its subsequent fall, had initially held a large province in the Kumanovo region under Dušan, and was later as despot under Uroš V assigned the Upper Struma river with Velbuzhd. Upon Dejan's death, his possessions in Žegligovo and Upper Struma were given to his two sons, Jovan Dragaš (d. 1378) and Konstantin (d. 1395). The Dejanović brothers ruled a spacious province in eastern Macedonia, in the southern lands of the Empire, and remained loyal to Uroš V, until 1373, when Orhan Gazi's Ottoman army compelled Jovan to recognize Ottoman vassalage.

=== Ottoman era ===
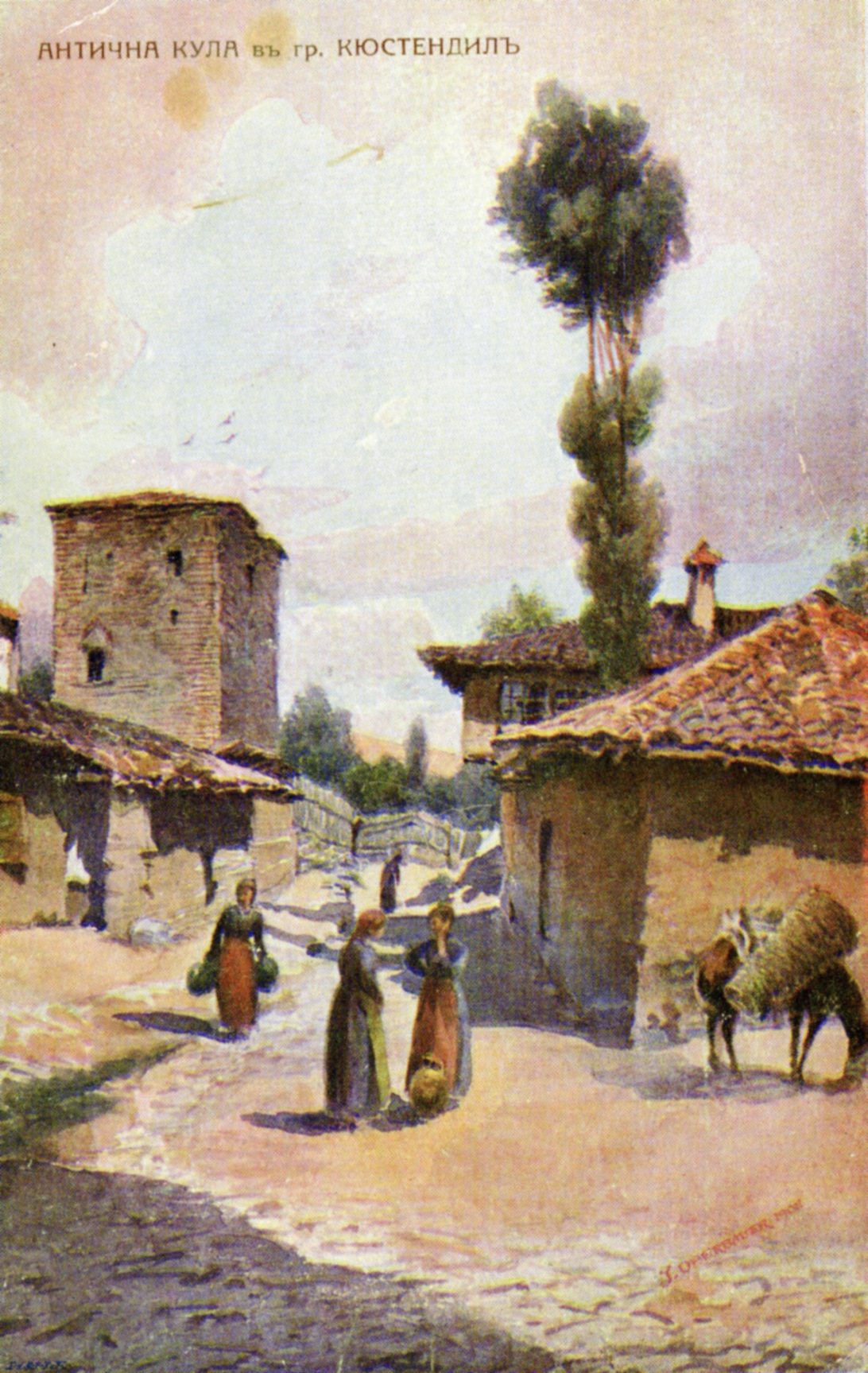
Pyrgos Tower 1908 (by Joseph Oberbauer)

The city was a sanjak centre initially in Rumelia governorate-general, after that in the Bitola and Niš vilayets (province). It was a kaza centre in the Sofia sanjak of Danube Province until the creation of the Principality of Bulgaria in 1878.

=== Modern ===
The residents of Kyustendil took an active part in the Bulgarian National Revival and crafts and trade flourished. The town was liberated from Ottoman rule on 29 January 1878.

== Demographics ==
According to the 2024 census, the population of Kyustendil is 46,856 people.

=== Ethnic linguistic and religious composition ===
According to the 2011 census data, people who chose to declare their ethnic identity were distributed as follows:

- Bulgarians: 36,732 (82.5%)
- Roma: 5,179 (11.6%)
- Turks: 2 (0.0%)
- Others: 143 (0.3%)
- Indefinable: 296 (0.7%)
  - Undeclared: 2,161 (4.9%)

Total: 44,513

Roma people are mainly concentrated within the town limits. In the meantime, about a fourth of Bulgarians live in the surrounding villages, also part of the Municipality of Kyustendil.

=== Religion ===
Kyustendil today belongs to the Sofia diocese in regards of Orthodox church-administrative structure. The city is the center of the vicarage and the Kyustendil Eparchy; in the past, Kyustendil was the seat of the diocese, that latter was closed in 1884. The majority of the urban population profess the Orthodox faith today.

There are several Christian denominations associated with Protestantism and a small Jewish community. During Ottoman rule Kyustendil had a population mostly professing Islam, but of the many mosques of the time, now only two remain. Today the city has only Christian churches operating.

In Antiquity, Pautalia was a bishopric in the Roman province of Dacia Mediterranea, suffragan to the Metropolitan Archdiocese of Sardica, in the sway of the Patriarchate of Constantinople. Its only recorded residential bishop was

- Evangelius, who was summoned to Constantinople by Byzantine emperor Anastasius I Dicorus in 516 during the controversy against Monophysitism.

During the brief Late Medieval period, when the Bulgarian Church entered in full communion with Rome (instead of Orthodox Constantinople), one of its three 'Uniate Catholic' (equivalent to modern Eastern Catholic) sees was Velebusdus, which was even raised to a Metropolitan Latin Archbishopric as Pope Innocent III sent its incumbent Athanasius the archiepiscopal pallium on 25 February 1204.

=== Latin titular see ===
The archdiocese was nominally restored in 1933 as Latin Metropolitan titular archbishopric of Velebusdus (Latin) / Velebusdo (Curiate Italian) / Velesdien(sis) (Latin adjective).

It has had the following incumbents, so far of the fitting Metropolitan (highest; perhaps some merely of intermediary Archiepiscopal) rank :

- Ferdinand Stanislaus Pawlikowski (1953.12.07 – death 1956.07.31) as emeritate and promotion; formerly Titular Bishop of Dadima (1927.02.25 – 1927.04.26) as Auxiliary Bishop of Diocese of Seckau (Austria) (1927.02.25 – 1927.04.26), succeeded as Bishop of Seckau (1927.04.26 – 1953.12.07)
- Aston Sebastian Joseph Chichester, Jesuit Order (S.J.) (1956.11.23 – death 1962.10.24) as emeritate, formerly Titular Bishop of Ubaza (1931.03.04 – 1955.01.01) as only Apostolic Vicar of Salisbury (then in (Southern) Rhodesia, now in Zimbabwe) (1931.03.04 – 1955.01.01) promoted as first Metropolitan Archbishop of Salisbury (now Harare, Zimbabwe) (1955.01.01 – 1956.11.23)
- Antônio de Almeida Lustosa, Salesians (S.D.B.) (1963.02.16 – resigned 1971.03.16) as emeritate, formerly Bishop of Uberaba (Brazil) (1924.07.04 – 1928.12.17), Bishop of Corumbá (Brazil) (1928.12.17 – 1931.07.10), Metropolitan Archbishop of Belém do Pará (Brazil) (1931.07.10 – 1941.07.19), Metropolitan Archbishop of Fortaleza (Brazil) (1941.07.19 – 1963.02.16); died 1976
- Eugène Klein, Sacred Heart Missionaries (M.S.C.) (1971.06.05 – 1972.04.07) as Coadjutor Archbishop of Nouméa (New Caledonia) (1971.06.05 – 1972.04.07), succeeding as Metropolitan Archbishop of Nouméa (1972.04.07 – 1981); previously Titular Bishop of Echinus (1960.06.14 – 1966.11.15) as Apostolic Vicar of Yule Island (Papua New Guinea) (1960.06.14 – 1966.11.15), then Bishop of Bereina (Papua New Guinea) (1966.11.15 – retired 1971.06.05), died 1992
- Peter Yariyok Jatau (1972.06.26 – 1975.04.10) as Coadjutor Archbishop of Kaduna (Nigeria) (1972.06.26 – 1975.04.10), next succeeded as Metropolitan Archbishop of Kaduna (1975.04.10 – retired 2007.11.16)
- Enzio d'Antonio (1979.06.24 – 1982.05.13) as intermezzo : previously Archbishop-Bishop of Trivento (Italy) (1975.03.18 – 1977), Coadjutor Archbishop of Boiano–Campobasso (Italy) (1975.03.18 – 1977.01.31) succeeding as Metropolitan Archbishop of Boiano-Campobasso (1977.01.31 – 1979.06.24); later last Archbishop of Lanciano (Italy) (1982.05.13 – 1986.09.30), restyled first Archbishop of Lanciano–Ortona (Italy) (1986.09.30 – retired 2000.11.25)
- José Manuel Estepa Llaurens (1983.07.30 – 1989.11.18) first as Archbishop Military Vicar of Spain (Spain) (1983.07.30 – 1986.07.21), restyled Archbishop Military Ordinary of Spain (1986.07.21 – retired 2003.10.30); later Titular Archbishop of Italica (1989.11.18 – 1998.03.07), created Cardinal-Priest of San Gabriele Arcangelo all'Acqua Traversa (2010.11.20 [2011.04.29] – ...); previously Titular Bishop of Tisili (1972.09.05 – 1983.07.30) as Auxiliary Bishop of Madrid (Spain) (1972.09.05 – 1983.07.30)
- Archbishop Gábor Pintér (2016.05.13 – ...), papal diplomat : Apostolic Nuncio to Belarus, no previous prelature.

== Economy ==
The city is the center of light and manufacturing industry: logging, footwear, knitwear, ready-made clothes, toys, packaging, alcohol producers, bakery, printing and canning industries. There are companies for the production of condensers, power transformers, household and kitchen furniture and joinery. Hotels and tourism have evolved in recent years. The region has traditions in fruit growing and trade in fresh and dried fruits.

Kyustendil is a center of an agricultural area with centuries-old traditions in the field of fruit growing, which is why the town and its surroundings are known as the "Orchard Garden of Bulgaria".

== Geography ==
Kyustendil is a national balneological resort at an altitude of 600 metres. There are more than 40 mineral springs in the town. The waters have a high content of sulfite compounds. These are used for the treatment of the locomotory system, gynecological and other kinds of diseases. The resort region includes several baths, balneological complexes and others.

Kyustendil is located at the foot of the Osogovo mountain, on both banks of the Banshtica River and is a well-known centre of balneology and fruit growing. The town is 90 kilometres southwest of Sofia, 69 km northwest of Blagoevgrad and 22 km from the border with North Macedonia and Serbia. The fortress was built by the Romans. Thermae, basilicas, floor mosaics have been uncovered.

=== Climate ===
Kyustendil has a temperate climate with Mediterranean and continental influences (the nearby Struma River moderating extremes). The average annual temperature is approximately 10 °C (50 °F). The highest mean temperatures occur in July and August at about 20.4 °C and 20.7 °C (69 – 69 °F), respectively, while the coldest month is January with a mean near –1.0 °C (30 °F). The annual temperature range is therefore around 21.7 °C (39 °F). Summers remain warm and relatively long, and winters are shorter and cooler, with spring settling in by early March and autumn extending warmly into late November .Annual precipitation averages about 726 mm (28.6 in), spread over roughly 90 days with ≥ 1 mm of rainfall. Snowfall data are not systematically recorded in monthly normals, but historical records indicate an average of 10–12 snow days each winter ([Wikipedia][2]). Sunshine totals near 1 130 hours per year, with the sunniest period in late summer and early autumn and the cloudiest in winter .Relative humidity hovers around 65–70 % overall, dipping lowest in the summer months (especially August). Wind speeds are modest, averaging 1.4 m/s (4.6 ft/s) annually, with spring as the windiest season and autumn the calmest. Occasional “foehn” gusts in winter and spring can cause rapid temperature rises.Temperature extremes remain notable: the record low of –22.4 °C (–8.3 °F) was observed on 20 January 1967, and the highest 43.2 °C (110 °F) on 24 July 2007.

Climate data for Kyustendil, Bulgaria
Month	Jan	Feb	Mar	Apr	May	Jun	Jul	Aug	Sep	Oct	Nov	Dec	Year
Mean daily maximum °C (°F)	3.3 (37.9)	5.4 (41.7)	9.5 (49.1)	14.4 (57.9)	18.8 (65.8)	22.6 (72.7)	25.1 (77.2)	25.6 (78.1)	20.7 (69.3)	15.6 (60.1)	10.2 (50.4)	4.8 (40.6)	25.6 (78.1)
Daily mean °C (°F)	−1.0 (30.2)	0.9 (33.6)	4.8 (40.6)	9.5 (49.1)	14.3 (57.7)	18 (64)	20.4 (68.7)	20.7 (69.3)	15.9 (60.6)	10.7 (51.3)	5.5 (41.9)	0.7 (33.3)	9.0 (48.2)
Mean daily minimum °C (°F)	−4.8 (23.4)	−3.2 (26.2)	0 (32)	4.1 (39.4)	8.8 (47.8)	12.6 (54.7)	14.9 (58.8)	15.2 (59.4)	11.0 (51.8)	5.9 (42.6)	1.5 (34.7)	−2.7 (27.1)	−4.8 (23.4)
Average precipitation mm (inches)	50 (2.0)	49 (1.9)	63 (2.5)	73 (2.9)	79 (3.1)	75 (3.0)	58 (2.3)	46 (1.8)	49 (1.9)	58 (2.3)	55 (2.2)	65 (2.6)	726 (28.6)
Average precipitation days (≥ 0.1 mm)	6	6	8	9	10	9	7	6	6	6	6	8	90
Average snowy days (≥ 0.1 cm)	4	3	0	0	0	0	0	0	0	0	1	3	11
Mean monthly sunshine hours	162	168	232.5	282	328.6	348	368.9	312	279	210	186	164	1,131
Source: Climate-Data.org

Kyustendil

Climate chart (precipitation, max. and min. temperature)
J	F	M	A	M	J	J	A	S	O	N	D
48 6 −4	45 9 −3	42 14 3	52 20 7	68 24 11	65 28 14	34 32 16	36 32 16	38 26 12	59 20 8	62 14 3	65 7 −2
- █ Average max. and min. temperatures in °C
- █ Precipitation totals in mm
Imperial conversion
J	F	M	A	M	J	J	A	S	O	N	D
1.9 43 25	1.8 48 27	1.7 57 37	2 68 45	2.7 75 51	2.6 82 56	1.3 89 60	1.4 89 60	1.5 78 54	2.3 67 46	2.4 57 37	2.6 44 28
- █ Average max. and min. temperatures in °F
- █ Precipitation totals in inches

== Notable people ==
- Theodore Ushev, animator, film director, screenwriter
- Constantine Dragaš, 14th-century local Serbian ruler
- Ilyo Voyvoda (1805–1898), hajduk, revolutionary and Bulgarian liberation fighter (died in Kyustendil)
- Vladimir Dimitrov (1882–1960), painter
- Dimitar Peshev (1894–1973), World War II Minister of Justice and Deputy speaker of the Parliament who prevented the deportation of the Bulgarian Jews to Nazi death camps
- Todor Angelov (1900–1943), communist revolutionary and Belgian resistance fighter
- Nikolay Diulgheroff (1901–1982), futurist artist
- Marin Goleminov (1908–2000), composer
- Irina Taseva (1910–1990), actress
- Venelin Venev (1973- ), Director of the Bulgarian Defense Intelligence Service

== Gallery ==
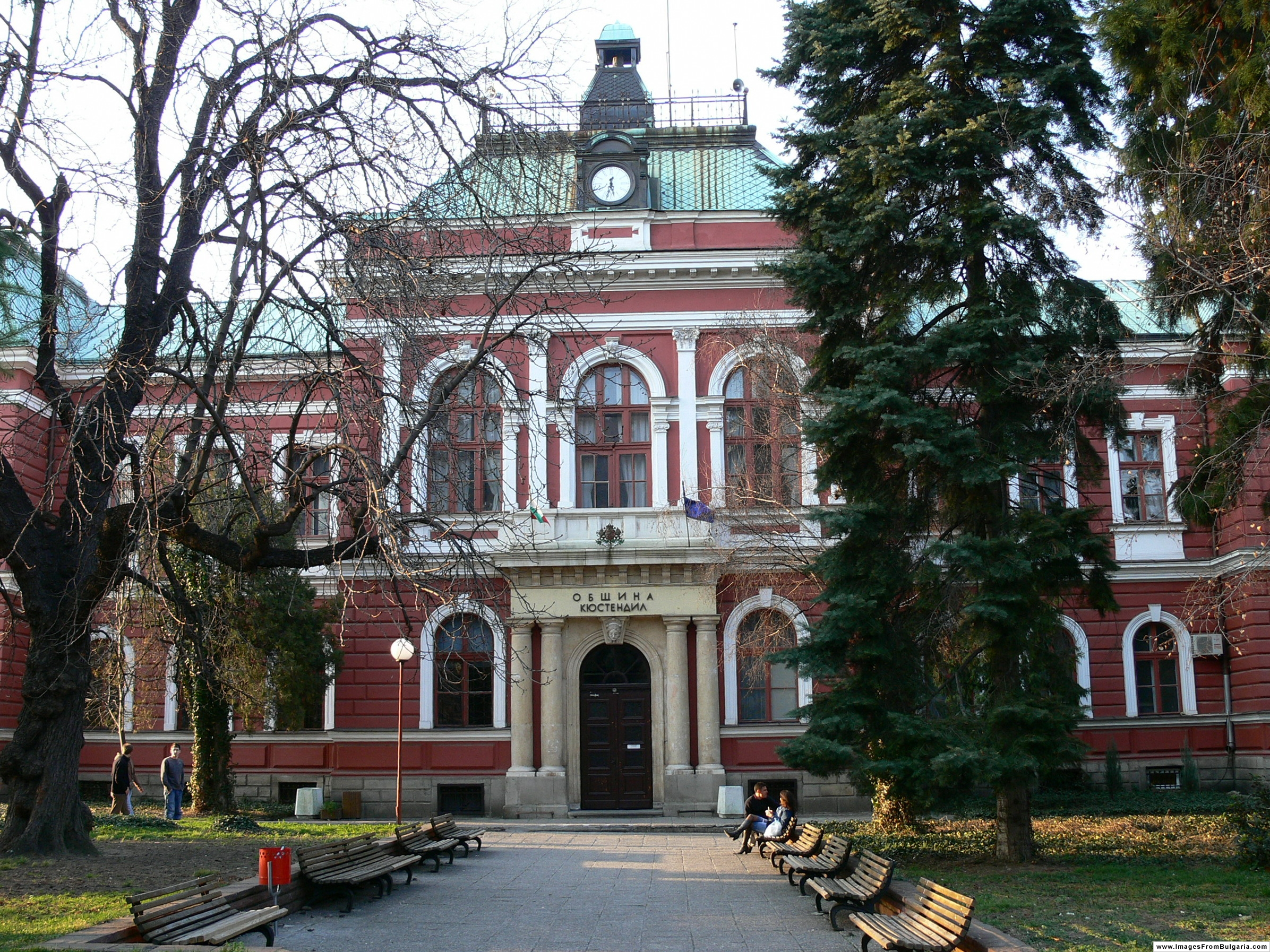
The municipality hall (architect Friedrich Grünanger)

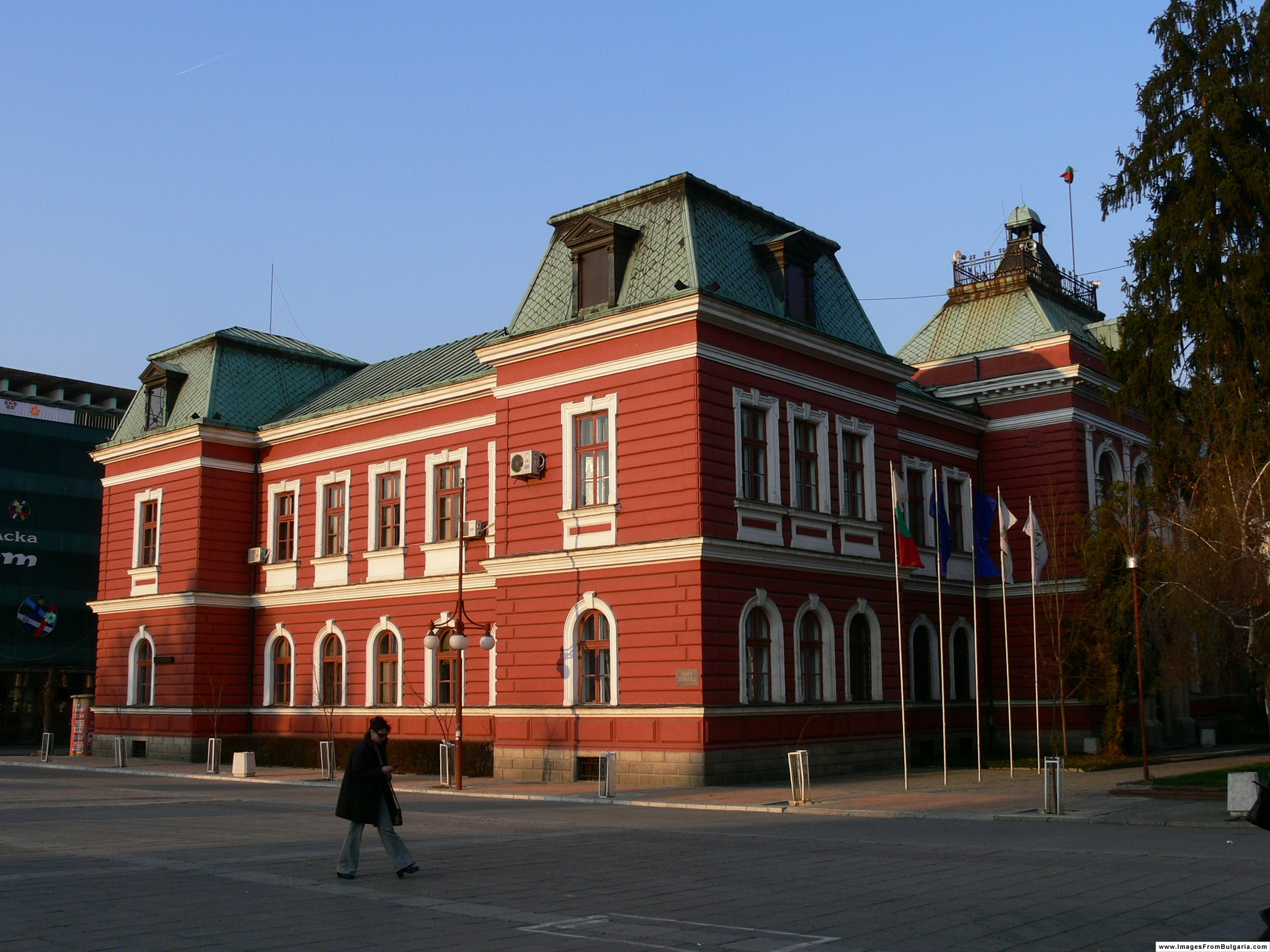
The municipality hall

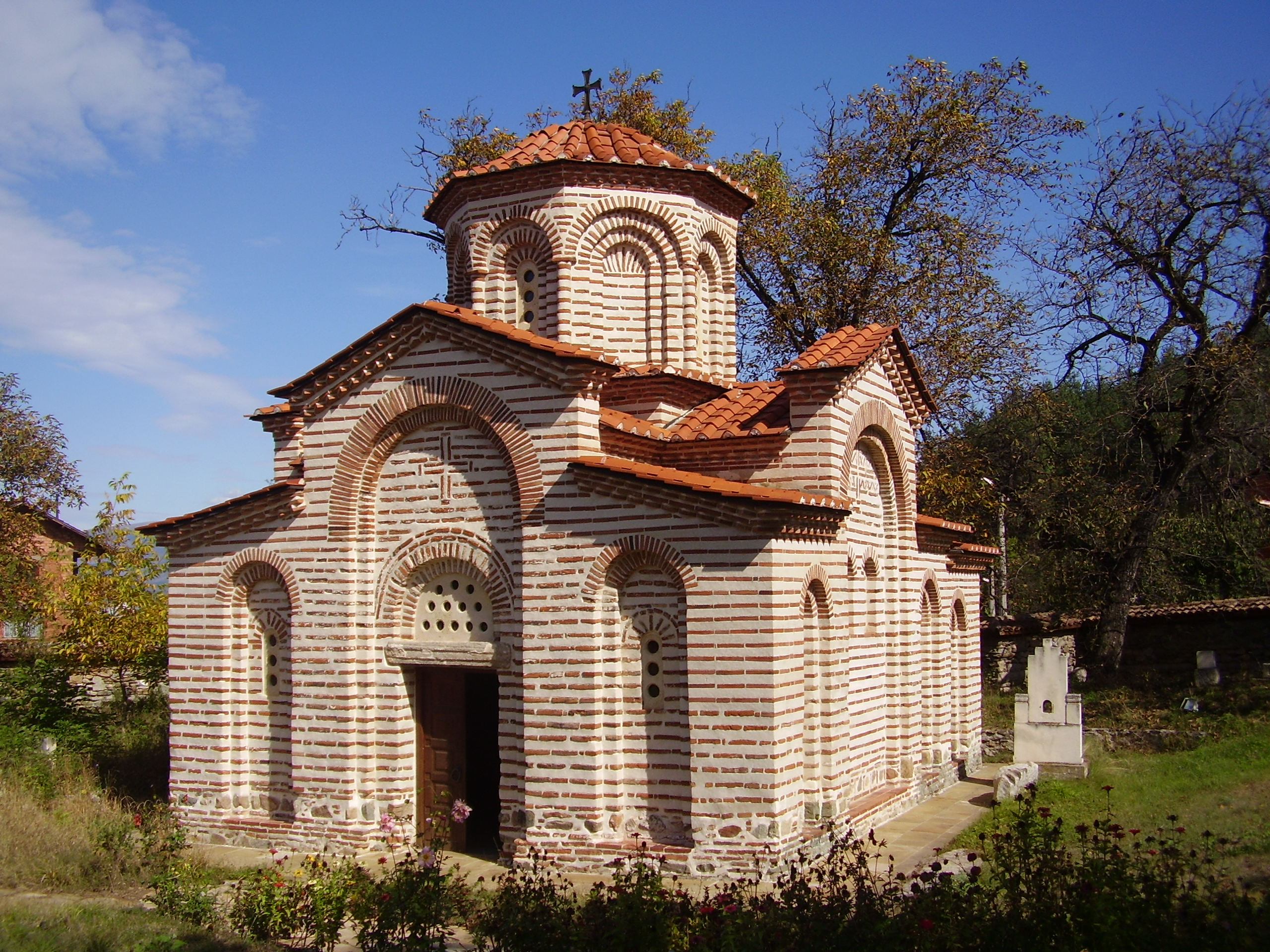
10th-11th-century Church of St George in the Kolusha neighbourhood

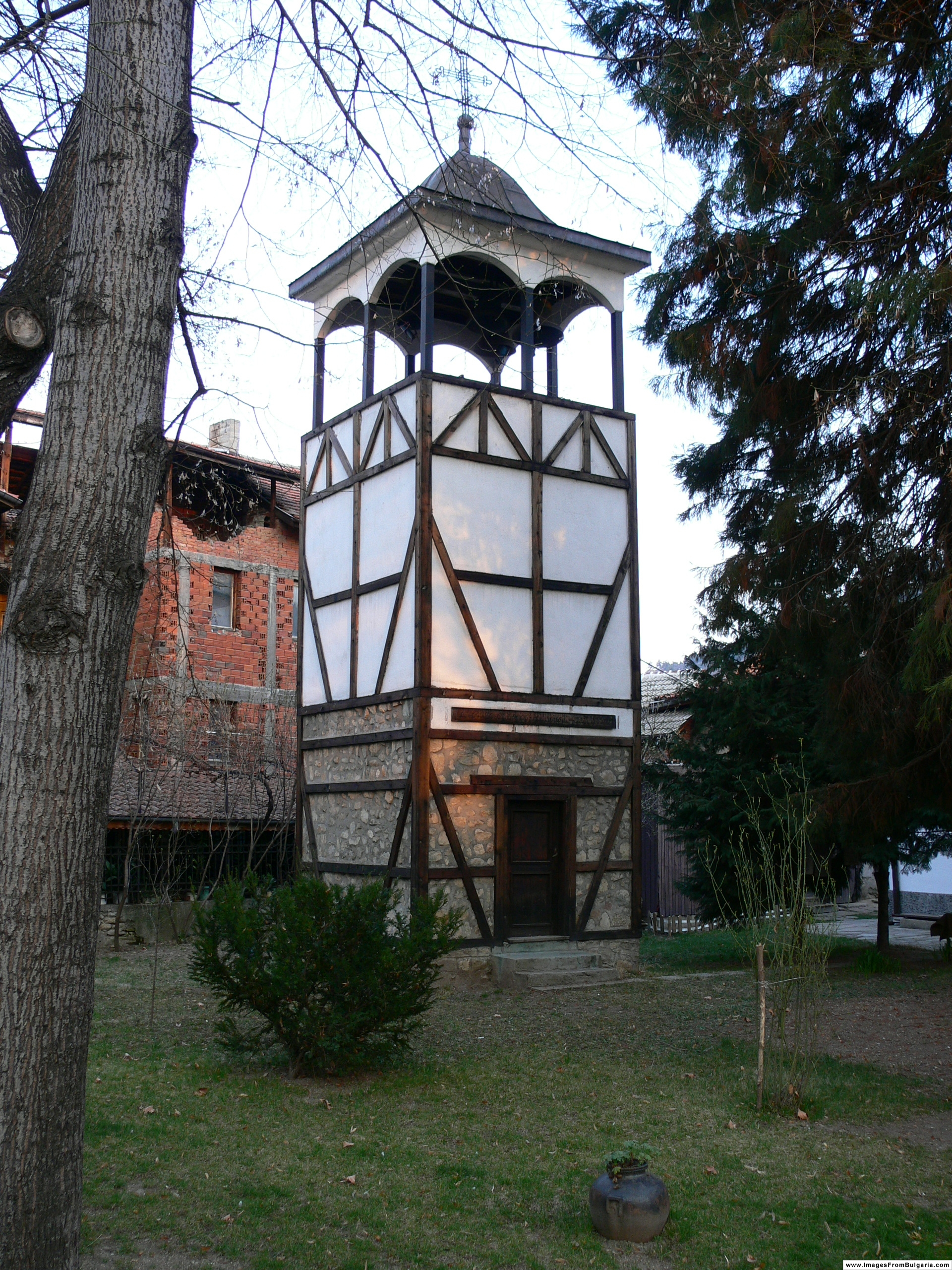
Timber-framed tower

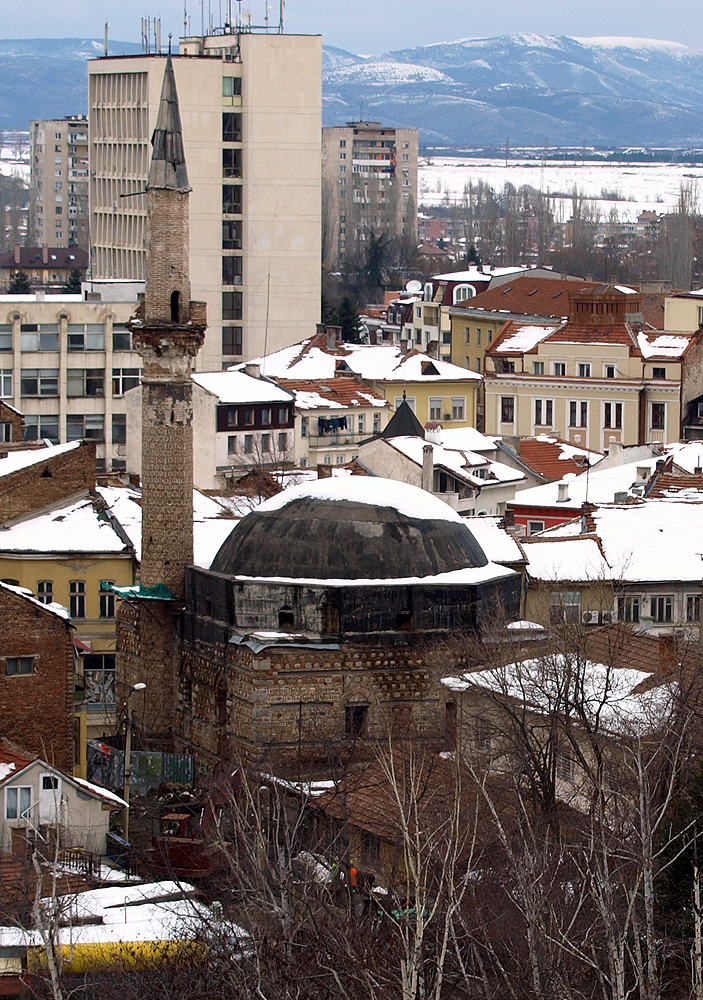
Fatih Mehmet Mosque (15th century)

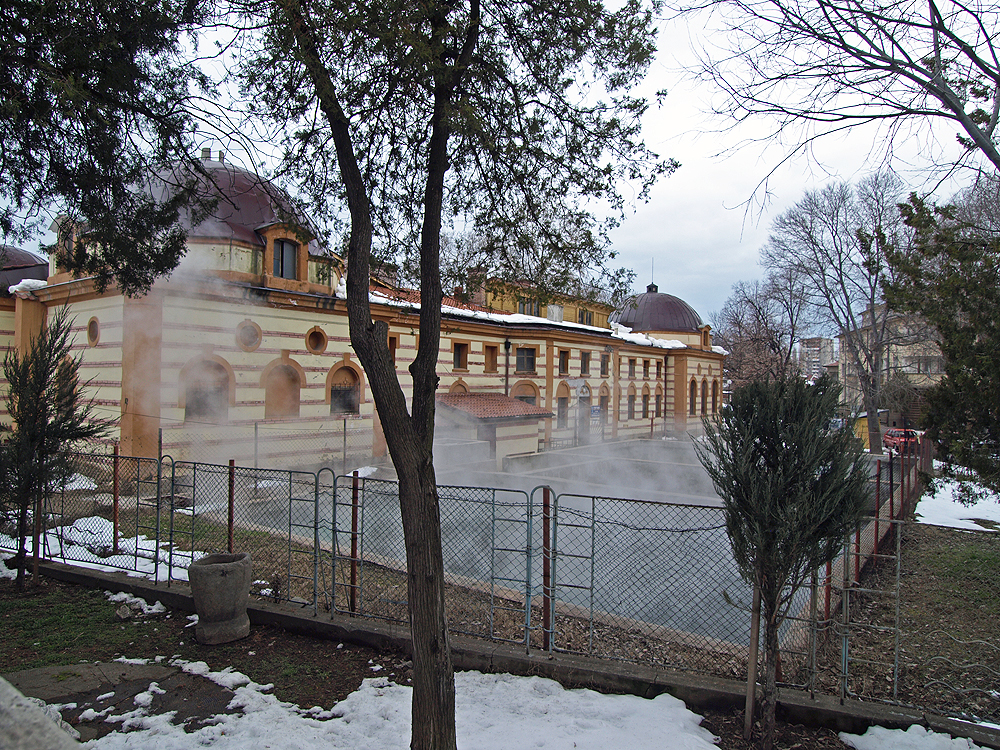
Cifte Spa Bath

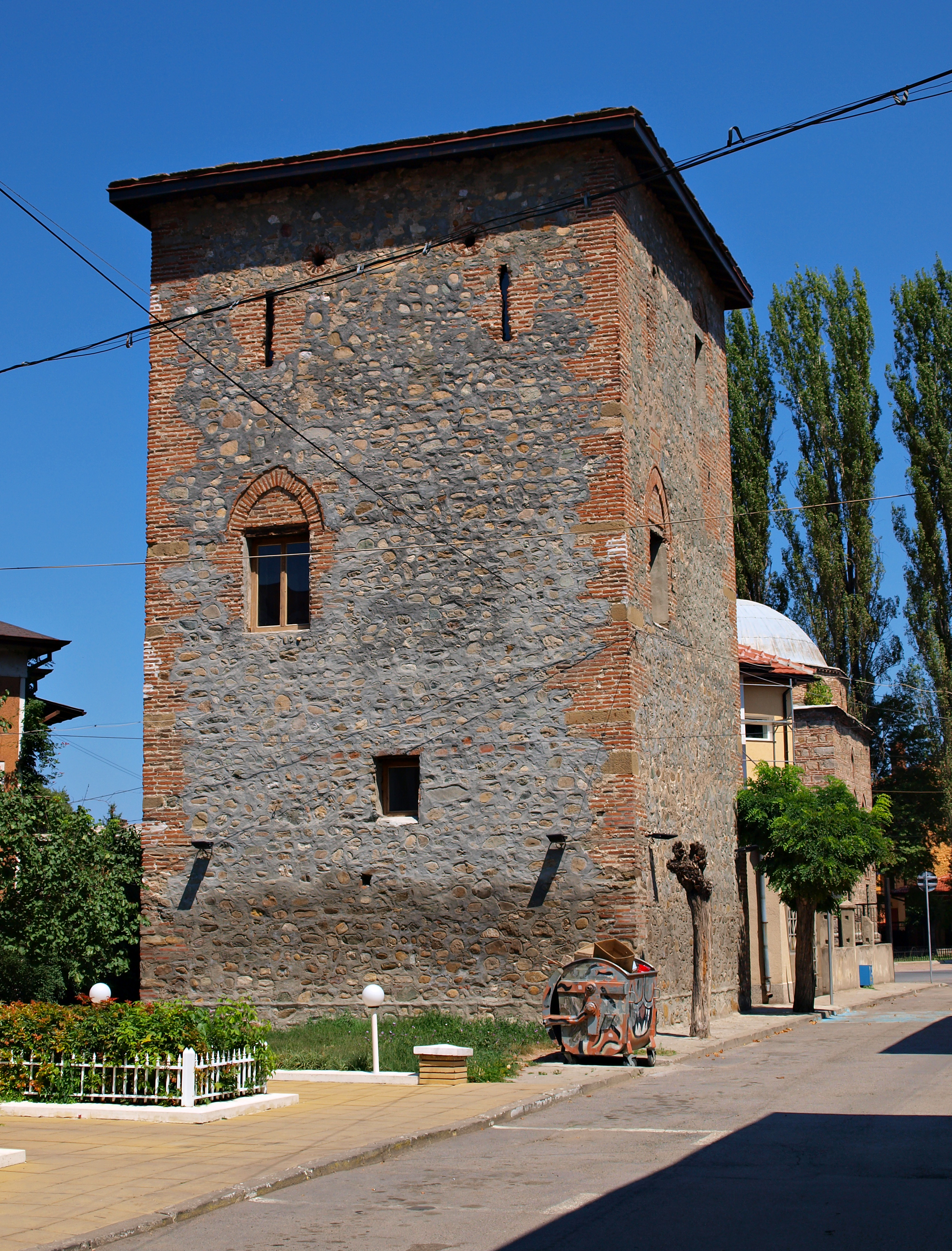
The 15th-16th-century Pyrgos Tower

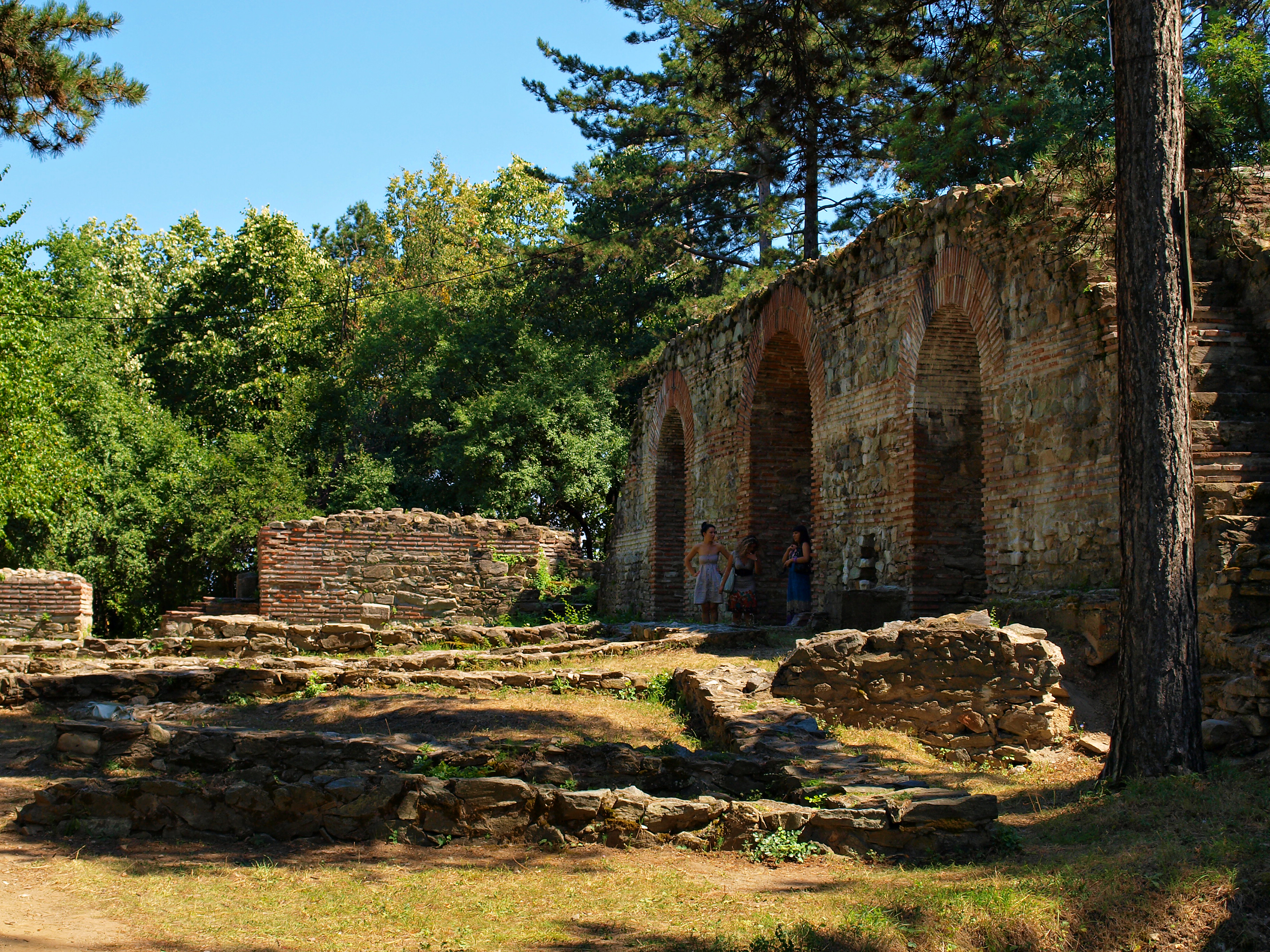
The Hisarlaka medieval fortress lying atop a hill overlooking the town

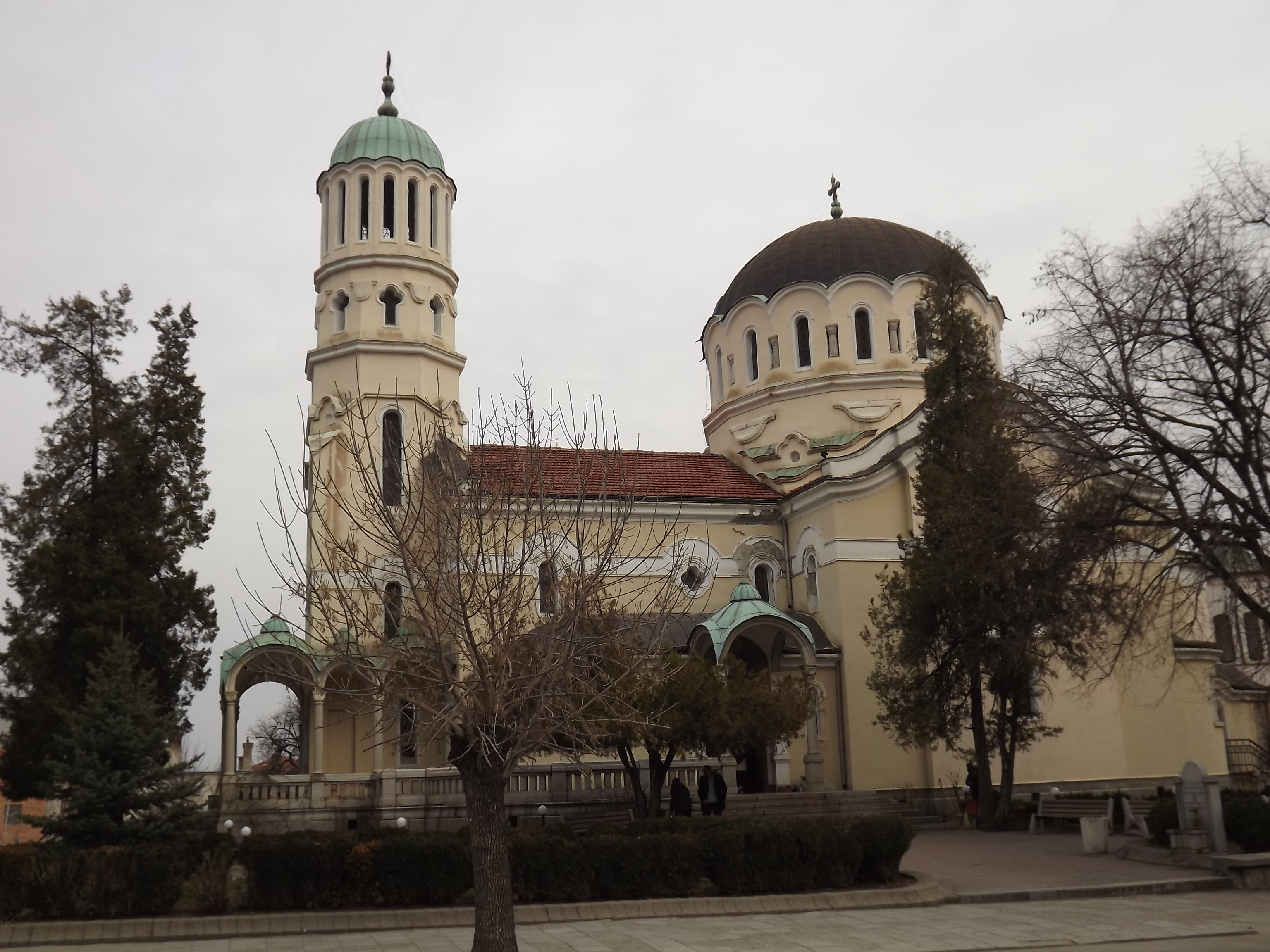
The Church of Saint Menas, built in 1859, situated in the west part of Kystendil.

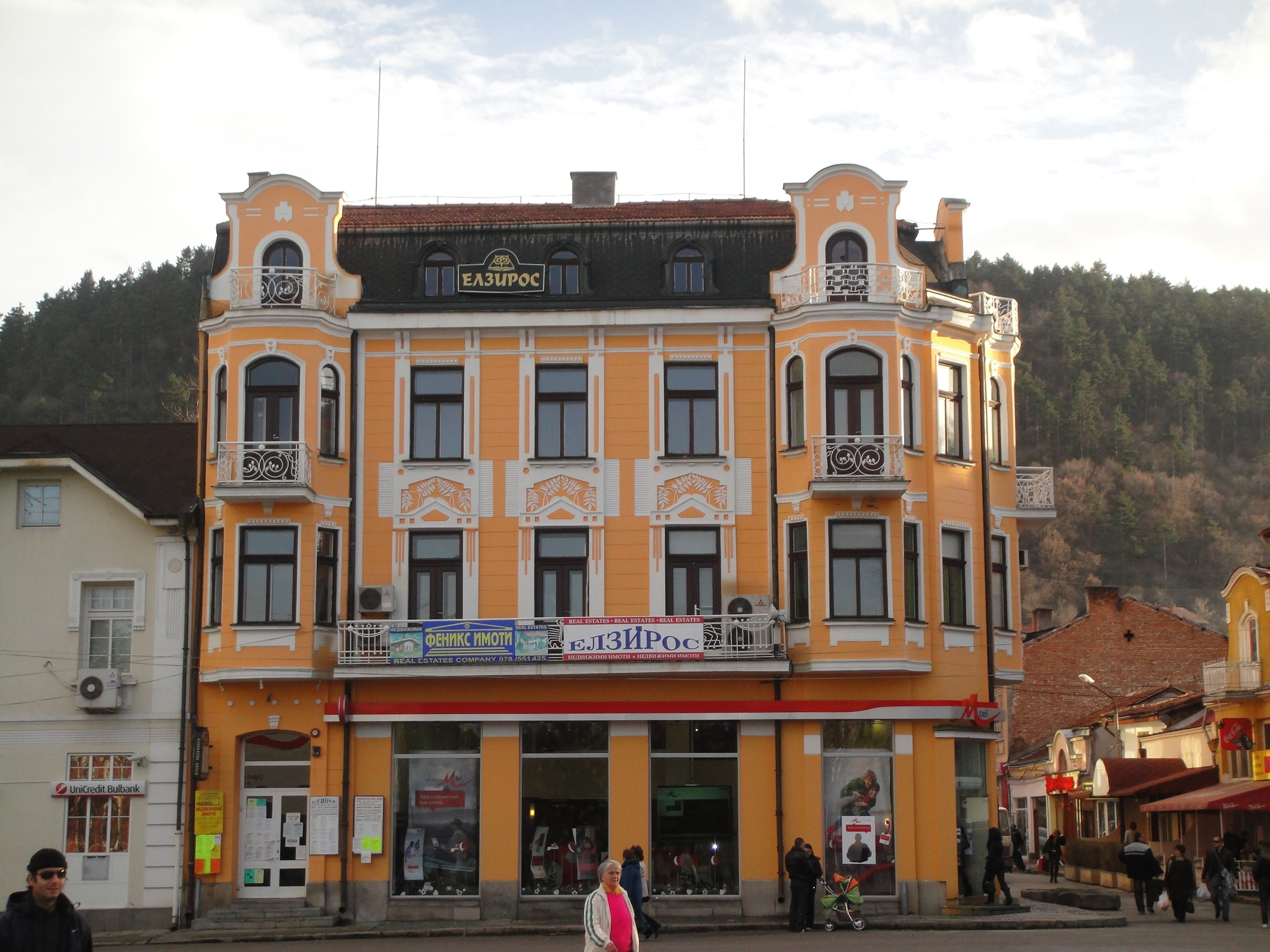
Building in Kyustendil

== See also ==
- FC Velbazhd Kyustendil (Pautalia during World War II)
- List of Catholic dioceses in Bulgaria

== Twin towns ==
- Mátranovák, Hungary

== Sources and external links ==
- Media related to Kyustendil at Wikimedia Commons
- Kyustendil District Administration Provides information about the region, photos, historical review, and development projects
- Kyustendil tourist destination – tourism opportunities in the Kyustendil region
- Kustendil Info, Information web Portal of Kyustendil
- KnCity.info, a website about Kyustendil
- Kyustendil at Journey.bg
- Kyustendil at BGGlobe
- Regional History Museum
- GCatholic - former (Pautalia) & titular see of Velebusdus

Bibliography - ecclesiastical history

- Pius Bonifacius Gams, Series episcoporum Ecclesiae Catholicae, Leipzig 1931, pp. 417 e 432
- Daniele Farlati-Jacopo Coleti, Illyricum Sacrum, volume VIII, Venece 1817, p. 77 e p. 246
- Konrad Eubel, Hierarchia Catholica Medii Aevi, volume 1, p. 130
- Jacques Zeiller, Les origines chrétiennes dans les provinces danubiennes de l'empire romain, Paris 1918, p. 160
