= Danlami =

- Gender: Male
- Language(s): Hausa

Origin
- Word/name: West Africa
- Meaning: Born on Thursday

Danlami is a masculine name of Hausa origins, West Africa. It is directly translated into English as "born on a Thursday". So in line with its meaning, it is usually given to children born on a Thursday.

== Notable people with the name ==
- Joel Danlami Ikenya, Nigerian politician
- Joseph Danlami Bagobiri, Nigerian Roman Catholic bishop
