= Roman Catholic Diocese of Yola =

Roman Catholic diocese in Nigeria

Diocese of Yola Dioecesis Yolaensis

Location
- Country: Nigeria
- Territory: Adamawa State
- Ecclesiastical province: Jos
- Metropolitan: Jos
- Coordinates: 9°12′00″N 12°28′59″E

Statistics
- Area: 36,917 km^{2} (14,254 sq mi)
- Population: Total; Catholics: (as of 2022); 4,258,452; 196,000 (4.6%)
- Parishes: 78

Information
- Denomination: Roman Catholic
- Rite: Latin Rite
- Established: July 2, 1962
- Cathedral: Saint Theresa Cathedral in Yola
- Secular priests: 58

Current leadership
- Pope: Leo XIV
- Bishop: Stephen Dami Mamza

Map
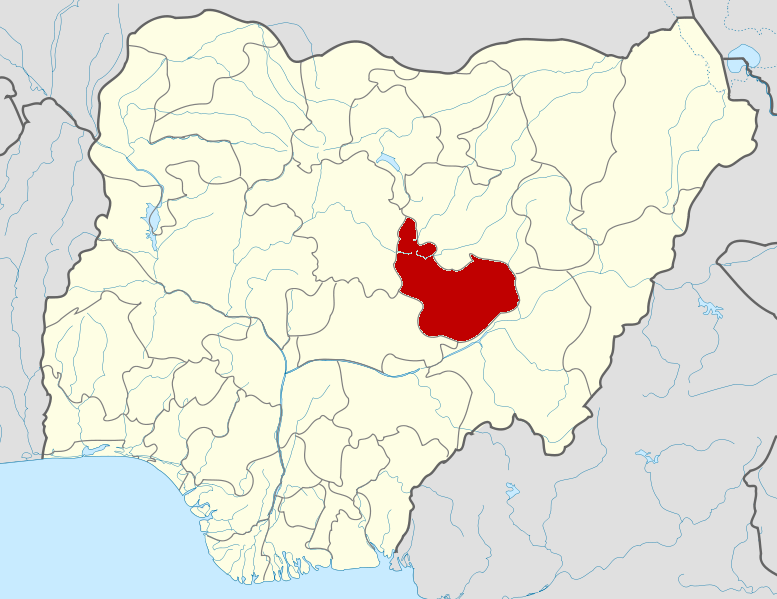
- Plateau State is shown in red.

The Roman Catholic Diocese of Yola (Latin: Yolaën(sis)) is a diocese located in the city of Yola in Adamawa state and in the ecclesiastical province of Jos, Plateau state, Nigeria.

== History ==
- July 14, 1950: Established as Apostolic Prefecture of Yola from the Diocese of Buéa in Cameroon, the Apostolic Prefecture of Jos and the Apostolic Prefecture of Oturkpo
- July 2, 1962: Promoted as Diocese of Yola

== Special churches ==
The Cathedral is St Theresa's Cathedral in Yola.

== Bishops ==
- Prefect Apostolic of Yola (Roman rite)
  - Father Patrick Joseph Dalton, O.S.A. (1950.10.27 – 1962.07.02 see below)
- Bishops of Yola
  - Bishop Patrick Joseph Dalton, O.S.A. (see above 1962.07.02 – 1969.11.29)
  - Bishop Patrick Francis Sheehan, O.S.A. (1970.09.21 – 1996.07.05), appointed Vicar Apostolic of Kano
  - Bishop Christopher Shaman Abba (1996.07.05 - 2010.01.09)
  - Bishop Stephen Dami Mamza (2011.02.18 - )

=== Other priests of this diocese who became bishop ===
- Charles Michael Hammawa, appointed Bishop of Jalingo in 2008
- Matthew Man-oso Ndagoso, appointed Bishop of Maiduguri in 2003

== See also ==
- Roman Catholicism in Nigeria

== Sources ==
- GCatholic.org Information
- Catholic Hierarchy
