= Roman Catholic Diocese of Maiduguri =

Catholic diocese in Nigeria

Diocese of Maiduguri Dioecesis Maiduguriensis

Location
- Country: Nigeria
- Territory: Borno State
- Ecclesiastical province: Jos
- Metropolitan: Jos
- Coordinates: 11°50′47″N 13°09′36″E

Statistics
- Area: 132,000 km^{2} (51,000 sq mi)
- Population: Total; Catholics: (as of 2022); 7,250,000; 226,000 (3.1%)
- Parishes: 43

Information
- Denomination: Catholic Church
- Sui iuris church: Latin Church
- Rite: Roman Rite
- Established: June 7, 1966; 60 years ago
- Cathedral: Saint Patrick's Cathedral in Maiduguri
- Secular priests: 65

Current leadership
- Pope: Leo XIV
- Bishop: Oliver Dashe Doeme
- Auxiliary Bishops: John Bogna Bakeni
- Vicar General: Donatus Tizhe (Administration); John William (Pastoral)

Map
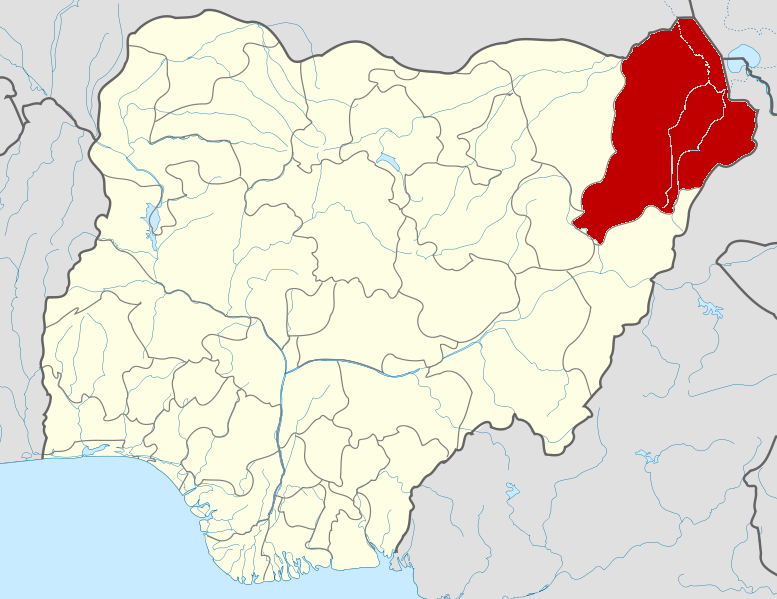
- Maiduguri is in Borno State shown in red

The Diocese of Maiduguri (Latin: Dioecesis Maiduguriensis) is a Latin Church diocese of the Catholic Church located in the city of Maiduguri in the ecclesiastical province of Jos in Nigeria.

== History ==
- June 29, 1953: Established as Apostolic Prefecture of Maiduguri from Apostolic Prefecture of Jos
- June 7, 1966: Promoted as Diocese of Maiduguri

== Special churches ==
The Cathedral is St Patrick's Cathedral in Maiduguri.

== Bishops ==
- Prefects Apostolic of Maiduguri (Roman rite)
  - Father James Timothy Kieran Cotter, O.S.A. (1962.07.05 – 1966.06.07 see below)
- Bishops of Maiduguri (Roman rite)
  - Bishop James Timothy Kieran Cotter, O.S.A. (see above 1966.06.07 – 1988.03.15)
  - Bishop Senan Louis O'Donnell, O.S.A. (1993.09.18 – 2003.02.28)
  - Bishop Matthew Man-Oso Ndagoso (2003.02.28 - 2007.11.16), appointed Archbishop of Kaduna
  - Bishop Oliver Dashe Doeme (6 Jun 2009 Appointed - present)
  - John Bogna Bakeni, appointed Auxiliary Bishop of Maiduguri 12 April 2022

=== Other priests of this diocese who became bishop ===
- Stephen Dami Mamza, appointed Bishop of Yola in 2011

== Persecution and insecurity ==
Maiduguri was the diocese that suffered most from Boko Haram, having endured close to a decade of fierce persecution. Since 2020, however, the terrorist group has not carried out significant attacks in Maiduguri, a fact that Bishop Oliver Doeme attributes to divine intervention, in response to a Rosary prayer campaign he began after having a vision in which the Virgin Mary handed him a sword which turned into a Rosary. "The war was won on bended knee", he told journalists during a conference organised by Aid to the Church in Need, in July 2022.

In the same conference he explained that his region of Nigeria is now relatively peaceful. "To a large extent we can say that the north-eastern part of the country is more peaceful than other parts, because Nigeria is now in crisis, and we are experiencing a lot of evil forces in our country. You have the Fulani herdsmen attacking Christian communities, you have the bandits attacking communities and taking people away. The church is not spared. In different parts of the north, priests have been killed. So, the crisis may be subsiding in the northeast, but not in other parts of the north and even in the south."

On 1 June 2025 Fr Alphonsuns Afina was kidnapped by members of Boko Haram–Islamic State West Africa Province (ISWAP), he spent almost two months in the hands of his kidnappers, before being released on 27 July.

In February 2026 Bishop Oliver Doeme claimed that, despite more than a decade of persecution and fear, Christians were returning to churches to worship openly. He added that the insecurity had killed around 1000 Christians and led to the displacement of up to 90 thousand others, but that the situation had since improved. In an article published by Aid to the Church in Need, the bishop is quoted as saying: "The faith of our people is unshakeable. The number of Catholics we have in our diocese now is more than the number of Catholics we had before the Boko Haram crisis. We have a lot of weddings taking place, the number of children receiving Holy Communion has shot up, the number of children being baptised goes to 1,000. The difference is in thousands, not in the hundreds."

Three Christians were among 28 killed in a series of bombing attacks allegedly carried out by ISWAP militants in towns in Maiduguri diocese, according to the testimony of Fr. Joseph Fidelis, in March 2026.

== See also ==
- Roman Catholicism in Nigeria
