= Habila Daboh =

Nigerian Catholic prelate (born 1970)

Habila Tyiakwonaboi Daboh (born 10 June 1970) is a Nigerian Catholic prelate who has served as the bishop of the Diocese of Zaria since 2023. 25 bishops were reportedly present during the episcopal consecration of Daboh at St. Joseph's Minor Seminary in Basawa-Zaria, Kaduna, among them, Matthew Hassan Kukah, bishop of Sokoto diocese and Matthew Man-Oso Ndagoso, the vice president of the Catholic Bishops Conference of Nigeria.
