= Diocese of Kano =

Roman Catholic diocese in Nigeria

Diocese of Kano Dioecesis Kanensis

Location
- Country: Nigeria
- Territory: Kano State
- Ecclesiastical province: Kaduna
- Metropolitan: Kaduna
- Coordinates: 11°59′39″N 8°30′49″E

Statistics
- Area: 43,819 km^{2} (16,919 sq mi)
- Population: Total; Catholics: (as of 2022); 14,325,400; 254,200 (1.8%)
- Parishes: 36

Information
- Denomination: Roman Catholic
- Rite: Latin Rite
- Established: April 22, 1999
- Cathedral: Cathedral of Our Lady of Fatima in Kano
- Secular priests: 44

Current leadership
- Pope: Leo XIV
- Bishop: Most Rev. John Namawzah Niyiring

Map
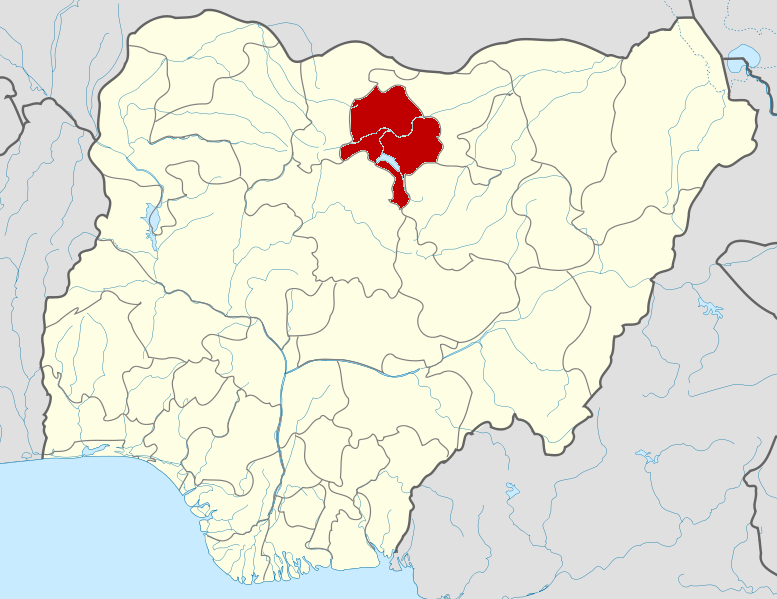
- Kano State is shown in red.

Website
- Our Lady of Fatima Cathedral Parish in Kano

The Roman Catholic Diocese of Kano (Latin: Kanen(sis)) is a diocese located in the city of Kano in the ecclesiastical province of Kaduna in Nigeria.

== History ==
- March 22, 1991: Established as Mission “sui iuris” of Kano from the Metropolitan Archdiocese of Kaduna
- December 15, 1995: Promoted as Apostolic Vicariate of Kano
- April 22, 1999: Promoted as Diocese of Kano

== Special churches ==
The Cathedral is Cathedral of Our Lady of Fatima in Kano.

== Leadership ==
- Ecclesiastical Superior of Kano (Roman rite)
  - Fr. John Francis Brown, S.M.A. (1991 – 1995)
- Vicar Apostolic of Kano (Roman rite)
  - Bishop Patrick Francis Sheehan, O.S.A. (1996.07.05 – 1999.06.22 see below)
- Bishops of Kano (Roman rite)
  - Bishop Patrick Francis Sheehan, O.S.A. (see above 1999-2008)
  - Bishop John Namawzah Niyiring, O.S.A., since 20 March 2008

== See also ==
- Roman Catholicism in Nigeria
