= Irina Taseva =

Bulgarian actress

Irina Tasseva
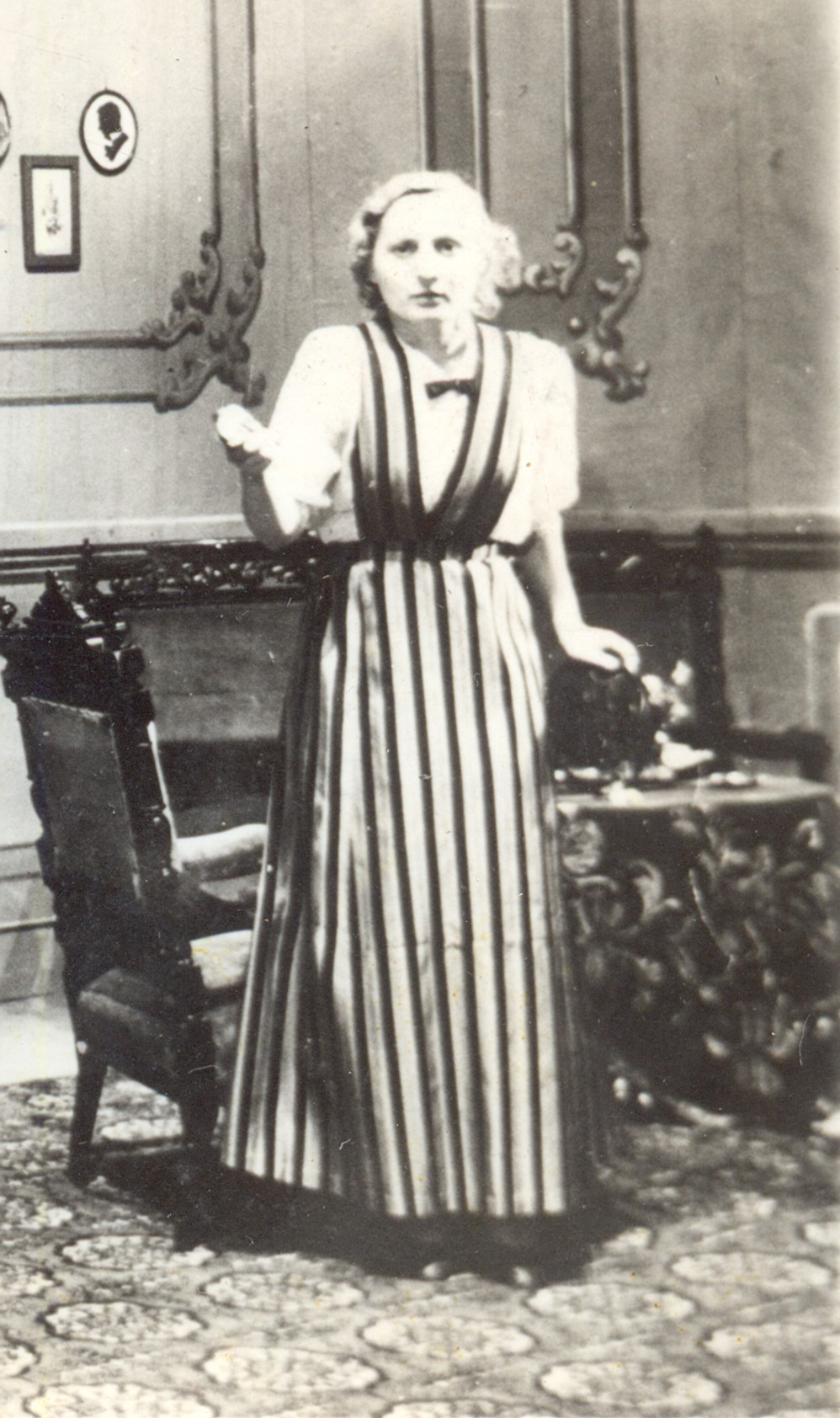
- Irina Taseva in 1939 staging "When Thunder Strikes" by P. Yavorov
- Born: July 22, 1910; Kiustendil, Bulgaria
- Died: February 21, 1990 (aged 79); Sofia, Bulgaria
- Occupation: Actress

Irina Taseva (in Bulgarian: Ирина Тасева) was a Bulgarian actress. She was born on July 22, 1910, in the town of Kiustendil, Bulgaria. She graduated from high school in Sofia, Bulgaria and then enrolled in drama theatre classes with the Ivan Vazov National Theatre in Sofia. She first stepped onto the stage in 1930 and played many classical roles. Her career as an actress ended in 1980, and she died on February 21, 1990, in Sofia.

== Roles ==
=== Ivan Vazov National Theatre ===
1. The Pearls by Bruno Frank, director Nokolay Fol, role – chambermaid, first night (FN) October 7, 1930.
2. From its brains does it suffer by Alexander Sergeevich Griboedov, director Nikolay Ossipovich Massalitinov (NOM), role – one of the six daughters, FN October 28, 1930.
3. Ionchovi's inns by Stephen Savov, director NOM, role – Savo, FN September 12, 1931.
4. It is not easy to be a father by Carpenter, director Hrisan Tzankov, role – Tony Chratohvil, FN November 5, 1932 (first and last meeting on stage with the major actor Sava Ognianov).
5. Madame Saint-Jeanne by Victorien Sardou, director Hrisan Tzankov, role – Madame Saint-Jeanne, FN November 14, 1932.
6. Young years of a queen by Silvara, director Hrisan Tzankov, role – Victoria, FN October 11, 1934 (the main part was played by Christyo Sarafov).
7. Sad family by Branislav Nushich, director NOM, role – Danitza, FN February 19, 1935.
8. The wild duck by H. Ibsen, director NOM, role – Hedwig, FN October 5, 1939.
9. Peggy, my joy, directed by Dimitar Panov in the Veliko Tarnovo Community Center theatre, role – Peggy, FN 1939 (author unknown).
10. Is Constance right by S. Mogham, director Hrisan Tzankov, role - Marie-Louise, FN December 12, 1940.
11. Mashenka by Alexander T. Athinogenov, director Nikolay Petrov (a director in the Russian Academic theatre – guest of the Bulgarian National Theatre), role – Mashenka, partner Krastyo sarafov, FN October 10, 1946.
12. Egor Bulichov and the others by Maxim Gorky, director Boyan Danovski, role – Alexandra, partner Krastyo Sarafov, FN February 24, 1949.
13. Voice of America by Alexander Lavrenov, director Philip Philipov, role – Sintia Kid, FN December 25, 1950.
14. Romeo and Juliet by W. Shakespeare, director Stephen Sarchadziev, role – Juliet, partner Apostol Karamitev, FN February 9, 1954.
15. Don Charlos by Friedrich Schiller, director Krastyo Mirski, role – Eboly, partner Vladimir Trendafilov, FN May 12, 1955.
16. A judge in a trap by Henry Fidling, director Stephen Sarchadziev, role – Hilary, FN April 6, 1958.
17. Scandal in Brickmill by John Pristley, director Mois Beniesh, role – Delia Moone, FN January 12, 1961.
18. Candida by B. Shore, director Krastyo Mirski, role – Candida, FN June 9, 1962.
19. A traveler with no luggage by Jean Anouhi, director Philip Philipov, role – countess Dupon Duffore, FN December 19, 1965.
20. Kaloyan by kamen Zidarov, director Miroslav Mindov, role – Theodora, FN April 15, 1970.
21. Appointment by Alexander Volodin, director Dimitar Stoyanov, role – the mother, FN April 18, 1979.

=== Children's Theatre with the National Theatre ===
1. Goryo and Boryo by G. Karaivanov, director Boris Borozanov, 1939.
2. The small king, Bisserka, The tailor prince, The magic ring, Tom Thumb, The sleeping princess, Dinyo the lazy boy, For 30 coins and The Bad friend. All these plays were played 1939–1943 and were directed by Boris Borozanov.
