= Pautalia =

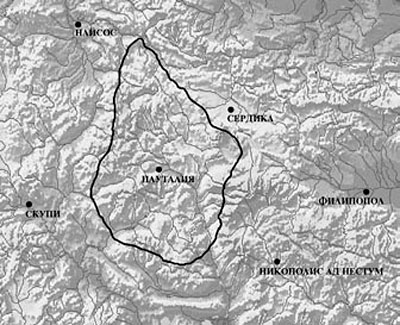
The suburban territory of Pautalia.

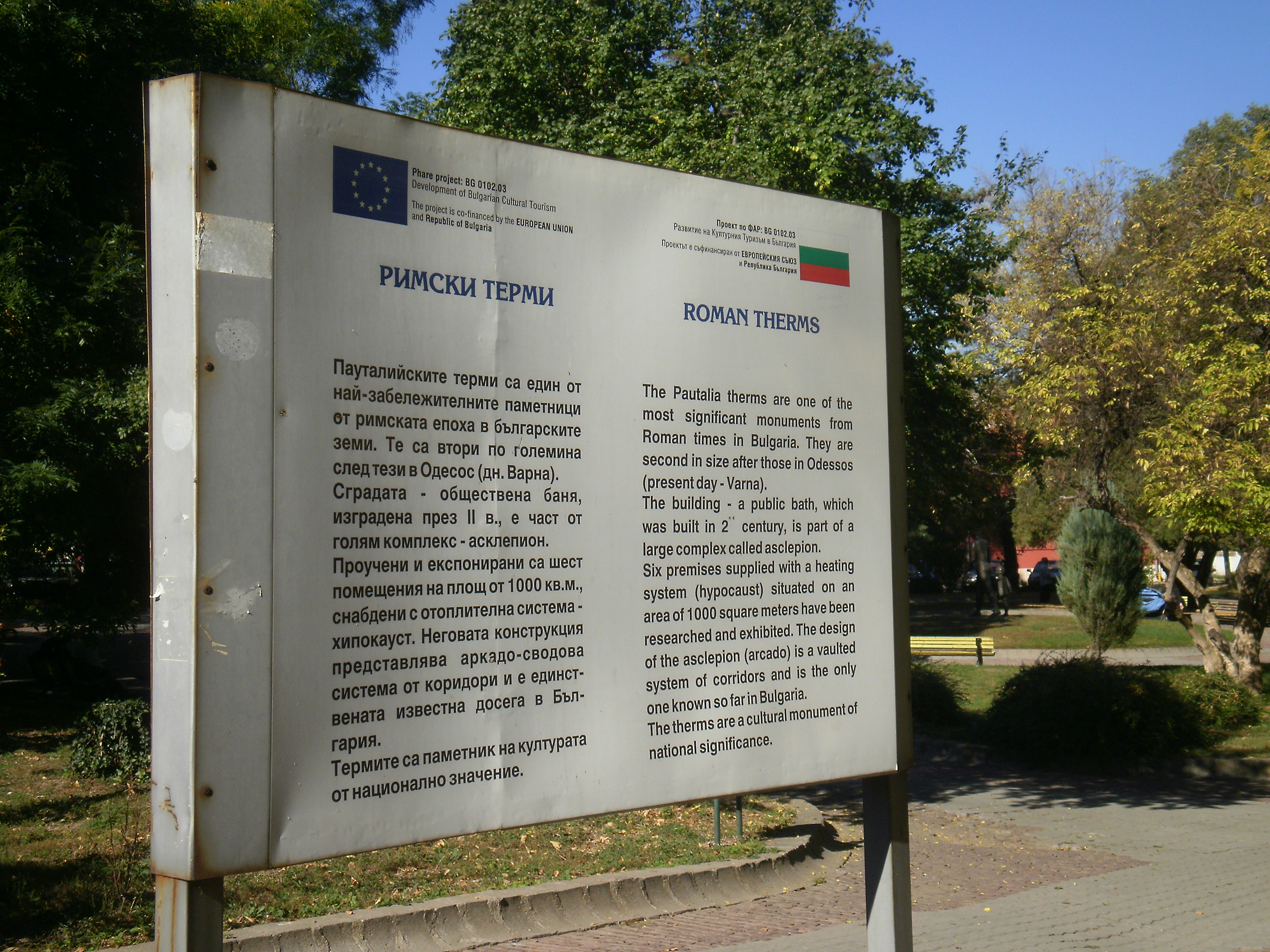
The Pautalia therms.

Pautalia is one of the great ancient cities of Thrace, now located in Kyustendil, Bulgaria. It was a settlement of the Dentheletae, a Thracian tribe, and had been occupied since at least the Iron Age. It is noted for its temple of Asclepius on the hill of Hissarlaka (Hisarlaka).

The name is Thracian and means "spring city", referring to the hot springs there. The earliest preserved mention of the city is in a list of 135 Roman Municipia in Thrace from 106 C.E. which list included the settlements on the site of today's Sofia, Plovdiv and Stara Zagora. From the first name of Emperor Trajan, Pautalia received its first name — Ulpia Pautalia. During the regnum of the Roman Empire Pautalia minted its own coins, from the time of emperors Antoninus Pius to Caracalla, and possibly into the reign of Elagabalus.

The urban planning of Pautalia was similar to that of other ancient Greek and Asia Minor cities. However, the ancient Pautalia streets are noticeably wider than other ancient cities located in today's Bulgaria. The ancient city was quite large, a number of public buildings, basilicas and baths were portrayed on its coins. In the city there were temples of Asclepius, Zeus, Sabazios, Hera, Apollo, Hermes, Demeter, Heracles and other deities from the ancient Greek pantheon. Temples have also been discovered in the vicinity of Pautalia. There were many statues in the city, including a horse statue of Lucius Verus.

Pautalia had a city assembly (Boule), magistrates, courts and coinage. Power was exercised by four archons and the city councilors. Pautalia had a college for buildings and for arranging sports competitions. The xystarch was in charge of the youth competitions, and the education was in charge of the gymnasiarch. The administrative, economic and cultural language was ancient Greek, and there were teachers of rhetoric and law in the city. In the time of Marcus Aurelius, the provincial governor's name was Apollonius.

The official religious cult was towards Jupiter and Juno, but under Septimius Severus the imperial cult also intensified. Pautalia had a priestly college. Eastern deities — Mithras, Cybele, Sarapis — were also worshiped in Pautalia.

Pautalia had developed crafts, and the surrounding field suggested developed fruit growing. The manager of the city market was called an agoranomos.

In the 2nd century, the first fortress wall was built in the time of the emperors Marcus Aurelius and Commodus. Archaeology in the ancient fortress has revealed three periods of construction — after the Gothic invasions of the Balkans (270); during the emperors Valentinian and Valens and during the early Byzantine era. In late antiquity, a fortress was built on the hill south of the city, Hissarlaka, which has the same name as the hill in Troy. This second fortification was built in the second half of the 4th century and underwent several repairs and reconstructions over the next 5th and 6th centuries. Probably the last fortification dates back to the reign of Emperor Justinian the Great.

During the reign of Emperor Aurelian, Pautalia was the third largest city in Dacia Mediterranea — after Serdica and Naissus. Around the city there were a number of small settlements — castles. In one of them was born the famous general Belisarius.

The last mention of Pautalia dates from 553 C.E.

== Sources ==
- "Пауталия [Pautalia]". Енциклопедичен речник Кюстендил [Encyclopedic Dictionary of Kyustendil]. Българската академия на науките [Bulgarian Academy of Sciences]. 1988. pp. 499–500.
