= Dentheletae =

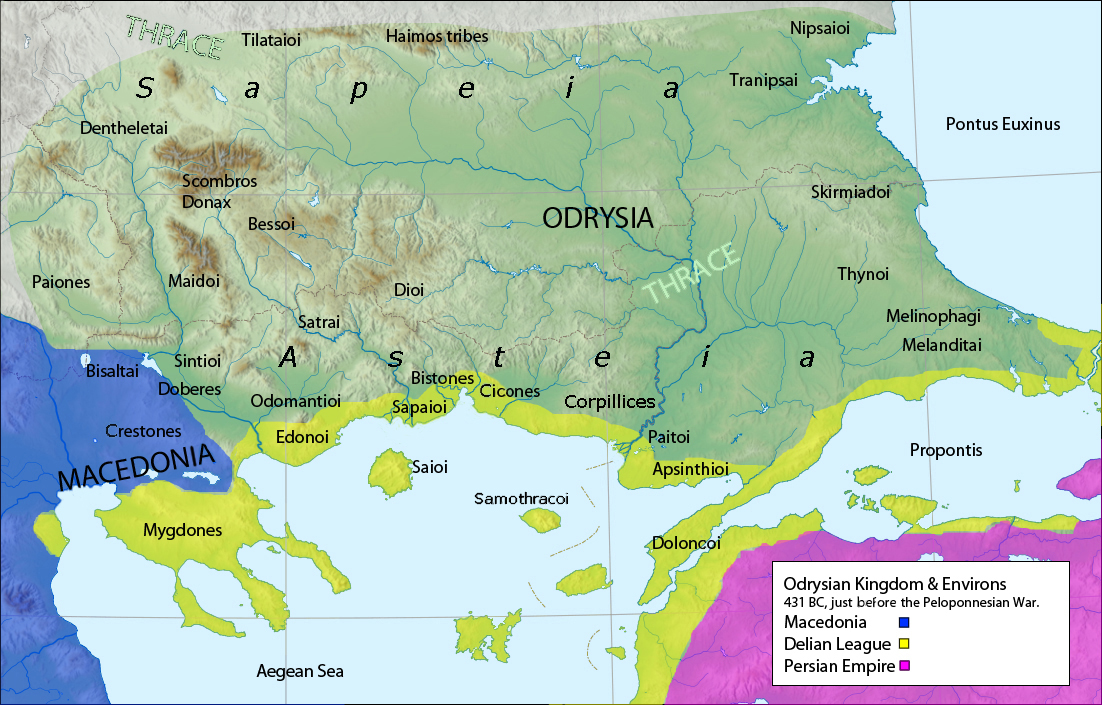
Approximate location of the Dentheletae in the second half of the 5th century BC.

Approximate location of the Dentheletae

The Dentheletae (Greek: Δενθελῆται), also Danthaletae (Δανθαλῆται) or Denseletae, were a Thracian tribe that in antiquity lived near the sources of the River Strymon, and are mentioned in texts by Polybius, Cassius Dio, Tacitus and by Livy. They lived in the neighbourhoods of the modern towns Kyustendil (ancient Pautalia) and Dupnitsa (ancient Germania, from the Thracian word for "hot", due to its springs), stretching to as far as the mountains to the west towards the valleys of the Morava and the Vardar river, with territories situated next to the Thracian tribes Agrianes (per Theopompus) and the Maedi (per Strabo). Their main city, called Dentheletica, was presumably Pautalia (modern-day Kyustendil) as this was the capital of the Roman region Dentheletica. They possibly built fortifications around Stara Planina in the 1st century BC, lived around Sofia and Skaptopara (modern Blagoevgrad) was their town.

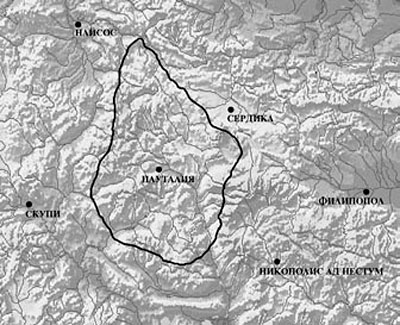
The Roman strategy of Danteletike

Livy mentions them in passing in his account of King Philip V of Macedon, who in 214BC plundered them for supplies even though they were his ally. The Dentheletae were allies of Rome. Along with the Scordisci, the Dentheletae invaded Macedonia.

Circa 30BC, when under their king 'Sitas, who was blind', and whilst under treaty with Rome, their territories were invaded by the Bastarnae. In response to this invasion and with the wider objective of securing the Macedonia/Thrace frontier of the Roman Empire, Consul Marcus Licinus Crassus Dives (grandson of Crassus the triumvir) earned a triumph for his attack on the Bastarnae in defense of the Denteleti in 28-29BC with Legio IIII Scythica, Legio V Macedonica and possibly Legio X Fretensis.

Raids in Dardania 16-13BC marked the end of the Dentheletae.

In late antiquity, the area of the Dentheletae was Greek-speaking.

== See also ==
- List of Thracian tribes
