= John Bakeni =

Catholic bishop of Maiduguri Diocese

John Bogna Bakeni (born 15 March 1975 in Kiri, Maiduguri) is a Catholic prelate and bishop of Diocese of Maiduguri since 12 April 2022.

== Education ==
John Bakeni attended Saint Peter’s Minor Seminary in Yola from 1987 to 1993. He studied philosophy at Saint Thomas Aquinas Major Seminary, Makurdi from 1993 to 1996 before moving to Saint Augustine’s Major Seminary, Jos where he studied Theology from 1998 to 2022. From 2007 to 2012, he studied for a doctorate degree in Theology at the Pontifical University of St. Thomas Aquino-Angelicum in Rome.

== Priestly career ==
He was ordained a priest on 17 August 2002 and incardinated at the Diocese of Maiduguri, Borno State. Bakeni served as parish priest of Saint Joseph Parish and was Director of the Catechetical Training Center in Kaya from 2002 to 2007 when he left for his doctorate studies in Theology at the Pontifical University of St. Thomas Aquino-Angelicum in Rome. Following his return to his diocese he served briefly as parish priest of Saint Joseph Parish, Gashua in 2012. In 2013, he was transferred to St. Hilary in Polo Parish as the parish priest serving concurrently as the administrator of St. Joseph Cathedral Parish and deacon of Maiduguri. He served as Secretary and Procurator of the Diocese of Maiduguri, was a member of the College of Consultors and the diocesan President of the Commission for Interreligious Dialogue. He served as chaplain of the All Saints Catholic Chaplaincy of the University of Maiduguri from 2020 to 12 April 2022 when Pope Francis appointed him bishop of Maiduguri Diocese. He was Titular Bishop of Leptimino until his episcopal ordination on 7 July 2022 by Antonio Gudo Filipazz, the Apostolic Nuncio to Nigeria.
