= Archdiocese of Kaduna =

Roman Catholic archdiocese in Nigeria

Archdiocese of Kaduna Archidioecesis Kadunaensis

Location
- Country: Nigeria
- Territory: southern portion of Kaduna State
- Ecclesiastical province: Kaduna
- Coordinates: 10°31′23″N 7°26′25″E

Statistics
- Area: 17,094 km^{2} (6,600 sq mi)
- Population: Total; Catholics: (as of 2022); 2,624,396; 655,018 (25%)
- Parishes: 71

Information
- Denomination: Roman Catholic
- Rite: Latin Rite
- Established: Diocese: June 29, 1953; Archdiocese: July 16, 1959
- Cathedral: Saint Joseph Cathedral in Kaduna
- Secular priests: 146

Current leadership
- Pope: Leo XIV
- Archbishop: Most Rev. Matthew Man-oso Ndagoso
- Suffragans: Kafanchan, Kano, Kontagora, Minna, Sokoto, Zaria

Map
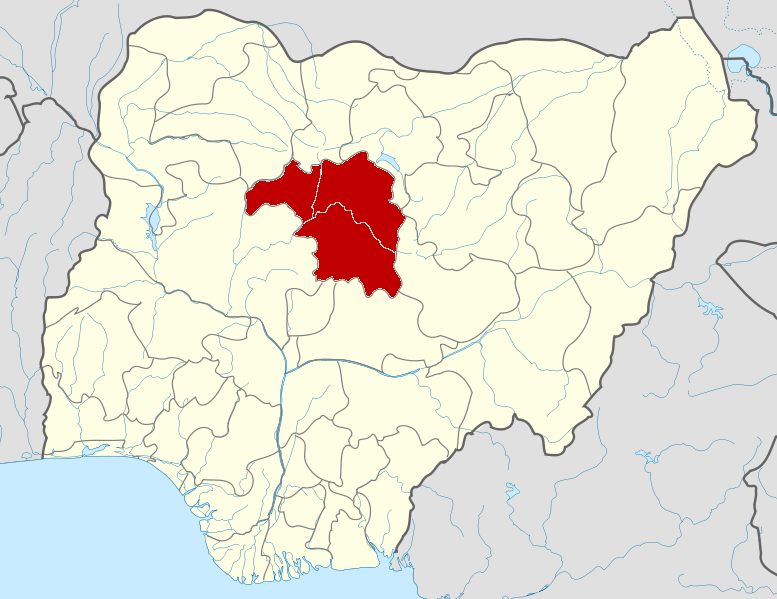
- The Archdiocese of Kaduna includes the southern portion of Kaduna State which is shown here in red.

Website
- www.KadunaEcclesia.org

The Roman Catholic Archdiocese of Kaduna (Kadunaën(sis) in Latin) is the Metropolitan See for the ecclesiastical province of Kaduna in Nigeria.

== History ==
- 1911.08.24: The Apostolic Prefecture of Eastern Nigeria was created from the Apostolic Prefecture of Upper Niger and it had Shendam as its headquarters. Kano, afterwards a principal mission station under Kaduna, was opened from Shendam but Kaduna itself was administered from Asaba (headquarters of the Prefecture of Upper Niger which subsequently became the Vicariate Apostolic of Western Nigeria.
- 1929.07.18: Renamed as Apostolic Prefecture of Northern Nigeria
- 1934.04.09: Renamed as Apostolic Prefecture of Kaduna
- 1953.06.29: Promoted as Diocese of Kaduna
- 1959.07.16: Promoted as Metropolitan Archdiocese of Kaduna

== Special churches ==
The seat of the archbishop is St. Joseph’s Cathedral in Kaduna.

== Bishops ==
- Prefect Apostolic of Eastern Nigeria (Roman rite)
  - Osvaldo Waller, S.M.A. 1912 – 1929
- Prefects Apostolic of Northern Nigeria (Roman rite)
  - Francis O' Rourke, S.M.A. 1929.05.17 - 1930.03.27, appointed (titular bishop and) Vicar Apostolic of Costa di Benin
  - William Thomas Porter, S.M.A. 1930.04.08 – 1933.04.25, appointed (titular bishop and) Vicar Apostolic of Costa d’Oro {Gold Coast}, Ghana; future Archbishop
  - Thomas Hughes, S.M.A. 1934.04.09 – 1943.01.12, appointed (titular bishop and) Vicar Apostolic of Ondo-Ilorin
  - John MacCarthy, S.M.A. 1943.05.14 – 1953.06.29 see below
- Bishop of Kaduna (Roman rite)
  - Bishop John MacCarthy, S.M.A. see above 1953.06.29 – 1959.07.16 see below
- Archbishops of Kaduna (Roman rite)
  - Archbishop John MacCarthy, S.M.A. see above 1959.07.16 – 1975.06.12
  - Archbishop Peter Yariyok Jatau 1975.04.10 - 2007.11.16
  - Archbishop Matthew Man-oso Ndagoso, appointed 2007.11.16

=== Coadjutor Archbishop ===
- Peter Yariyok Jatau (1972-1975)

=== Other priests of this diocese who became bishops ===
- Joseph Danlami Bagobiri, appointed Bishop of Kafanchan in 1995
- Matthew Hassan Kukah, appointed Bishop of Sokoto in 2011
- Julius Yakubu Kundi, appointed Bishop of Kafanchan in December 2019

== Suffragan Dioceses ==
- Kafanchan
- Kano
- Kontagora
- Minna
- Sokoto
- Zaria

== Persecution and insecurity ==
The Archdiocese of Kaduna has had several incidents of persecution, including kidnappings and murder of priests. In 2022 three priests were kidnapped at the same time, one of whom, Fr Joseph Batko, was killed. The other two, Fr Vitus Borogo and Fr Abraham Kunat were eventually released. A fourth priest, Fr John Bako Shekwolo has been missing since March 2019. Reacting to the general atmosphere of insecurity in the country, Kaduna bishop Matthew Manoso Ndagoso, said: “The political will is not there to address the issues of security in this country. The Nigerian security forces have proven they are capable, our military can do this, so that this is happening in our country shows that something has gone wrong. We have nobody else to blame but the Government. They tell us they are on top of the situation, but we think the situation is on top of them."

Regarding the murders and kidnappings of priests in Nigeria, the same bishop said, in another interview, "everybody is on edge. All of us, the clergy, the laypeople, everybody. People are afraid, and rightly so. People are traumatised, and rightly so. With this situation, nobody is safe anywhere. If you go out of your house, even in the daytime, until you come back, you are not safe”.

Speaking to Aid to the Church in Need in July 2022, Bishop Ndagoso decried the insecurity in the following words: "In the last three years, seven of my priests have been kidnapped, two have been killed, and one has been in captivity for three years and two months. Four were released. In fifty of my parishes, priests cannot stay in their rectories, because they are targets, they are seen as an easy source of money for ransom. I cannot go on pastoral visits like I usually do, priests cannot go to villages and say masses. People cannot go to farm, so they cannot feed themselves. With this insecurity people are starved of the sacraments".

In 2023 Christians in Kaduna expressed outrage when a video emerged of a former state governor openly admitting to discriminating against Christians. Nasir el-Rufai is seen claiming that "those that are not Muslims don’t vote for our party. Most of them. So, why should I give them the deputy position? I did my calculation, and I knew we could win the election without giving them the deputy governor”, adding later that "of course, Kubau [a Muslim area] voted for us the most, so I’ll add something to Kubau because they voted for us. What I’ll give Jaba [a Christian area], I’ll increase it for Kubau because Jaba didn’t vote for us."

In reaction, representatives from the Catholic Diocesan Priests Association in Kaduna, Nigeria, Zaria and Kafanchan, which are all within the borders of Kaduna state, labelled the comments a “divisive, bigoted, hateful and completely unstatesmanlike declaration of Islamic political supremacism in Kaduna State and Nigeria”

On 7 September 2023, news emerged of the kidnap of a seminarian. Ezequiel Nuhu who belongs to the diocese of Abuja, but was on holiday in Kaduna, and was abducted with his father.

In November 2025 Fr Bobbo Paschal was kidnapped. He spent two months in captivity before being released in January 2026.

== See also ==
- Roman Catholicism in Nigeria

== Sources ==
- GCatholic.org
