= Diocese of Kafanchan =

Roman Catholic diocese in Nigeria

Diocese of Kafanchan Dioecesis Kafancanus

Location
- Country: Nigeria
- Territory: southern portion of Kaduna State
- Ecclesiastical province: Kaduna
- Metropolitan: Kaduna
- Coordinates: 9°35′00″N 8°18′00″E

Statistics
- Area: 14,860 km^{2} (5,740 sq mi)
- Population: Total; Catholics: (as of 2022); 1,946,475; 403,850 (20.7%)
- Parishes: 58

Information
- Denomination: Roman Catholic
- Rite: Latin Rite
- Established: July 10, 1995
- Cathedral: Saint Peter Claver Cathedral in Kafanchan
- Secular priests: 123

Current leadership
- Pope: Leo XIV
- Bishop: Julius Yakubu Kundi

Map
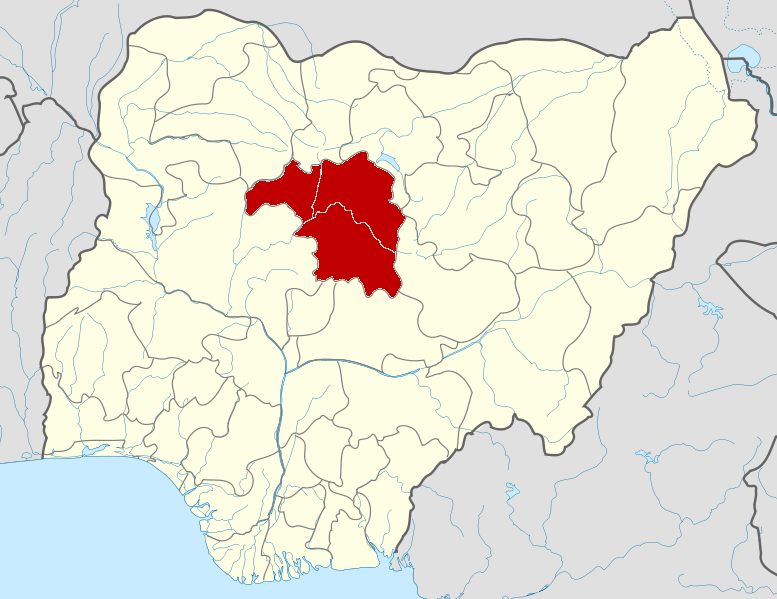
- The Diocese of Kafanchan is located in the southern portion of Kaduna State which is shown here in red.

Website
- www.CatholicDioceseofKafanchan

The Roman Catholic Diocese of Kafanchan (Latin: Kafancan(us)) is a diocese located in the city of Kafanchan in the ecclesiastical province of Kaduna in Nigeria.

== History ==
- July 10, 1995: Established as Diocese of Kafanchan from Metropolitan Archdiocese of Jos and Metropolitan Archdiocese of Kaduna

== Special churches ==
The Cathedral is St Peter Claver's Cathedral in Kafanchan.

== Leadership ==
- Bishops of Kafanchan (Roman rite)
  - Bishop Joseph Danlami Bagobiri (1995-2018)
  - Bishop Julius Kundi (2019- )

== Persecution and insecurity ==
Due to its location, the Diocese of Kafanchan has been subjected to cases of persecution or violence committed against its faithful and members of the clergy. In 2022 a priest was murdered following a kidnapping. Fr Mark Cheitnum was the communications director for the diocese and was kidnapped along with Fr Donatus Cleopas. According to Cleopas, who managed to later escape his abductors, Fr Mark was finding it difficult to keep up with the group as they were being taken into the bush, and was shot dead by his kidnappers.

Two more priests from Kafanchan diocese were kidnapped in 2022. Fr Emmanuel Silas and Fr Joseph Shekari were both eventually released.

On 7 September 2023, suspected Fulani herdsmen attacked and set fire to the rectory of St. Raphael Parish. The parish priest and his assistant were able to escape, but a seminarian, Na'aman Danlami, who was staying with them was burned to death.

On 10 May Fr Magnus John Yatai was kidnapped, but managed to escape on the same day. On 9 June 2024 Father Gabriel Ukeh was kidnapped from his parish, but was released the following day.

Fr Sylvester Okechukwu was kidnapped from his residence on 4 March 2025 and found murdered the following morning. On 24 April Fr Ibrahim Amos was kidnapped, but released on the following day.

== See also ==
- Roman Catholicism in Nigeria

== Sources ==
- GCatholic.org Information
- Catholic Hierarchy
