= Diocese of Zaria =

Catholic diocese in Nigeria

Diocese of Zaria Dioecesis Zariensis

Location
- Country: Nigeria
- Territory: portion of Kaduna State
- Ecclesiastical province: Kaduna
- Coordinates: 11°06′47″N 7°43′30″E

Statistics
- Area: 18,000 km^{2} (6,900 sq mi)
- Population: Total; Catholics: (as of 2020); 2,614,000; 53,000 (2.0%)
- Parishes: 29

Information
- Denomination: Catholic Church
- Sui iuris church: Latin Church
- Rite: Roman Rite
- Cathedral: Cathedral of Christ the King in Zaria
- Secular priests: 51

Current leadership
- Pope: Leo XIV
- Bishop: Habila Tyiakwonaboi Daboh

Map
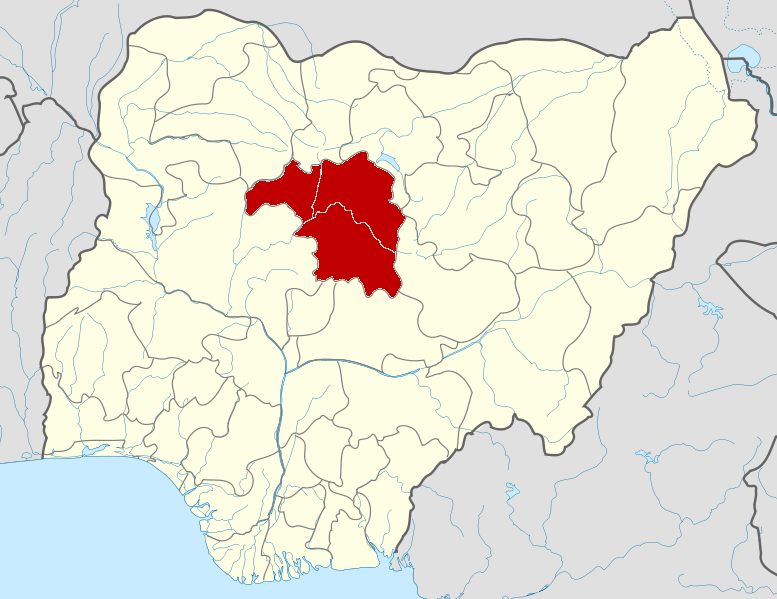
- The Diocese of Zaria is located in the northern portion of Kaduna State which is shown here in red.

Website
- www.cathdiza-ng.org Official website of the diocese

The Diocese of Zaria (Latin: Zarien(sis)) is a Latin Church ecclesiastical territory of diocese of the Catholic Church in Nigeria. The diocese's episcopal see is Zaria, Kaduna State. The Diocese of Zaria is a suffragan in the ecclesiastical province of the metropolitan Archdiocese of Kaduna in Nigeria.

== History ==
On 5 December 2000, the Diocese of Zaria was established from the Metropolitan Archdiocese of Kaduna. Bishop George Jonathan Dodo was installed as the first Bishop of Zaria Diocese by Most Reverend Osbaldo Padila, the Papal Nuncio to Nigeria

== Special churches ==
The Cathedral is Cathedral of Christ the King in Zaria.

== Leadership ==
On September 21 2023, Pope Francis appointed Rev Fr Habila Daboh, current Rector of the Good Shepherd Major Seminary Kaduna as the new Bishop of the Diocese of Zaria, Nigeria. In comments to Aid to the Church in Need, in 2025, the bishop claimed that "despite hardships", Christianity was growing "astronomically" in Northern Nigeria.

== See also ==
- Catholic Church in Nigeria
