= Stephen Dami Mamza =

Nigerian Roman Catholic bishop (born 1969)

The Most Reverend Stephen Dami Mamza
- Bishop of Yola
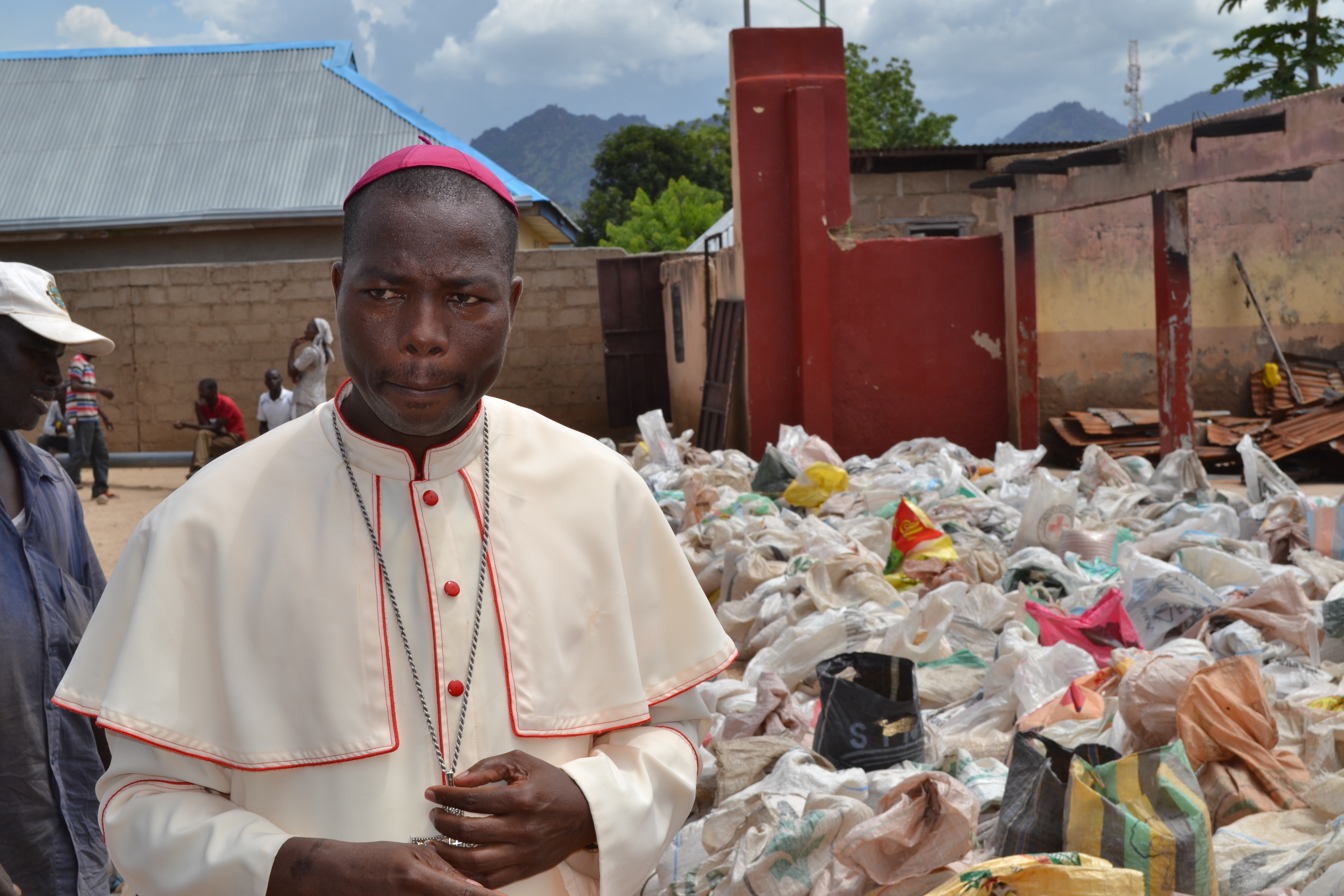
- Mamza in October 2015
- Church: Catholic Church
- Diocese: Yola
- Appointed: 18 February 2011
- Installed: 7 April 2011

Orders
- Ordination: 13 April 1996
- Consecration: 7 April 2011 by Augustine Kasujja; Charles Michael Hammawa; Oliver Dashe Doeme

Personal details
- Born: Stephen Dami Mamza; November 30, 1969 (age 56) Bazza, Adamawa State, Nigeria

Stephen Dami Mamza (born 30 November 1969) is a Nigerian Roman Catholic bishop.

Mamza was born in Bazza, Adamawa and was ordained to the priesthood on 13 April 1996. On 18 February 2011, he was appointed bishop of the Roman Catholic Diocese of Yola by Pope Benedict XVI and ordained as bishop on 7 April 2011.
