= Peter Yariyok Jatau =

Nigerian Roman Catholic archbishop (1931–2020)

- Archbishop of Kaduna
- Church: Catholic Church
- Archdiocese: Archdiocese of Kaduna
- In office: 10 April 1975 – 16 November 2007
- Predecessor: John Joseph MacCarthy
- Successor: Matthew Man-Oso Ndagoso
- Previous posts: Titular Archbishop of Velebusdus (1972-1975); Coadjutor Archbishop of Kaduna (1972-1975)

Orders
- Ordination: 7 July 1963 by John J. Reddington
- Consecration: 5 November 1972 by Amelio Poggi

Personal details
- Born: 5 August 1931 Marsa Kaje (in modern Zangon Kataf), Northern Region, Colony and Protectorate of Nigeria, British Empire
- Died: 16 December 2020 (aged 89) Kaduna, Kaduna State, Nigeria

Peter Yariyok Jatau (5 August 1931 – 16 December 2020) was a Nigerian Roman Catholic archbishop.

Jatau was born in Nigeria and was ordained to the priesthood in 1963. He served as coadjutor archbishop of the Roman Catholic Archdiocese of Kaduna, Nigeria, from 1972 to 1975 and as archbishop of the archdiocese from 1975 to 2007.
