= Joseph Bagobiri =

Nigerian Roman Catholic bishop (1957–2018)

Joseph Danlami Bagobiri
- Bishop of Kafanchan
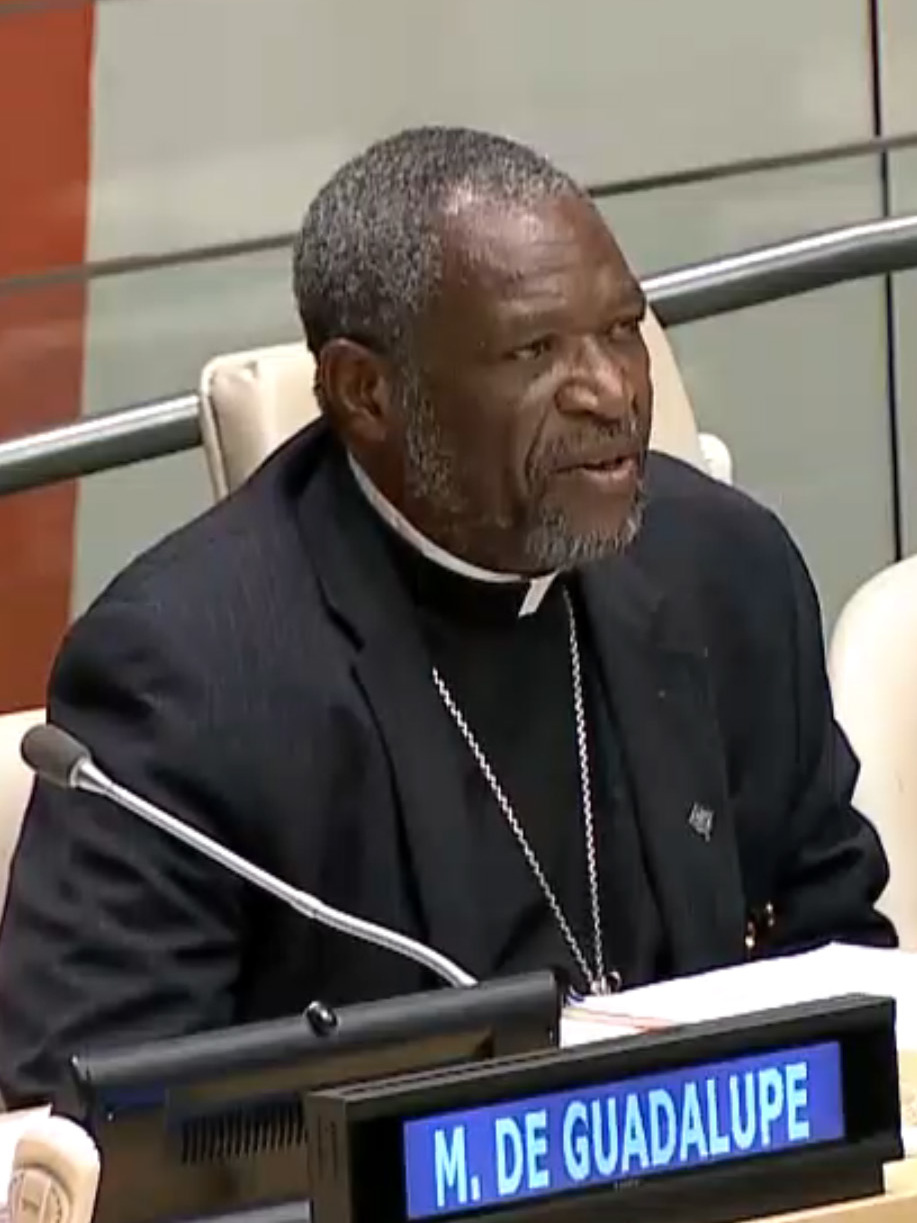
- Bagobiri in 2015
- Church: Catholic Church
- Diocese: Diocese of Kafanchan
- In office: 10 July 1995 – 27 February 2018
- Predecessor: Diocese erected
- Successor: Julius Yakubu Kundi

Orders
- Ordination: 11 June 1983
- Consecration: 21 October 1995 by Peter Yariyok Jatau

Personal details
- Born: 8 November 1957 Fadan Kagoma (southwest of Kafanchan), Zaria Province, Northern Nigeria, Federation of Nigeria, British Empire
- Died: 27 February 2018 (aged 60)

Joseph Danlami Bagobiri (8 November 1957 – 27 February 2018) was a Nigerian Roman Catholic bishop.

Ordained to the priesthood in 1983, Bagobiri served as bishop of Kafanchan from 1995 until his death in 2018.
