= Matthew Man-Oso Ndagoso =

Nigerian catholic archbishop

- Archbishop of Kaduna
- Church: Catholic Church
- Archdiocese: Archdiocese of Kaduna
- Appointed: 16 November 2007
- Predecessor: Peter Yariyok Jatau
- Previous post: Bishop of Maiduguri (2003-2007)

Orders
- Ordination: 4 October 1986
- Consecration: 1 May 2003 by Patrick Francis Sheehan

Personal details
- Born: 3 January 1960 (age 66)

Matthew Man-Oso Ndagoso (born 3 January 1960) is a Nigerian Catholic prelate who has served as the Archbishop of the Archdiocese of Kaduna since 16 November 2007. He was formerly the bishop of Maiduguri from 2003 to 2007. On 24th February 2026, he was elected the president of the Catholic Bishops' Conference of Nigeria.

== Biography ==
After studying philosophy and theology at the Pontifical University of Saint Thomas Aquinas, he was ordained a priest on 4 October 1986. He became the administrator of Cathedral of Yola and the diocese's education secretary. He became the rector of the Kaduna archdiocese major seminary. On 6 February 2003, Pope John Paul II appointed him as the bishop of the diocese of Maiduguri. He received his episcopal ordination on 1 March 2003 from Patrick Francis Sheehan of the diocese of Kano. Co-consecrators include Christopher Shaman Abba of the diocese of Yola and bishop Senan Louis O'Donnell, the diocese of Maiduguri bishop emeritus. On 16 November 2007, Pope Benedict XVI appointed him archbishop of Kaduna archdiocese. He received his pallium on 29 June 2008. He participated in the XIV Ordinary General Assembly of the Synod of Bishops in 2015 on the theme "The Vocation and Mission of the Family in the Church and in the Contemporary World".
