= Patrick Francis Sheehan =

Patrick Francis Sheehan OSA
- Bishop of Kano
- Church: Catholic Church
- Diocese: Diocese of Kano
- In office: 5 July 1996 – 20 March 2008
- Predecessor: John Francis Brown
- Successor: John Namaza Niyiring
- Previous post: Bishop of Yola (1970-1996)

Orders
- Ordination: 25 February 1956
- Consecration: 6 January 1971 by Amelio Poggi

Personal details
- Born: 28 May 1932 Boyle, County Roscommon, Irish Free State
- Died: 8 November 2012 (aged 80) Dublin, Ireland

Patrick Francis Sheehan (28 May 1932 – 8 November 2012) was the Roman Catholic bishop of the Roman Catholic Dioceses of Yola and later Kano, Nigeria.

Patrick Sheehan was born in Boyle, County Roscommon, Ireland on May 28, 1932. His parents later moved to Tramore, County Waterford. When he entered the Novitiate of the Order of St Augustine at Orlagh, near Dublin he was given the name Francis. Patrick Francis Sheehan's priestly studies were in the Gregorian University in Rome. There he was ordained priest on February 25, 1956. He was posted to the Adamawa Mission assigned to the Irish Province of the Order of St Augustine by the Holy See. There he spent most of the rest of his life. Bishop Sheehan was ordained as Bishop of Yola on January 6, 1971.

In his time as a priest of Yola, Bishop Sheehan established the Third Order of St Augustine in the diocese under the authority of the Prior General in Rome. He was instrumental in bringing the Spiritans, the De La Salle Brothers, the Sisters of the Infant Jesus, the Holy Rosary Sisters, the Mercy Sisters and the Daughters of Divine Love to the Diocese of Yola. He invited the Discalced Carmelites of New Ross, Ireland, to establish a monastery in Yola. The first nuns arrived in 1993. They chose Zing and the monastery opened in 1995.

On February 3, 1995, the Diocese of Jalingo was erected from the Diocese of Yola under the leadership of Bishop Sheehan. The De La Salle Brothers, the Holy Rosary Sisters and the Mercy Sisters have since left both jurisdictions.

On July 5, 1996, Bishop Sheehan was then transferred to Kano which was then an Apostolic Vicariate, i.e. not yet a diocese. Kano subsequently became a diocese on June 22, 1999. He retired in 2008. By then Bishop Sheehan had already returned to Ireland because of ill-health.

Bishop Patrick Francis Sheehan was found dead in his room in the Augustinian Priory of John's Lane, Dublin, on November 8, 2012. He was buried in St Patrick's Cemetery, Tramore, Co. Waterford
