= Hilary Dachelem =

Catholic bishop of Bauchi Diocese

Hilary Nanman Dachelem CMF
- Bishop of Bauchi
- Church: Catholic Church
- Diocese: Diocese of Bauchi
- Appointed: 31 May 2017
- Predecessor: Malachy John Goltok

Orders
- Ordination: 1 July 1995
- Consecration: 17 August 2017 by Ignatius Ayau Kaigama

Personal details
- Born: 3 June 1966 (age 60) Makurdi, Northern Nigeria, Republic of Nigeria

Hilary Nanman Dachelem (born 3 June 1966) is a Nigerian Catholic prelate and the bishop of Bauchi Diocese since 2017. He was ordained priest into the Claretian congregation on 1 July 1995.

== Education ==
Hilary Dachelem studied at the Claretian Institute of Philosophy, Owerri where he earned his bachelor's degree in philosophy and a bachelor's degree in theology from Spiritan International School, Enugu. He took his first Claretian vow on 8 September 1988 and his perpetual vow on 13 September 1993 before being ordained priest into the Claretian congregation on 1 July 1995.

== Career ==
Following his ordination in 1995, Dachelem served as bursar at the Claretian Institute of Philosophy from 1995 to 1999 when he was appointed provincial bursar and consulter of the CFM serving for two terms from 1999 to 2005. He served as a member of General Economic Council of CMF between 2003 and 2006. He was spirituality prefect at Claretian Institute of Philosophy from 2005 to 2009 when he was appointed as the parish priest of St. Maria Goretti, Archdiocese of Owerri serving from 2005 to 2010. He transferred to Shendam Diocese in 2010 and served concurrently as coordinator of Claretian positions in northern Nigeria and as vicar for religious and became a member of the Formation Team in Jos in 2015.

On 31 May 2017, Pope Francis appointed Dachelem bishop of Bauchi Diocese following the passing of bishop Malachy John Goltok in March 2015. Dachelem received his episcopal consecration from Archbishop Ignatius Kaigama and co-consecrators – bishop Anthony Obinna and bishop Wilfred Chipka Anagbe on 17 August 2017.
