= Philip Dung =

Catholic bishop of Shendam Diocese

Philip Davou Dung
- Bishop of Shendam
- Church: Catholic Church
- Diocese: Diocese of Shendam
- Appointed: 5 November 2016
- Predecessor: James Naanman Daman

Orders
- Ordination: 24 November 1984 by Gabriel Gonsum Ganaka
- Consecration: 11 January 2017 by Ignatius Ayau Kaigama

Personal details
- Born: 19 August 1958 (age 68) Kuru, Northern Region, Federation of Nigeria, British Empire

Philip Davou Dung (born 19 August 1958 in Kuru, Jos) is a Nigerian Catholic prelate currently serving as the bishop of Shendam Diocese. He was appointed 5 November 2016.

== Education ==
Philip Dung was born on 19 August 1958 in Kuru, Northern Region. He had his primary education at RCM Primary School Station, Wereng from 1965 to 1972. He received his religious formation at St. John Vianney Minor Seminary, Barkin Ladi between 1973 and 1977. He studied at St. Augustine Major Seminary, Jos for his bachelor's degrees in philosophy and theology. He studied at Pontifical Accademia Alfonsiana, Rome for a master's degree in moral theology between 1992 and 1994.

== Career ==
Dung was ordained on 24 November 1984. He was vocation director of the Archdiocese of Jos from 1991 to 1992 and later from 1994 to 1997. He served as dean of studies at St. Augustine Major Seminary from 1999 to 2002 and was chairman, Jos Archdiocesan Priests Council from 2003 to 2010. He became a member of Consultors in 2007 and financial administrator of Jos Archdiocese in 2010. He served as the parish priest of St. Joseph's Parish, Du, in the Archdiocese of Jos until his appointment as bishop.

On 5 November 2016, Pope Francis appointed Dung as bishop of Shendam Diocese.
