= John Moore (bishop of Bauchi) =

Bishop of the Diocese of Bauchi, Nigeria

John Francis Moore SMA
- Bishop of Bauchi
- Church: Catholic Church
- Diocese: Diocese of Bauchi
- In office: 5 July 1996 – 20 January 2010
- Predecessor: Diocese erected
- Successor: Malachy John Goltok
- Previous post: Titular Bishop of Gigthi (1996-2003)

Orders
- Ordination: 20 December 1965
- Consecration: 7 November 1996 by Gabriel Gonsum Ganaka

Personal details
- Born: 12 January 1942 Dublin, Republic of Ireland
- Died: 20 January 2010 (aged 68) Dublin, Republic of Ireland

John Francis Moore, SMA (12 January 1942 in Dublin, Ireland – 20 January 2010) was the Bishop of the Diocese of Bauchi, Nigeria. He was ordained a priest on 20 December 1965 for the Society of African Missions.

Bishop Moore was born on 12 January 1942 in the parish of Harold's Cross, Dublin, in the Archdiocese of Dublin, the second son of John and Mary Moore (née Broughal). He was educated at the Christian Brothers Secondary School, Synge Street, Dublin from 1955 to 1959. In 1960 he became a member of the SMA. From 1960 to 1966 he studied Philosophy and Theology at the SMA Major seminary at Dromantine House, Newry, Co Down. Right Reverend Eugene Doherty, Bishop of Dromore, ordained him to the priesthood on 20 December 1965 in St Colman's Cathedral, Newry.

On 5 July 1996 he was appointed Vicar Apostolic of Bauchi and Titular Bishop of Gigthi, and ordained on 7 November 1996 by Bishop Gabriel Ganaka.
