= Djerba-Zarzis Roman Causeway Bridge =

Road in Tunisia

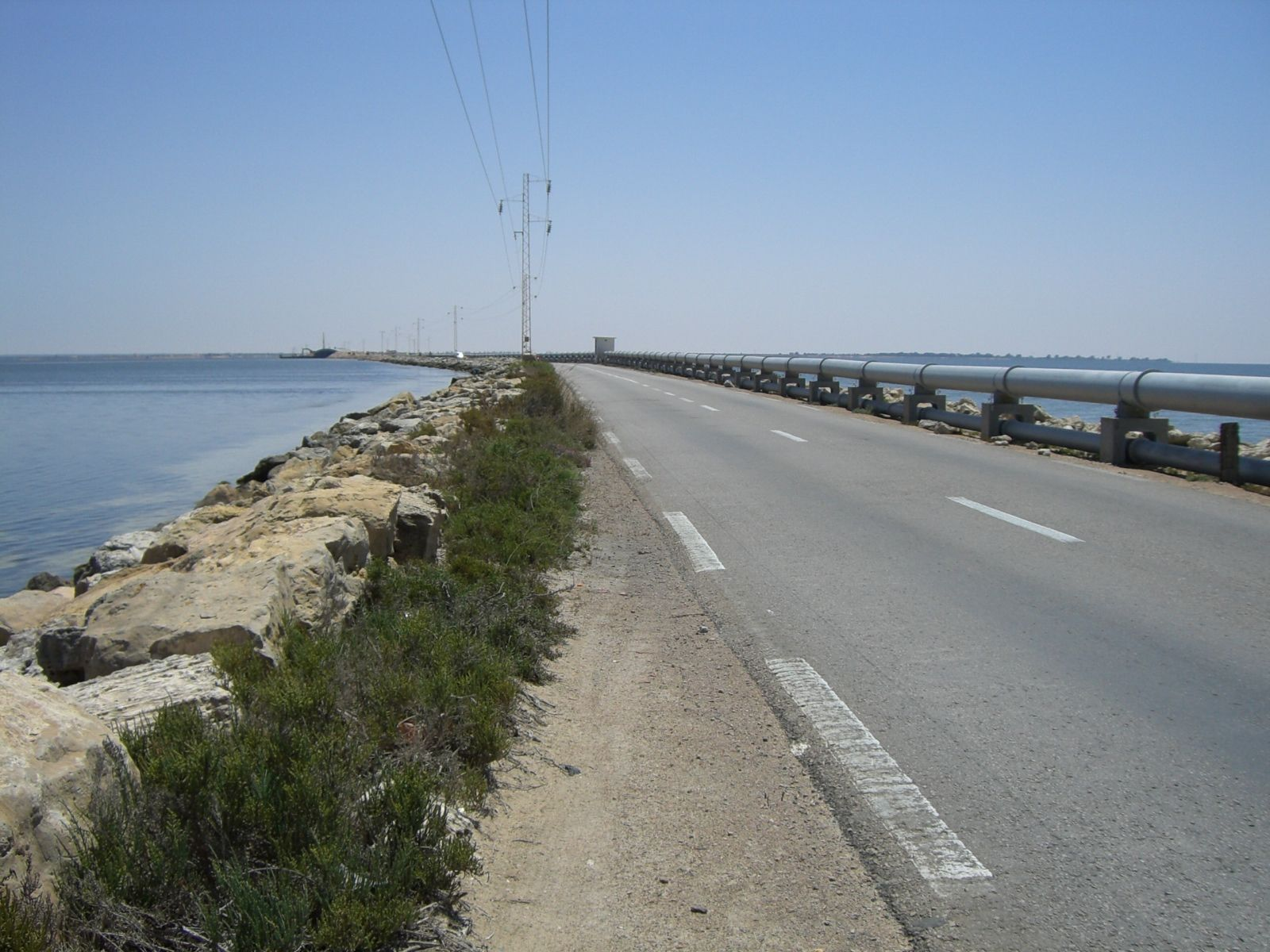
View of the road in 2006

The Djerba-Zarzis roman causeway bridge is a 7.5 kilometer road, constructed by the Romans in the late 2nd century linking Zarzis to the island Djerba at the town El Kantara.

== History ==
=== Ancient Period ===
The road was built under the Roman Empire at the end of the 2nd century, probably on the remains of an ancient Punic causeway. which was seven kilometers long It connected ancient Meninx (Djerba) to Pons (or Ponte) Zitha on the mainland.

Over the following centuries, a ford, called the « camel road », was built to the west, connecting Djerba at the tip of the Ras Terbella peninsula, leading to the frequent abandonment of the causeway.

=== Battleground from the Hafsids to the Ottomans ===
In 1432, the Roman road was restored under the reign of the Hafside Sultan Abû Fâris `Abd al-`Azîz al-Mutawakkil, before the 1432 expedition, led by Alphonso V. It was damaged during the battle against Alphonso V, but was restored by the Sultan after his victory. It seems however that the Djerbians dismantled the causeway shortly afterwards - the records indicate that it was rebuilt at the end of the reign of Caliph Abu Amr Uthman (1435-1488) and broken again by the inhabitants of the island upon his death :

After the death of King Hutmen, his successors, lacking authority, demanded their freedom, and the people immediately cut the bridge connecting the island to the mainland, fearing the arrival of troops by land.

— Leo Africanus

In 1550, the island served as a base of operations for the famous corsair Dragut against the Spanish. In early April 1551 the Spanish army and its allies began a blockade of the island. To escape Giovanni Andrea Doria's fleet, Dragut had a channel dug on the side of the shallow Gulf of Boughrara towards El Kantara, cut the causeway and allowed his fleet to escape to the open sea on 20 April 1551 heading for Tripoli, which he captured in August 1551.

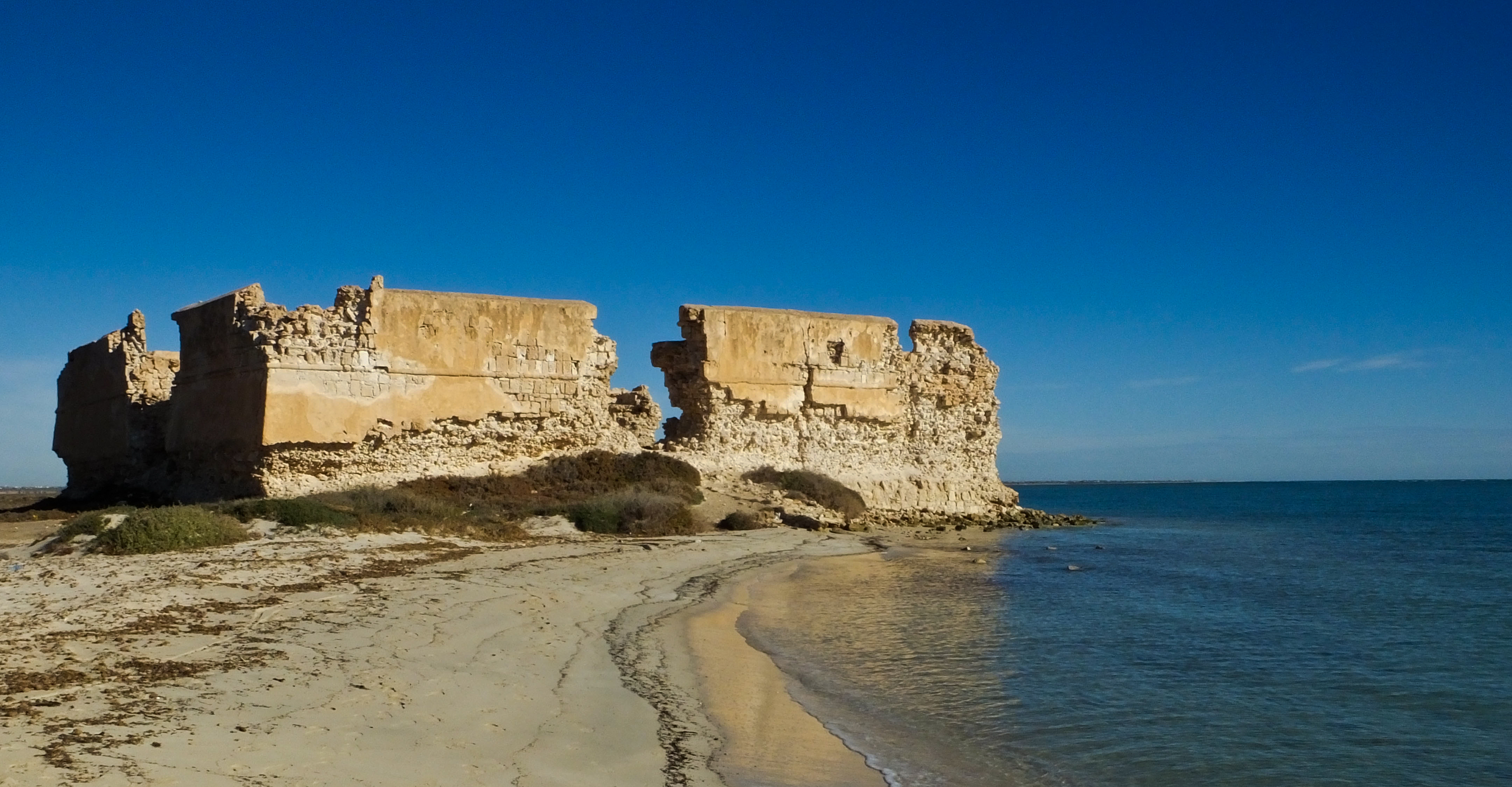
Ruins of Borj El Kastil

In medieval times, two fortifications defended the Roman road : the Borj El Bab in the middle and Borj El Kantara on the Djerba side. Borj El Agreb or Borj Trig Ejmél (the fort of the camel route), is located on the caravan ford, and Borj El Kastil occupies, to the east, the end of the sandy peninsula of the same name.

=== Modern Day ===
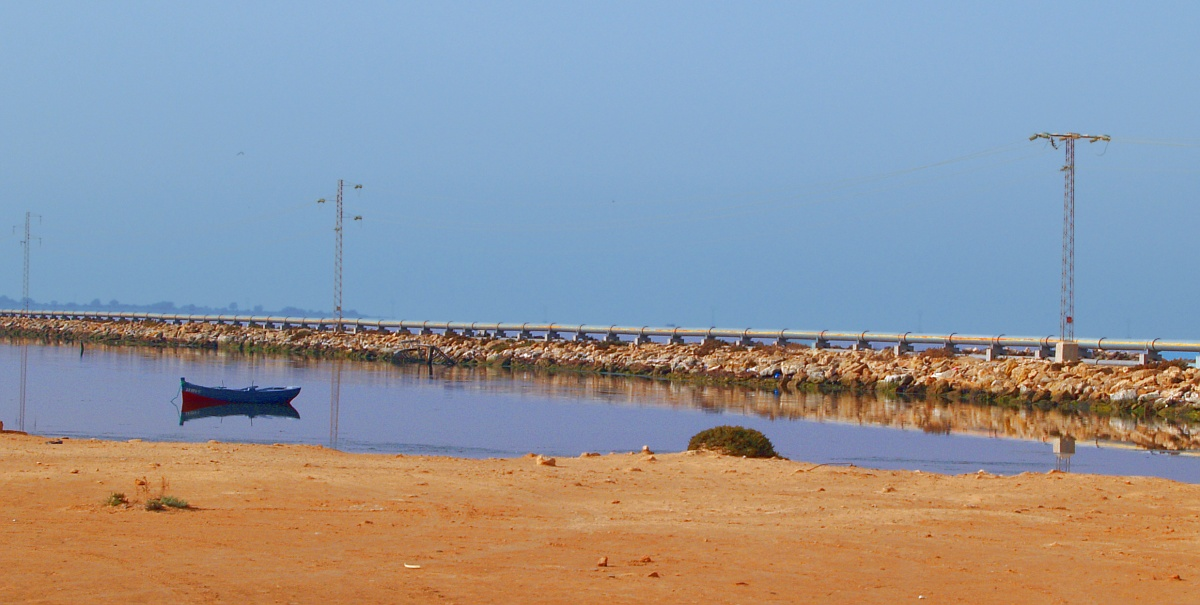
The roadway

European travellers such as Heinrich Barth in 1850 or Alphonse Rousseau in 1851, reported the presence of ruins of the ancient bridge of Pons Zita or later defensive works of the Borj El Bab.

The restoration of the ancient causeway was undertaken in 1951-1952. In 2006, a 160 meter long reinforced concrete bridge was built to replace the 1952 bridge which was only 13.7 meters long. Unlike the old causeway the new elevated bridge allows the passage of water, fish and ships. In 2021, a second bridge was built alongside it to allow for the widening of what is now Regional Road 117.
