= Wādī Bertema =

Coordinates: 33.53331°N 10.68331°E

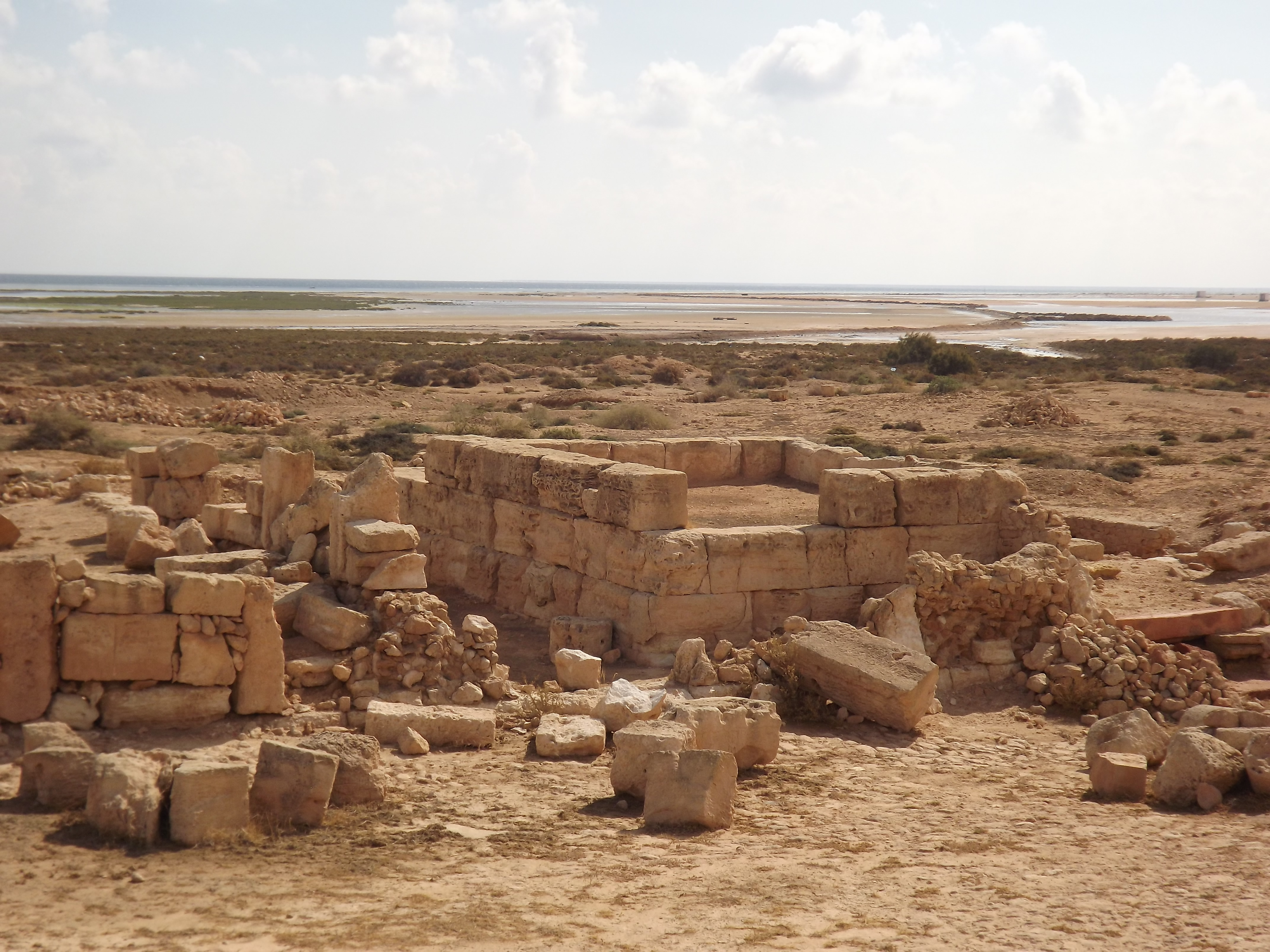
Wādī Bertema in background

Wādī Bertema is a wadi located at Latitude: 33°31'59.98" and Longitude: 10°40'59.99" in Madanīn, Tunisia. The river flows from Metameur to Boughrara on the gulf of Tunis, and being a coastal waterway the elevation above sea level is 1 meter.

The ruins of the Roman town of Gigthi are close by.

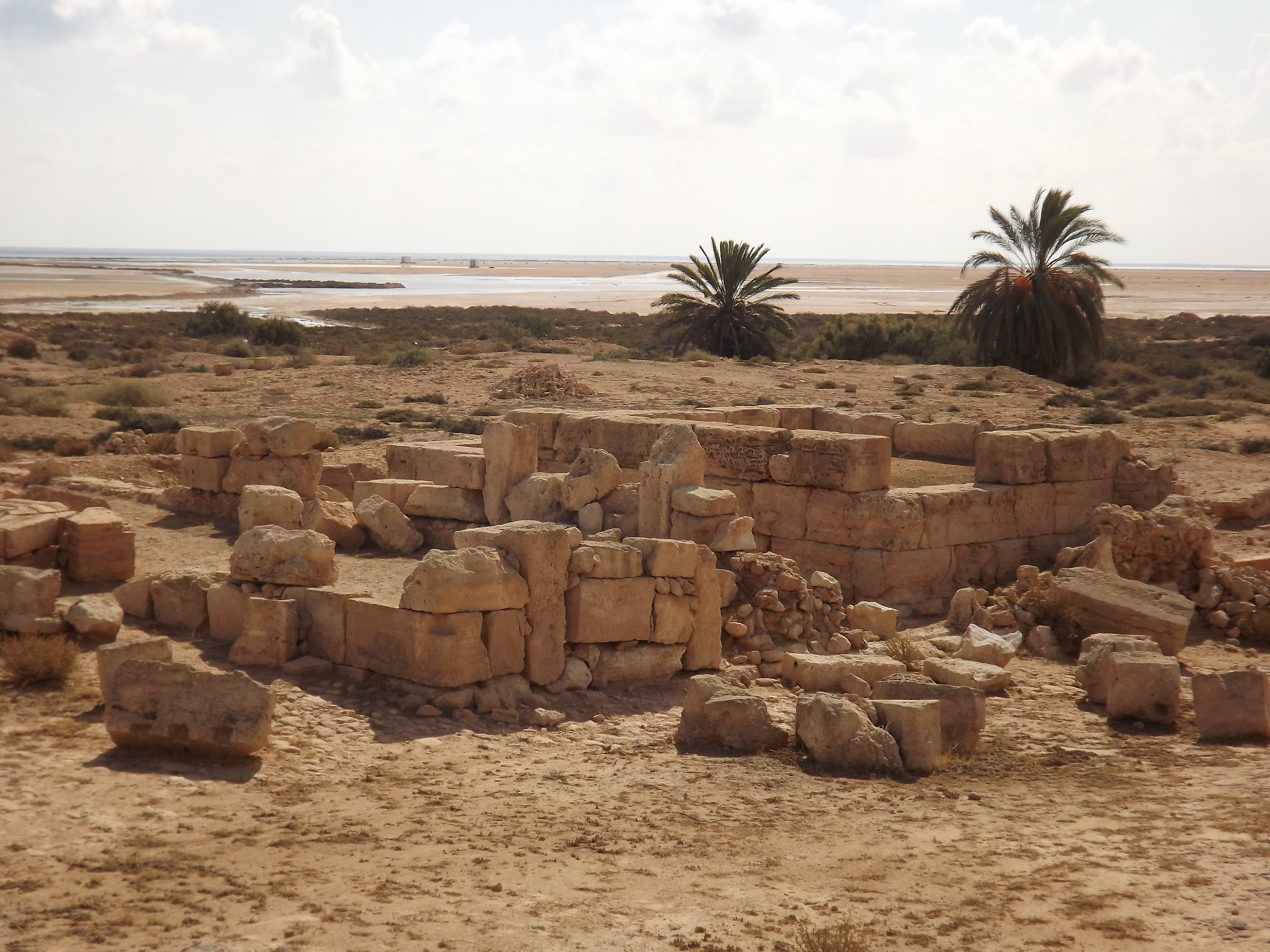
Wādī Bertema in background

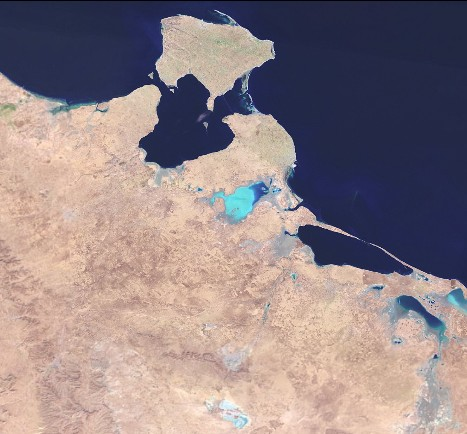
satellite Image of Wādī Bertema area
