= Diocese of Wukari =

Roman Catholic diocese in Nigeria

Coordinates: 7.8756°N 9.7722°E

Diocese of Wukari Dioecesis Vucariensis

Location
- Country: Nigeria
- Ecclesiastical province: Province of Jos
- Metropolitan: Jos

Statistics
- Area: 32,135 km^{2} (12,407 sq mi)
- Population: Total; Catholics: (as of 2022); 1,395,901; 202,245 (14.5%)
- Parishes: 25

Information
- Denomination: Roman Catholic
- Rite: Roman Rite
- Established: December 14, 2022; 3 years ago
- Cathedral: Saint Mary Cathedral in Wukari
- Secular priests: 53

Current leadership
- Pope: Leo XIV
- Bishop: Mark Maigida Nzukwein

The Roman Catholic Diocese of Wukari (Latin: Vukarien(sis)) is a diocese of the Roman Catholic Church in Nigeria.

== History ==
- 14 December 2022: the diocese was established from the Diocese of Jalingo.

== See also ==
- Roman Catholicism in Nigeria
