= Mark Maigida Nzukwein =

Nigerian Catholic prelate

Mark Maigida Nzukwein (born 15 July 1969) is a Nigerian Catholic prelate who has served as the bishop of the Diocese of Wukari since 2013.

== Biography ==
Nzukwein was born on 15 July 1969 in Jenuwa Nyifiye, Jalingo. He had his education in philosophy at St. Thomas Aquinas Major Seminary in Makurdi from 1987 to 1990 and his theological education at St. Augustine's Major Seminary in Jos from 1991 to 1995. He was ordained a priest on 15 July 1995 for the Diocese of Jalingo. He has served in various positions including Vicar General of St. Augustine Cathedral, Jos from 1995 to 1998, Diocesan Chaplain for Youth from 1996 to 1997, secretary to the Bishop and diocesan director of the Pontifical Mission Societies from 1996 to 1998, parish priest of St. John parish in Mutum-Biyu from 1998 to 1999. He further obtained his Licentiate in Catechesis and Youth Pedagogy at the Pontifical Salesian University in Rome, Italy from 1999 to 2002. He became the Rector of the Sacred Heart Minor Seminary in Jalingo from 2002 to 2016. During that time, he became the Vicar General from 2008 to 2016. I. 2013, he was the course for formators of Major Seminaries at the Pontifical Athenaeum Regina Apostolorum in Rome. He served as Rector of St. Augustine's Major Seminary in Jos from 2016 until his episcopal appointment by Pope Francis in 2022. On 13 April 2023, he was consecrated as the first bishop of the Diocese of Wukari.
