= Diocese of Lafia =

Roman Catholic diocese in Nigeria

Diocese of Lafia Dioecesis Lafiensis

Location
- Country: Nigeria
- Territory: Nasarawa State
- Ecclesiastical province: Abuja
- Metropolitan: Abuja
- Coordinates: 8°29′30″N 8°31′00″E

Statistics
- Area: 28,000 km^{2} (11,000 sq mi)
- Population: Total; Catholics: (as of 2022); 2,886,000; 330,135 (11.4%)
- Parishes: 23

Information
- Denomination: Roman Catholic
- Rite: Latin Rite
- Cathedral: Saint William Cathedral in Lafia
- Secular priests: 91

Current leadership
- Pope: Leo XIV
- Bishop: David Ajang

Map
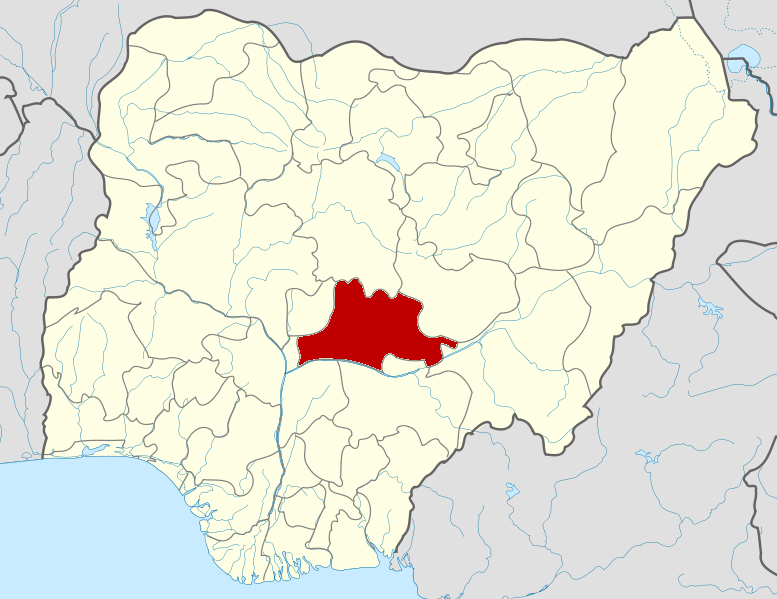
- The Diocese of Lafia is located in Nasarawa State which is shown here in red.

The Roman Catholic Diocese of Lafia (Latin: Lafien(sis)) is a diocese located in the city of Lafia in the ecclesiastical province of Abuja in Nigeria.

== History ==
- December 5, 2000: Established as Diocese of Lafia from the Metropolitan Archdiocese of Jos and the Diocese of Makurdi

== Special churches ==
The Cathedral is St. William's Cathedral in Lafia.

== Leadership ==
- Bishops of Lafia (Roman rite)
  - Bishop Matthew Ishaya Audu (December 5, 2000 - January 6, 2020), appointed Archbishop of Jos
  - Bishop David Ajang (March 31, 2021 – present)

== See also ==
- Roman Catholicism in Nigeria

== Sources ==
- GCatholic.org Information
- Catholic Hierarchy
