= John J. Reddington =

Irish clergyman and bishop

John Joseph Reddington SMA
- Bishop of Jos
- Church: Catholic Church
- Diocese: Diocese of Jos
- In office: 10 April 1954 – 3 July 1974
- Predecessor: William Lumley
- Successor: Gabriel Gonsum Ganaka

Orders
- Ordination: 10 June 1934 by Edward Mulhern
- Consecration: 29 June 1954 by Joseph Walsh

Personal details
- Born: 26 June 1910 Curraghboy, County Roscommon, United Kingdom of Great Britain and Ireland
- Died: 3 October 1994 (aged 84) Raheny, Dublin, Republic of Ireland

John Joseph Reddington (born 1910 in Curraghboy) was an Irish clergyman and bishop for the Roman Catholic Diocese of Jos.

Reddington was received as a member of the Society of African Missions on 2 July 1930 and ordained a priest in St. Colman's Cathedral, Newry, by Bishop Edward Mulhern of Dromore diocese, on 10 June 1934.

He was appointed Bishop of Jos in 1954, a post he resigned in 1974.

From November 1974 until June 1975 Reddington was the chaplain at St. Bernard's Priory, Warton, in England. In December 1975, suffering from diabetes, he retired to the Sacred Heart nursing home in Raheny, Dublin, where he died in 1994.
