= Roman Catholic Diocese of Pankshin =

Roman Catholic diocese in Nigeria

Diocese of Pankshin Dioecesis Pankshinensis
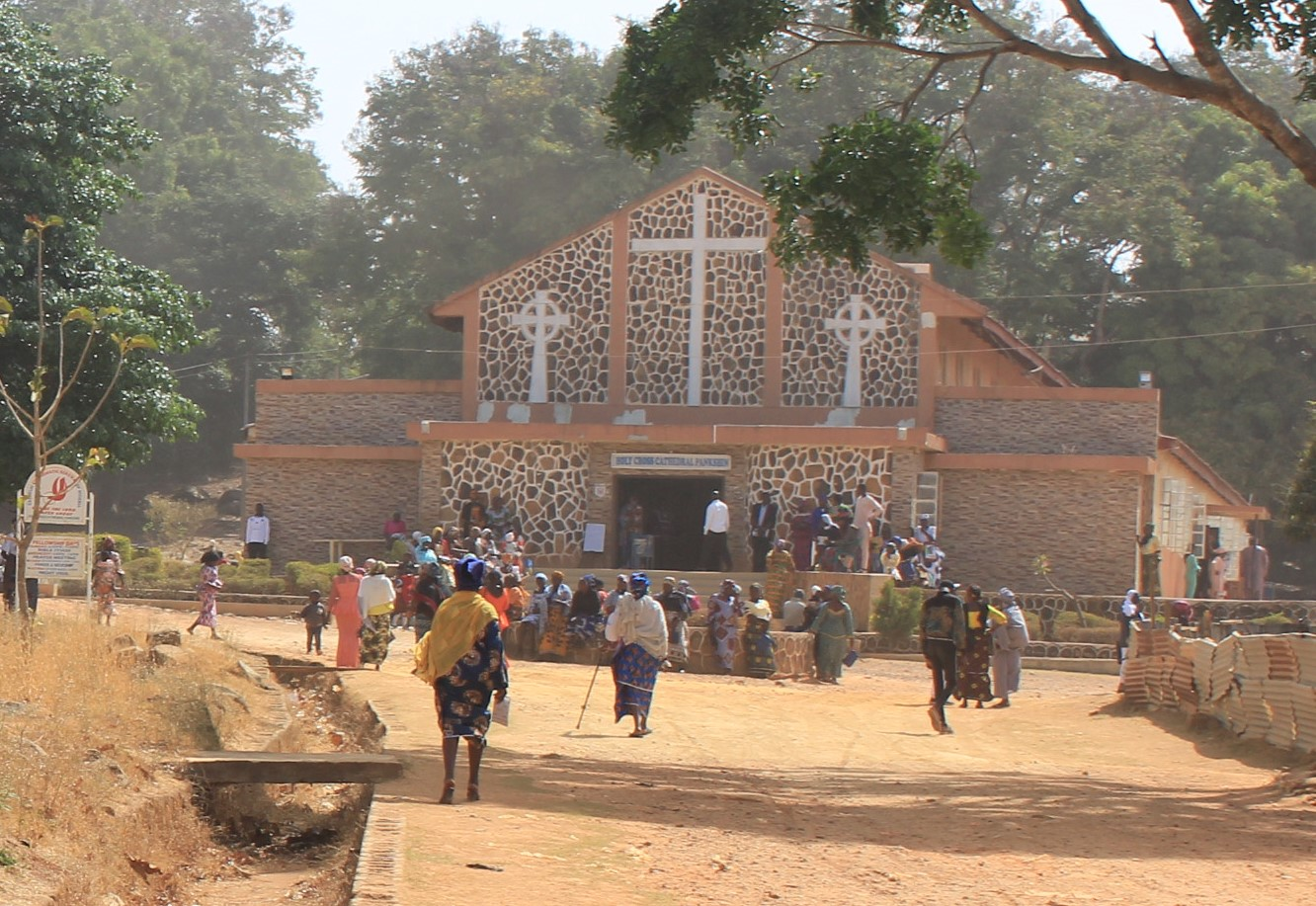

Location
- Country: Nigeria
- Ecclesiastical province: Jos
- Metropolitan: Jos

Statistics
- Area: 8,486 km^{2} (3,276 sq mi)
- Population: Total; Catholics: (as of 2022); 1,233,590; 222,530 (18.0%)
- Parishes: 36

Information
- Sui iuris church: Latin Church
- Rite: Roman Rite
- Established: March 18, 2014
- Cathedral: Cathedral of the Holy Cross
- Secular priests: 49

Current leadership
- Pope: Leo XIV
- Bishop: Michael Gobal Gokum

The Roman Catholic Diocese of Pankshin (Latin: Pankshinen(sis)) is a diocese located in the city of Pankshin in the ecclesiastical province of Jos in Nigeria.

== History ==
On March 18, 2014 the Diocese of Pankshin was established from territory of the Archdiocese of Jos and the Diocese of Shendam.

== Ordinaries ==
- Michael Gobal Gokum (consecrated 12 Jun 2014–present)

== See also ==
- Roman Catholicism in Nigeria
