= Matthew Ishaya Audu =

Nigerian Catholic archbishop (b. 1959)

Archbishop of Jos Matthew Ishaya
- Church: Catholic Church
- Previous post: Bishop of Lafia

Orders
- Ordination: 23 June 1984
- Consecration: by Archbishop Osvaldo Padilla

Personal details
- Born: Matthew Ishaya Audu; 7 June 1959 (age 67) nassarawa state, Nigeria
- Denomination: Catholic
- Residence: Archdiocese of Jos
- Occupation: catholic clergy
- Education: Pontifical Lateran University
- Motto: Ikon Allah

Matthew Ishaya Audu (born 1959 in Rafin Pa) is a Nigerian prelate of the Catholic Church who has served as Archbishop of Jos since 2020. He was appointed Bishop of the Roman Catholic Diocese of Lafia in 2000. He was appointed archbishop of the Roman Catholic Archdiocese of Jos in 2020.

== Early life and education ==
Audu was born in 1959. He attended St. James Minor Seminary in Keffi, then completed his philosophical and theological studies at the St Augustine Major Seminary in Jos.

== Career in the Catholic church ==
Audu was ordained a Catholic priest of Makurdi diocese in June, 1984. He served as assistant parish priest in Keffi (1984–86); assistant parish priest in Lafia (1986–88); parish priest of Nasarawa (1988–89); studied Moral Theology in Rome at the Institute of Moral Theology of the Pontifical Lateran University, Licentiate (1989–91); and Professor of Moral Theology and Vice-Rector of the Major Seminary of St Thomas Aquinas, Makurdi (1992–97). He studied for his Degree in Moral Theology at the Alfonsianum in Rome (1997–99). From June to December 2000, he was Acting Rector of the Major Seminary of St Thomas Aquinas, Makurdi. On 5 December 2000, Pope John Paul II appointed him, bishop elect of the newly created Lafia diocese. On 31 March 2001, he was ordained as bishop of Lafia. On 6 January 2020, Pope Francis appointed him as archbishop of Jos, succeeding Ignatius Kaigama.

Catholic Church titles
Preceded by	Bishop of Lafia; 2000–2020	Succeeded by David Ajang
