= Diocese of Bauchi =

Roman Catholic diocese in Nigeria

Diocese of Bauchi Dioecesis Bauchianus

Location
- Country: Nigeria
- Territory: Bauchi State
- Ecclesiastical province: Jos
- Metropolitan: Jos
- Coordinates: 10°18′57″N 09°50′39″E

Statistics
- Area: 66,102 km^{2} (25,522 sq mi)
- Population: Total; Catholics: (as of 2022); 8,636,000; 101,000 (1.2%)
- Parishes: 35

Information
- Denomination: Catholic Church
- Sui iuris church: Latin Church
- Rite: Roman Rite
- Established: December 31, 2003
- Cathedral: Cathedral of Saint John the Evangelist in Bauchi
- Secular priests: 41

Current leadership
- Pope: Leo XIV
- Bishop: Hilary Nanman Dachelem, CMF

Map
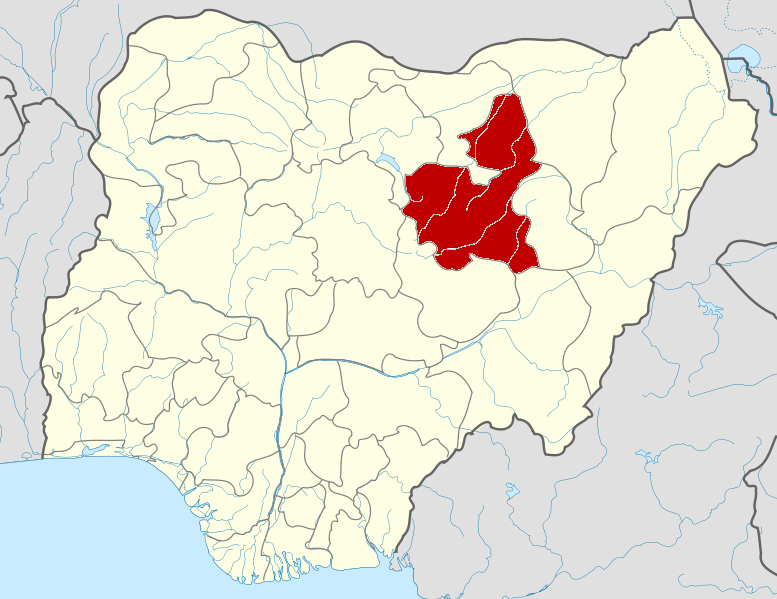
- Bauchi State is shown in red.

Website
- www.bauchidiocese.org

The Diocese of Bauchi (Latin: Bauchian(us)) is a Latin Church ecclesiastical territory or diocese of the Catholic Church in Northern Nigeria. It is a suffragan diocese in the ecclesiastical province of the metropolitan Archdiocese of Jos in, yet depends on the missionary Roman Congregation for the Evangelization of Peoples.

Its cathedral is the Cathedral of St. John Evangelist, located in the episcopal see of Bauchi in Bauchi State.

== History ==
- Established on 5 July 1996 as Apostolic Vicariate of Bauchi, on territory split off from its Metropolitan, the Archdiocese of Jos
- Promoted on 31 December 2003 as Diocese of Bauchi/ Bauchian(us) (Latin adjective)

== Statistics ==
As of 2014, it pastorally served 79,000 Catholics (1.2% of 6,742,000 total) on 66,102 km^{2} in 23 parishes and 1 mission with 39 priests (34 diocesan, 5 religious), 18 lay religious (9 brothers, 9 sisters) and 13 seminarians.

== Episcopal ordinaries ==
Apostolic Vicar of Bauchi

- John Moore, Society of African Missions (S.M.A.) (born Ireland) (5 July 1996 – 31 December 2003 see below), Titular Bishop of Gigthi (1996.07.05 – 2003.12.12)

Suffragan Bishops of Bauchi

- John Moore, S.M.A. (see above December 31, 2003 — death 20 January 2010)
- Malachy John Goltok (18 March 2011 – death 21 March 2015)
- Bishop-elect Hilary Nanman Dachelem, Claretians (C.M.F.) (31 May 2017 – ...), no previous prelature.

== See also ==
- List of Catholic dioceses in Nigeria
- Roman Catholicism in Nigeria

== Sources and external links ==
- GCatholic.org - data for all sections
- Official website of the Diocese of Bauchi
- Catholic Hierarchy
