= Roman Catholic Archdiocese of Jos =

Roman Catholic archdiocese in Nigeria

Archdiocese of Jos Archidioecesis Iosensis

Location
- Country: Nigeria
- Territory: Plateau State
- Ecclesiastical province: Jos
- Coordinates: 9°55′59.9″N 8°52′59.9″E

Statistics
- Area: 4,769 km^{2} (1,841 sq mi)
- Population: Total; Catholics: (as of 2022); 1,935,786; 424,359 (21.9%)
- Parishes: 66

Information
- Denomination: Roman Catholic
- Rite: Latin Rite
- Established: Diocese: 29 June 1953; Archdiocese: 26 March 1994
- Cathedral: Cathedral of Our Lady of Fatima
- Secular priests: 110

Current leadership
- Pope: Leo XIV
- Archbishop: Most Rev. Matthew Ishaya Audu
- Suffragans: Bauchi, Jalingo, Maiduguri, Pankshin, Shendam, Yola

Map
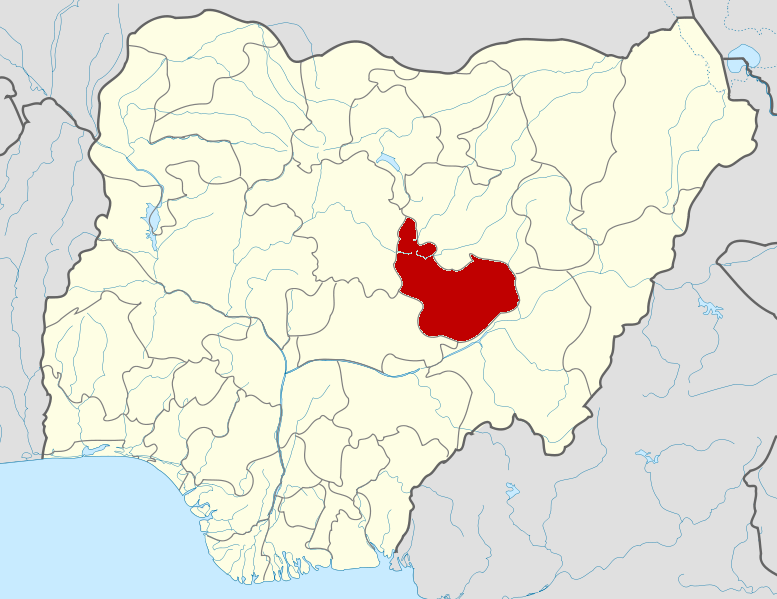
- Plateau State shown in red

Website
- josarchdiocese.org

The Roman Catholic Archdiocese of Jos (Archidioecesis Iosensis (Latin) is the Metropolitan See for the ecclesiastical province of Jos in Nigeria.

== History ==
- 1934.04.09: Established as Apostolic Prefecture of Jos from the Apostolic Prefecture of Northern Nigeria
- 1953.06.29: Promoted as Diocese of Jos
- 1994.03.26: Promoted as Metropolitan Archdiocese of Jos

== Special churches ==
The seat of the archbishop is Cathedral of Our Lady of Fatima in Jos.

== Bishops ==
- Prefects Apostolic of Jos (Roman rite)
  - Fr. Guglielmo Lumley, S.M.A. 1934.06.22 – 1953
- Bishops of Jos (Roman rite)
  - Bishop John J. Reddington, S.M.A. 1954.04.10 – 1974.07.03
  - Bishop Gabriel Gonsum Ganaka 1974.10.05 – 1994.03.26 see below
- Metropolitan Archbishops of Jos (Roman rite)
  - Archbishop Gabriel Gonsum Ganaka see above 1994.03.26 – 1999.11.11
  - Archbishop Ignatius Ayau Kaigama 2000.04.14 - 2019.03.11; as President of the Nigerian Bishops, he has criticized the government for its failure to adequately protect Christians and other religious minorities from Islamist fundamentalist terrorists, such as Boko Haram
  - Archbishop Matthew Ishaya Audu since 2020.01.06

=== Auxiliary Bishop ===
- Gabriel Gonsum Ganaka (1973–1974), appointed Bishop here

=== Other priests of this diocese who became bishops ===
- Kevin Joseph Aje, appointed Coadjutor Bishop of Sokoto in 1982
- Oliver Dashe Doeme (priest here, 1997–2007), appointed Bishop of Maiduguri in 2009
- Philip Davou Dung, appointed Bishop of Shendam in 2016
- Michael Gobal Gokum, appointed Bishop of Pankshim in 2014
- Malachy John Goltok, appointed Bishop of Bauchi in 2011

== Suffragan dioceses ==
- Bauchi
- Jalingo
- Maiduguri
- Pankshin
- Shendam
- Yola
- Wukari

== See also ==
- Roman Catholicism in Nigeria
