= Michael Gokum =

Catholic bishop of Pankshin Diocese, Nigeria

The Most Reverend Michael Gokum
- Bishop of Pankshin
- Archdiocese: Pankshin Diocese
- Province: Jos
- Appointed: 18 March 2014
- Installed: 12 June 2014

Personal details
- Born: Michael Gobal Gokum; 18 February 1964 Kadyis, Pankshin, Plateau State
- Denomination: Roman Catholic

Styles of Michael Gobal Gokum
- Reference style: The Most Reverend
- Spoken style: Your Lordship
- Religious style: Bishop

Michael Gobal Gokum (born 18 February 1964) is a Nigerian Catholic prelate who is the Bishop of Pankshin Diocese, a suffragan of the Archdiocese of Jos since 2014. Before his appointment as first bishop of Pankshin Diocese, he served as administrator of Our Lady Queen of Nigeria Pro-Cathedral of the Archdiocese of Abuja.

== Education ==
Michael Gokum was in 1964 in Kadyis, Pankshin in Plateau State. He studied at St. Augustine Major Seminary, Jos where he earned bachelor's degrees in philosophy and theology between 1978 and 1991.

== Priestly career ==
Gokum was ordained on 16 November 1991 at Our Lady of Fatima Cathedral, Jos. From 1991 to 1994, he worked at St. Mary's Tafawa Balewa in Bauchi before being transferred to Archdiocese of Abuja as fidei donum priest on the request of Archbishop John Onaiyekan in 1995. He served as Parish priest of St. Theresa, Bwari from 1995 to 1996 when he was transferred to Murumba Parish, Igu, Abuja as parish priest serving until 2002. During this period, he was President of the catechetical Commission of the Archdiocese of Abuja and Chaplain of the Catholic Women Organisation (CWO). Gokum studied for a Licentiate in Ecumenism at University of St. Thomas Aquinas, Rome between 2002 and 2004. He served as parish priest of Immaculate Conception parish from 2005 to 2006 when he was transferred to Sts. Peter and Paul parish, Nyanya where he served until 2012. He was appointed the administrator of Our Lady Queen of Nigeria Pro Cathedral, Abuja in 2012 and was Dean of the Garki Deanery, Director of catechism and Chaplain of the diocesan your organisation.

On 18 March 2014, Pope Francis appointed Gokum as the Bishop of the newly created Diocese of Pankshin. On 12 June 2014, he received his episcopal consecration from Cardinal John Onaiyekan.
