= Malachy John Goltok =

Nigerian bishop (1965–2015)

- Bishop of Bauchi
- Church: Catholic Church
- Diocese: Diocese of Bauchi
- In office: 18 March 2011 – 21 March 2015
- Predecessor: John Moore
- Successor: Hilary Dachelem

Orders
- Ordination: 4 November 1990 by Gabriel Gonsum Ganaka
- Consecration: 19 May 2011 by Keith O'Brien

Personal details
- Born: 12 July 1965 Bauchi, Northern Nigeria, Federal Republic of Nigeria
- Died: 21 March 2015 (aged 49) Jos, Plateau State, Nigeria

Malachy John Goltok (12 July 1965 in Bauchi – 21 March 2015 in Jos) was a Nigerian bishop. He was bishop of the Roman Catholic Diocese of Bauchi, Nigeria. He was ordained a priest by Bishop of Jos, Gabriel Gonsum Ganaka on 4 November 1990 and appointed as second Bishop of Bauchi on 18 March 2011 by Pope Benedict XVI. He died 21 March 2015 after a short serious illness.
