= James Naanman Daman =

James Naanman Daman O.S.A.
- Bishop of Shendam
- Church: Catholic Church
- Diocese: Diocese of Shendam
- In office: 2 June 2007 – 12 January 2015
- Predecessor: Diocese erected
- Successor: Philip Dung
- Previous post: Bishop of Jalingo (2000-2007)

Orders
- Ordination: 14 February 1982 by Pope John Paul II
- Consecration: 24 February 2001 by Osvaldo Padilla

Personal details
- Born: 10 April 1956
- Died: 12 January 2015 (aged 58)

James Naanman Daman (10 April 1956 – 12 January 2015) was a Roman Catholic bishop.

James Naanman Daman was born on 10 April 1956, in Miket, Nigeria. Other sources say he was born in Kwa, Nigeria. He was ordained to the priesthood in 1982 by Pope John Paul II. Daman was named bishop of the Diocese of Jalingo, Nigeria, in 2000 and was named the first bishop of the Diocese of Shendam in 2007. He died in his sleep in his residence on 12 January 2015.
