= David Ajang =

Nigerian prelate

The Bishop David Ajang
- Church: Roman Catholic Church
- Previous post: priest

Orders
- Ordination: 3 December 1994

Personal details
- Born: David Ajang; 31 March 1970 (age 56) Zaria, Nigeria
- Denomination: Catholic (Roman Rite)
- Education: Catholic University of Toulouse

David Ajang (born 1970 in Zaria) is a Nigerian prelate of the Catholic Church who serves as bishop of the Roman Catholic Diocese of Lafia. He was appointed bishop in 2021.

== Biography ==
Born in 1970, from 1982 David Ajang attended the Saint John Vianney Minor Seminary in Barkin Ladi, and from 1987 to 1990 he studied philosophy at Saint Thomas Aquinas Major Seminary in Makurdi and from 1990 to 1994 Catholic theology at Saint Augustine's Major Seminary in Jos. On December 3, 1994, he was ordained priest.

In the last years, he has been chaplain to the governor of the state of Plateau since 2015 and the parish priest of the Immaculate Conception parish and the dean of Zaramaganda deanery since 2018.

On March 31, 2021, Pope Francis appointed him Bishop of Lafia. He was ordained bishop on following June 24 at St. William's Cathedral in Lafia nassarawa state.

Catholic Church titles
Preceded by Matthew Ishaya Audu	Bishop of Lafia; 2021–	Succeeded by -
