= Henchir Ziane =

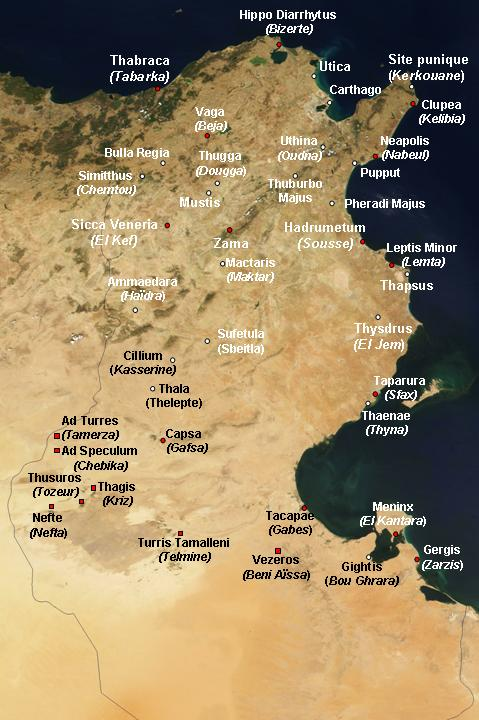
Cities of Tunisia.

Zian, also known as Zitha, is a locality and archaeological site near Bou Gharain south Tunisia.

The site represents the ruins of a civitas of the Syrtica region in the Roman Province of Byzacena (Roman North Africa). The ancient town was founded under the Roman Emperor Claudius in the 1st century. An older town or village may have stood on the site however. The ancient town was centered on a colonnaded Forum with three Roman Temples at one end. It was intended to be an emporium and is shown on the Peutinger Map as lying on the east–west trade road, and undoubtedly had commercial connections to the nearby port of Githis (modern Bou Ghara). The Roman town remains largely unexcavated. A small bust of Claudius was erected in the forum. The town had a pottery and amphorae making industry from the 1st to the 3rd century. The ruins of Zitha now known as Henchir Zian have revealed a number of inscriptions At some point in late antiquity the civitas was elevated to be a municipality.
