= Boughrara =

Boughrara بوغرارة Gigthi
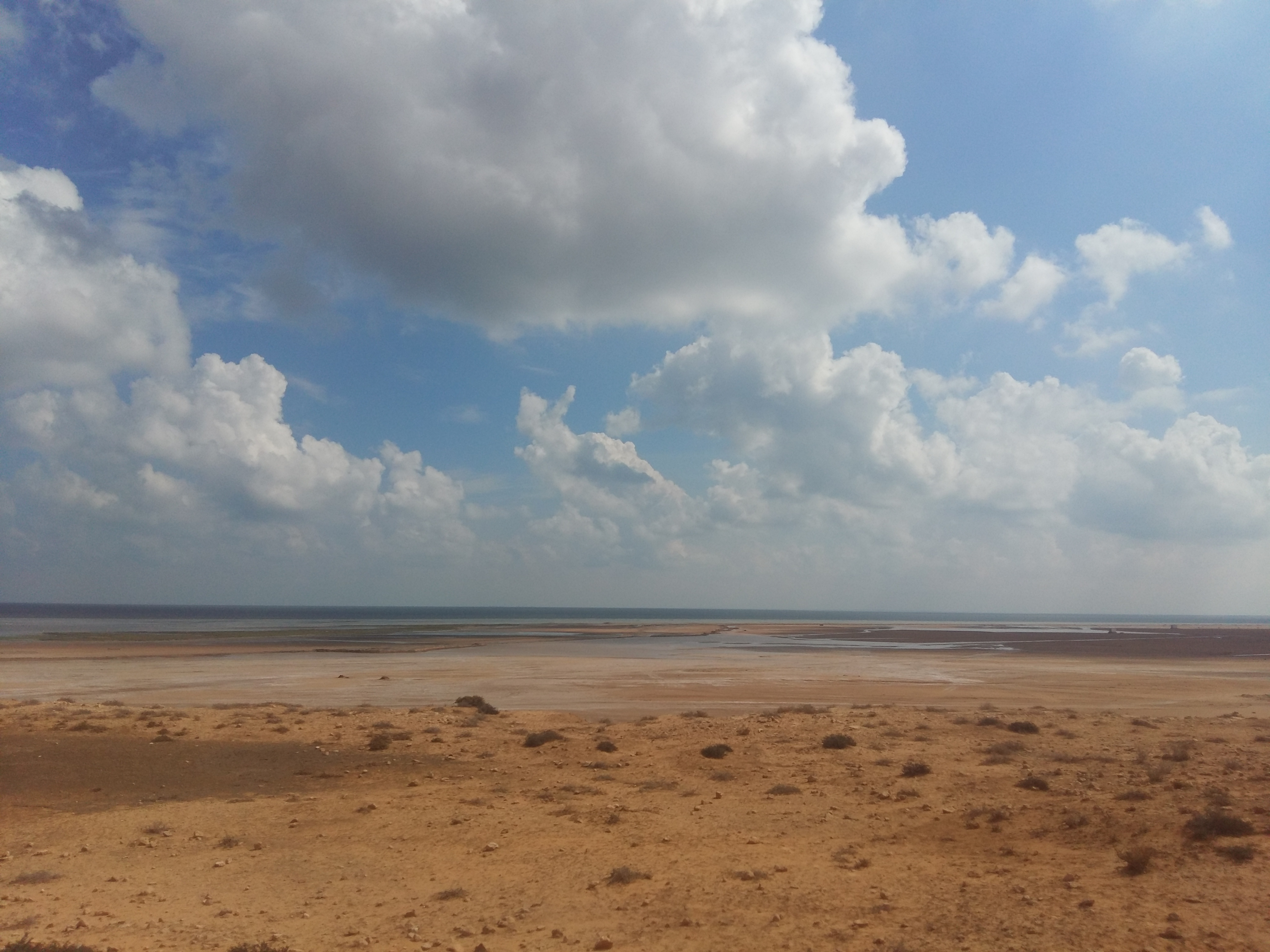
- Landscape of Boughrara.

- Location in Tunisia
- Coordinates: 33°32′16″N 10°40′34″E
- Country: Tunisia
- Governorate: Medenine Governorate
- Established: 1st century?
- Time zone: UTC1 (CET)

Boughrara (Tunisian Arabic: بوغرارة) is a coastal town in central-eastern Tunisia. It is located at around 33°32′16″N 10°40′34″E. During the Roman occupation of North Africa, Boughrara was known as Gigthis.

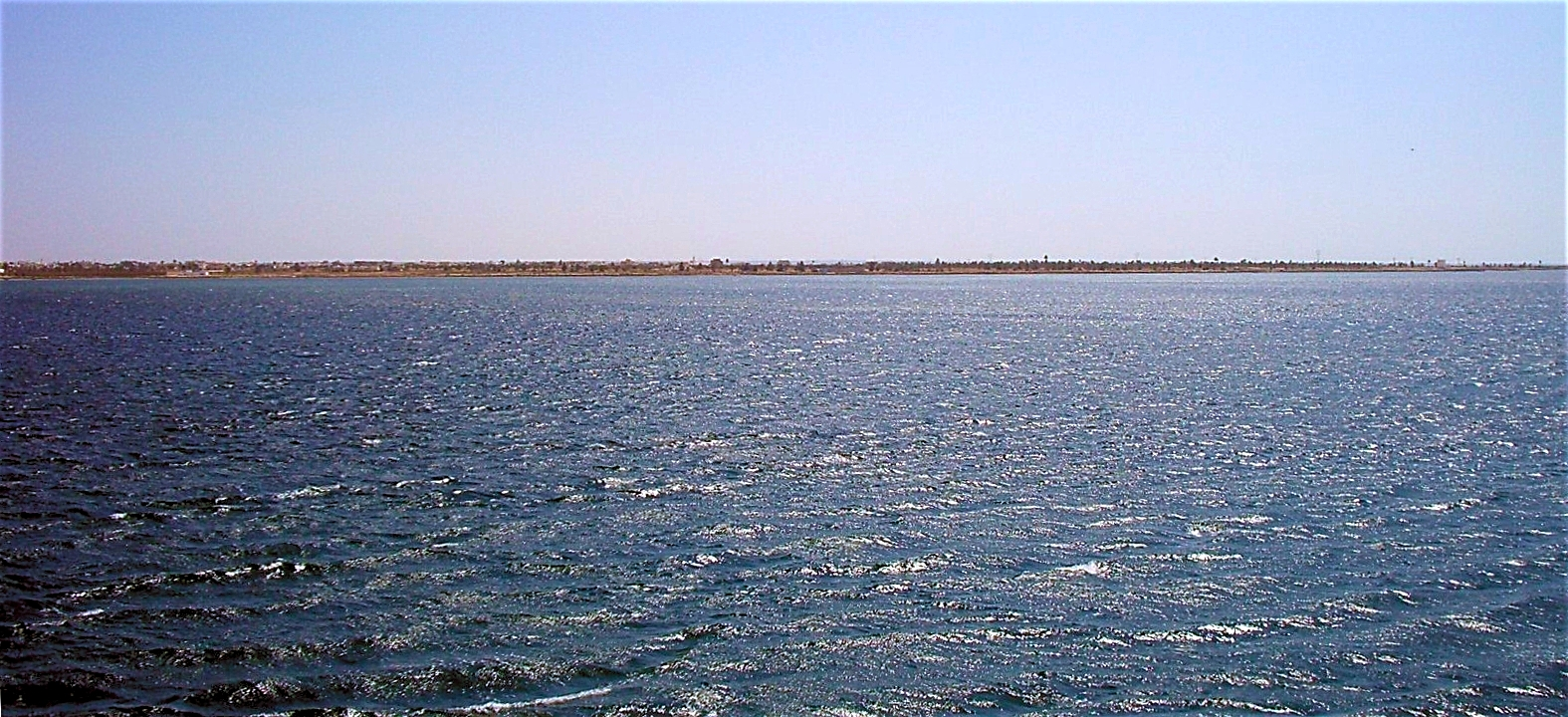
Golf of Boughrara

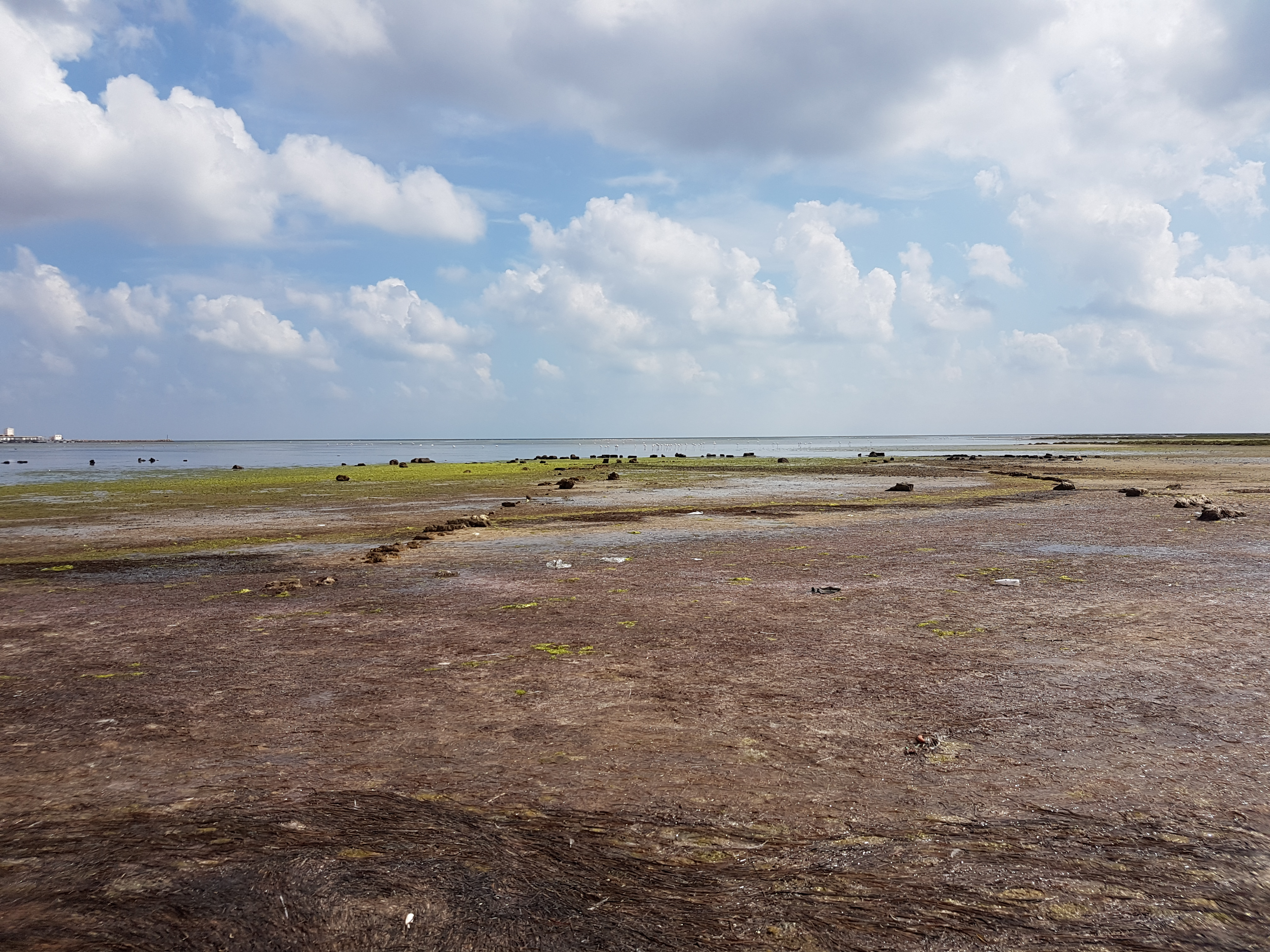
Port boughrara.

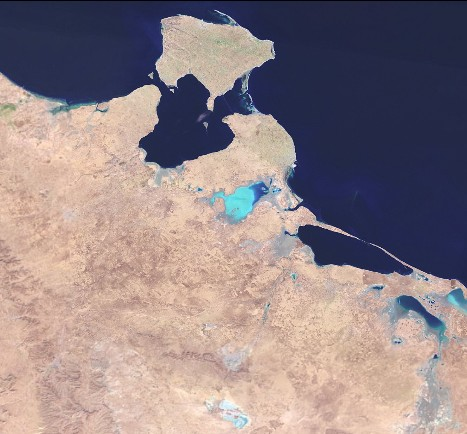
Boughrara from space

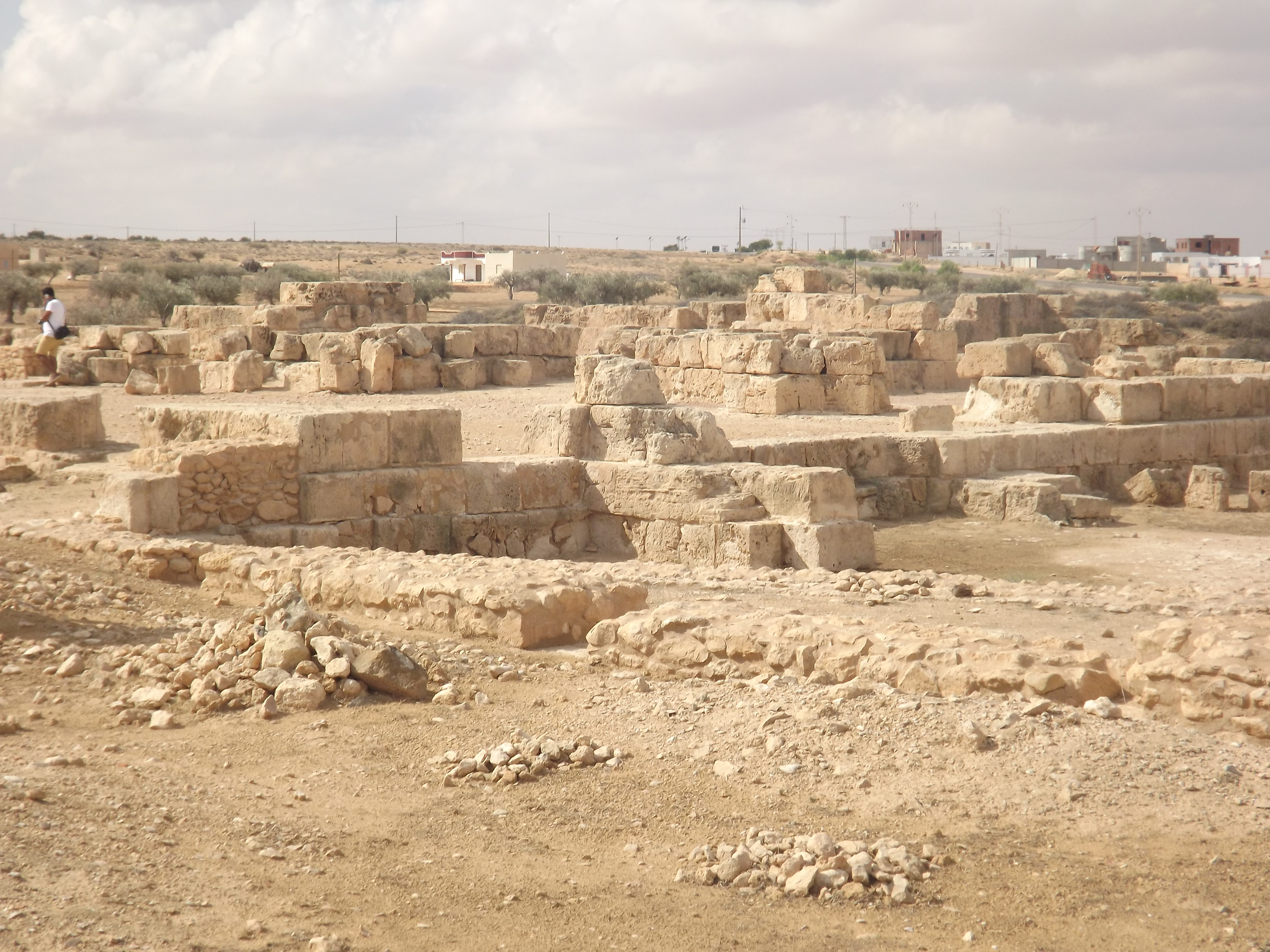
ruins at Boughrara

== See also ==
- Gigthi
