= Diocese of Shendam =

Roman Catholic diocese in Nigeria

Diocese of Shendam Dioecesis Shendamensis

Location
- Country: Nigeria
- Territory: a portion of Plateau State
- Ecclesiastical province: Jos
- Metropolitan: Jos
- Coordinates: 8°53′00″N 9°32′00″E

Statistics
- Area: 11,644 km^{2} (4,496 sq mi)
- Population: Total; Catholics: (as of 2022); 1,708,923; 228,341 (13.4%)
- Parishes: 39

Information
- Denomination: Roman Catholic
- Rite: Latin Rite
- Cathedral: Cathedral of the Sacred Heart of Jesus in Shendam
- Secular priests: 63

Current leadership
- Pope: Leo XIV
- Bishop: Philip Davou Dung

Map
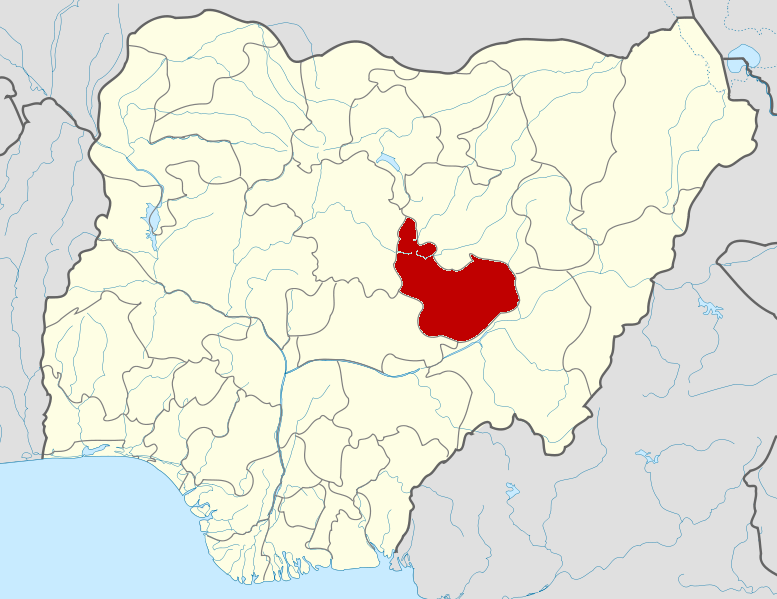
- The Diocese of Shendam is a portion of Plateau State which is shown in red.

The Roman Catholic Diocese of Shendam (Latin:Dioecesis Shendamensis) a diocese located in the city of Shendam, Plateau State in the ecclesiastical province of Jos in Nigeria. The Diocese was established on June 2, 2007.

The diocese's Cathedral is the Cathedral of the Sacred Heart of Jesus in Shendam. Shendam was the first Roman Catholic Mission foundation north of the rivers Niger and Benue in Nigeria. Three members of the Society of African Missions: Oswald Waller, Joseph Mouren, and Ernest Belin, arrived at Shendam on 12 February 1907 after spending 28 days in canoes on the river Benue.

== Bishops ==
1. Bishop James Naanman Daman, O.S.A. (June 2, 2007 – January 12, 2015)
2. Bishop Philip Davou Dung (November 5, 2016 -)

=== Other priest of this diocese who became bishop ===
- Oliver Dashe Doeme, appointed Bishop of Maiduguri in 2009

== See also ==
- Roman Catholicism in Nigeria

== Sources ==
- GCatholic.org Information
- Catholic Hierarchy
