= Roman Catholic Diocese of Jalingo =

Roman Catholic diocese in Nigeria

Diocese of Jalingo Dioecesis Ialingoensis

Location
- Country: Nigeria
- Territory: Taraba State
- Ecclesiastical province: Jos
- Metropolitan: Jos
- Coordinates: 8°53′59.9454″N 11°21′59.925″E

Statistics
- Area: 28,157 km^{2} (10,871 sq mi)
- Population: Total; Catholics: (as of 2022); 3,108,974; 394,802 (12.7%)
- Parishes: 49

Information
- Denomination: Roman Catholic
- Rite: Latin Rite
- Established: February 3, 1995
- Cathedral: Cathedral of Our Lady Queen of Peace in Jalingo
- Secular priests: 70

Current leadership
- Pope: Leo XIV
- Bishop: Most Rev. Charles Hammawa

Map
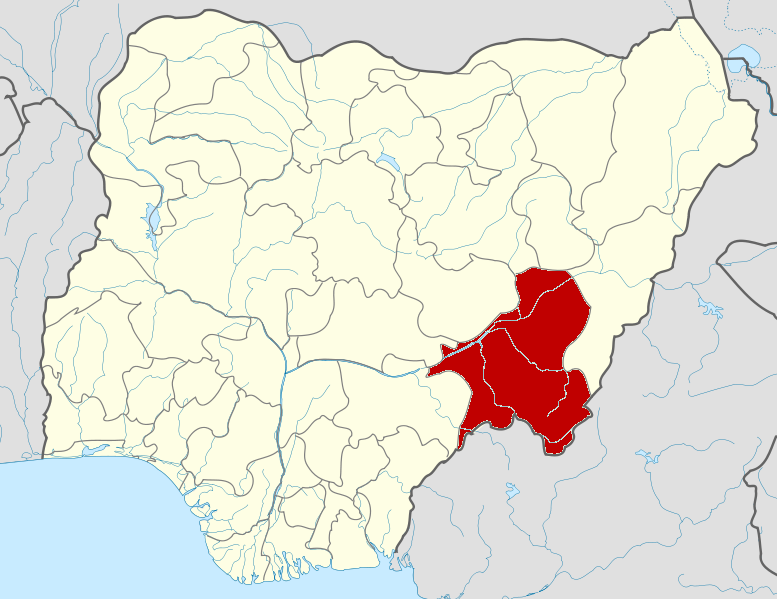
- Taraba State is shown in red.

The Roman Catholic Diocese of Jalingo (Latin: Ialingoën(sis)) is a diocese located in the city of Jalingo, which is in Taraba State and in the ecclesiastical province of Jos in Nigeria.

== History ==
- February 3, 1995: Established as Diocese of Jalingo from the Diocese of Yola

== Special churches ==
The Cathedral is Our Lady Queen of Peace Shavou-Mile Six, Jalingo. It replaced the former cathedral of St Augustine.

== Leadership ==
- Bishops of Jalingo
  - Bishop Ignatius Ayau Kaigama (1995.02.03 – 2000.04.14), appointed Archbishop of Jos
  - Bishop James Naanman Daman, O.S.A. (2000.12.05 – 2007.06.02), appointed Bishop of Shendam
  - Bishop Charles Hammawa, since 16 April 2008

== See also ==
- Roman Catholicism in Nigeria

== Sources ==
- GCatholic.org Information
- Catholic Hierarchy
