= Gigthi =

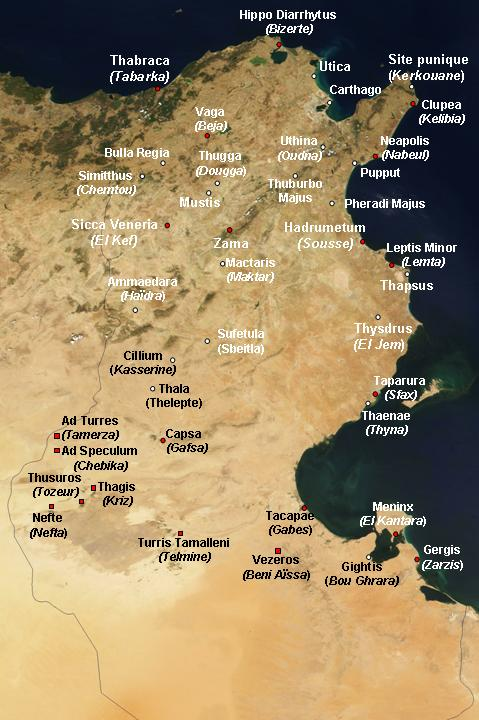
Map showing Gigthi

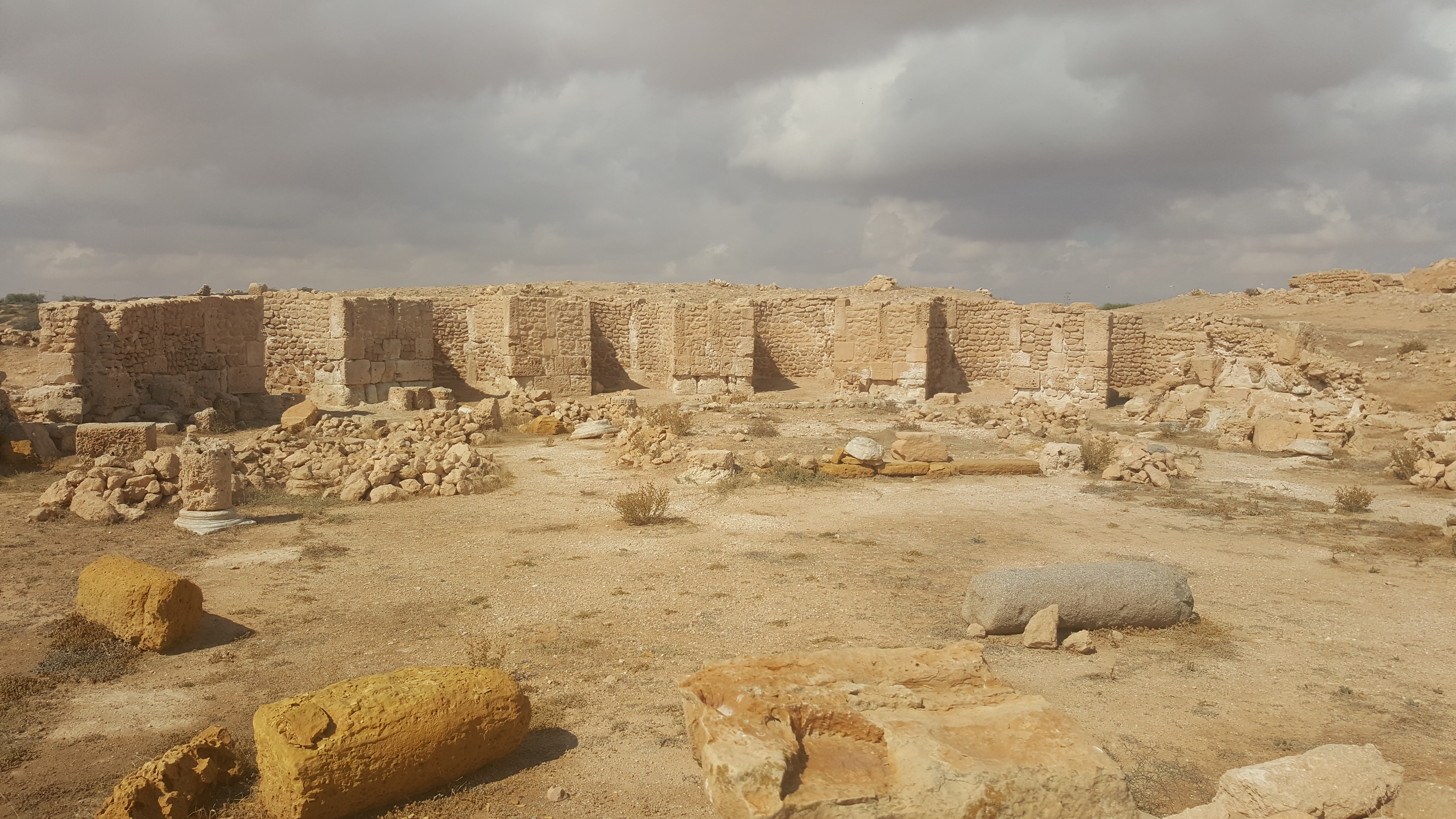
Ruins of Gightis market.

Gigthi was a town in the late Roman province of Tripolitania, which became a residential episcopal see. It corresponded to present-day Djorf-Bou-Ghara.

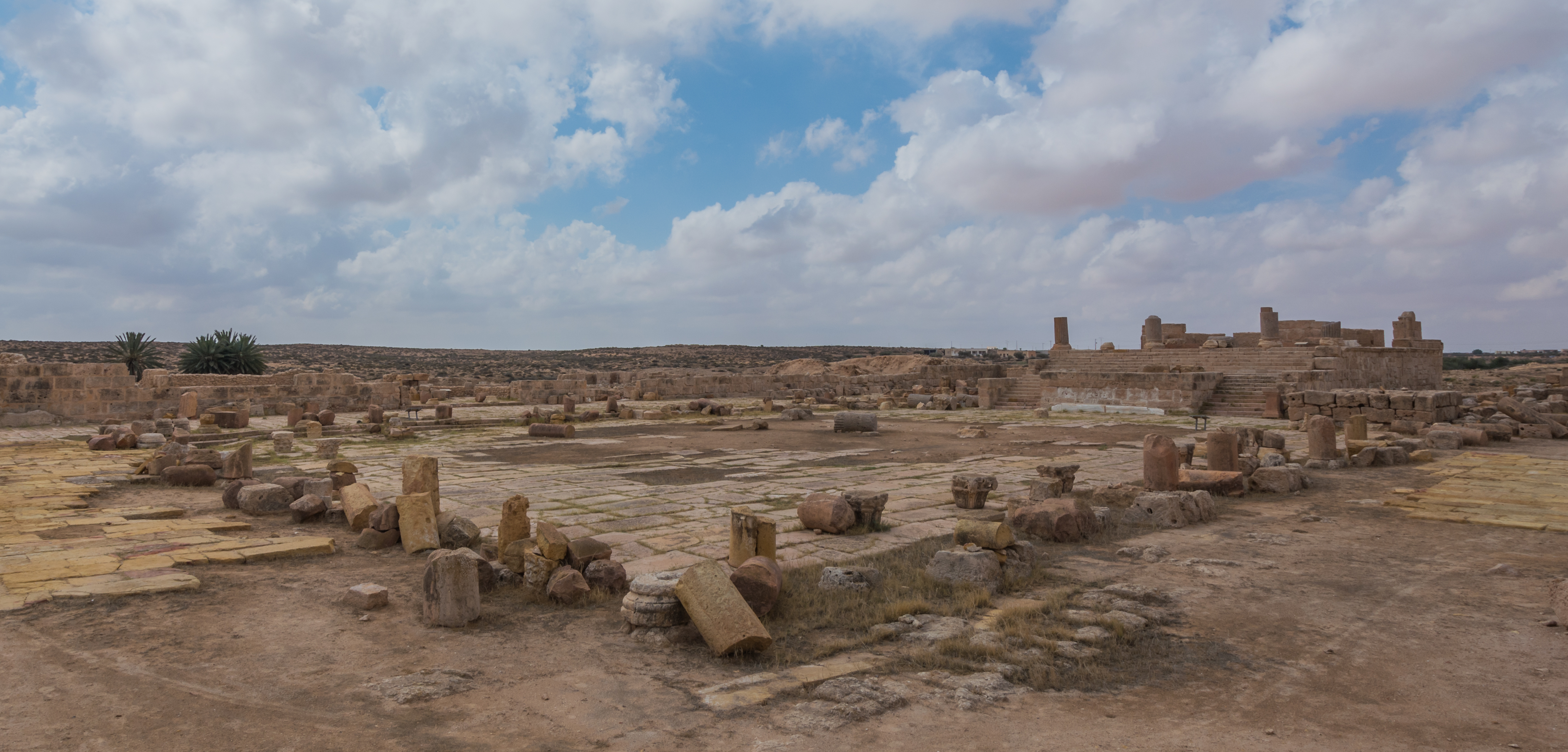
Githis Forum

Gigthi is today identified as extensive ruins near Rass el Bacha, Boughrara and Oulad Mehabeul.(Latitude: 33°31'59.98" Longitude:10°40'0.01") Gigthi was close to Wādī Bertema and Port de Boughrara. The town was 10 meters above sea level

Gigthi identified with Bou Ghara, was connected by a causeway to Djerba island and the home of the pre Roman Lotus-eaters. The town has remains of a forum with temples a monumental arch, treasury and porticoed street leading to the harbor north of the city, which was probably a market. It also boasted two bath houses. The town was a prosperous source of grain from the rule of Nerva to Caracalla, and Antoninus Pius made the town a municipium.

Inscriptions from the ruins show the survival of the Punic language well into Roman times, and strong sense of civic pride in the citizens.

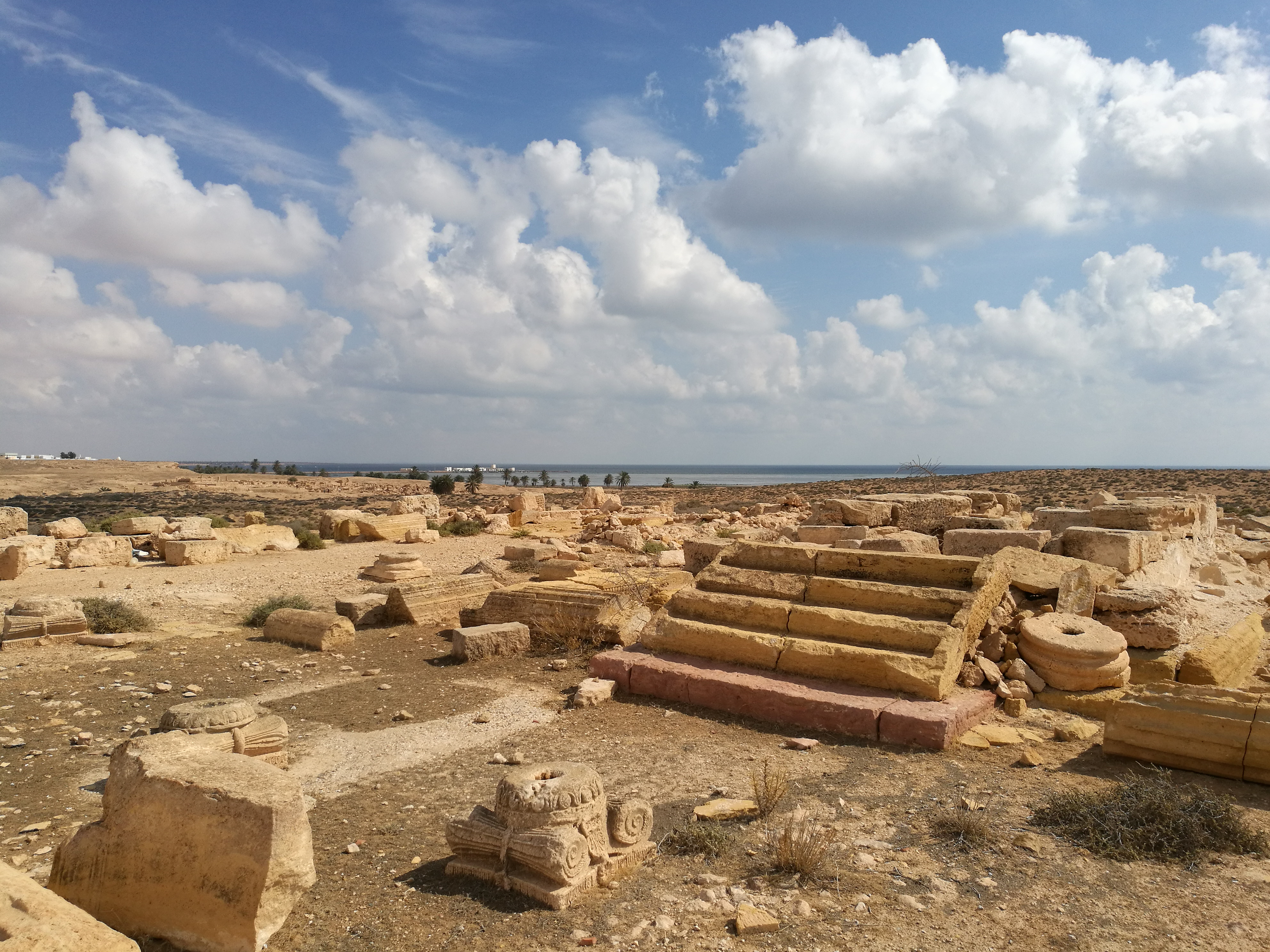
Temple of Mercure

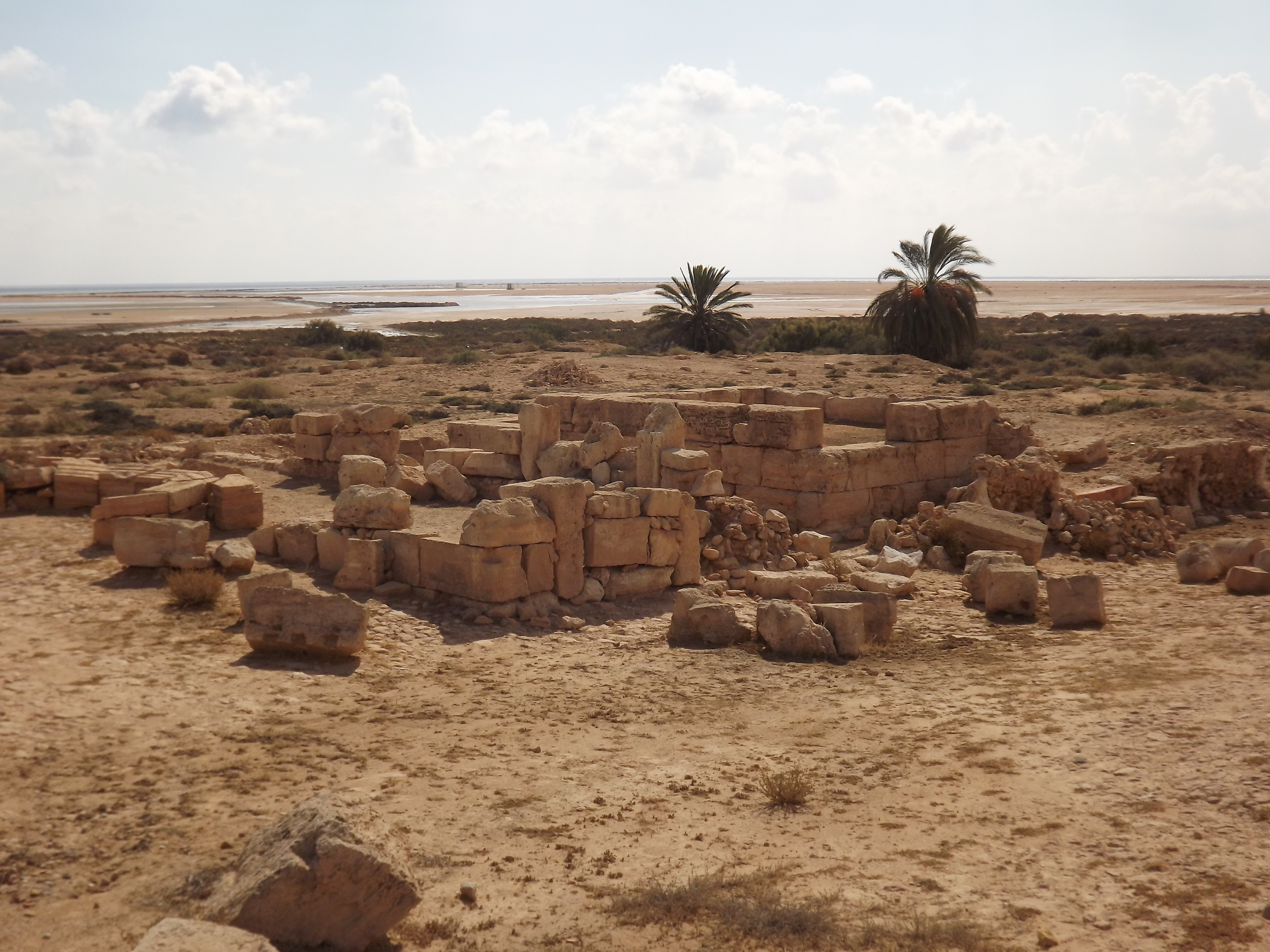
Temple of Asclepius

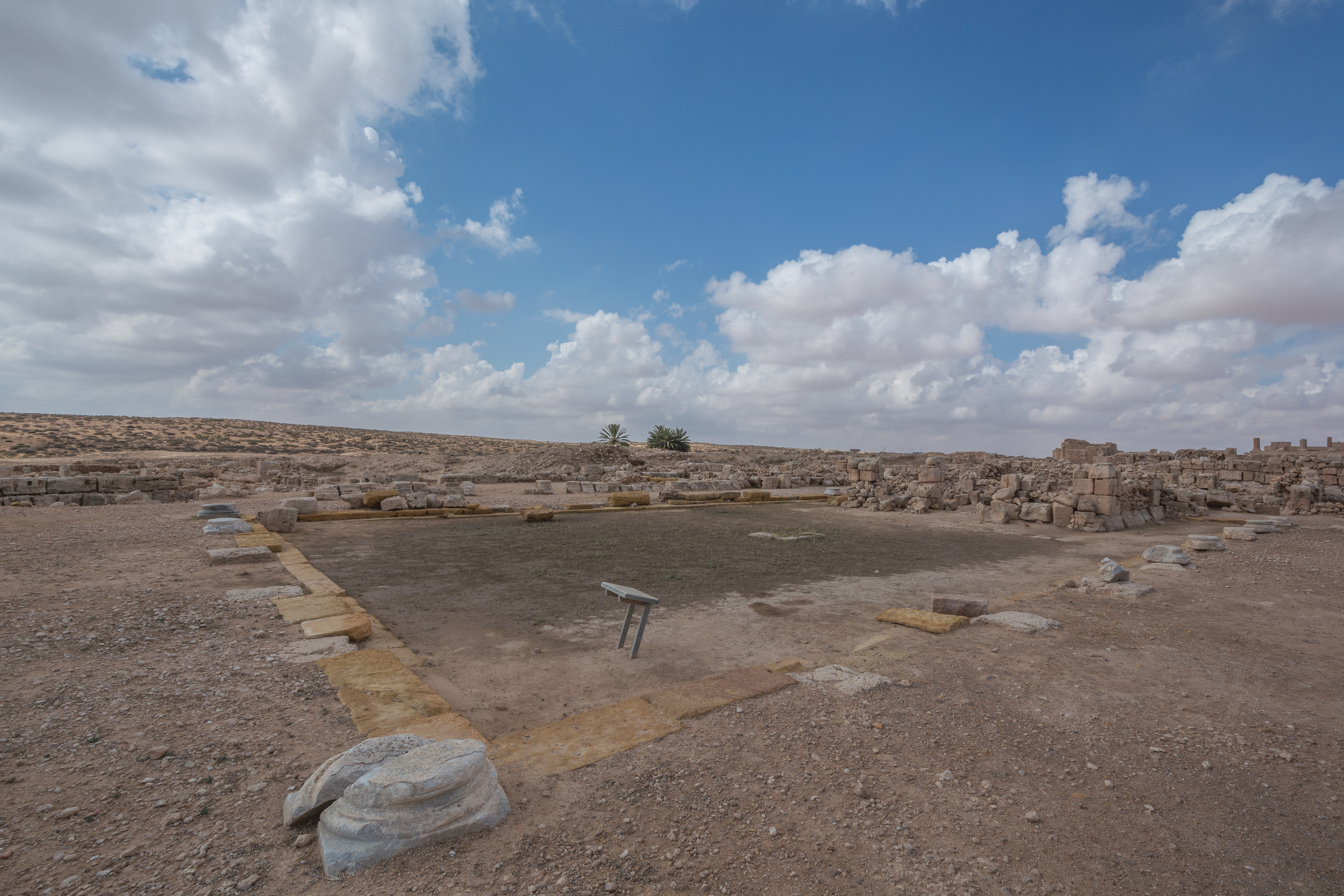
The Grand Temple

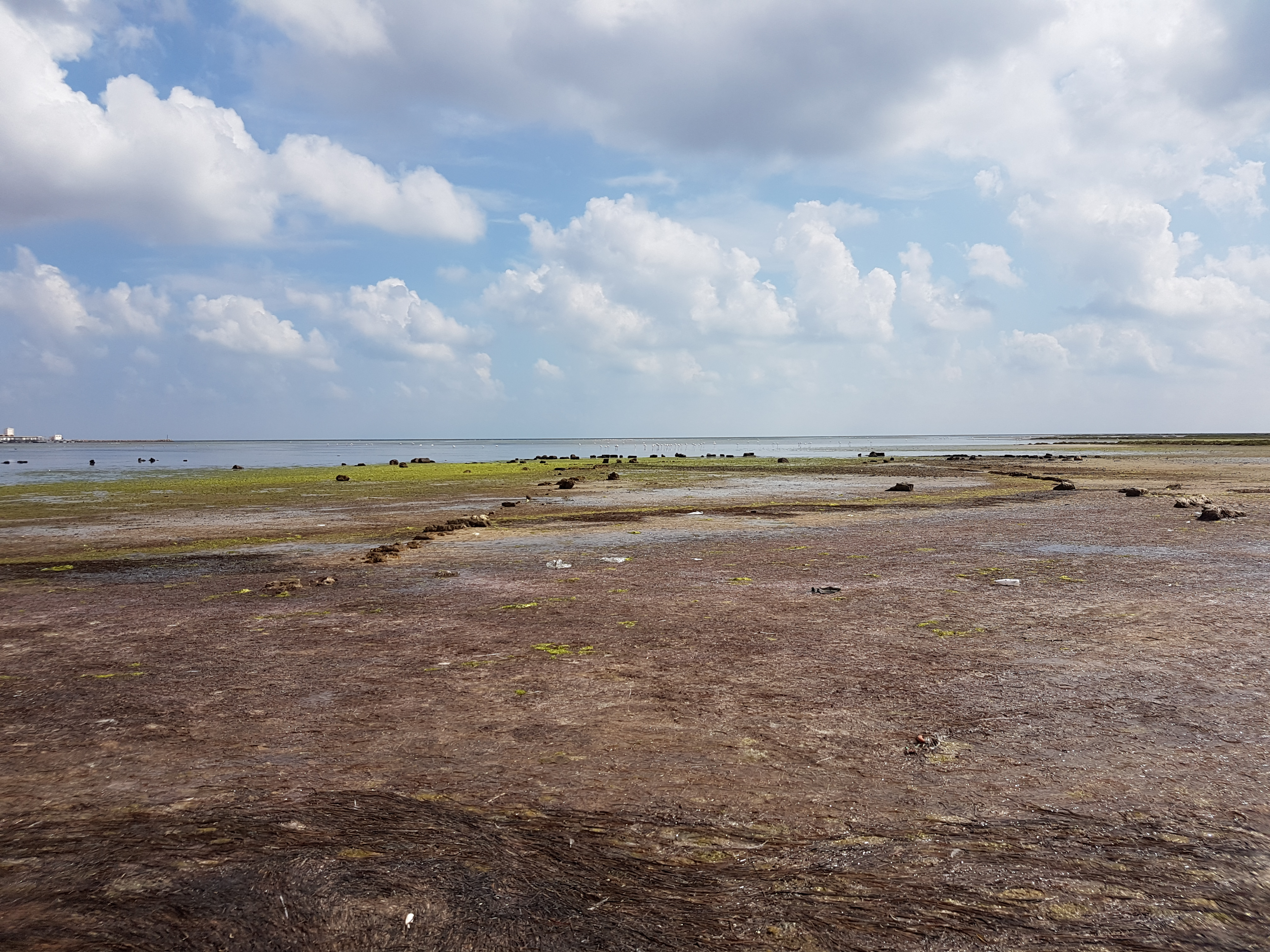
Port boughrara.

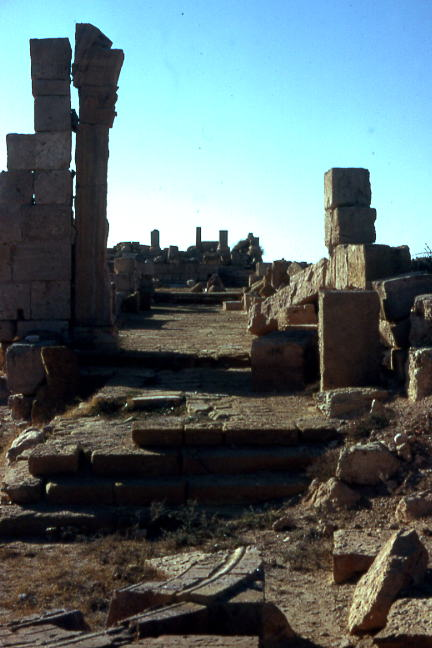
Githis in 1975.

== Bishopric ==
Gigthi was also the seat of an ancient bishopric, which ceased to function effectively in the 7th century with the arrival of Islamic armies. Gigthi is now a titular see of the Catholic Church, being restored as a titular in 1933. The Latin adjective referring to it is Gigthensis.

We know of Bishop Catulinus, a Catholic bishop who attended the Council of Carthage (411). The first titular bishop of the see was appointed on 23 March 1966. The current bishop is José Manuel León, CP
