= Ignatius Ayau Kaigama =

Nigerian prelate of the Catholic Church (born 1958)

His Excellency Ignatius Ayau Kaigama
- Archbishop of Abuja
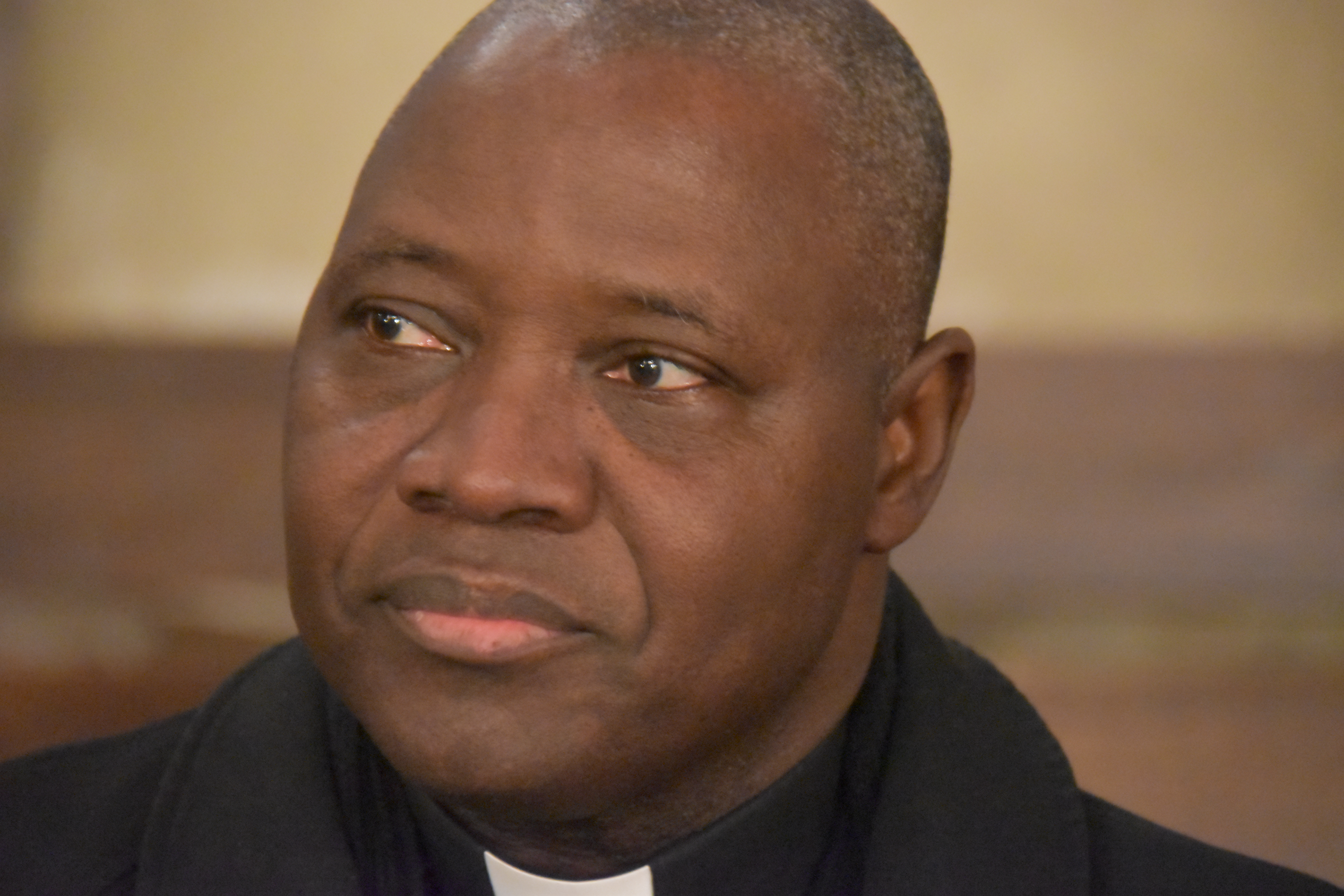
- Church: Roman Catholic Church
- Appointed: 9 November 2019
- Installed: 5 December 2019
- Predecessor: John Onaiyekan
- Previous posts: Bishop of Jalingo (1995-2000); Archbishop of Jos (2000-2019); President of the Nigerian Bishops Conference (2012 –2018); President of the Reunion of Episcopal Conferences of West Africa (2016–2022); Coadjutor Archbishop of Abuja (2019)

Orders
- Ordination: 6 June 1981
- Consecration: 23 April 1995 by Patrick Francis Sheehan

Personal details
- Born: Ignatius Ayau Kaigama; 31 July 1958 (age 68) Kona, Taraba State, Nigeria
- Education: Pontifical Gregorian University
- Motto: Per crucem ad Dei gloriam "By the cross, for the greater glory of God"

Ignatius Ayau Kaigama (born 31 July 1958) is a Nigerian prelate of the Catholic Church who has been the archbishop of Abuja since 9 November 2019. He was the first bishop of Jalingo from 1995 to 2000, archbishop of Jos from 2000 to 2019, and coadjutor in Abuja for 11 months before becoming archbishop there.

== Biography ==
Ignatius Kaigama was born in Kona, Taraba, on 31 July 1958. He studied for the priesthood at St. Augustine's Seminary in Jos and was ordained a priest on 6 June 1981. He earned a doctorate in theology in 1991 from the Pontifical Gregorian University.

He was vicar general of the Diocese of Yola and pastor of St. Augustine in Jalingo when Pope John Paul II appointed him bishop of the newly established Diocese of Jalingo on 3 February 1995. He was consecrated a bishop on 23 April 1995 by Bishop Patrick Francis Sheehan of Yola, with co-consecrators Bishops Gregory Obinna Ochiagha of Orlu and Athanasius Atule Usuh of Makurdi.

=== Archbishop of Jos ===
On 18 May 2000, Pope John Paul named Kaigama to succeed Gabriel Gonsum Ganaka as archbishop of Jos.

After the outbreak of what appeared to be interreligious violence in Jos in 2010, he advised that it was superficial to see religion and ethnicity as the sources of conflict. He said there are "social, economic, political factors responsible for this recurring crisis which we have never got at." He decried "political opportunists and ignorant religious preachers" who manipulate young people, especially the unemployed. He helped to calm the situation and clarified the nature of the conflict in the local and international press. That same year, he founded the Interfaith Youth Vocational Training Centre in Bokkos, Plateau State, which brings together Muslim and Christian youths in the hope of curbing violence in the region.

In 2011, he founded the Dialogue, Reconciliation and Peace Centre in Jos. In 2007 he founded the Female Catechists Formation Centre in Kwall, Plateau State. Prominent among his writings are the books: Dialogue of Life: An Urgent Necessity for Nigerian Muslims and Christians and Peace, not War: A Decade of Interventions in the Plateau State Crises (2002–2011).

On 25 July 2012, Pope Benedict XVI named Kaigama a member of the Pontifical Council for the Promotion of the New Evangelisation.

Kaigama was president of the Nigerian Bishops Conference from 2012 to 2018 and president of the Reunion of Episcopal Conferences of West Africa from 2016 to 2022. He was chair of the Interreligious Committee for Peace from 2005 to 2007 and of the Christian Association of Nigeria in Plateau State from 2007 to 2010. Together with the Emir of Wase, Alhaji Haruna Abdullahi, he has been involved in promoting mutual understanding between Christians and Muslims.

In 2014, as president of the Nigerian Bishops Conference, he signed a letter that commended the Nigerian legislation that abhorred same-sex marriage. It called the law a courageous act and a bold step that upheld the dignity and sanctity of marriage even in the face of pressure from foreign governments. In his speech at the Catholic Bishops Conference in 2015, he reiterated the position of the bishops in opposition to any legislation that contradicts "our cultural and religious norms of marriage". "Our commitment to providing justice to those whose rights are unfairly violated is unwavering", he said. He further stated that as with other pastoral cases, there would be a pastoral response for such people. This position has been largely misunderstood and misreported as "the Nigerian Catholic Bishops asking the government to jail people with different sexual orientations."

He participated in the Synod on the Family in 2014 and 2015. Speaking at the October 2014 session, Kaigama condemned foreign aid programs that condescend to Africans:

We get international organizations, countries, and groups which like to entice us to deviate from our cultural practices, traditions, and even our religious beliefs. And this is because of their belief that their views should be our views. Their opinions and their concept of life should be ours.

He objected to international organizations that promote population control when Africa needs food, education, reliable power supply and health care.

As president of the Nigerian Bishops Conference, he was the Visitor to Veritas University, Abuja. He has been the chancellor of Godfrey Okoye University, Enugu since 4 October 2013. As president of the Reunion of the Episcopal Conferences of West Africa, he was the grand chancellor of L’université Catholique de l’Afrique de l’Ouest (UCAO) and chancellor of the Catholic Institute of West Africa (CIWA), Port Harcourt.

In October 2015, the interreligious work which Kaigama and Muslim leader Emir Muhammadu Mohammed Muazu of Kanam are doing in Nigeria was profiled in the Deutsche Welle article, “Nigeria: Religious dialogue in times of terror.” Kaigama is widely travelled around the world to speak about peace and share his experience of dialogue/interfaith collaboration and peace building efforts.

=== Archbishop of Abuja ===
On 11 March 2019, Pope Francis named him Coadjutor Archbishop of Abuja. On 9 November 2019, he became archbishop of Abuja when Pope Francis accepted the resignation of Cardinal John Onaiyekan. He was installed on 5 December in a ceremony attended by Nigerian Vice President Yemi Osinbajo and the apostolic nuncio, Archbishop Antonio Filipazzi. Filipazzi noted that ethnicity played no role in the appointment of Kaigama because "the Catholic Church is one". As archbishop he is ex officio chancellor of Veritas University in Abuja.

In August 2022, he criticized the Nigerian government and ruling class for the increasing insecurity Christians are experiencing. He told Aid to the Church in Need:

There is subtle persecution, which is even more dangerous. It is done in such a way that you cannot say they are really killing Christians, they have not pushed the Christians away, but the way the Government carries on you can be sure the Christians are not favored. There is no equality. We are a country that is more or less 50-50 Cristian-Muslim, so there should be equal distribution of resources, of opportunities, and people should feel included in sensitive political, economic or security positions.

=== Honors ===
He was awarded two honorary doctorate degrees in Public Administration and Human Resource Management by Godfrey Okoye University, Enugu in 2015 and Madonna University in 2016 respectively.

He received an international award, the “Golden Doves Peace Award” from Italy in 2012, as well as the San Valentino Peace Award from the Diocese of Terni-Narni-Amelia in 2013, also in Italy. In 2014, he received the Religious Award of a Turkish Non-Governmental Organization, the UFUK Dialogue Foundation. On October 11, 2022 he was a recipient of a National Award from his home country, Nigeria with the title of Officer of the Order of the Federal Republic (OFR). Kaigama has also received several other awards.
