= Gabriel Gonsum Ganaka =

Catholic prelate

Servant of God Gabriel Gonsum Ganaka
- Archbishop of Jos
- Church: Roman Catholic Church
- Archdiocese: Jos
- See: Jos
- Appointed: 26 March 1994
- Installed: 27 March 1994
- Term ended: 11 November 1999
- Predecessor: John J. Reddington, S.M.A.
- Successor: Ignatius Ayau Kaigama
- Other posts: Auxiliary Bishop of Jos (1973 - 1974); Titular Bishop of Cuicul (1973 - 1974)

Orders
- Ordination: 4 July 1965 by John J. Reddington, S.M.A.
- Consecration: 9 September 1973 by Cardinal Dominic Ignatius Ekandem
- Rank: Archbishop

Personal details
- Born: 24 May 1937 Pankshin, Plateau, Nigeria
- Died: 11 November 1999 (aged 62) New York City, New York, United States

Gabriel Gonsum Ganaka was the Roman Catholic Bishop (later Archbishop) of Jos, Nigeria.

Born 24 May 1937 in Pankshin, he was ordained a priest on 4 July 1965. On 17 May 1973, aged 36, he was appointed as Auxiliary Bishop of Jos and as titular Bishop of Cuicul. He was consecrated on 9 September 1973 by Cardinal Dominic Ekandem.

On 2 February 1975, he was appointed Bishop of Jos. On 26 March 1994, aged 56, he was elevated to Archbishop.

Ganaka died on 11 November 1999, aged 62. On 2014, the Roman Catholic Archdiocese of Jos opened his cause for beatification naming him a Servant of God.
