= St. Anthony's Mission House =

Catholic seminary in New Jersey, US

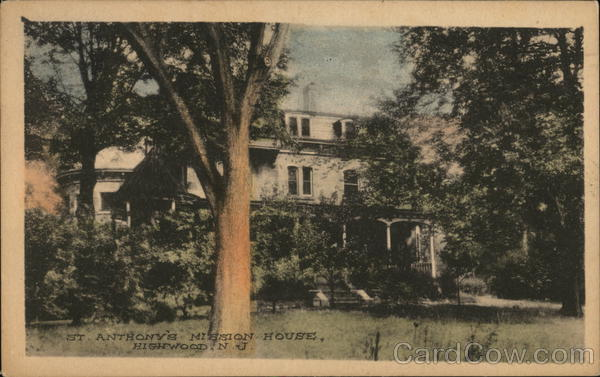
- St. Anthony's Mission House's original location in Highwood, Bergen County, New Jersey

Religion
- Affiliation: Catholic Church
- Rite: Latin Church
- Ecclesiastical or organisational status: Defunct
- Ownership: Society of African Missions

Location
- Location: New Jersey
- Country: United States

Architecture
- Established: October 11, 1921

St. Anthony's Mission House and Theological Seminary was a Catholic minor seminary for the Society of African Missions founded in Highwood, Bergen County, New Jersey. It was spearheaded in 1921 by Fr Ignatius Lissner, SMA as an interracial institution to educate men for the priesthood.

The seminary was one of several Catholic seminaries founded during Jim Crow to form African-American Catholic priests amid widespread opposition to the idea of Black priests in the United States.

St. Anthony's was relatively short-lived, producing only a few African-American priests (the first being the 11th in history) before moving to Tenafly and shuttering in 1926 due to racism among the American bishops.

As of 2022, the SMA property in Tenafly is a formation house and residence that celebrates liturgy daily, and serves as the headquarters of the SMA's American province. The property also houses the province's African Art Museum.

== History ==
=== Background and founding ===
Following the arrival of the Society of African Missions to the United States in 1897 (and in full force in 1906), as an outworking of their mission to people of African descent, the French priest Ignatius Lissner began advocating forcefully for a seminary to educate African Americans. The climate of racism, which was displayed even among the bishops themselves, was such that the only Black priests ordained before the late 19th century were the Healy brothers, all of whom passed for White during their ministries. As a result, most US seminaries remained closed to Black applicants through the mid 20th century.

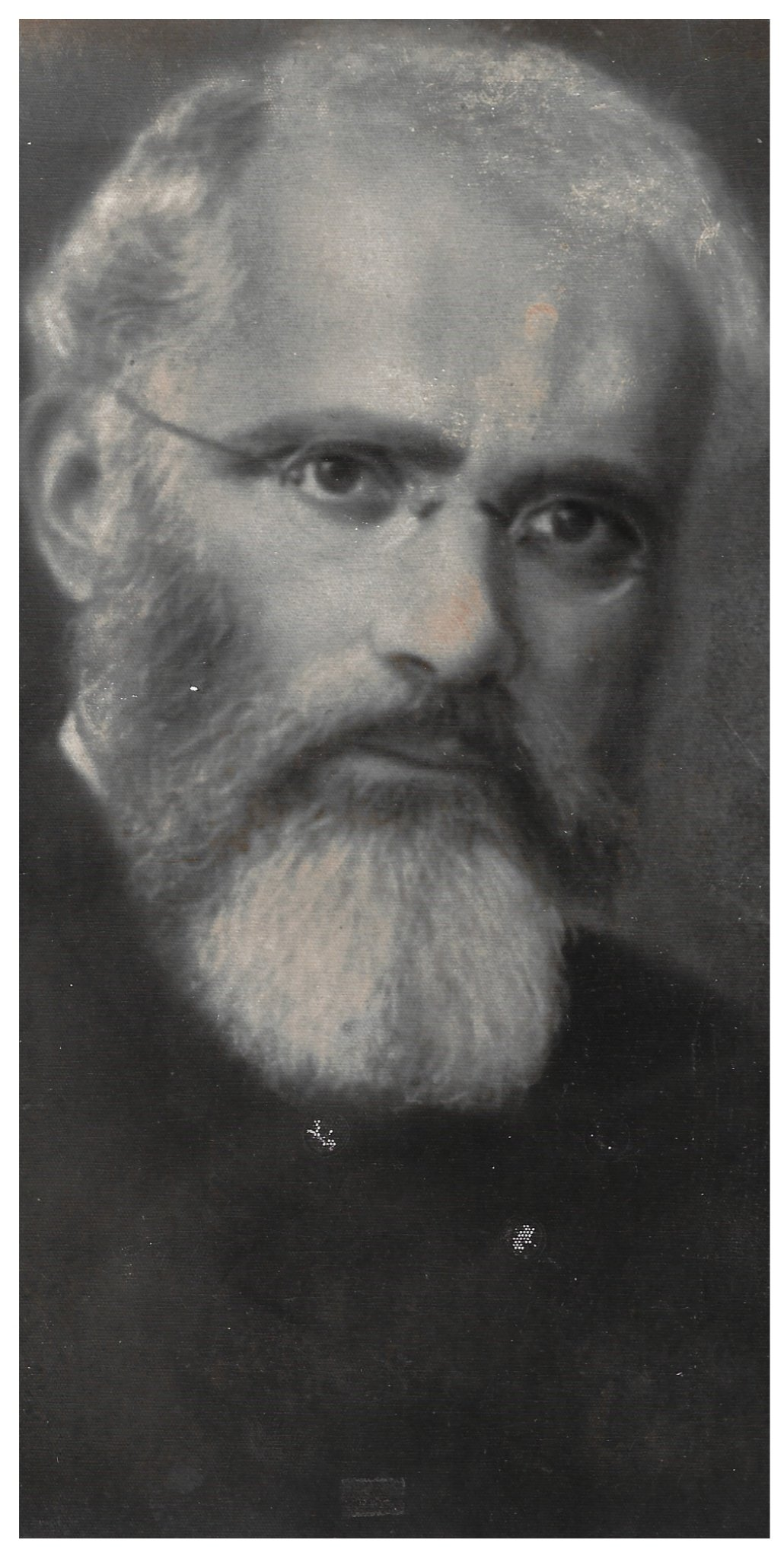
Fr Ignatius Lissner, SMA, founder of St. Anthony's Mission House

The SMAs, however, worked with a number of US bishops to find an avenue to ordain Black men stateside, and eventually found favor with one John J. O'Connor in 1921, when Lissner gained permission to open an integrated seminary in Highwood, Bergen County, New Jersey. Opened on October 11 of that year, it served as a formation center for the SMA's Lyon Province, located in the society's founding country of France. Pope Benedict XV and Propaganda prefect Cardinal Willem van Rossum had previously requested that US bishops remove obstacles to Black men entering their seminaries.

The future saint Katharine Drexel contributed funds for St. Anthony's land and construction, and the Franciscan Handmaids of the Most Pure Heart of Mary—co-founded by Lissner and Mary Theodore Williams in Savannah, Georgia—arrived in St. Anthony's founding year to serve as domestics.

=== Joseph John and William Floyd ===
In November 1921, St. Anthony's received the man who would go on to become its first Black graduate, Joseph Alexander John, a Grenadian American born in Carriacou in 1880. He had previously been in formation at Epiphany Apostolic College (the minor seminary of the Josephites, a religious community exclusively serving African Americans). John had previously been refused admission to Epiphany, until it was agreed that he would live and be ordained with another community. He lived with the Dominicans and later matriculated to Saint Paul Seminary in Saint Paul, Minnesota, under the auspices of the SMAs before arriving in New Jersey. A fellow SMA student from Saint Paul's also came to St. Anthony's, William Floyd.

St Anthony's was characterized largely by John's experience there, which included ongoing refusals from US bishops to accept him to serve as an SMA priest in their diocese upon his graduation and ordination. In 1922, St Anthony's had only six students and four faculty, and suffered from a lack of funding. The faculty, having previously been focused on ministry in Africa itself, struggled to relate to African-American students and Lissner himself also expressed a preference for native African students. Racism between students was also a factor, as the interracial nature of St. Anthony's led to various conflicts involving White students and their prejudices against their Black counterparts.

John himself was ordained in 1923 at St. Benedict the Moor Church in New York City, at the age of 43. Following controversial appearances in Georgia—where the SMAs had established a ministerial outpost with their White priests—he returned to New Jersey as a professor, where the seminary had moved to Tenafly. He later relocated back to the Caribbean and left the SMAs for the Archdiocese of Port of Spain in Trinidad. He died there in Cedros in 1943. Floyd was also ordained for the SMAs and later left the society to serve in Trinidad.

=== Later years and closure ===
John's inability to find an assignment in the US, and specifically in the SMA's operations among African Americans in Georgia, led the SMAs to cease accepting African Americans into formation, spelling doom for St. Anthony's future. The seminary closed for studies soon after in 1926.

St. Anthony's remains an SMA residence, however, and the SMAs established their American province there in 1941. Lissner himself, who served as the first provincial superior, died there at St. Anthony's in 1948.

=== 21st century ===
As of 2022, the SMA property in Tenafly is a formation house and residence that celebrates liturgy daily, and continues to serve as the headquarters of the SMA's American province. The property also houses the province's African Art Museum.

== Notable alumni ==
- Fr Joseph Alexander John, ordained in 1923 but later incardinated into the Archdiocese of Port of Spain in Trinidad.
- Fr William Floyd, also later incardinated into the archdiocese in Trinidad.

== See also ==
- Black Catholicism
- St. Joseph's Seminary (Washington, DC)
- St. Augustine Seminary (Bay St. Louis)
