= Coquard =

Coquard is a surname of French =origin. People with that name include:

- Arthur Coquard (1846–1910), French composer and music critic
- Bryan Coquard (born 1992),.French cyclist
- Jean-Marie Coquard (1859–1933), French Christian medical missionary
