= Tidiani Shitou =

Nigerian photographer

- Born: 1933; Shaki, Nigeria
- Died: 2000 (aged 66–67); Mopti Region, Mali
- Known for: Photography

"El Hadj" Tidiani Shitou (1933–2000) was a Nigerian photographer best known for his pioneering photographs of Yoruba celebrations and his portraits of doubles in Nigeria.

== Personal life ==
Shitou was born in Shaki, in the Oyo region of Nigeria in 1933. Part of the Yoruba tribe, Shitou was first employed as a tailor and merchant in Nigeria. In the mid-1950s, he began learning photography from Mama Awane, eventually moving to Mopti, Mali in 1962. In Mali, Shitou continued his photographic education alongside Malian photographer Bosco Maiga. During this time, Shitou traveled extensively throughout the country, settling first in Gao and then in Bamako. He continued to travel throughout southern Africa in search of photographic subjects and photographic mentors. In 1971, he settled again in Mopti with his second wife, Sarah Woussouf. He continued travelling throughout sub-Saharan Africa in search of subjects and techniques. In 1980, he made the pilgrimage to Mecca and upon his return, he acquired the nickname "El Hadj" after the headscarf worn by devout Muslims. Here he established his studio, Gangal, where he worked until his death in 2000. Shitou was survived by four wives and 26 children.

== Photographic career ==
Shitou is best known for his reworking of traditional Nigerian Ibeji art. In traditional Ibeji photography, photographs are doubled in order to fulfill the need for ritual figures used in the cult. Marilyn Houlberg writes: "A recent development in Ila-orangun, Ibomina, is the use of photographs to represent deceased twins. The use of the photograph as an active link with the spirit world is unprecedented in the history of photography as far as I know." Shitou's photographs utilize the traditional photographic overlay and portraiture techniques developed by the Yoruba. Shitou said to his son: "You must keep symmetry in mind. Use props along the axis, arrange the sitters, think of triangular or rectangular compositions." In addition to using portrait techniques, Shitou chose subjects who would initially be seen as doubles or twins through their dress, poses, and attitudes, but upon closer inspection, would be revealed as separate people. Shitou worked with 6x6 cameras (Yashika) and a DSRL for color.

== Exhibitions ==
Shitou's photographs were purchased by the Sokkelund Museum of Copenhagen and private collectors. Additionally, his work was exhibited at Photography Encounters in Bamako in 2001, at the Indiana University Art Museum in April 2007, and the Chronicles Nomads of Honfleur in May 2007. His work has also been exhibited the gallery of Pierre Malbec (Isle sur la Sorgue) in July and August 2007, at the Dettinger-Meyer Gallery (Lyon) in September and October 2007, Municipal Library of Lyon in December 2008 and January 2009, and in the African Museum of Lyon from February to May 2012.

== General references ==
- Lawal, Babtunde. "Sustaining the Oneness in Their Twoness: Poetics of Twin Figures (Ere Ibeji) among the Yoruba." Twins in African and Diaspora Cultures: Double Trouble, Twice Blessed. Ed. Philip M. Peek. Bloomington, Indiana: Indiana University Press, 2011.
- Micheli, Angelo. "Tidiani Shitou." AfriCultures. WikiAfrica, 2007. https://angelo-micheli.blogspot.com/p/el-hadj-tidiani-shitou.html
