= Ignatius Lissner =

French priest and missionary

The Reverend Ignatius Francis Lissner SMA
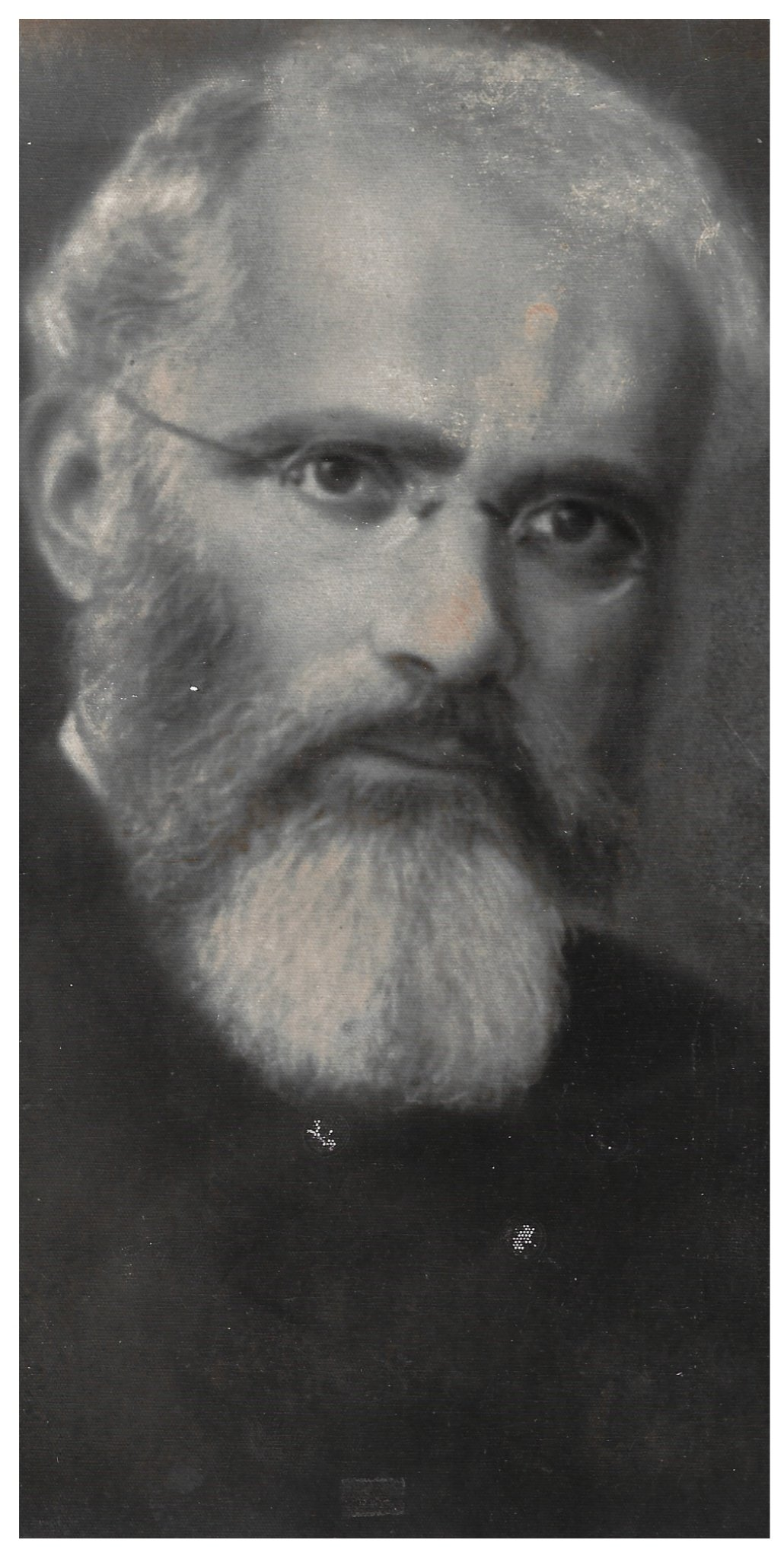
- Native name: Ignace Francious Lissner
- Church: Catholic Church

Orders
- Ordination: 1891

Personal details
- Born: April 6, 1867 France
- Died: August 7, 1948 (aged 81) Tenafly, New Jersey
- Buried: Mount Carmel Cemetery, Tenafly, New Jersey

Ignatius Francis Lissner, S.M.A. (Alsatian: Ignace Francious Lissner, French: Ignace François Lissner; April 6, 1867 – August 7, 1948) was a French-born Catholic priest who was instrumental in developing the ministry of the Church in the United States to the African-American population.

He established in the US a province of the missionary society to which he belonged, the Society of African Missions, and was also instrumental in founding the Franciscan Handmaids of the Most Pure Heart of Mary, the third-oldest surviving congregation of Black nuns in America, as well as a racially integrated seminary, St. Anthony's Mission House. He was called the "Apostle of the Negro" at the time of his death.

== Biography ==
=== Early life ===
He was born on 6 April 1867 to Nicholas Lissner and Anna Marie Spehner, the youngest of nine children, in Wolxheim, Bas-Rhin, in the region of Alsace in France. His father, a descendant of Jews from Poland, had converted to Catholicism, and he was raised in a devoutly Catholic home, from which five children were to enter service in the Church.

Lissner was drawn to the priesthood at an early age and entered the diocesan minor seminary to start his education. In 1888, he entered the Society of African Missions. He did his studies to prepare for ordination, first at the Society's school at Clermont-Ferrand, completing his theological studies at their Major Seminary in Lyon. He was ordained in the seminary chapel on 25 July 1891.

=== Africa ===
After his ordination, Lissner was assigned to serve in Whydah in the Kingdom of Dahomey, which was then undergoing increasing control by France. It is now part of the nation of Benin. In the summer of 1892, several months after his arrival, an insurrection among the native population broke out and many of the missionaries in the region fled the town. Lissner, however, chose to stay and was taken captive by King Béhanzin for several months. Managing to escape, he returned to the city on 2 December 1892 with French military forces who were able to retake it from rebel hands.

Lissner remained in Dahomey for another five years. The details of his work among the people there are lost, other than his founding the Parish of St. Joseph in Grand-Popo.

In March 1897 Lissner was assigned to travel to North America to raise funds for the work of the Society. After his arrival in the United States, he traveled widely throughout the nation to make the work of the Society known and to beg for financial support for its works. He also traveled to Canada, preaching throughout the Province of Quebec.

In 1899 he was assigned to work in Egypt, where he stayed until 1901. During that period, he accompanied Herbert Kitchener in his infamous conquest of Mahdist Sudan, serving as a chaplain. Kitchener's successor, Reginald Wingate, granted Lissner and the other SMA priests authority to establish missions in the occupied state.

After 1901, Lissner was sent back to the United States to resume his work of raising funds and recruiting for the Society.

=== America ===
For the next five years, Lissner worked as a minister to the poor of the country, which was itself still considered mission territory by the Church Church. With an infrastructure slowly growing to serve the growing number of immigrants from Europe, it was still under the supervision of the Sacred Congregation for the Propagation of the Faith. He became aware of the lack of organized care for the small population of African-American Catholics. The expectation that there would be organized outreach to the general population of ex-slaves after the American Civil War had not been met, as the system of recruiting specialists for the "Colored Mission", as it was called, had little success.

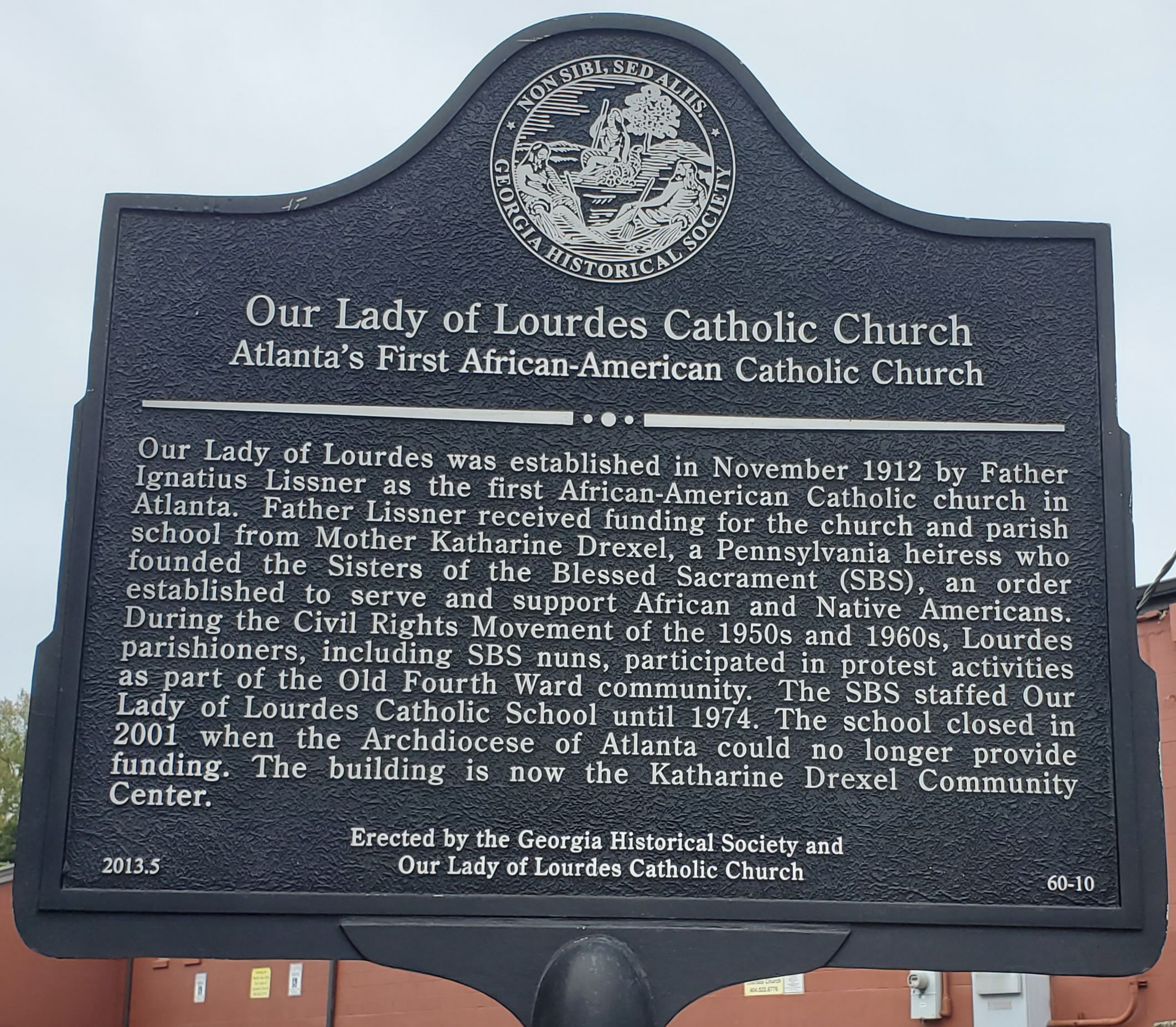
Historical marker for Our Lady of Lourdes Catholic Church, founded by Ignatius Lissner in Atlanta.

In 1906, Bishop Benjamin Keiley of the Diocese of Savannah-Atlanta received instructions from Rome that he was to use the services of the Society of African Missions to provide pastoral care to the blacks of the diocese. On the following 17 December Lissner received a letter from the bishop offering the Society the exclusive charge of this population. In January 1907, under Lissner's direction, two priests of the Society took charge of St. Benedict the Moor Catholic Church in Savannah, Georgia.

Lissner himself went to Rome to present his plans for the missions entrusted to his care, receiving the blessing of Pope Pius X for this work. He returned to the United States that following November, accompanied by several other members of the Society, all of whom were from his native Alsace. Over the next six years, Lissner went on to found a series of parishes and parochial schools to serve the blacks of rural Georgia (including Our Lady of Lourdes Catholic Church in Atlanta). The members of the Society carried out this work in the face of a lack of support from their colleagues among the local Catholic clergy and of hostility from the Ku Klux Klan.

==== Franciscan Handmaids of the Most Pure Heart of Mary ====
In 1915, a bill came before the Georgia legislature which would have outlawed the education of black children by white teachers. The schools which Lissner had established in Savannah were served by Franciscan Sisters, who were all white. In an effort to head off the closing of these schools, he proposed to Bishop Keily that a congregation of black religious sisters be founded to take over the charge of these schools. The bishop agreed to the proposal, saying "Yes; colored Sisters for colored people."

As a result, Lissner recruited the help of Elizabeth Barbara Williams, a longterm member of a former congregation of Franciscan Sisters which had disbanded, to help in this work. Williams, under Lissner's authority and guidance, was joined by other black women to found the Franciscan Handmaids of the Most Pure Heart of Mary, a congregation open to receiving members regardless of race. Under the name of Mother Theodore, she headed the new congregation.

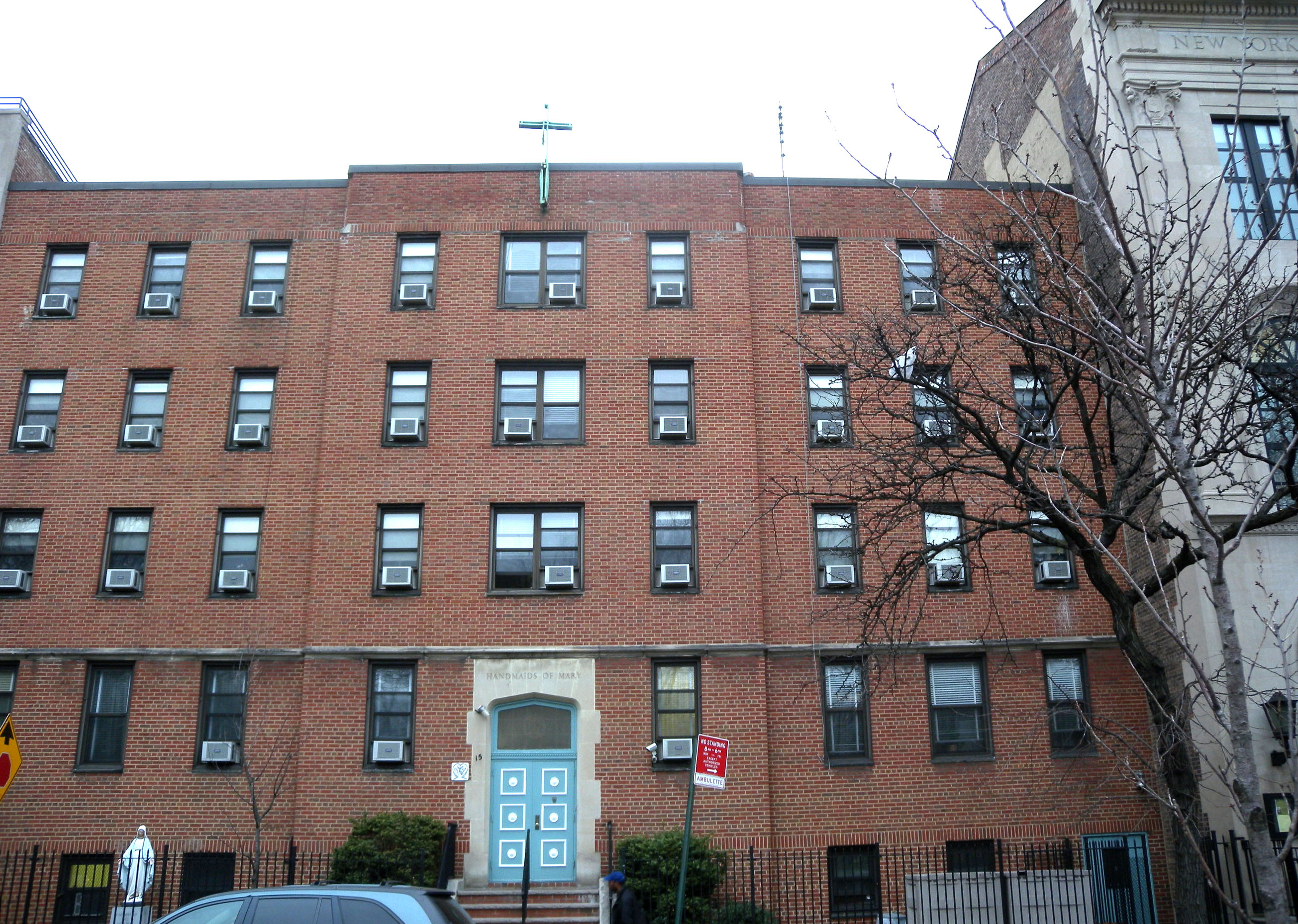
Franciscan Handmaids' motherhouse in New York City in 2010.

The bill which sparked their founding, however, did not pass in the Legislature and the white Sisters remained at two of the schools. The Handmaids took control of one of Lissner's schools. Having no real financial resources, however, they resorted to running a laundry and begging to support themselves, and faced a daily struggle for their survival as a community.

In 1922, Lissner made a business trip to New York City, where he met with Cardinal Patrick Hayes, the Archbishop of New York. Hayes was aware of the small community of Black Sisters which Lissner had helped found and was guiding. He asked Lissner for their help in caring for black children in Harlem. This led to their eventual relocation to New York.

==== St. Anthony's Mission House ====
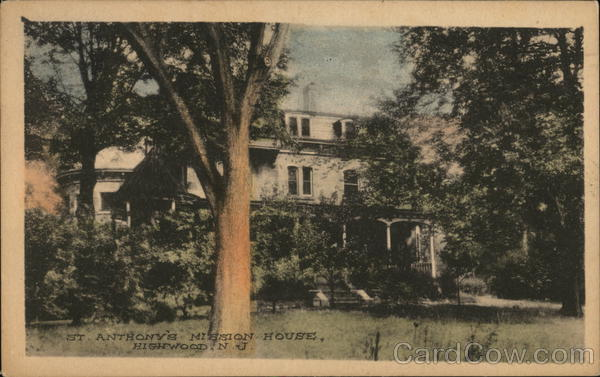
St. Anthony's Mission House, a racially integrated minor seminary founded by Fr Ignatius Lissner of the Society of African Missions in 1921. Originally located in Highwood, Bergen County, New Jersey.

At this period, there was scarcely any seminary in the United States which would accept African American candidates. Lissner saw as part of the mission of his Society the formation of a black clergy to serve their people. He envisioned establishing a seminary which would accomplish this. He received the support and funding for this project from the Philadelphia heiress and nun Katharine Drexel, S.B.S., who had dedicated her life and fortune to this same population and had formed a strong friendship with him from the time of his initial visit to America.

Relying largely on funds she provided, Lissner purchased property in Tenafly, New Jersey. He opened there St. Anthony's Mission House, the first seminary of the Society in the nation, in 1921, and one which was open to candidates of all races. He recruited six African American men to attend, two of whom reportedly graduated from there and received ordination; four more graduate from other schools and also became priests. Only one, Joseph Alexander John, is known to historical records. All of them, however, found so much prejudice in the congregations they tried to serve that they wound up leaving the country to serve elsewhere in the world. The seminary was forced to close in 1927.

==== US province ====
With the expansion of the Society's work to the West Coast of the United States through the foundation of St. Odilia's Mission in Los Angeles in 1926, Lissner recognized that the work of the Society could not be reliably maintained by Europeans. This was true whether relying on the Alsatians who had accompanied him or the influx of members of the Society from Ireland which had also taken place, and thus needed native members. He therefore began to work on establishing a fully functioning region of the Society. In this way, the institutions could be developed to recruit and train American men for missionary work and to establish sources of financial support. To this end, with the approval of his religious superiors in Europe, he began to lay the groundwork for an American province of the Society.

In 1938, Lissner organized the construction of a novitiate and seminary for the Society in Silver Spring, Maryland. The following year, the Superior General of the Society established the Pro-Province of the United States, just short of full status. Lissner was named Pro-Provincial Superior. This work progressed to the satisfaction of the superiors of the Society, and a Blessed Martin de Porres Mission in Tucson, Arizona was opened in 1940. As a result, on 7 March 1941, the status of the Missionaries of Africa in the United States was raised to that of a full Province. Lissner was appointed as the first American Provincial Superior.

The new Province was soon severely tried with the entry of the United States into World War II. Recruitment of young men became almost impossible due to the military draft and travel restrictions interfered with the ability of the new Provincial Council to meet and coordinate the work of the Province. Additionally, the seminary was destroyed by fire in 1943. Lissner, however, had gained such stature for his work that he was able to raise the funds needed to rebuild the seminary by end of the war, and even built Queen of Apostles Seminary for college-age seminarians near Boston. Under his leadership there was a successful melding of the differing cultural groups of Alsatians and Irish into a united organization.

=== Last years ===
Overcome by age and poor health, Lissner retired as Provincial Superior in April 1946. He retired to the house of the Society in Tenafly, where a niece helped to nurse him and handled his correspondence. Falling ill, he was taken to Holy Name Hospital in Teaneck, New Jersey, where he died on 7 August 1948. He was buried in Mount Carmel Cemetery in Tenafly.

== Legacy ==
At the time of Lissner's death, he was heralded of "Apostle of the Negro" for his work among African Americans. His fellow SMA priest Adolphe Gall wrote of his life:

“Fr. Lissner’s vocation was to work among the Coloured. A gifted builder, he erected many schools, knowing (as he often repeated) that through those schools he would be able to reach out to the children and through them to their parents. But such work called for many sacrifices. The segregation of White and Black was the law of the land in the South. His strong determination to continue this work found opposition from the Ku Klux Klan, some White leaders and local priests and sometimes even from bishops. But Fr. Lissner was a man of steel. He braced himself against all opposition and criticism. Silently he suffered all kinds of injustices and continued tenaciously to preach the Gospel to his people. As superior of the society, his suggestions and orders were straight-forward and often misunderstood or rejected. But time would prove the soundness and fairness of his judgement.”

A book on Lissner's work, "The Turning of a Tide: Ignace Lissner and the Society of African Missions in the USA" by Fr Edmund Hogan, SMA, was published in 2016.
