= Queen of Apostles Seminary =

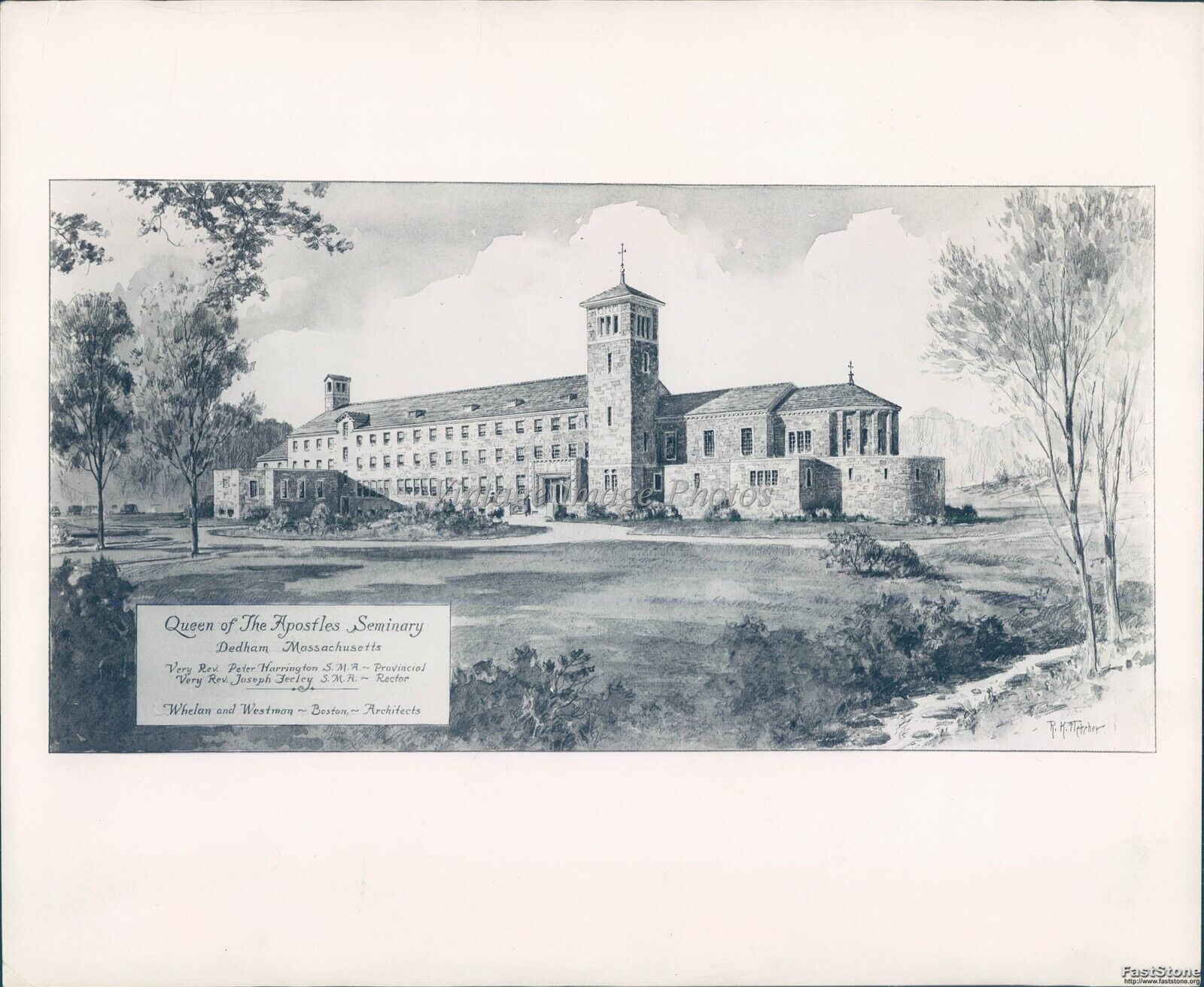
Rendering of Queen of Apostles Seminary, operated by the Society of African Missions in Dedham, Massachusetts from 1946 to the late 1960s.

Queen of Apostles Seminary was a minor college seminary in Dedham, Massachusetts, United States. It was established in 1946 by the Society of African Missions, and closed in the late 1960s.

== History ==
The Society of African Mission's American Province was established in 1941 amidst significant growth in vocations. In 1945, the society had acquired land in Dedham, Massachusetts, to hold a new minor seminary, a location chosen because of its proximity to Boston, which had a large Catholic population.

Queen of Apostles Seminary was incorporated on 26 December 1945 by the SMA's inaugural US provincial superior Ignatius Lissner and opened in 1946 to educate and train college-age SMA seminarians. Fr. James McConnell, SMA, was the seminary's first president, and Fr. Michael Moran, SMA, initially served as treasurer and clerk.

The seminary closed in the early 1980s and was used to house an art collection owned by the society, which still maintained a priest residence across the street.

In the late 1980s, the building was purchased by Northeastern University and has served ever since as the university's Dedham satellite campus.

== Presidents ==
1. Fr. James McConnell, SMA (1946–?)

== See also ==
- History of education in Dedham, Massachusetts
