= James O'Haire =

Irish missionary priest

James O'Haire was an Irish missionary priest, who was responsible for establishing a Society of African Missions presence in Ireland.

O'Haire was born in Dublin and trained as a missionary priest in All Hallows College, Dublin. He completed his studies in 1863 and was assigned to Cape Town, South Africa. While serving in St. Mary's, in Cape Town, he met with French missionaries from the Society of African Missions, working on behalf of Bishop Leonard. The bishop had suggested that they recruit English-speaking missionaries from Ireland.

James O'Haire volunteered his services to the SMA and went to Ireland to recruit priests for the missions. With the support of local Bishop William Delaney, he set up an Apostolic school in Cork in 1877. "Lough View" was located on the Old Youghal Road, later that year it moved to "Elm Grove", Mayfield. In 1878, Fr. Francis Devoucoux SMA came to Mayfield, to take charge of the Apostolic school.

Fr. O'Haire's Recollections of Twelve Years' Residence as a Missionary Priest: viz., From July 1863 to June 1875 in the Western District of the Cape of Good Hope, South Africa, was published in 1883.
