= Sacred Heart Hospital, Abeokuta =

Hospital in Nigeria

Sacred Heart Hospital, Lantoro Abeokuta is the first Nigerian hospital which was established in 1895 by the Catholic Church mission to Abeokuta through Reverend Father Coquard as a result of the leprosy epidemic that affected Egbaland between 1857 and 1859. It is located at Itesi, Abeokuta. Louisa Rodriguez was a Brazilian nurse who assisted Coquard for about 36 years serving as the director of nursing. Coquard had one year of instruction as a medical student before he joined the missionary.

The hospital was relocated to Lantoro in 1971 by Archbishop Aggey.

It is a 300 bedded hospital that serves the southwestern part of Nigeria and the Republic of Benin. It trains nursing students and postgraduate doctors in Family Medicine.
