= African Museum of Lyon =

- Musée Africain de Lyon
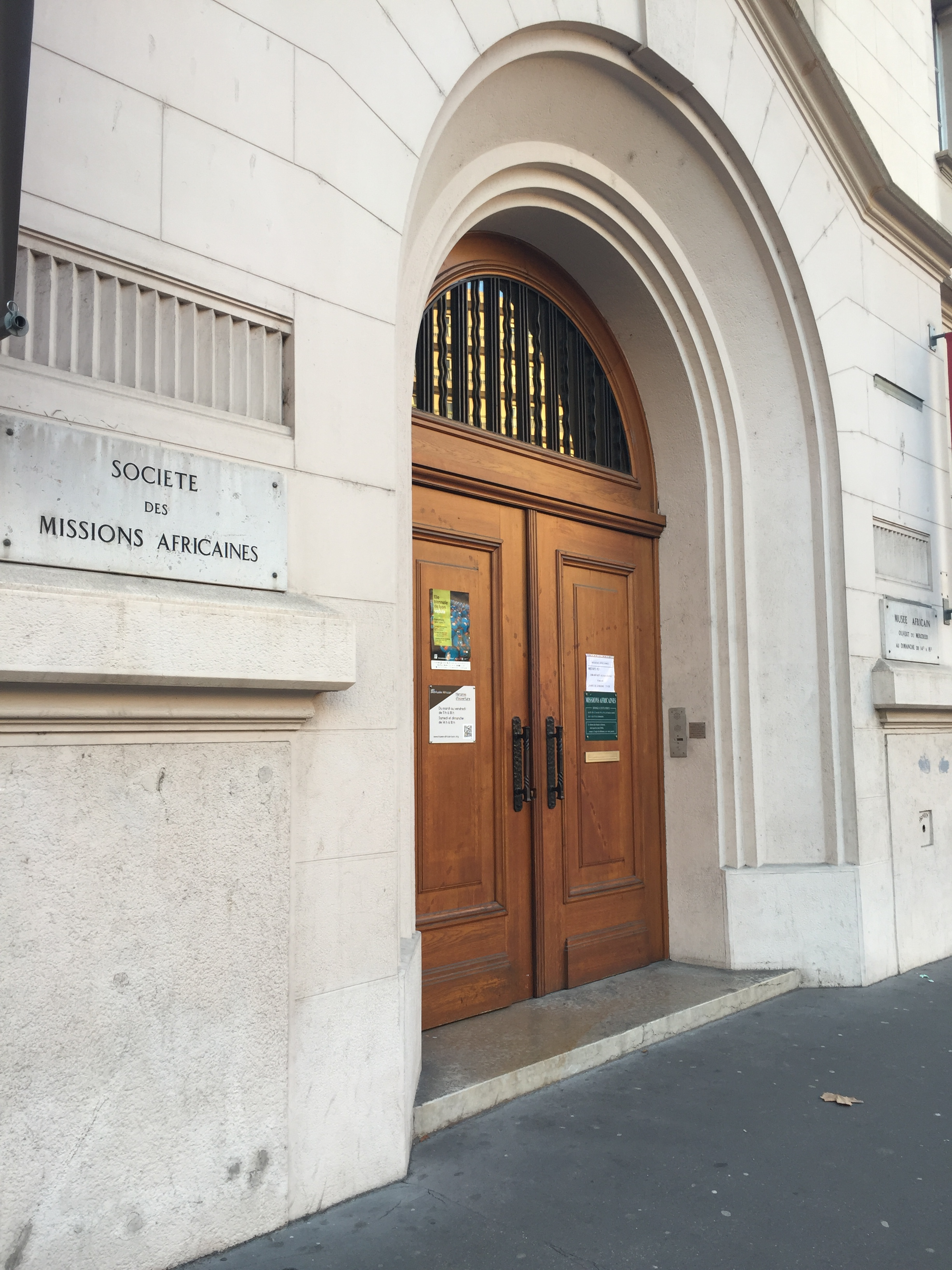
- Entrance

- Location within Metropole de Lyon
- Established: 1861
- Location: Lyon, France
- Coordinates: 45°44′59.5″N 4°51′28.5″E
- Type: Museum of African art, ethnographic museum
- Founder: Melchior de Marion Brésillac
- Owner: Society of African Missions
- Website: musee-africain-lyon.org

The African Museum of Lyon (French: Musée Africain de Lyon) is the oldest museum in France dedicated to Africa and African art, and one of the oldest museums in Lyon. The collections specialise in West African objects. From 2012 to 2017, the museum was managed by a secular association, the Association du Musée Africain de Lyon. It closed on November 27, 2017. The space left free has been dedicated to the Carrefour des Cultures Africaines, which allows access to the library to be maintained.

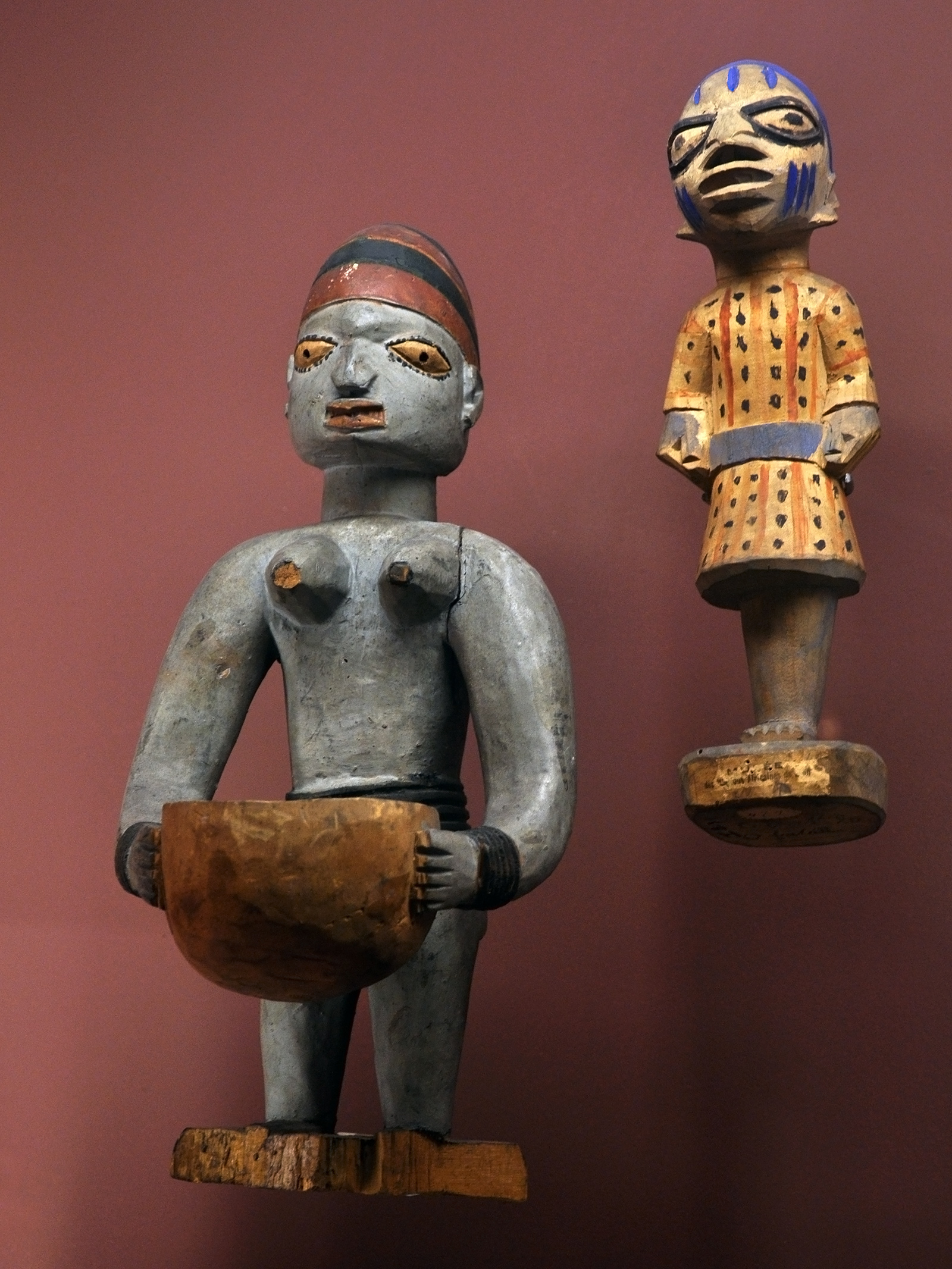
Musée africain Lyon 130909 04

The museum was created in 1861 by the Society of African Missions under the influence of Melchior de Marion Brésillac. After his death, Augustin Planque took over his role and asked the missionaries of the Society to send to France items reflecting the everyday, social and religious life of Africa. In 1998, the museum began the refurbishment and restoration of its building, which was formally reopened on 28 January 2001.

The museum is situated at 150, Cours Gambetta, Lyon. The building now provides 750m² for the display of the permanent collection, comprising 2,126 African objects. Exhibits are divided into three categories: Everyday Life, Social Life, and Religious Life. There is also a room reserved for temporary exhibitions.

== See also ==
- Society of African Missions
