= Fachtna O'Driscoll =

Irish priest and hurler

Fachtna O'Driscoll, is an Irish priest with the Society of African Missions. From 2013 to 2019, he was superior general.

== Early life and education ==
Fr. O'Driscoll, was born in Rathcormac, County Cork on 10 February 1954 to Jerome and Bridget (née O'Connor) O'Driscoll.

He went to primary school at Rathcormac National School and secondary school at St Colman's College, Fermoy, before attending St Patrick's College, Maynooth where he studied for a BA and later a Bachelor of Divinity.

A keen sportsman, he played hurling for Bride Rovers GAA, and represented Maynooth, winning medals in the Fitzgibbon Cup for hurling in 1973 and 1974 and the Devine Cup for soccer.

== Career ==
Fachtna O'Driscoll became a permanent member of the Society of African Missions in 1978 and was ordained as a priest in 1979. His first assignment was to Ekiti Diocese Nigeria where he lived until 1986 and learned Yoruba. After completing a master's degree in counselling at Boston College Massachusetts, he was named rector of the SMA house in Maynooth and was elected to the Irish Provincial Council of SMA in 1995. In 2001 he became Irish Provincial Superior of the SMA, and was re-elected to this position in 2006. From 2013 to 2019 he was Superior General of the Society of African Missions worldwide.

His older brother Gus is also a member of the SMA serving in the Philippines.
