= Society of African Missions =

Roman Catholic society of apostolic life

- Societas Missionum ad Afros (Latin)
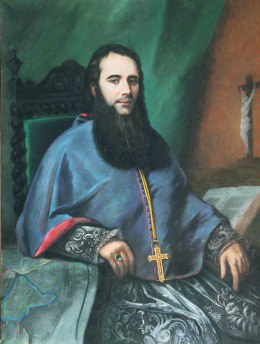
- Melchior de Marion Brésillac, Founder of the Society of African Missions
- Abbreviation: S.M.A (post-nominal letters)
- Formation: 8 December 1856; 169 years ago
- Founder: Venerable Melchior de Marion Brésillac, SMA
- Founded at: Lyon, France
- Type: Society of Apostolic Life of Pontifical Right for Men
- Headquarters: Generalate: Via della Nocetta 111, 00164 Rome, Italy
- Members: 881 members (748 priests) as of 2020
- Superior General: Fr. Francois Herve du Penhoat, SMA
- Ministry: Missionary work
- Parent organization: Catholic Church
- Website: smainternational.info/en

The Society of African Missions (Latin: Societas Missionum ad Afros; French: Société des Missions Africaines), also known as the SMA Fathers, is a Catholic religious society of apostolic life of pontifical right for men founded by Melchior de Marion Brésillac in 1856. They serve the people of Africa and those of African descent.

Members add the nominal letters S.M.A after their names to indicate their membership in the congregation. Fr. Antonio Porcellato is the superior general as of November 2022.

== History ==
=== Foundation ===
The Society was founded in 1856 by Bishop Melchior de Marion Brésillac with the blessing of Pope Pius IX. The post-nominal initials S.M.A is the acronym of the Society's name in Latin: Societas Missionum ad Afros.

=== Ireland ===
The presence of the SMA in Ireland began in 1876 when Fr James O’Haire volunteered his services to the SMA to go to Ireland to recruit English speaking priests for the missions. He set up an apostolic school in Cork in 1877, 'Lough View', on the Old Youghal Road. Later that year it moved to 'Elm Grove', Mayfield. In 1878 Fr Francis Devoucoux SMA came to Mayfield, Cork to take charge of the Apostolic school. Following studies in Cork, students would go to Lyon, France to study Theology and Philosophy, before ordination. In 1919 the first ordinations occurred in Cork for the SMA by Bishop Broderick.

The Irish province was officially founded on 15 May 1912 by Bishop Paul Pellet, SMA Superior General, and is based in Cork. In Cork there was the Juniorate/Classical school (St. Joseph's) in Wilton, and the Theological Seminary, Blackrock Road. From 1914 to 1924 a novitiate for brothers was housed in Westport. In 1916, the SMA was left Cloughballymore House in Galway in the will of its owner Llewellyn Blake, setting it up as a seminary, St Columba's Scholasticate in Cloughballymore, Galway, with students studying Philosophy and taking a degree at University College Galway. The SMA Juniorate at Sacred Heart College, Ballinafad, Co Mayo, which was founded in 1908, by Fr. Joseph Zimmerman, it prepared students for the Intermediate Certificate with students then transferring to Cork to complete the Leaving Certificate. It closed in 1970. Cloughballymore operated until the 1950s when it was sold by the society. In 1926, Provincial of the SMA Maurice Slattery bought Domantine House and estate in Co. Down, which served as the SMA Theologate, taking over from Cork as the major seminary for the society. Dromantine served as a seminary up until 1972, training over 600 priests in that time, From 1972 SMA students were trained at the National Seminary, Maynooth College. In 1996 Dromantine House was developed into a retreat and conference centre.

Four members of the Irish province have served as superior general of the Society of African Missions including Bishop Kieran O'Reilly SMA and Bishop Patrick Harrington SMA. Currently there are about 200 members of the Irish province. Cois Tine (which means fireside in Irish) is an initiative by the SMA in Ireland helping immigrants from Africa. The SMA administers two churches in Cork: St Joseph's Church, Blackrock Road, and St Joseph's Church, Wilton. The society also has a plot in St Joseph's Cemetery, Cork.

=== United States ===
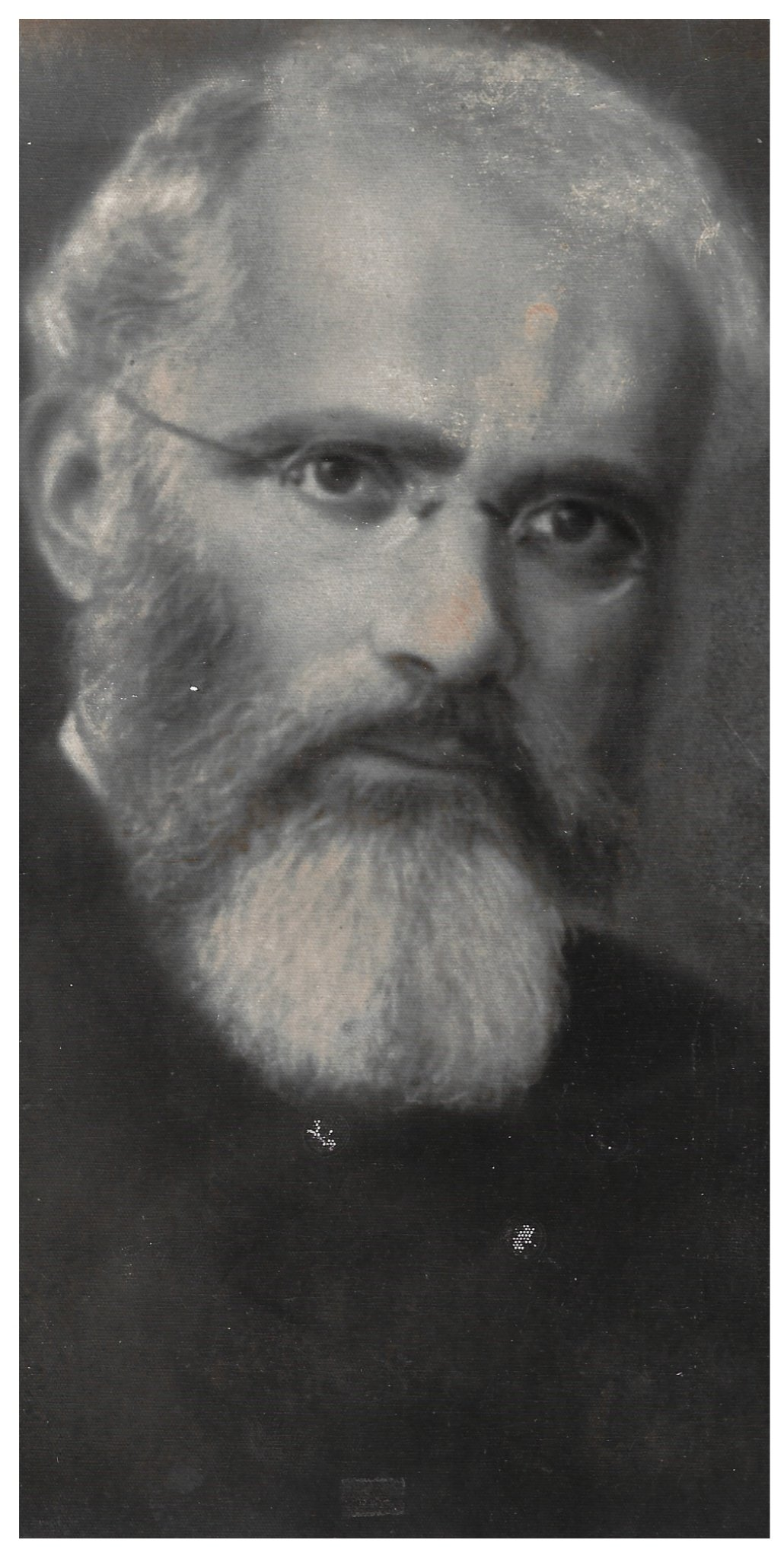
Fr Ignatius Lissner, SMA, founder of the society's missions in America.

The SMAs began ministry in the United States in 1906, being given authority over Black Catholic ministry in the whole of the Diocese of Savannah—nine years after Fr. Ignatius Lissner first arrived stateside to promote SMA activities and fundraising. The diocese then encompassed the whole of the state of Georgia, and as such Lissner and other SMA priests were responsible for founding some of the oldest Black parishes there (including Our Lady of Lourdes Catholic Church in Atlanta, and St. Peter Claver Catholic Church in Macon's Pleasant Hill Historic District).

During his time in Savannah, Lissner also helped found the Franciscan Handmaids of the Most Pure Heart of Mary, in response to a Georgia law banning White teachers from teaching Black students. Lissner enlisted the help of Mary Theodore Williams to found an order of Black nuns to teach there instead. The Handmaids were founded in 1917 and the group remained there in Georgia before following Lissner to New Jersey in the 1920s, and later moving to New York.

Lissner started in 1921 what was at the time the United States' only integrated seminary, St. Anthony's Mission House in Bergen County, New Jersey. Black men were otherwise barred from all but one US Catholic seminary, and Lissner envisioned St. Anthony's as a solution. Racism from the US bishops thwarted his goal, however, and only a few men are known to have been ordained from St. Anthony's. It closed in 1926.

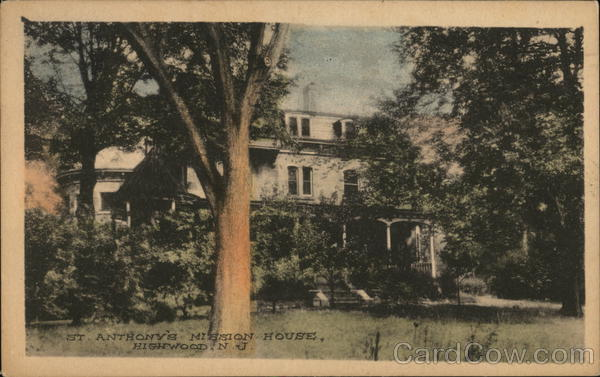
St. Anthony's Mission House, a racially integrated minor seminary founded by Fr Ignatius Lissner of the Society of African Missions in 1921. Originally located in Highwood, Bergen County, New Jersey.

The US province of the SMAs was established in 1941 with Lissner as its first provincial superior. His administration established Queen of Apostles Seminary near Boston, Massachusetts, which lasted from 1946 to the late 1960s. Lissner died at St. Anthony's in 1948.

The province's headquarters remains as of 2022 in Tenafly, New Jersey at the former seminary, where there is also a formation house and residence that celebrates liturgy daily. The US province today has priests as well as lay missionaries, and is engaged in service in various African-American parishes and ministries. They maintain a house in Dedham, Massachusetts as well as an SMA Formation Center in Takoma Park, Maryland.

In keeping with their founder's goal of preserving the culture of the African peoples, the US province of the society maintains in its provincial headquarters an African Art Museum, one of five maintained worldwide by the society.

== Membership ==
All the members of the Society of African Missions—both priests and religious brothers, as well as the lay missionaries who work with them—strive to be living witnesses to the Gospel of Jesus Christ in the sixteen countries in Africa where they are present and among people of African heritage wherever they live.

For most of its history, the majority of the society's members came from Europe or North America. African men who were interested in ministry were discouraged from joining the society and directed towards their own dioceses. This approach changed in the 1980s, and since that time the vast majority of vocations have come from Africa and Asia.

The Society is not a religious institute, but rather is a society of apostolic life.

== Organisation ==
The international administrative headquarters is in Rome.

As of 2017, there are:

- 5 Provinces: Britain, Ireland, Italy, Lyon, and the United States.
- 4 Districts: Canada, the Netherlands, Spain and Strasbourg
- 8 Districts in Formation: Benin, Central African Republic, Nigeria; Great Lakes (Angola, DR Congo, Kenya, South Africa, Tanzania, Zambia); Gulf of Guinea (Burkina Faso, Ghana, Ivory Coast, Liberia, Togo); India; Philippines and Poland. The Society counts 865 members.

=== Superiors General of the Society of African Missions ===
- 1858–1859 : Bishop Melchior-Marie-Joseph Marion de Brésillac, SMA
- 1859–1907 : Fr. Augustin Planque, SMA
- 1907–1914 : Msgr. Paul Pellet, SMA
- 1914–1919 : Msgr. Auguste Duet, SMA
- 1919–1933 : Fr. Jean-Marie Chabert, SMA
- 1933–1937 : Fr. Auguste Bruhat
- 1937–1947 : Fr. Maurice Slattery, SMA
- 1947–1958 : Fr. Stephen Harrington, SMA
- 1958–1973 : Fr. Henri Monde, SMA
- 1973–1983 : Fr. Joseph Hardy, SMA
- 1983–1995 : Fr. Joseph Patrick Harrington, SMA
- 1995–2001 : Fr. Daniel Cardot, SMA
- 2001–2010 : Fr. Kieran O'Reilly, SMA
- 2010–2013 : Fr. Jean-Marie Guillaume, SMA
- 2013–2019 : Fr. Fachtna O'Driscoll, SMA
- 2019–2025 : Fr. Antonio Porcellato, SMA
- since May 2025 : Fr. Francois Herve du Penhoat, SMA

=== Provincials of the Irish Province ===
- Stephen Kyne (1912–1913)
- Maurice Slattery (1913–1918, 1925–1931)
- William Butler (1918–1925)
- Stephen Harrington (1931–1946)
- Patrick Kelly (1946–1952)
- John Creaven BA MA PhD(1952–1968)
- Laurence Carr BCL DCL (1968–1976)
- Joseph Donnelly BA BSc HDipEd (1976–1978)
- Cornelius Murphy BA HDipEd (1978–1989)
- John Quinlan STL LSS MA (1989–2001)
- Fachtna O'Driscoll BA BD (2001–2013)
- Michael McCabe BA DD (2013–2019)
- Malachy Flanagan (2019-)

== Melchior de Marion Brésillac ==
Since January 1928, the remains of the society's founder, Melchior de Marion Brésillac, have been interred in the chapel of the Society of African Missions in Lyon, France. The society has opened his cause for canonization and the inquiry period was concluded in May 2000. All documents were handed over to the Congregation for the Causes of Saints and await further action.

Pope Francis declared him Venerable on 27 May 2020.

== Other notable members ==
- Jean-Marie Coquard, French medical missionary
- John MacCarthy, Irish-born, Archbishop of Kaduna, Nigeria
- John Moore, served as Bishop of Bauchi
- Fr Ignatius Lissner, French founder of the society's American operations
- Kieran O'Reilly, served as Archbishop of Monrovia, Liberia and Bishop of Killaloe, Ireland
- Leo Hale Taylor, American born, educated in Cork, served as Vicars Apostolic of Western Nigeria
- Patrick Devine, founder of the Shalom Centre for Conflict Resolution and Reconciliation in Kenya
- Patrick Kelly, served as Bishop of Benin City
- Richard Finn, Bishop for the Roman Catholic Archdiocese of Ibadan in Nigeria
- Thomas Broderick, Irish born, educated in Cork and Lyon, served as Vicars Apostolic of Western Nigeria (Roman rite)
- Thomas P. Hughes, served as Bishop of Ondo
- Timothy Carroll, served as titular bishop of Tipasa in Mauretania and Apostolic Vicar of Kontagor
- William Mahony, Irishman who served as Bishop of Roman Catholic Diocese of Ilorin
- William Porter, English born Archbishop of Cape Coast, Ghana

== See also ==
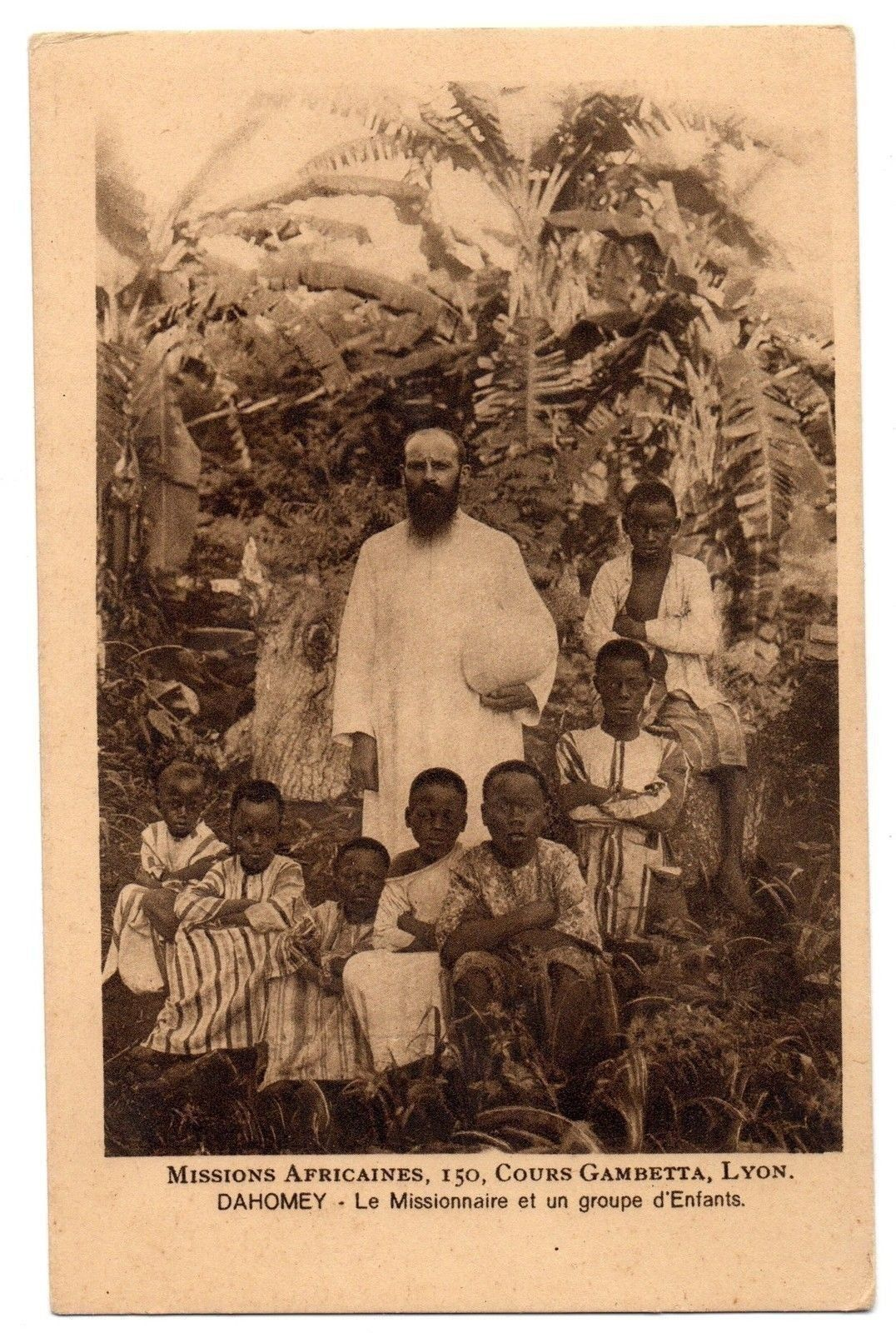
French missionary from the Society of African Missions in Dahomey (1930).

- African Museum of Lyon
- Ignatius Lissner
- Teresa Kearney
