= Mary Theodore Williams =

American Roman Catholic nun (1868–1931)

Mother Mary Theodore Williams FHM
- Mother Superior
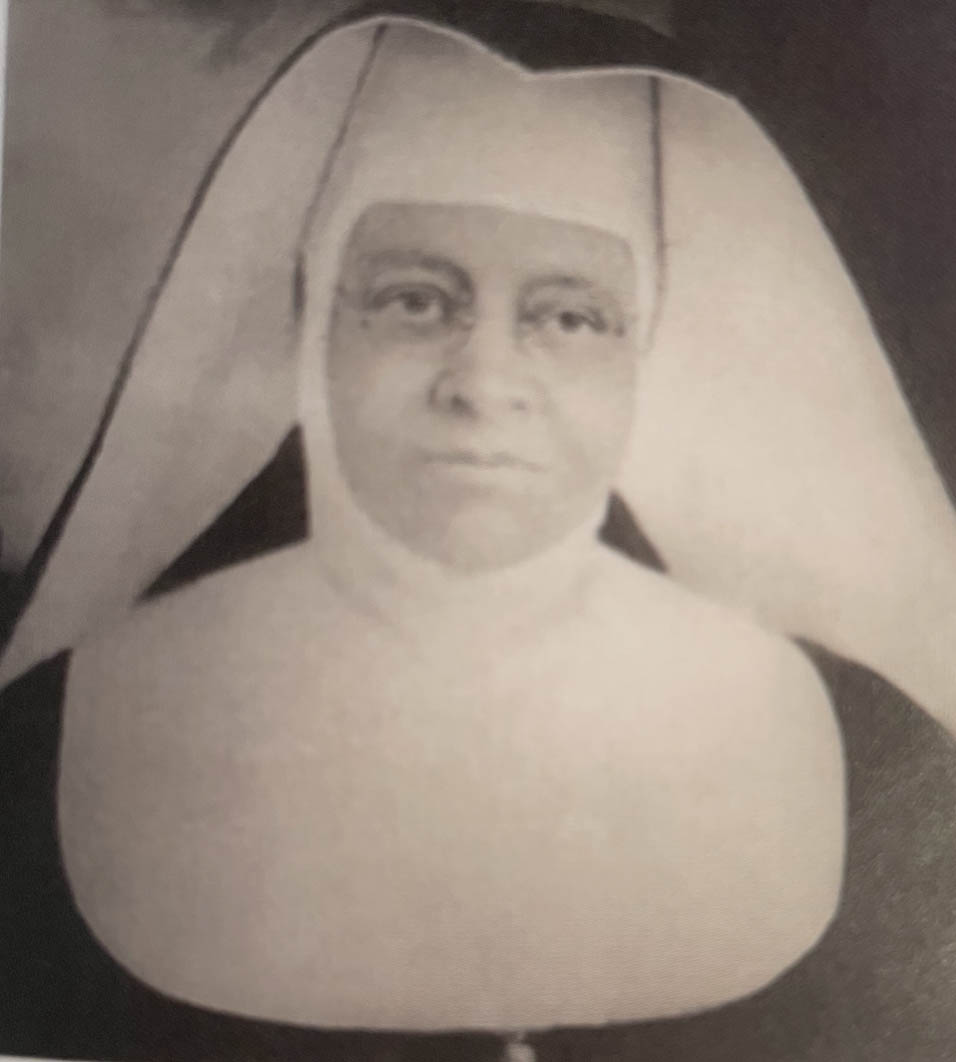
- Church: Catholic Church

Personal details
- Born: Elizabeth Barbara Williams; February 11, 1868 Baton Rouge, Louisiana
- Died: July 14, 1931 (aged 63) New York City
- Occupation: Teacher

Mary Theodore Williams, F.H.M. (born Elizabeth Barbara Williams; February 11, 1868 – July 14, 1931) was an American Black Catholic nun who founded the Franciscan Handmaids of the Most Pure Heart of Mary in 1916.

== Biography ==
Born on February 11, 1868, in Baton Rouge, Louisiana, Williams received her education from the "Ladies of the Sacred Heart" and from the Sisters of the Holy Family, second oldest society of African-American religious in the United States.

At 19, Williams entered the Sisters of Saint Francis Convent in Convent, Louisiana. When that order was disbanded by Archbishop James Blenk in 1912, she entered the novitiate of the Oblate Sisters of Providence in Baltimore where she was received as a novice and given the name Sister Mary Theodore, and left the community to discern her vocation outside of religious life.

A 1915 bill in the Georgia Legislature proposed to forbid white teachers from instructing black children in public schools. It threatened the closure of joint schools founded by Father Lissner in Georgia and staffed by Franciscan Sisters of the Immaculate Conception. When two African-American congregations, the Oblate Sisters of Providence and the Holy Family Sisters, could supply no help, Lissner decided to form a new one.

In 1915, while working at Trinity College in Washington, she learned that Father Ignatius Lissner, provincial of the Fathers of the Society of African Missions, needed a religious to found a congregation of black sisters in Savannah. On October 15, 1916, Elizabeth Williams received the habit of the new order and took the name of Mother Mary Theodore.

The bill never passed, but the Sisters found little support in Georgia. They taught by day and, to supplement their meagre earnings, ran a laundry business at night and begged along the waterfront on weekends. In 1913, Archbishop Hayes of New York invited the sisters to run St. Benedict’s Nursery in Harlem. Thus the sisters decided in 1923 to move the motherhouse of the congregation to the Harlem in northern Manhattan, where it remains.

By 1925, there were sixteen members, eventually including women from the West Indies. In 1929, Mother Theodore had the congregation enrolled in the Franciscan family as members of the Third Order Regular, thus becoming the Franciscan Handmaids of the Most Pure Heart of Mary.

Mother Theodore died in New York in July 14, 1931.

== Personal life ==
Her cousin, John Plantevigne, became a priest with the Josephites, a society of priests formed to serve African Americans. He would also face difficulty involving Archbishop Blenk, when he was denied the opportunity to preach a mission in New Orleans in 1909; Blenk cited the possibility of a negative reaction from the city's White population.
