= Franciscan Handmaids of the Most Pure Heart of Mary =

Roman Catholic religious congregation for women

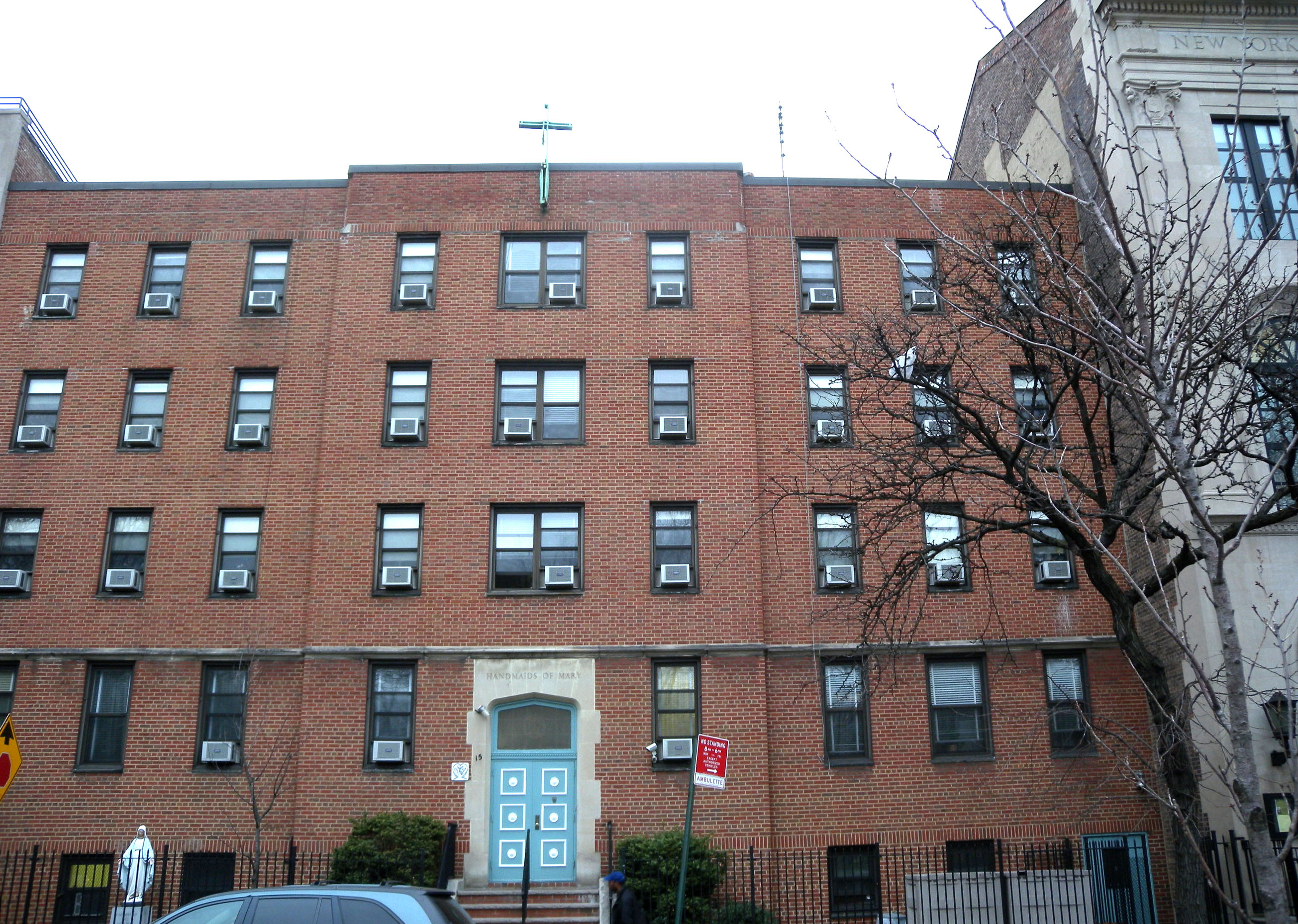
- Motherhouse in New York City as of 2010.
- Abbreviation: F.H.M.
- Formation: 1916
- Founders: Mary Theodore Williams & Ignatius Lissner
- Founded at: Savannah, Georgia
- Headquarters: New York City
- Parent organization: Catholic Church

The Franciscan Handmaids of the Most Pure Heart of Mary are a historically Black Catholic congregation of Religious Sisters co-founded by Mary Theodore Williams and Ignatius Lissner, S.M.A., in 1916. They follow the Rule of the Third Order Regular of St. Francis. Their primary mission has always been education, primarily of children of the African-American community.

== History ==
=== Foundress ===
Elizabeth Williams was born February 11, 1868, in Baton Rouge, Louisiana. She received her education from the Ladies of the Sacred Heart and the Sisters of the Holy Family, second oldest society of African-American Catholic religious in the United States. At 19, Williams entered the Sisters of Saint Francis' convent in Louisiana. When that order disbanded in 1912, she entered the novitiate of the Oblate Sisters of Providence in Baltimore where she was given the name Sister Mary Theodore.

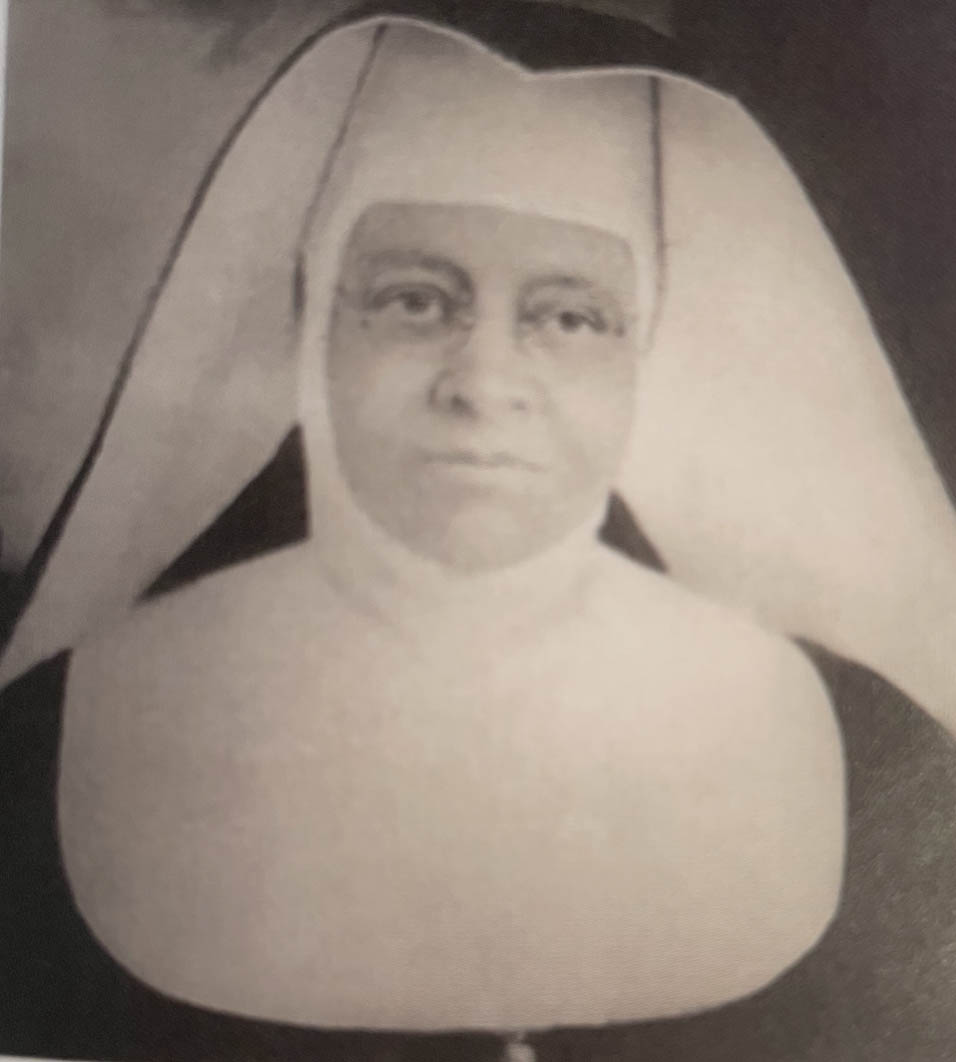
Mother Mary Theodore Williams, foundress of the Handmaids.

Around that time, a bill in the Georgia legislature proposed to forbid white teachers from instructing black children. It threatened the closure of schools co-founded by Ignatius Lissner in Georgia and staffed by Franciscan Sisters of the Immaculate Conception. When the two African-American congregations, the Oblate Sisters of Providence and the Holy Family Sisters, could supply no help, Lissner decided to form a new one. In 1915, while working at Trinity College in Washington, DC, Williams learned that Lissner, provincial of the Society of African Missions, needed a religious to found a congregation of black sisters in Savannah. On October 15, 1916, received the habit of the new order and took the name of Mother Mary Theodore.

The Georgia bill never passed, and the new sisters found little support. They taught by day and, to supplement their meagre earnings, ran a laundry business at night and begged along the waterfront on weekends. Thus, the sisters decided in 1924 to move the motherhouse of the congregation to Harlem in northern Manhattan, where it remains.

By 1925, there were sixteen members, eventually including women from the West Indies. In 1930, Williams had the congregation enrolled in the Franciscan family as members of the Third Order Regular, thus becoming the Franciscan Handmaids of the Most Pure Heart of Mary. During the Depression, the sisters established a soup kitchen.

Williams died in New York in August 1931.

=== Modern history ===
From 1952 to 2003 the sisters ran a summer camp on Staten Island, providing summer getaways for thousands of youth from New York City and North and South Carolina.

At its height in the 1960s, the congregation counted 80 sisters. As of 2010, there were 18 sisters, mostly age sixty or older. In 2014, the order's closing was anticipated, but encouraged by Pope Francis, the sisters extended their outreach to other parts of the United States, the Caribbean, and Africa. In 2017, there were twenty-four sisters, with seven in formation. The sisters then put the Harlem motherhouse up for sale, as there were only three sisters living there.

The sisters continue to operate St. Benedict’s Day Nursery. Founded in 1923 at the request of Patrick Cardinal Hayes, it celebrated its 85th anniversary in 2008. Initially providing custodial care, it became one of the first pre-school educational programs in the United States.

The St. Edward Food Pantry is another of the ministries of the sisters. The order has operated a food pantry on Staten Island since 1928. The food pantry collects food, clothing, gifts and toys for distribution during the Christmas season. The sisters serve in Harlem, Staten Island, Yonkers and Owerri, Nigeria.
