= Melchior de Marion Brésillac =

French Roman Catholic missionary and priest (1813–1859)

Venerable Melchior-Marie-Joseph de Marion-Brésillac SMA
- Vicar Apostolic of Sierra Leone; Titular Bishop of Prusa
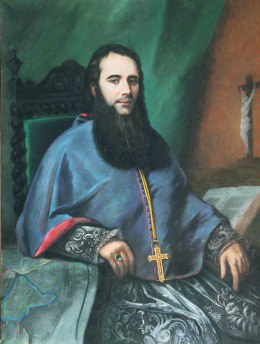
- Melchior de Marion Brésillac, Founder of the Society of African Missions
- Church: Roman Catholic Church
- Appointed: 13 April 1858
- Installed: 13 April 1858
- Term ended: 25 June 1859
- Successor: John Joseph O'Gorman
- Previous post: Vicar Apostolic of Coimbatore (1850-55)

Orders
- Ordination: 22 December 1838
- Consecration: 4 October 1846 by Clément Bonnand

Personal details
- Born: Melchior-Marie-Joseph de Marion-Brésillac; December 2, 1813 Castelnaudary, France
- Died: June 25, 1859 (aged 45) Freetown, Sierra Leone
- Buried: Chapel of the Society of African Missions in Lyon, France
- Denomination: Catholic

Sainthood
- Venerated in: Roman Catholic Church
- Attributes: Episcopal attire
- Patronage: Missionaries

Melchior-Marie-Joseph de Marion-Brésillac, S.M.A. (2 December 1813 – 25 June 1859) was a French Catholic prelate and the founder of the Society of African Missions.

== Early life and priesthood ==
Brésillac was born at Castelnaudary, France, on December 2, 1813. He was eldest of five children.

His family was of minor nobility, and he was raised in the Tridentine church.

He joined the seminary and was ordained as a priest on December 22, 1838. Brésillac served briefly as a parish priest in the parish of Saint-Michel in the town of his birth. However, the young priest felt dissatisfied and began to discern his calling to mission.

Both his bishop and his father opposed his desire to become a missionary, but Brésillac was determined and consecrated himself totally to that calling. Eventually, his bishop supported his choice, but the opposition of his father was so strong that the young priest left to enter the seminary of the Paris Foreign Missions without even saying goodbye to his family. He remained at the seminary for nine months then was appointed to Pondicherry in India where he arrived July 24, 1842.

== In India ==
=== Missionary to India ===
During his 12 years in India, Brésillac served in many capacities, as Curate at Salern and as Superior of the minor seminary at Pondicherry. This seminary later became as Petit Seminaire Higher Secondary School.

Fr.Marion was made the Titular Bishop of Prusa and later he became the provicar of Coimbatore.

His rise was swift, achieving the rank of bishop at age 29. Through it all, he cherished the desire to train Indian priests. He wanted to establish an indigenous clergy, with their own hierarchy, capable of taking on responsibility for the missions, with Europeans acting only as assistants.

=== Obstacles and challenges ===
Brésillac found his progressive ideas were strongly resisted by many of his fellow missionaries. He was also distressed by many of the cultural realities he discovered in India, particularly the caste system, a practice that assigned people to strictly defined social classes of "desirables" and "undesirables". Brésillac felt it was the obligation of any Christian to reject a system that made outcasts of human beings. He was appalled that so many of his fellow priests did not agree. They accepted this system as part of the culture of the people and opposed his democratic desire to train local clergy. Dismayed by this attitude and by the conflicts that the opposing views created within the community of missionaries, the young bishop eventually resigned his post and returned to Rome.

== Society of African Missions founding ==
Though deeply disappointed by the incident in India, Brésillac was undaunted in his missionary goals. While in Rome, he conceived his desire to bring the Gospel to "the most abandoned peoples of Africa." With the approval of the Holy See, he founded the Society of African Missions (Société des Missions Africaines, in French) (SMA Fathers) on December 8, 1856 in Lyon, France.

He spent the next two years recruiting and training his new missionaries. In 1858, the first SMA missionaries (priests and brothers) set out for what was the newly created Vicariate Apostolic of Sierra Leone in western Africa.

Their ship, the Danaé, was almost destroyed in a storm.

That first group was joined on May 14, 1859 by Brésillac who arrived with two more missionaries in Freetown, Sierra Leone. However, all of the SMA missionaries there succumbed to a yellow fever epidemic that raged through Freetown. Reportedly, all but one of the missionaries were dead within weeks of arriving.

== Death ==
Brésillac died of yellow fever, on June 25, 1859, only six weeks after he arrived in Africa, at an early age of 46. Despite the tragedy, the newly trained SMA missionary priests who had remained behind in France were still eager to go to Africa to carry out the mission started by their Founder. The work and vision of Brésillac continued under the care of his close friend and advisor, Fr. Augustin Planque.

== Candidacy for sainthood ==
Since January 1928, the remains of Brésillac have been interred in the chapel of the Society of African Missions in Lyon, France. He is a candidate for sainthood in the Roman Catholic Church, and the inquiry for his beatification was concluded in May 2000. All documents were handed over to the Congregation for the Causes of Saints and await further action.

Pope Francis named him as Venerable on 27 May 2020.

== Writings and posthumous publications ==
Bresillac wrote mainly in Latin and French. All his writings were translated into English and published towards the end of the twentieth century.

1. Melchior de Marion Brésillac, Faith Hope Charity: Spiritual exercises given to Indian Seminarians in 1853
2. Letters (Compilation of 922 letters written by Mgr de Brésillac)
3. Mission and foundation documents
4. Retreat to Missionaries
5. Souvenirs: Memories from twelve years on the missions (Vol Book 1)
6. Souvenirs: Memories from twelve years on the missions (Vol Book 2)
7. Souvenirs: Memories from twelve years on the missions (Vol Book 3)
8. Bruno Semplicio, De Marion Brésillac (1813-1859) Bishop and Founder of the Society of African Missions. (2007)

== Writings and posthumous publications in French ==
1. Melchior de Marion Brésillac, La foi l'espérance la charité
2. Melchior de Marion Brésillac, Mes pensées sur les missions
3. Melchior de Marion Brésillac, Journal d'un pionnier 1846 - 1859
4. Melchior de Marion Brésillac, Rapport à la-sacre congregation de la propagande
5. Melchior de Marion Brésillac, Les lettres de Mgr Melchior de Marion Brésillac
6. Melchior de Marion Brésillac, Documents de fondation des missions africaines
7. Bruno Semplicio, De Marion Brésillac (1813-1859) Evêque et Fondateur de la Société des Missions Africaines (2005)
