= Jean-Marie Coquard =

French Christian medical missionary

The Reverend Jean-Marie Coquard SMA
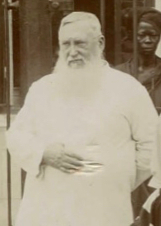
- Father Jean-Marie Coquard in Abeokuta, Nigeria, 1925
- Born: 27 November 1859; Diocese of Nantes, France
- Died: 27 June 1933 (aged 73); Abeokuta, Nigeria
- Known for: Medical missionary work

Jean-Marie Coquard, SMA (27 November 1859 – 27 June 1933) was a French Christian medical missionary who traveled to Abeokuta, Nigeria, which is the capital of the Ogun State, to provide surgery and care. He was supervisor and visitor at the Abeokuta missionary and doctor to the Egba Government and Royal Family. He established the Sacred Heart Hospital in Abeokuta, and was the longest serving missionary of the Society of African Missions, receiving an OBE for his work.

== Early life and family ==
Jean-Marie Coquard was born on 27 November 1859, in the Diocese of Nantes, France into a Catholic working-class family. Coquard was the second child and only son of Marie Louise and Francois-Marie Coquard, a paludier and cattle farmer. A few years after his birth, Coquard's family moved to the hamlet of Fontainebras. However, much of Coquard early life and schooling took place in the village of Mesquer, where he attended the school of the Brothers of Christian Instruction. Then, at fourteen, Coquard enrolled in the merchant navy, where he first developed his love for the sea and desire to travel.

== Career ==
At the age of 24, while in Montevideo with the merchant navy, Coquard encountered the Sacred Heart Missionaries of Betharram, a group of Christian missionaries that ran a school. Given his interest in a priestly calling as well as the idea of becoming a missionary, Coquard commenced schooling in Montevideo for the next four years. However, in 1886, Coquard learned that he was rejected as a candidate for priesthood with the Sacred Heart Missionaries. Coquard took rejection from Sacred Heart as a direction from God to go to Africa. He applied and was accepted to the Society of African Missions. In 1890, Coquard sailed to West Africa.

Coquard was ordained a priest in 1880. He left Europe in November the same year after a formal departure ceremony which the Cardinal Archbishop of Lyon attended. The Archbishop honored ten missionaries all leaving for Africa by kissing their feet. When they landed in Lagos after twenty-five days at sea, Coquard was greeted by excited school children and stood in awe at the benediction. He wrote in a letter to Rev. Father Planque, superior-general of the African missions of Lyons, “it is impossible to describe the joy of my Christians.”

Upon his arrival in Abeokuta in 1890, Coquard was put in charge of medical work at the mission dispensary under the guidance of Fr. Justin François. Four days after Coquard's arrival, he was left as the mission supervisor while François was traveling.

With the exception of a five-week apprenticeship, Coquard was largely self-taught. Although he had received no formal medical training, he reportedly demonstrated an extraordinary interest and ability for medical work. At the mission, there were no actual medical professionals, but they received permission from the Propaganda Fide for the clergy to perform surgery. Coquard became sought-after and beloved among the Egba people. In 1893, he was officially put in charge of the dispensary.

He also sought to help the lepers who were forced to live outside the city. He and Father François wanted to build a more permanent home for them, a goal they worked toward for six years. Finally in 1897, the leprosarium was realized.

Coquard wrote frequently to Le Petit Messager to gain support for various mission projects. He described the Egba people living in Abeokuta and stressed that often patients left the mission not only cured of illness but also converted. In response to his articles, European readers of the journal sent him medical equipment and books as well as church props such as altar cloths. In his letters to the Messenger, Coquard focused on the difference Christianity could have on the children taken into the orphanage at the mission and encouraged the sponsoring of individual children.

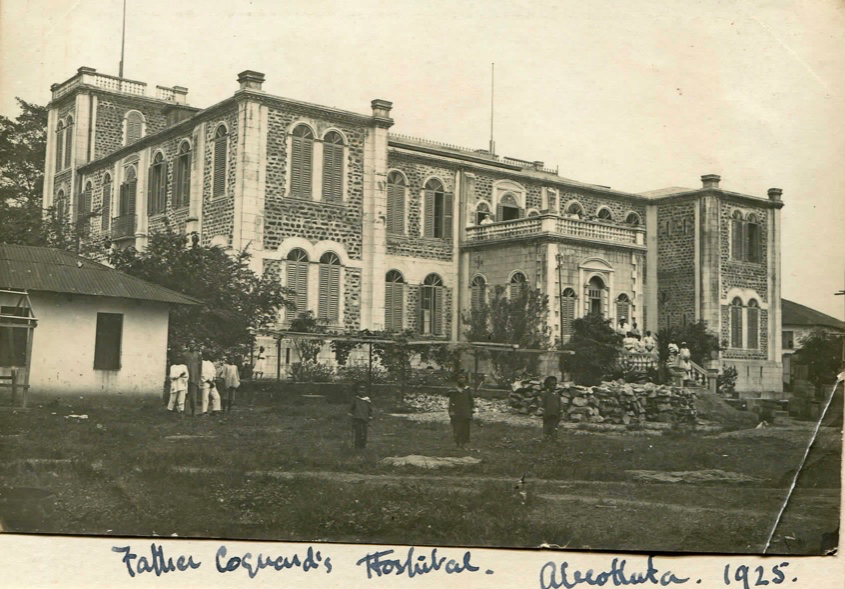
Father Coquard's hospital, Abeokuta, 1925

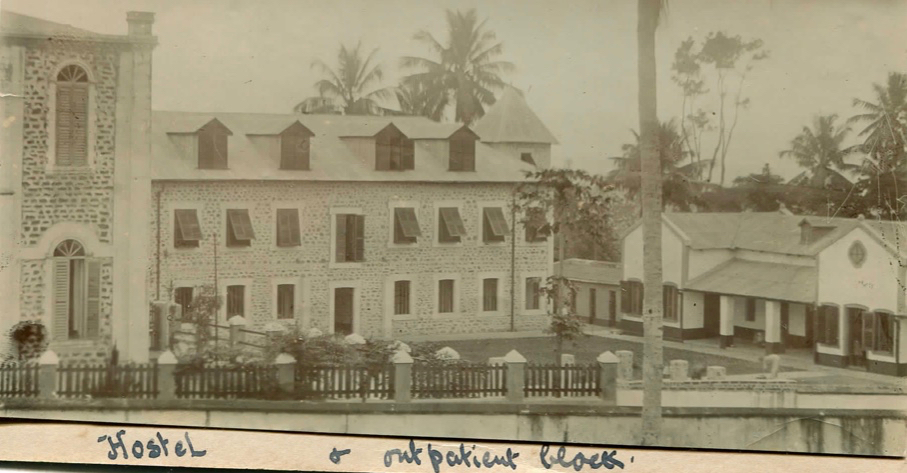
Hostel and out-patient block of Coquard's hospital, 1925

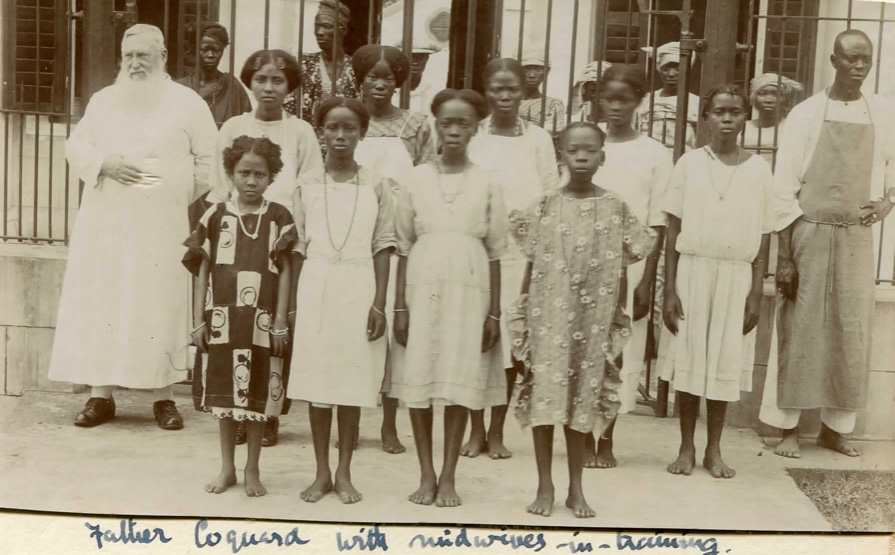
Father Coquard with trainee midwives 1925

Coquard was convinced of the importance of his medical work for the mission, and he began advocating for the hospital despite the blatant lack of resources. The mission began accepting payment for medical care at the request of one of the Egba chiefs who wanted to ensure that the Egba people would receive proper care. The funds were a considerable help since the mission was barely staying afloat, and the financial boost allowed Coquard's hospital to be approved. Coquard used a portion of the funds that were specifically designated for the leprosarium, for which he was criticized by many. The hospital was eventually completed in 1895.

After the death of Father François in 1895, Coquard became the superior in Abeokuta. However, the following year when it became apparent that he wasn't following certain restrictions, he was sent to South America to fundraise. He was angry about being forced out of his position, but intended to return. As for the actual fundraising work, he called it pitiable since the people he was requesting donations from were so poor. He came back with an idea as well as the funding for a Christian village. He used the new project as a way to ensure his continued position at the mission, and in 1902, he was named visitor, responsible for the spiritual welfare of the confreres. He began advocating for an addition to the leprosarium and for a newer hospital in 1903. His plans were for a grand two story hospital building. Bishop Lang found the layout including towers and terraces excessive and Bishop Paul Pellet ordered Coquard to only build a one-story building, but Coquard began construction without their approval. The Egba government and the Egba people held him in high regard and supported the construction of the new hospital. Although Coquard's strong personality often put him at odds with Society of African Missions leaders, Coquard's labor and medical work culminated in the establishment of the Sacred Heart Hospital. On May 5, 1911, with the Alake, his court, and members of the government in attendance, the new Sacred Heart Hospital was opened by the governor of Lagos, Sir Walter Egerton, who had also laid the foundation stone in 1904.

Coquard decided it would be best if the hospital was put under a doctor's supervision while he just continued with administration work. However, instead of the government continuing the hospital's existence as initially planned, the Wuerzburg Institute ended up providing staff for the hospital.

In 1917, orders from the Propaganda Fide prevented Coquard from practicing first-aid. In his anger, Coquard wrote letters that were offensive to many high-standing mission leaders. Because Coquard had brought the mission into debt, repeatedly disobeyed Bishop Terrien's orders and was now disrespecting his supervisors, many wanted him to be removed. In 1919, Coquard resigned from his position as superior of the Abeokuta mission. He was recalled to France, but the Egba people petitioned for him to stay.

In 1923, he tried to implement a nursing sisterhood since there were so many women, both young and old, who spent their lives working at the hospital but never earned a degree. He did open a school for midwives two years later that in 1998 became a general nursing school.

== Death and legacy ==
In 1933, Coquard died in Abeokuta. He is remembered for his 43 years of missionary work in Yorubaland, only returning to Europe twice. He bronze statue was erected in front of the original hospital in Coquard's honor. The following day, a mass was held to repose his soul.
