= First Wike Executive Council =

- Cabinet of Rivers State
- 5 June 2015 – 24 June 2017
- Date formed: 5 June 2015
- Date dissolved: 24 June 2017

People and organisations
- Governor: Ezenwo Wike
- Deputy Governor: Ipalibo Banigo
- Member party: People's Democratic Party
- Status in legislature: PDP led government
- Opposition party: All Progressives Congress

History
- Election: Rivers State gubernatorial election, 2015
- Legislature term: 8th Rivers State House of Assembly
- Budgets: 2016 budget; 2017 budget
- Successor: Second Wike Executive Council

The First Wike Executive Council was the Executive Council of Rivers State between 5 June 2015 and 24 June 2017. It was led by Governor Ezenwo Nyesom Wike with Ipalibo Banigo as Vice-Chairman. The first set of appointments to the cabinet were made on 5 June 2015. The designees included Kenneth Kobani, Chukwuemeka Woke, Emmanuel C. Aguma, Fred Kpakol, Onimim Jacks, Emmanuel Okah and Opunabo Inko-Tariah. Governor Wike appointed Desmond Akawor, Ambassador to South Korea, to serve as Administrator of the Greater Port Harcourt City Development Authority.

On 16 July 2015, former Permanent Secretary of Rivers State Ministry of Environment Rufus Godwins was sworn in as the Head of Service.

Further appointments to the Wike Executive Council were announced formally on 20 November 2015 and included 20 commissioner nominees, all of whom were confirmed by the Rivers State House of Assembly and sworn in on December 18.

== Executive Council members ==
The Wike Executive Council was composed of the following members:

Office	Incumbent	Term began
Governor	Ezenwo Nyesom Wike	29 May 2015
Deputy Governor	Ipalibo Banigo	29 May 2015
Attorney General	Emmanuel C. Aguma	June 2015
Secretary to the State Government	Kenneth Kobani	June 2015
Chief of Staff	Chukwuemeka Woke	June 2015
Head of Service	Rufus Godwins	July 2015
Director-General of the Bureau of Public Procurement	Igonibo E. Thompson	February 2016
Media and Publicity Special Adviser	Opunabo Inko-Tariah	June 2015
Administrator (GPHCDA)	Desmond Akawor	June 2015
Commissioner of Agriculture	Onimim Jacks	June 2015
Commissioner of Budget and Economic Planning	Isaac Kamalu	December 2015
Commissioner of Chieftaincy and Community Affairs	John Bazia	December 2015
Commissioner of Commerce and Industry	Bright Jacob	December 2015
Commissioner of Culture And Tourism	Tonye Briggs-Oniyide	December 2015
Commissioner of Education	Kaniye Ebeku	December 2015
Commissioner of Employment Generation and Empowerment	Ephraim Nwuzi	December 2015
Commissioner of Energy and Natural resources	Shedrack Chukwu	December 2015
Commissioner of Environment	Roseline Konya	December 2015
Commissioner of Finance	Fred Kpakol	June 2015
Commissioner of Health	Theophilus Odagme	December 2015
Commissioner of Housing	Emmanuel Okah	June 2015
Commissioner of Information and Communications	Austin Tam George	December 2015
Commissioner of Justice	Emmanuel C. Aguma	June 2015
Commissioner of Land and Survey		December 2015
Commissioner of Local Government Affairs	Rodaford Long-John	December 2015
Commissioner of Power	Mike Anwuri	December 2015
Commissioner of Social Welfare & Rehabilitation	Damiete H. Miller	December 2015
Commissioner of Special Duties	Monday Onyezonwu	December 2015
Commissioner of Sports	Boma Iyaye	December 2015
Commissioner of Transport	Hon. Ibinabo Michael West	March 2018
Commissioner of Urban Development	Chinyere Igwe	December 2015
Commissioner of Water Resources and Rural Development	Walter Ibibia	December 2015
Commissioner of Women Affairs	Ukel Oyaghiri	December 2015
Commissioner of Works	Bathuel Harrison Iheanyichukwu	May 2016
Commissioner of Youth Development	Prince Ogbogbula	December 2015

== Resignations, suspensions and dismissals ==
Media and Publicity Special Adviser, Sir Opunabo Inko-Tariah resigned his cabinet position in a letter of resignation dated 6 November 2015. Inko-Tariah stated that unfolding developments in the state indicated that his services were no longer needed.

On 12 February 2016, Commissioner of Finance, Fred Kpakol along with Accountant General Abere Dagogo were temporarily relieved of their duties. The suspension lasted until 15 February before being lifted following interventions by different political leaders. Governor Ezenwo Nyesom Wike also suspended Kelvin Wachukwu indefinitely from his post as Commissioner of Works. The reasons given included negligence, dereliction of duty and poor project supervision. Wachukwu was replaced by Bathuel Harrison Iheanyichukwu, who was officially sworn into the Cabinet on 9 May.

On 31 August 2016, four commissioners, a special adviser and the Head of Service were handed a suspension of 3 months each for unstated reasons. The commissioners suspended from office were the Commissioner of Culture and Tourism Tonye Briggs-Oniyide, Commissioner of Finance Fred Kpakol, Commissioner of Sports Boma Iyaye and Commissioner of Chieftaincy and Community Affairs John Bazia. Others suspended included the Head of Service Rufus Godwins and Anugbum Onuoha, Special Adviser on Lands. Further reports, however, revealed that the Governor had taken his decision following an Executive Council meeting in August "which the officials attended late". They were later recalled to their various offices on 16 September that year.

On 15 February 2017, Theophilus Odagme was dismissed from the office of Commissioner of Health. He was the second commissioner dismissed openly from the cabinet. On 22 June 2017, Wike fired Bathuel Harrison Iheanyichukwu from the post of Commissioner of Works, making him the second cabinet official in that ministry to be removed from office. A day after Harrison's abrupt removal, Commissioner of Information and Communications Austin Tam-George handed in his letter of resignation.

The Executive Council was dissolved on 24 June 2017.

== See also ==
- Government of Rivers State
- Timeline of the governorship of Ezenwo Nyesom Wike
