= Timeline of the Nyesom Wike governorship =

The following is a timeline of the governorship of Ezenwo Nyesom Wike, also known as the Wike administration, from his inauguration as Governor of Rivers State on 29 May 2015 to 29 May 2023.

== 2015 ==
=== May – August ===
- 29 May – Wike sworn in as 6th Governor of Rivers State; delivers speech. As first moves, Governor Wike appoints acting Chief Judge, Customary Court of Appeal President, directs state courts to resume work and reinstates fired lecturers of the University of Science and Technology.
- 30 May – Image surfaces online of Governor Wike and family.
- 31 May – Thanksgiving service for Governor Wike takes place. The Governor reveals that past administration had vandalized the Government House.
- 1 June – Governor Wike issues financial independence declaration for the Judiciary, inaugurates 8th Rivers State House of Assembly.
- 2 June – Governor Wike announces plans to complete the University of Science and Technology Law Faculty building. He summons all Permanent Secretaries to give account on past expenditure.
- 5 June – Kenneth Kobani is appointed Secretary to the State Government while Chukwuemeka Woke is made Chief of Staff. Felix A. Obuah, Chairman of the Rivers State People's Democratic Party takes over Waste Management Agency. The Governor's appointments of four commissioners and seven special advisers get confirmed by the House.
- 8 June – Governor Wike receives authorization from the Rivers State House of Assembly to dismiss all members of the Independent Electoral Commission and Judicial Service Commission.
- 11 June – The Rivers State House of Assembly grants Governor Wike's request to borrow ₦10 billion (approximately US$50,276,600) to finance vital development projects in the state. Governor Wike also expresses commitment to halt multiple taxation.
- 12 June – Governor Wike administers the Oath of Office to his first set of appointees. They include Kenneth Kobani, Secretary to the State Government, Chukwuemeka Woke, Chief of Staff, Emmanuel C. Aguma, Attorney General and Fred Kpakol, Finance Commissioner. Others are Emmanuel Okah, Housing Commissioner, Onimim Jacks, Agriculture Commissioner, and Sir. Opunabo Inko-Tariah, Media and Publicity Special Adviser.
- 15 June – Governor Wike dissolves all boards of parastatals and agencies with the exception of the Rivers State Waste Management Agency and the Greater Port Harcourt City Development Authority. Road contractors in Port Harcourt receive directives from the Governor to return to site and complete all abandoned projects.
- 17 June – Governor Wike issues an order demanding immediate dismissal of 344 staff members, including lecturers of the Rivers State Polytechnic.
- 19 June – Governor Wike appoints a Judicial Commission of Inquiry under the chairmanship of Justice George Omereji to inquire into the sale of valued assets and funds withdrawal by the preceding administration of Chibuike Amaechi.
- 20 June – Governor Wike proclaims himself a "Local Champion", claims he masterminded the election of former Rivers State Chief Executive Amaechi.
- 21 June – Governor Wike relieves the General Manager of Radio Rivers Mediline Tador of duties and names Sampson Fiberesima as replacement.
- 22 June – In his first meeting with civil servants at State Secretariat, Port Harcourt, Governor Wike gives assurance that efforts are underway to ensure regular payment of salaries. The Governor refutes a recent report that he ordered the sack of 344 employees of the State Polytechnic, describing it as a propaganda to cast a negative light on his government.
- 25 June – Governor Wike pays homage to Sir Celestine Omehia while officially restoring all rights and entitlements of the former governor. Governor Wike commissions South Africa visa application center in Rivers State capital, Port Harcourt.
- 26 June – The Governor launches committee to take primary responsibility for the organisation of the 2016 Olympic soccer qualifiers holding in Port Harcourt on 18 and 19 July.
- 27 June – Governor Wike makes unscheduled visits to Bori General Hospital and Emohua General Hospital. He pledges to give the facilities the boost they need to function efficiently. The managements of Dolphins F.C. and Sharks F.C. laud the Governor for clearing all outstanding salaries owed the clubs.
- 28 June – Governor Wike announces plans for amendments to the Rivers State Anti-Kidnapping bill to toughen the punishment for those who commit kidnapping or sponsor the crime. Senator George Sekibo, members of the State Executive Council accompany the Governor on a condolence visit to the family of late King Adele.
- 29 June – A commendation praising corps members for their significant contributions to the success of the 2015 elections is issued by Governor Wike.
- 30 June – The Governor tours the facilities of Indorama Eleme Petrochemicals Ltd. in Port Harcourt to endorse the Fertilizer Plant project. Rivers State House of Assembly approves additional ₦20 billion (approximately US$100,553,200) loan for road maintenance as well as construction.
- 1 July – Governor Wike orders payment of 2-month salary arrears to all employees in the Rivers State Civil Service. 14 of Governor Wike's nominees to the State Judicial Service Commission, Civil Service Commission and State Independent Electoral Commission win House approval.
- 2 July – Rivers State House of Assembly authorizes dissolution of Rivers State Local Government Service Commission. The Governor calls for thorough probe into the activities of certain commissions in the state government.
- 3 July – Governor Wike disbands Local Government Service Commission and holds first Brick House meeting with the Rivers State Commissioner of Police Chris Ezike over security.
- 4 July – Acting on instructions from the Governor, Accountant General commences payment of 3 months pension arrears to government retirees.
- 9 July – Governor Wike renames Rivers State Polytechnic to Kenule Beeson Saro-Wiwa Polytechnic as a permanent tribute in honor of the late activist, Ken Saro-Wiwa. Following a court judgment removing local government Chairs and Councillors illegally elected 23 May 2015, replacements appointed by Governor Wike, confirmed by the House are sworn in to fill up the vacancies.
- 11 July – Governor Wike unveils initiative aimed at reconstructing a portion of the East West Road connecting Onne seaport using the expertise of Reynolds Construction Company (RCC) in partnership with the federal government and port stakeholders. Later, Governor Wike and Speaker Ikuinyi O. Ibani attend a special French national day event.
- 12 July – The Governor embarks on inspection of roads, the Faculty of Law Building project and charges contractors at work to deliver on schedule. The Oroekpo community in Rumuepirikom holds a Service of Thanksgiving for the Governor at St. Peter's Anglican Church.
- 14 July – Governor Wike pays the Rivers State Police Command headquarters a visit and inaugurates the Traffic Decongestion Committee. Governor Wike also meets with the executive board of the Oil and Gas Free Zone at the Brick House.
- 15 July – Various firms allying with the Wike administration in its efforts to repair the 6-kilometre stretch of the Eleme Junction to Onne Exit Point of the East West Road sign a memorandum of understanding. Governor Wike conducts an inspection of the revamped Port Harcourt Refining Company.
- 16 July – Governor Wike officially installs Rufus Godwins as Head of Service to take over from Samuel Longjohn who has held the office since 9 October 2012.
- 17 July – Governor Wike attends last training session of the Nigerian Under-23 at the 40,000-capacity Adokiye Amiesimaka Stadium ahead of the team's Olympic qualifying match against Congo.
- 18 July – The Governor issues a directive ordering Housing Commissioner Emmanuel Okah to oust unauthorised occupants and squatters from the public housing estate at Iriebe.
- 21 July – Governor Wike meets with Shell Nigeria executives at the Brick House, discussing the relationship between some oil companies and their host communities.
- 28 July – Speaking during a meeting with the leadership of DAAR Communications Plc, Governor Wike urges media practitioners to remain resolute but fair in their reportage. A total amount of ₦712 million (approximately US$3,578,789) is provided as funding for Riverian students abroad studying via the Rivers State Sustainable Development Agency scholarship program.
- 30 July – Governor Wike heads to Abonnema in Akuku-Toru local government area where he inspects the construction progress of township road and the bridge linking the town with Obonoma. The Governor appoints Blessing Didia and Boma Oruwari as acting Vice-Chancellor and Deputy Vice-Chancellor respectively of Rivers State University of Science and Technology.
- 3 August – Samuel Kalagbor becomes the interim Provost of Rivers State College of Arts and Science, following the sacking of Hillary Wordu. Governor Wike appoints Joe Akpa as the Senior Special Assistant on Protocol.
- 4 August – Governor Wike contributes 64 operational vehicles to security agencies to help tackle crime in Rivers State. Inspector-General of Police, Solomon Arase visits the Governor at the Brick House.
- 7 August – Governor Wike assents to three bills passed by the Rivers State House of Assembly. The bills are the Rivers State Kenule Beeson Saro-Wiwa Polytechnic, Bori (Amendment) Law, 2015, the Rivers State Kidnap (Prohibition) Amendment Law, 2015 and the Rivers State Traditional Rulers Law No.4 of 2015.
- 9 August – Accountant General, Ngozi Abu is removed and is succeeded by Director of Treasury, Dagogo R. Abere.
- 11 August – Governor Wike launches the commencement of the construction of Elimgbu-Rumuewhara-Rumunduru-Eliozu road in Obio-Akpor local government area.
- 14 August – Governor Wike meets with Chief of Naval Staff, Vice Admiral Ibok Ibas, pledging support for the Nigerian Navy to secure the state's waterways. The Governor also held talks with Irish Ambassador Sean Hoy on promotion of trade and investment between Ireland and Rivers State.
- 15 August – Governor Wike attends the funeral service of Chief Eze Wobo Onunwor of Oropotoma at the Saint Michael's Anglican Church, Rumuomasi.
- 18 August – The Governor welcomes Archbishop of the Niger Delta Province of the Anglican Church, Archbishop Ignatius Kattey to the Brick House.
- 21 August – The Governor relieves Rosamund Osahagulu from the post of Vice-Chancellor of Ignatius Ajuru University.

=== September – December ===
- 1 September – Governor Wike declares open the Alice Okolo Bridge in Akuku-Toru connecting the towns of Abonnema and Obonoma.
- 2 September – Governor Wike inaugurates the Law Faculty Building of the Rivers State University of Science and Technology. Governor Wike commissions the 1.1-kilometre Iloabuchi–Eagle Island road in Port Harcourt (local government area).
- 3 September – Governor Wike formally opens rehabilitated Mbano Camp–Old Aba Road to Komkom Railway in Oyigbo.
- 4 September – Governor Wike unveils the Oyigbo Market Road then dedicates 50 units of 3 bedroom moderate-income housing at the new Satellite Town, Iriebe, Obio-Akpor.
- 5 September – Governor Wike commemorates his first 100 days as Rivers State's 6th Governor, thanking his staff and detailing priorities for the coming months.
- 8 September – Governor Wike participates in a re-election campaign rally for Henry Dickson at Samson Siasia Stadium and meets with former President Goodluck Jonathan.
- 13 September – In his speech in Port Harcourt during the second plenary meeting of the Catholic Bishops' Conference of Nigeria, Governor Wike reveals that his administration will assist the Catholic Church in reviving her missionary schools and making them centres of excellence as started by former Governor Peter Odili.
- 18 September – Governor Wike sets up task force to clamp down on haphazard parking of fuel tanker trucks along Nnamdi Azikiwe Road and adjoining streets.
- 24 October – The results of the 2015 gubernatorial election in Rivers State announced by the Independent National Electoral Commission is declared void by Election Tribunal.
- 16 December – Court of Appeal upholds Election Tribunal verdict and orders that fresh elections be held. The Governor calls on his supporters to remain calm then instructs his lawyers to appeal the ruling at the Supreme Court.
- 18 December – Governor Wike presents his proposed 2016 budget to the House.
- 21 December – House confirms Lawrence Macaulay Pepple as acting chief executive officer of the Rivers State Sustainable Development Agency.
- 23 December – Shortly after returning from a trip to the Federal Capital Territory, Governor Wike nominates two Caretaker Committee chairs for Ogba–Egbema–Ndoni and Etche.
- 24 December – Governor Wike sends out a yuletide message to the people of Rivers State ahead of Christmas Day celebrations.

== 2016 ==
=== January – April ===
- 14 January – Governor Wike nominates Adama Lamikanra as acting Chief Judge of Rivers State to replace retiring Daisy W. Okocha.
- 18 January – Governor Wike orders immediate payment of health workers' salary arrears.
- 27 January – The Supreme Court sets aside an earlier Court of Appeal ruling that voided the April 11 gubernatorial election in the state.
- 2 February – Governor Wike proclaims his Supreme Court Victory Day (27 January), as a state holiday.
- 21 February – Governor Wike congratulates David Mark on his election success.
- 5 March – Deputy Governor Banigo travels to Bonny Kingdom to talk on water transport infrastructure.
- 25 April – Justice Christy Gabriel Nwankwo becomes substantive President of the Customary Court of Appeal.

=== May – August ===
- 10 May – Governor Wike fires Works Commissioner Kelvin Wachukwu for negligence, dereliction of duty and poor project supervision. That same day, he appoints Bathuel Harrison Iheanyichukwu as replacement.
- 11 June – The Governor gives his opening address at the 12th Africa Movie Academy Awards, calling on actors, producers, directors and scriptwriters to serve as promoters of the state as the investors' destination of Africa with important economic benefits.
- 29 June – Governor Wike offers his condolences on the death of literary icon Elechi Amadi.
- 30 June – Governor Wike hosts members of the Port Harcourt Male Ensemble at the Government House, praising the group's contributions to the state.
- 31 August – The Commissioner of Culture and Tourism Tonye Briggs-Oniyide, Commissioner of Finance Fred Kpakol, Commissioner of Sports Boma Iyaye, Commissioner of Chieftaincy and Community Affairs John Bazia, Head of Service Rufus Godwins and Anugbum Onuoha, Special Adviser on Lands get suspended over habitual tardiness during cabinet meetings.

=== September – December ===
- 17 September – Governor Wike signs a bill into law extending the tenure of local government caretaker committees to nine months.
- 6 November – Governor Wike holds a joint press conference at Government House with People's Democratic Party leaders, claiming that members of the All Progressives Congress had printed fake ballot papers in an effort to rig their way to victory in the 2016 legislative election rerun.
- 18 November – The Governor joins First Lady Eberechi to honor the 2016 Women's Federation Cup champion Rivers Angels in a ceremony at the Government House.
- 28 December – The Wike administration proposes a golden jubilee budget of ₦470 billion for fiscal year 2017.

== 2017 ==
=== January – April ===
- 1 January – The Governor gives his celebratory New Year's message, reiterating his commitment to promote peace and development.
- 13 February – Governor Wike welcomes Acting President Yemi Osibanjo to the state dinner in his honor at the banquet hall of the Government House.
- 15 February – Governor Wike removes Theophilus Odagme from his position as Health Commissioner.
- 18 February – Governor Wike receives the Governor of the Year Award from national newspaper The Sun.
- 26 April – Governor and First Lady make a surprise visit to the Creek Road Market in Port Harcourt to purchase beads, wrappers and household cooking items.

=== May – August ===
- 18 May – Governor Wike, with the First Lady, and their son, make an extensive tour of the Port Harcourt Pleasure Park ahead of opening.
- 20 May – Governor Wike attends the Golden Jubilee Cultural Festival at the Sharks Stadium, and delivers a speech in support of culture enhancement and preservation.
- 24 May – Family, friends and dignitaries gather at the Brick House to celebrate the First Lady's 45th birthday.
- 26 May – Governor Wike announces in a speech during the opening ceremony of the Port Harcourt Pleasure Park that he will build a movie theater to complement the facilities there.
- 27 May – Governor Wike presents awards for service to honorees during the Excellent Achievers' Golden Jubilee ceremony marking 50 years since the creation of Rivers State. Former governor Peter Odili pays tribute to Governor Wike, and bestows on him the Grand Service Star.
- 31 May – The People's Democratic Party caucus of the 8th National Assembly endorse Governor Wike for second term.
- 13 June – During the course of a state banquet for United States Ambassador to Nigeria, William Symington, Governor Wike spoke about the need to entrench true fiscal federalism in the country.
- 22 June – Bathuel Harrison is abruptly removed from office, making him the second Works Commissioner to be dismissed by the Wike administration.
- 23 June – Information and Communications Commissioner Austin Tam-George resigns from his cabinet position.
- 24 June – In a move to provide a fresh slate for the next phase of his administration, Governor Wike sends all commissioners in the executive council on a compulsory administrative leave.
- 29 June – House confirms Emmanuel C. Aguma as Attorney General and Commissioner of Justice.
- 2 July – Governor Wike delivers a keynote address at the 20th National Convention of the Ogbakor Ikwerre at the Crowne Plaza Atlanta Airport Hotel, expressing his disapproval of former governor Chibuike Amaechi's job performance.
- 8 July – Governor Wike swears in Emmanuel C. Aguma as the Attorney General and Commissioner of Justice and urges him to ensure that former Majority Leader of the House, Chidi Lloyd, is duly prosecuted for the attempted murder of Michael Chinda.
- 9 July – Governor Wike arrives in Enugu for the inaugural meeting of the South East South South Governors Forum.
- 25 July – Governor Wike inaugurates the reconstruction and rehabilitation work of local roads serving the neighborhoods of Abuloma, Fimie, Ozuboko and Amadi-Ama.
- 30 July – Hotel Novotel's certificate of occupancy is revoked.

=== September – December ===
- 5 October – Governor Wike holds private talks in the Government House with the Bayelsa State Governor Henry Dickson to discuss security and improving economic relations between both states.
- 7 October – Governor Wike meets with Enugu State Governor Ifeanyi Ugwuanyi privately in Enugu to discuss regional integration.
- 10 October – Okorite Carrie Adiele, Caretaker Committee Chair of Degema is sworn in by the Governor, becoming the first woman to hold the position.
- 3 November – Governor Wike visits the Financial Times headquarters in London and discusses partnership on matters including promotion of investment opportunities in Rivers State.
- 11 November – Governor Wike survives possible assassination attempt.

== See also ==
- Wike Cabinet
- Rivers State gubernatorial election, 2015
