= Second Wike Executive Council =

- Cabinet of Rivers State
- Incumbent
- Date formed: 29 June 2017

People and organisations
- Governor: Ezenwo Nyesom Wike
- Deputy Governor: Ipalibo Banigo
- Member party: People's Democratic Party
- Status in legislature: PDP led government
- Opposition party: APC
- Opposition leader: Chibuike Amaechi

History
- Election: Rivers State gubernatorial election, 2015
- Legislature term: 8th Rivers State House of Assembly
- Predecessor: First Wike Executive Council

The second Wike Executive Council is the current Executive Council of Rivers State led by Ezenwo Nyesom Wike of the People's Democratic Party. It began to take shape following the House approval of Emmanuel C. Aguma as the Attorney General and Commissioner of Justice of the Rivers State government. It replaces the First Wike Executive Council which was dissolved on 24 June 2017. Among the commissioner-designees as of 8 August 2017 are seven former commissioners who served in the preceding Executive Council.

On 20 September, Governor Ezenwo Nyesom Wike assigned portfolios to 19 commissioners, with Emmanuel Okah as his Commissioner of Information and Communications. Former Secretary of the Rivers State People's Democratic Party Walter Ibibia was moved to the Ministry of Transport. Roseline Konya retained her previous position as Commissioner of Environment. Fred Kpakol, Boma Iyaye, Tonye Briggs-Oniyide, Damiete H. Miller and Ukel Oyaghiri were all returned to their past ministries.

== Executive Council ==
The second Executive Council is currently composed of the following members:

Office	Incumbent	Term began
Governor	Ezenwo Wike	29 May 2015
Deputy Governor	Ipalibo Banigo	29 May 2015
Attorney General	Emmanuel C. Aguma	July 2017
Secretary to the State Government	Kenneth Kobani	June 2015
Chief of Staff	Chukwuemeka Woke	June 2015
Head of Service	Rufus Godwins	July 2015
Administrator (GPHCDA)	Desmond Akawor	June 2015
Commissioner of Agriculture	Charles Nwogu	September 2017
Commissioner of Budget and Economic Planning	Isaac Kamalu	September 2017
Commissioner of Chieftaincy and Community Affairs	Sylvanus Nwankwo	September 2017
Commissioner of Commerce and Industry	—	—
Commissioner of Culture And Tourism	Tonye Briggs-Oniyide	September 2017
Commissioner of Education	Tamunosisi Gogo Jaja	September 2017
Commissioner of Employment Generation and Empowerment	—	—
Commissioner of Energy and Natural resources	—	—
Commissioner of Environment	Roseline Konya	September 2017
Commissioner of Finance	Fred Kpakol	September 2017
Commissioner of Health	Princewill A. Chike	September 2017
Commissioner of Housing	Chinedu Tasie	September 2017
Commissioner of Information and Communications	Emmanuel Okah	September 2017
Commissioner of Justice	Emmanuel C. Aguma	July 2017
Commissioner of Land and Survey	—	—
Commissioner of Local Government Affairs	Rodaford Long-John	September 2017
Commissioner of Power	Shedrack Chukwu	September 2017
Commissioner of Social Welfare & Rehabilitation	Damiete H. Miller	September 2017
Commissioner of Special Duties	Emeka Onowu	September 2017
Commissioner of Sports	Boma Iyaye	September 2017
Commissioner of Transport	Walter Ibibia	September 2017
Commissioner of Urban Development	—	—
Commissioner of Water Resources and Rural Development	Kaniye Ebeku	September 2017
Commissioner of Women Affairs	Ukel Oyaghiri	September 2017
Commissioner of Works	Dum Dekor	September 2017
Commissioner of Youth Development	—	—
