= Government of Rivers State =

State government in Nigeria

- Official logo
- Formation: 1979 (47 years ago)
- Jurisdiction: Rivers State
- Website: riversstate.gov.ng

Legislative branch
- Legislature: House of Assembly
- Meeting place: Rivers State House of Assembly Complex

Executive branch
- Leader: Governor of Rivers State
- Appointer: Direct popular vote
- Headquarters: The Brick House, Rivers State Government House
- Main organ: Executive Council
- Departments: 26

Judicial branch
- Court: High Court
- Seat: Port Harcourt

The Government of Rivers State consists of elected representatives and appointed officials responsible for the government of Rivers State, Nigeria. Rivers State has a population of about 5 million people, and is one of the 36 states that make up the Federal Republic of Nigeria. The state government is composed of the executive, legislative, and judicial branches, whose powers are vested by the Constitution in the House of Assembly, the Governor and the High Court. The judiciary operates independently of the executive and the legislature. At the local level, elected officials are in charge of local government areas.

== Executive ==
The executive branch is headed by the Governor, assisted by the Deputy Governor, both elected. The governor appoints the heads of parastatals, state-owned bodies, judicial officers, permanent secretaries and members of the Executive Council with the exception of the deputy. The Civil Service is administered by the head of service, a career civil servant, with each ministry managed by a permanent secretary. The commissioner is responsible for policy, while the permanent secretary provides continuity and is responsible for operations.

=== Governor ===
As the highest ranking-official in the executive, the Governor of Rivers State wields significant influence in matters relating to the governance of the state. As in most presidential systems, the governor is both the head of government and head of state. The governor is empowered by the Constitution to preside over the Executive Council, as well as to appoint, dismiss or reappoint its members–excluding the deputy governor–at will. In addition the governor may sign legislation passed by the House into law or may veto it, however, the bill automatically becomes law after 30 days if the governor does not sign the legislation.

A vote by a two-thirds majority in the House can overrule the governor. The same vote is required to initiate an impeachment process of the governor or the deputy governor. When the chief executive is unable to discharge their duties, the deputy governor assumes the office of Acting Governor until the governor resumes duty, or until election of a new governor.

Since achieving statehood, Rivers State has had a total of 6 governors. Four of the former governors are still alive while only one has died. The longest serving governor is Peter Odili, a physician by profession. He spent 2,923 days in office.

=== Deputy Governor ===
The position of Deputy Governor of Rivers State constitutes the vice-head of state and government, created when the federation returned to civilian authority under the Second Republic. Whoever holds the post is considered the second highest official in the executive branch. The deputy governor is also seen as the first official in line to succeed the Governor of Rivers State, should that office be vacated.

The deputy governor is elected concurrently on a ticket with the governor for a term of four years renewable once. The annual salary for the office as of 2009 is ₦2,112,215. Physician Ipalibo Banigo is the first woman to hold the position since it was established. Banigo, formerly a civil servant in the Ministry of Health, was chosen by governor Ezenwo Nyesom Wike to be his running mate in the 2015 election.

=== Executive council ===
The executive council is currently made up of:

Office	Incumbent	Term began
Governor	H.E Sir. Siminalayi Fubara DSSRS	29 May 2023
Deputy Governor	H.E Prof. Ngozi Nma Odu DSSRS	29 May 2023
Attorney General	Justice Dagogo Israel Iboroma, SAN	May 2024
Secretary to the State Government	Tammy Danagogo	May 2019
Chief of Staff	Hon. Edison Ehie	January 2024
Head of Civil Service	Dr. George Nwaeke	-
Commissioner of Youth Development	Dr. Kenneth Chisom Gbali	—
Director-General of the Bureau of Public Procurement	Igonibo E. Thompson	February 2016
Media and Publicity Special Adviser	—	—
Administrator (GPHCDA)	Desmond Akawor	June 2015
Commissioner of Agriculture	Charles Nwogu	September 2017
Commissioner of Budget and Economic Planning	Isaac Kamalu	September 2017
Commissioner of Chieftaincy and Community Affairs	Sylvanus Nwankwo	September 2017
Commissioner of Commerce and Industry	—	—
Commissioner of Culture And Tourism	Tonye Briggs-Oniyide	September 2017
Commissioner of Education	Tamunosisi Gogo Jaja	September 2017
Commissioner of Employment Generation and Empowerment	—	—
Commissioner of Energy and Natural resources	—	—
Commissioner of Environment	Roseline Konya	September 2017
Commissioner of Finance	Fred Kpakol	September 2017
Commissioner of Health	Princewill A. Chike	September 2017
Commissioner of Housing	Chinedu Tasie Nwabueze	September 2017
Commissioner of Information and Communications	Emmanuel Okah	September 2017
Commissioner of Justice	Emmanuel C. Aguma	July 2017
Commissioner of Land and Survey	—	—
Commissioner of Local Government Affairs	Rodaford Longjohn	September 2017
Commissioner of Power	Shedrack Chukwu	September 2017
Commissioner of Social Welfare & Rehabilitation	Damiete H. Miller	September 2017
Commissioner of Special Duties	Emeka Onowu	September 2017
Commissioner of Sports	Boma Iyaye	September 2017
Commissioner of Transport	Walter Ibibia	September 2017
Commissioner of Urban Development	—	—
Commissioner of Water Resources and Rural Development	Kaniye Ebeku	September 2017
Commissioner of Women Affairs	Ukel Oyaghiri	September 2017
Commissioner of Works	Dum Dekor	September 2017

=== Ministries ===
Ministry	Notes	Website
Agriculture	Regulates and formulates agricultural sector-related policies	http://rsmoa.gov.ng
Budget and Economic Planning	Concerned with economic priorities and programmes of the government	
Chieftaincy and Community Affairs	Handles chieftaincy and community-related affairs	
Commerce and Industry	Deals with commerce, industry and cooperative matters	
Culture and Tourism	Develops and implements policies on culture and tourism	
Education	Directs education in Rivers State	http://ministryofeducationriversstate.com.ng
Employment Generation and Empowerment	Employment provision and empowerment	https://web.archive.org/web/20141218211651/http://riversjobs.gov.ng/
Energy and Natural Resources	Monitors, controls and regulates energy and natural resources-related activities	
Environment	Oversees the environment in Rivers State	
Finance	Manages, controls and monitors state revenues and expenditures	
Health	Facilitates the provision of health services	http://riversstatemoh.gov.ng
Housing		
Information and Communications	Regulates broadcasting and print media	
Justice	Administers justice. Headed by the Commissioner of Justice	
Lands and Survey		
Local Government Affairs	Charged with local government and local administration	
Power	Charged with electrical energy and power	
Social Welfare and Rehabilitation	Implements programmes and provides social, rehabilitative services	
Special Duties	Manages disasters and emergencies	
Sports		
Transport	Responsible for transport infrastructure	
Urban Development	Reviews and prepares physical development, urban renewal and transportation plans	
Water Resources and Rural Development	Reviews and prepares physical development, urban renewal and transportation plans	https://web.archive.org/web/20150123112157/http://www.rvswaterministry.net/
Women Affairs	Encourages the development of women	
Works	Responsible for socio-economic infrastructure	
Youth Development	Promotes youth empowerment and development	

=== Agencies and Parastatals ===
Agencies and parastatals, typically reporting to a ministry, include:

- Road Maintenance and Rehabilitation Agency
- Road Traffic Management Authority
- Rivers State University of Science and Technology
- Rivers State Television Authority
- Rivers State Sustainable Development Agency
- Rivers State Polytechnic
- Rivers State Newspaper Corporation
- Rivers State Microfinance Agency
- Housing and Property Development Authority
- Rivers State College of Health Science and Technology
- Rivers State College of Arts and Science
- Rivers State University of Education
- Rivers State Broadcasting Corporation
- Rivers State Agricultural Development Programme
- Universal Basic Education Board
- Senior Secondary Schools Board
- Christian Pilgrims Welfare Board
- Muslim Pilgrims Welfare Board
- Local Government Service Commission
- Rivers State Waste Management Authority

== Legislature ==
The Rivers State House of Assembly is the unicameral legislative body of the state government. It was established in 1979 by part II, section 84 of the Constitution of Nigeria, which states "There shall be a House of Assembly for each of the States of the Federation". Led by a Speaker, the House of Assembly consists of 32 members, each elected to four-year terms in single-member constituencies by plurality. Its primary responsibility is to create laws for the peace, order and effective government of the state.

=== Powers ===
There are numerous powers the Constitution expressly and specifically granted to the House of Assembly as they are necessary for its relevance. These include the powers to approve budget estimates presented to it by the executive; to make laws establishing the chargeable rates and the procedure to be used in assessing and collecting the rates charged by each local government council; confirm gubernatorial appointments, oversee and monitor activities of government agencies, review policy implementation strategies of the executive, summon before it and question a commissioner about the conduct of his or her ministry especially when the affairs of that ministry are under consideration and to initiate impeachment proceeding in order to secure the removal of the governor or the deputy.

=== Current Representatives ===
The legislature consists of elected representatives from each constituency. As of June 12, 2015 they were:

Constituency	Representative
Abua–Odual	Marshal Stanley-Uwom
Ahoada East I	Martyns Mannah
Ahoada East II	Ehie Edison
Ahoada West	Okpokiri Nwanaka
Akuku-Toru I	Major Jack
Akuku-Toru II	Tonye Alalibo
Andoni	Ikuinyi Owaji Ibani
Asari-Toru I	Enemi George
Asari-Toru II	Granville Wellington
Bonny	Abinye Pepple
Degema	Dagogo Farah
Eleme	Josiah Olu
Emohua	Ogeh Samuel
Etche I	Opurum Nwuzoma
Etche II	Tony Ejiogu
Gokana	Israel Ngbuelo Lebura
Ikwerre	Azubuike Wanjoku
Khana I	Deeyah Bariene
Khana II	Dinebari Loolo
Obio-Akpor I	Martins Amaewhule
Obio-Akpor II	Michael Okechukwu Chinda
Ogba–Egbema–Ndoni I	Christian Ahiakwo
Ogba–Egbema–Ndoni II	Uwaji Nathaniel
Ogu–Bolo	Evans Bapakaye Bipi
Okrika	Adams Dabotorudima
Omuma	Kelechi Godspower Nwogu
Opobo–Nkoro	Diri Kelly Adonye
Oyigbo	Chisom Promise Dike
Port Harcourt I	Ogbonda Jones Nwene
Port Harcourt II	Adoki Tonye Smart
Port Harcourt III	Victor Ihunwo Nyeche
Tai	Ngbar Sylvester Amuele
Clerk of the House	Mr. Alex E. Nwala

== Judiciary ==
The administration of justice in Rivers State is one of the fundamental duties of the judiciary of the state. This branch of government explains and applies the laws by hearing and eventually making decisions on various legal cases. It has a regulatory or supervisory body known as the Judicial Service Commission, which takes care of appointment, promotion and disciplinary issues of the judiciary.

The Chief Judge of Rivers State is the appointed head of the judicial branch. The chief judge is also the most senior judge and presiding member of the High Court of Justice. Among other responsibilities, the chief judge has the ceremonial duty of administering the oath of office of the Governor of Rivers State. In modern tradition, the chief judge retires voluntarily at sixty years of age, or statutorily at sixty five.

Most appointments to the judiciary are made by the governor, but acting upon the recommendation of the National Judicial Council. At present, there are about 10 judicial divisions within the High Court of Justice, and about 26 judges carrying out their professional work.

== Local government ==
Local government areas handle local administration, under an elected chairman.

Rivers State is divided into twenty-three local government areas (LGAs):

LGA Name	Area (km^{2})	Census 2006 population	Administrative capital	Postal Code
Port Harcourt	109	541,115	Port Harcourt	500
Obio-Akpor	260	464,789	Rumuodomanya	500
Okrika	222	222,026	Okrika	500
Ogu–Bolo	89	74,683	Ogu	500
Eleme	138	190,884	Ogale, Nchia	501
Tai	159	117,797	Sakpenwa	501
Gokana	126	228,828	Kpor	501
Khana	560	294,217	Bori	502
Oyigbo	248	122,687	Afam	502
Opobo–Nkoro	130	151,511	Opobo Town	503
Andoni	233	211,009	Ngo	503
Bonny	642	215,358	Bonny	503
Degema	1,011	249,773	Degema	504
Asari-Toru	113	220,100	Buguma	504
Akuku-Toru	1,443	156,006	Abonnema	504
Abua–Odual	704	282,988	Abua	510
Ahoada West	403	249,425	Akinima	510
Ahoada East	341	166,747	Ahoada	510
Ogba–Egbema–Ndoni	969	284,010	Omoku	510
Emohua	831	201,901	Emohua	511
Ikwerre	655	189,726	Isiokpo	511
Etche	805	249,454	Okehi	512
Omuma	170	100,366	Eberi	512

== See also ==
- Judiciary of Rivers State
- Elections in Rivers State
- Nigerian National Assembly delegation from Rivers
