= Executive Council of Rivers State =

Executive arm of a state government in Nigeria

The Executive Council, also known as the Governor's Cabinet, is the highest administrative decision-making authority in Rivers State. It is part of the executive branch which is the most influential branch of the state government. It comprises the governor, deputy governor, Secretary to the State Government, chief of staff, commissioners and special advisers. All of its members excluding the Deputy Governor are appointed by the Governor of Rivers State and confirmed by the House of the Assembly of the state.

The Executive Council is responsible for advising and assisting the Chief Executive in the performance of his or her official duties. Individuals who have been appointed to serve in the Council may also be dismissed or reappointed (to other posts) at will.

== Current Cabinet ==
The current Cabinet is serving under Governor of Rivers State, His Excellency, Sir Siminalayi Fubara DSSRS, who took office as governor on 29 May 2023.

| Office | Incumbent | Term began |
|---|---|---|
| Governor | H.E Sir. Siminalayi Fubara DSSRS | 29 May 2023 |
| Deputy Governor | H.E Prof. Ngozi Nma Odu DSSRS | 29 May 2023 |
| Attorney General | Justice Dagogo Israel Iboroma, SAN | May 2024 |
| Secretary to the State Government | Tammy Danagogo | May 2019 |
| Chief of Staff | Hon. Edison Ehie | January 2024 |
| Head of Civil Service | Dr. George Nwaeke | - |
| Commissioner of Youth Development | Dr. Kenneth Chisom Gbali | — |
| Director-General of the Bureau of Public Procurement | Igonibo E. Thompson | February 2016 |
| Media and Publicity Special Adviser | — | — |
| Administrator (GPHCDA) | Desmond Akawor | June 2015 |
| Commissioner of Agriculture | Charles Nwogu | September 2017 |
| Commissioner of Budget and Economic Planning | Isaac Kamalu | September 2017 |
| Commissioner of Chieftaincy and Community Affairs | Sylvanus Nwankwo | September 2017 |
| Commissioner of Commerce and Industry | — | — |
| Commissioner of Culture And Tourism | Tonye Briggs-Oniyide | September 2017 |
| Commissioner of Education | Tamunosisi Gogo Jaja | September 2017 |
| Commissioner of Employment Generation and Empowerment | — | — |
| Commissioner of Energy and Natural resources | — | — |
| Commissioner of Environment | Roseline Konya | September 2017 |
| Commissioner of Finance | Fred Kpakol | September 2017 |
| Commissioner of Health | Princewill A. Chike | September 2017 |
| Commissioner of Housing | Chinedu Tasie Nwabueze | September 2017 |
| Commissioner of Information and Communications | Emmanuel Okah | September 2017 |
| Commissioner of Justice | Emmanuel C. Aguma | July 2017 |
| Commissioner of Land and Survey | — | — |
| Commissioner of Local Government Affairs | Rodaford Longjohn | September 2017 |
| Commissioner of Power | Shedrack Chukwu | September 2017 |
| Commissioner of Social Welfare & Rehabilitation | Damiete H. Miller | September 2017 |
| Commissioner of Special Duties | Emeka Onowu | September 2017 |
| Commissioner of Sports | Boma Iyaye | September 2017 |
| Commissioner of Transport | Walter Ibibia | September 2017 |
| Commissioner of Urban Development | — | — |
| Commissioner of Water Resources and Rural Development | Kaniye Ebeku | September 2017 |
| Commissioner of Women Affairs | Ukel Oyaghiri | September 2017 |
| Commissioner of Works | Dum Dekor | September 2017 |

== See also ==
- Governor of Rivers State
