= Greater Port Harcourt City Development Authority =

- Official logo of GPHCDA
- Abbreviation: GPHCDA
- Formation: 2009
- Type: Government agency
- Headquarters: 38 Ordinance Road, Trans Amadi
- Location: Port Harcourt, Rivers State
- Region served: Greater Port Harcourt
- Members: 15
- Chairman: Ferdinand Alabraba
- Administrator: Bennett Chu
- Website: www.gphcity.com

Greater Port Harcourt City Development Authority (GPHCDA) is an agency of the Government of Rivers State, the second largest economy in Nigeria. It was formed under Law No. 2 of 2009 on Greater Port Harcourt City Development Authority. It is entrusted with facilitating the execution of the master plan for Greater Port Harcourt. It also has the responsibility to develop the area by putting into practical effect policy measures aimed at promoting and providing effective infrastructures and social services.

== Composition ==
The Authority Membership is composed of a part-time chairman, an administrator, six qualified professionals in the field of estate management, surveying, engineering, urban planning, architecture, quantity surveying, building and law. It also includes representatives of the ministries of Justice, Land Survey, Urban Development, Works, Environment and two persons representing NGOs and other stakeholders.

== Current board members ==
The current board members, as of June 2016 are:

- Ferdinand Alabraba, Chairman
- Desmond Akawor, Administrator
- John Synger, Secretary
- Florence Amiesimaka, Member
- Chima Boms, Member
- Emma Okas Wike, Member
- Gloria Akor, Member
- Tonte J. Davies, Member
- Nnamdi Obuzor, Member
- Emmanuel C. Aguma, Member
- Emmanuel Okah, Member
- Harrison B. Iheanyichukwu, Member
- Chinyere Igwe, Member
- Roseline Konya, Member
- Lands and Survey commissioner, Member

== See also ==
- Rivers State Ministry of Urban Development
- List of government agencies of Rivers State
