= Port Harcourt Pleasure Park =

Park in Nigeria

- Interactive map of Port Harcourt Pleasure Park
- Type: Public park
- Location: Between Rumuomasi and Rumuola, Port Harcourt, Rivers State, Nigeria
- Nearest city: Aba City
- Coordinates: 4°49′56″N 7°00′24″E
- Opened: 26 May 2017
- Owner: Government of Rivers State
- Status: Open

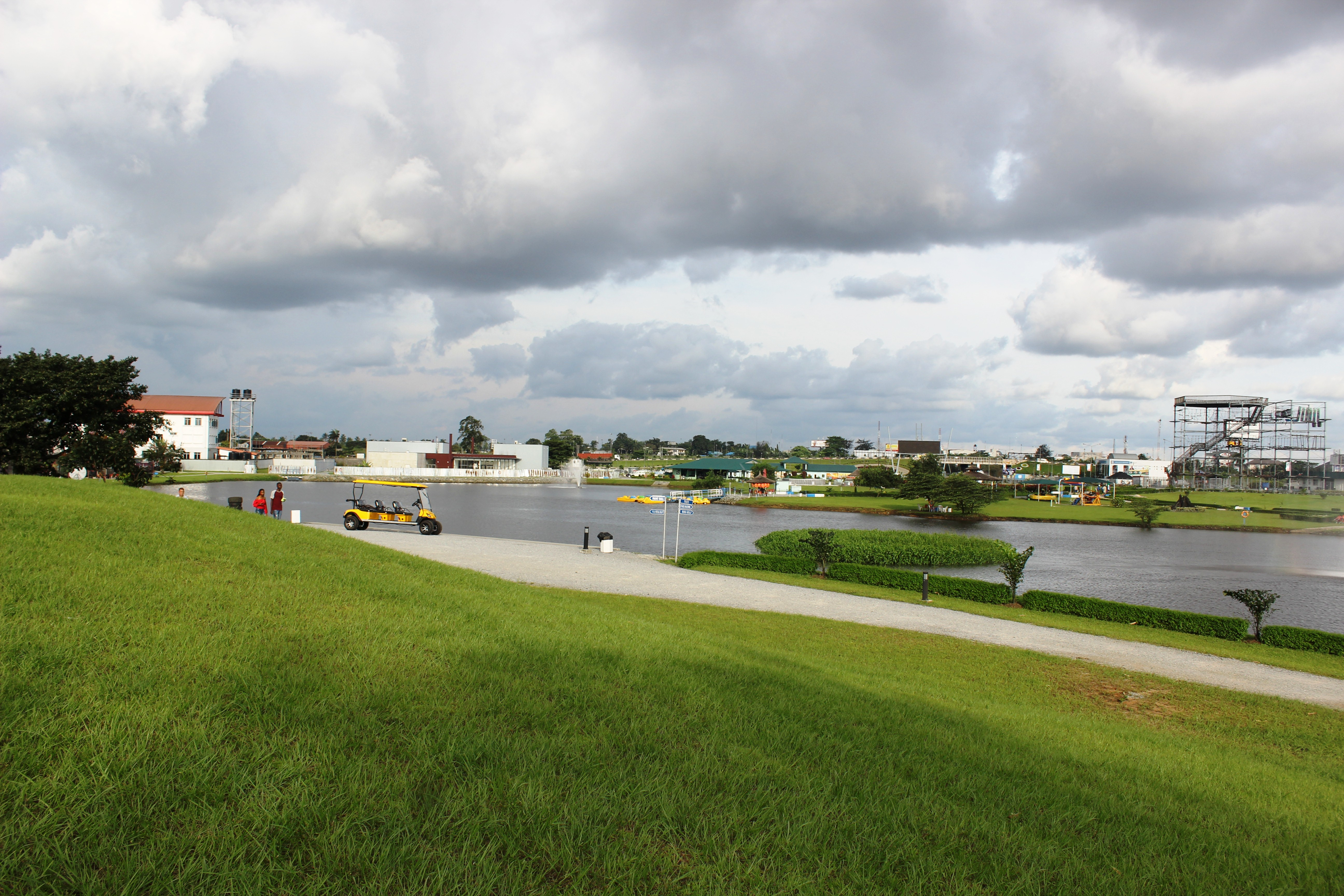
Port Harcourt Pleasure Park - A sectional view

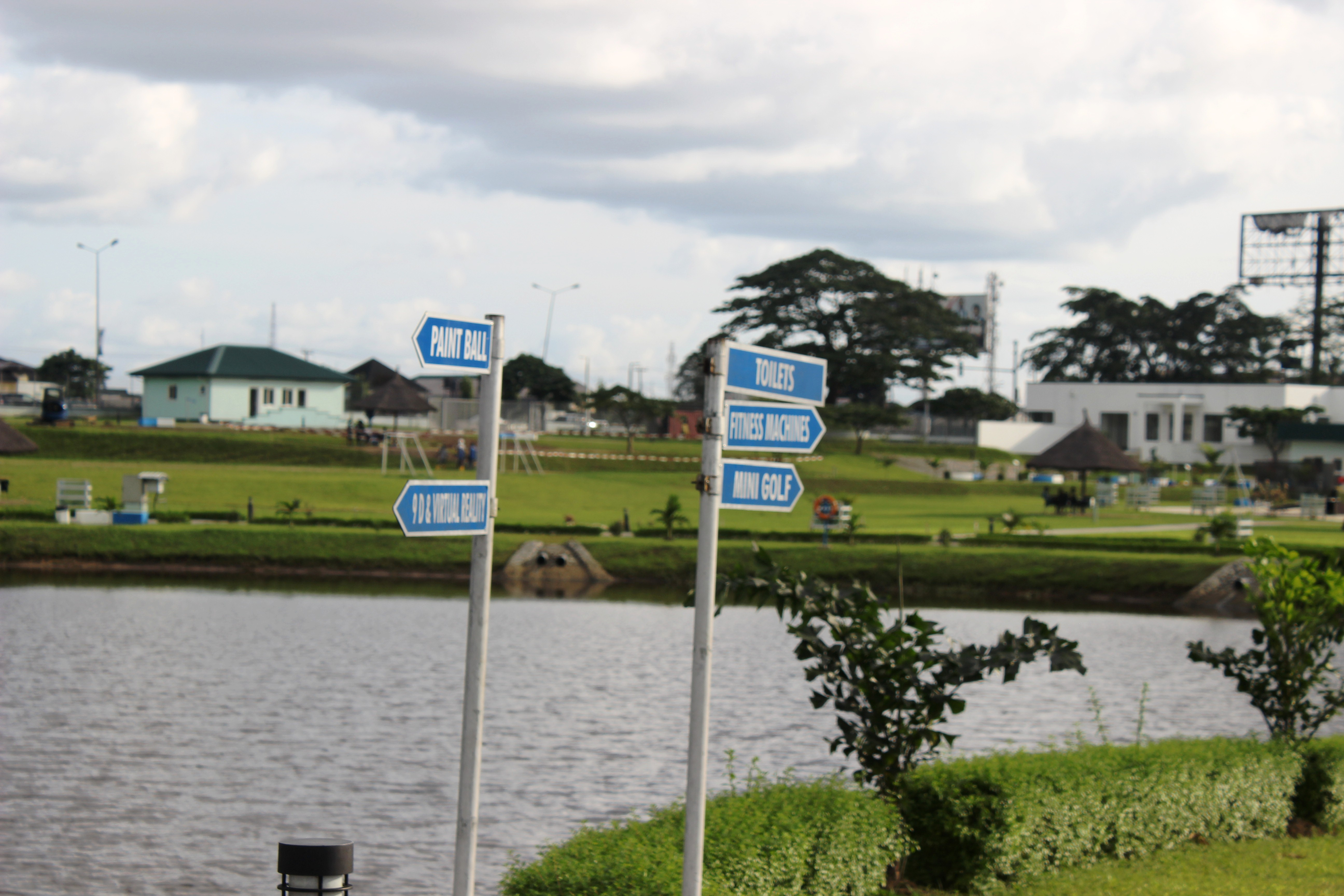
Port Harcourt Pleasure Park - A sectional view

Port Harcourt Pleasure Park is a public recreation park in Niger-Delta's oil rich garden city of Port Harcourt, Rivers State, Nigeria. It is strategically located along the major Aba Road, and flanked between the Army Barracks (a.k.a. Bori Camp) and Air Force base junction, on an expansive open land with 24-7-365 internal security.

The park is serving as a revenue generator for the state, operated by an international staff of Julius Berger Nigeria Plc. The park boasts a wide range of facilities for all ages including a 5-star Cinema and an International restaurant launched to complement the facilities at the park.

== Location ==
The Park is strategically located along the major Aba Road and flanked between the Army Barracks (Bori Camp) and Air Force base junction on an expansive open land with 24-7-365 internal security.

== Overview ==
Julius Berger of Nigeria was awarded the contract to construct the park and started work in May 2016. The whole project was completed within 12 months of the commencement date.

On Friday, 26 May 2017, the Government of Rivers State commissioned and opened the Port Harcourt Pleasure Park for public use in a grand ceremony that attracted thousands of Riverians from all walks of life. Former governor, Peter Odili inaugurated the project, which was initiated, designed and constructed by the Nyesom Wike administration.

The one-year Park project was completed in May 2017 by the Nyesom Wike led Rivers State Government as part of projects to mark the 50 years of the creation of the state as well as keeping to his promise to the people to develop tourism and ensure it becomes a world centre of attraction.

After two years of its operation, precisely on 1 May 2019, the management of Julius Berger Nigeria Plc decided to take over complete operation of the Park by manning it with competent local and international staff tasked with the responsibility of ensuring that the park meets up with the original mission of serving as both a tourist destination and a revenue generator for the state.

== Entertainment ==
The Governor of Rivers State Barrister Ezenwo Nyesom Wike who had earlier announced that a modern Cinema would be constructed to complement the facilities at the park, kept to his promise as he unveiled the newly constructed Pleasure Park 5-star Cinema on 11 September 2019 as part of celebrations to mark his 100-days in office. This Cinema known as Kada Cinemas is run by Kada Cinemas group.

In November 2019, the Park was nominated from top 10 to top 5 in the annual Nigeria Tourism Awards in two separate categories namely:
• BEST TOURIST ATTRACTION in Nigeria
• BEST FAMILY AMUSEMENT CENTRE in Nigeria

Other contenders in these prestigious awards included the following:

1. ADO AWAYE HANGING LAKE
2. IDANRE HILL
3. LEKKI CONSERVATION CENTRE
4. OLUMO ROCK
5. YANKARI GAME RESERVE
6. HI-IMPACT PLANET
7. OMU RESORT
8. RUFUS AND BEES
9. UPBEAT CENTRE

Port Harcourt Pleasure Park is home to the entertainment industry as Nollywood actors and music artistes (local and international) use the park to shoot movies and music videos, as well as premiere same at the Cinema. A movie that was shot in Port Harcourt Pleasure Park and premiered in Kada Cinemas is UnRoyal starring Pete Edochie, Ik Ogbonna, Blossom Chukwujekwu, Ime Bishop Umoh (a.k.a. Okon Lagos), Linda Osifo and others.

The education area also makes the park a destination for after-school fun, learning and relaxation as many tertiary institutions, secondary and primary schools, and military schools bring their scholars for recreation and fitness activities.

== Facilities ==
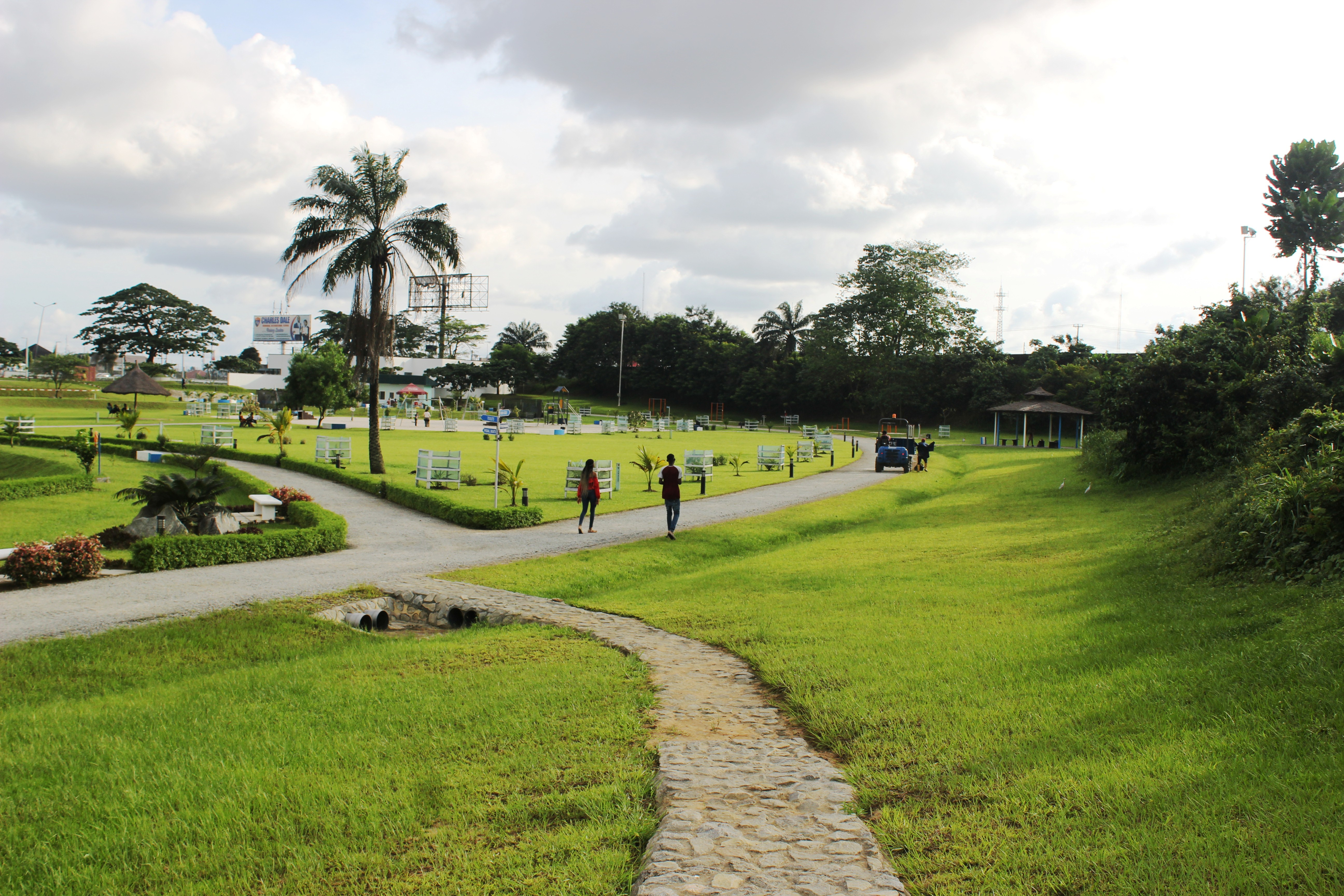
Port Harcourt Pleasure Park - Taking a walk

The park boasts a wide range of facilities including an extensive children's playground, a miniature soccer field, 5 person paddle boats, each designed for drivers and 3 passengers and water steps.

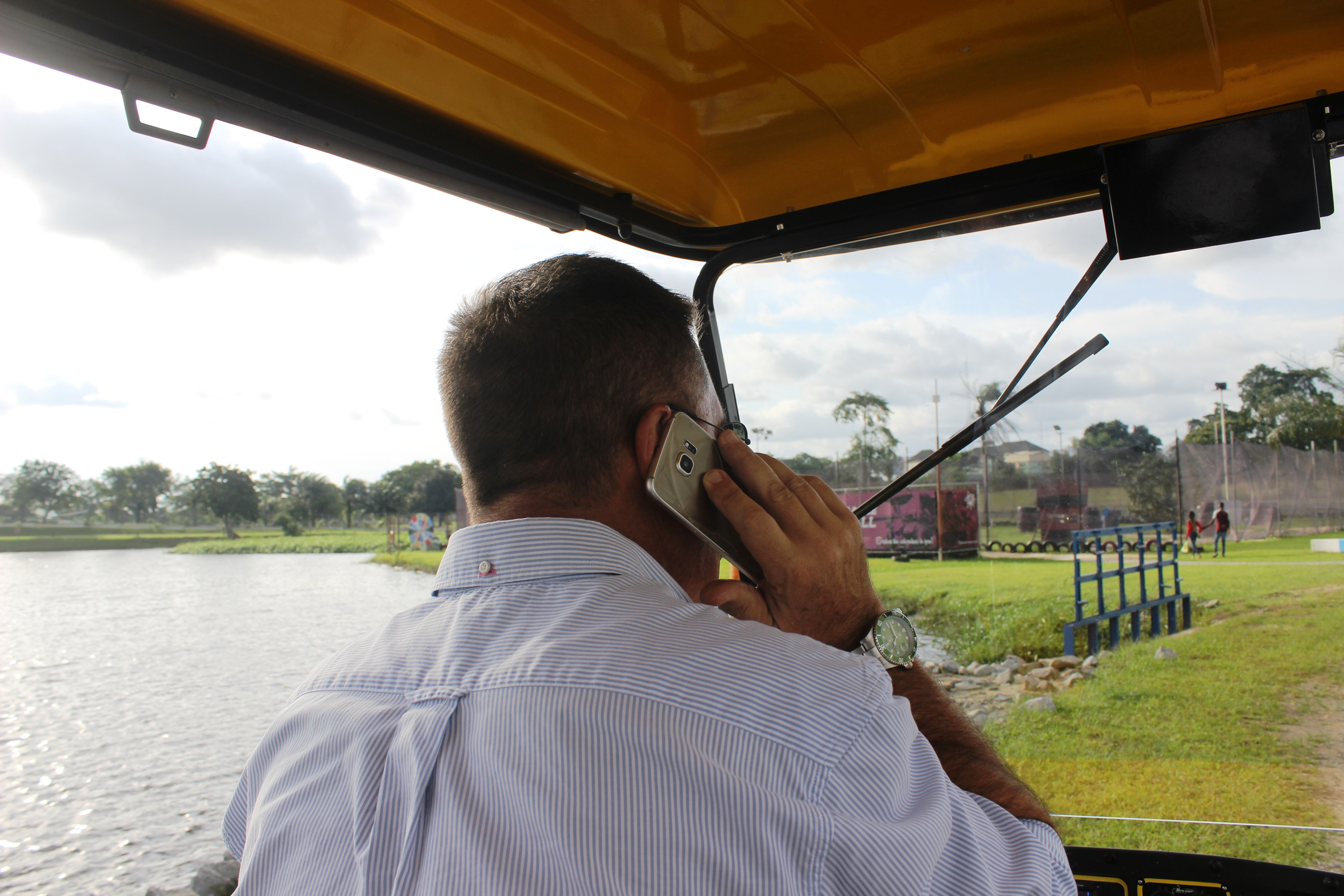
Port Harcourt Pleasure Park - A cart tour

The golf course consists of a series of holes characterized by their short length.

The park is also filled with various exercise machines ranging from simple walkers and massage machines to elliptical trainers. There is a parking lot, a jogging track, restaurants and a climbing tower. The list of current facilities are:

- 5-star Movie Cinema (two viewing halls totaling 230 seating capacity and 1-VIP lounge with 23-seater VIP viewing hall)
- 2 Restaurants (Lebanese/Italian)
- Climbing Tower
- Pedal Boats
- Mini Golf Course
- Playgrounds
- Fitness Equipment
- 5-D Cinema
- 9-D Cinema
- PS4 Games
- Water Steps
- Jogging Circuit
- Mini Soccer Field
- Gyroscope
- Bull Rodeo
- Carousel
- Paint Ball
- Shooting range
- Table Tennis
- Bouncy Castle
- King of Castle
- Trampoline
- Kids Boat ride
- Train ride
- Cart ride (Family off-road trip)
- Occulus game
- Virtual Reality games
- Virtual Reality Fitness room
- Other Facilities

The Governor of Rivers State Ezenwo Nyesom Wike who had earlier announced that a modern cinema would be constructed to complement the facilities at the park, kept to his promise as he unveiled the newly constructed Pleasure Park Cinema on 11 September 2019 as part of celebrations to mark his 100-days in office.
