= Ephraim Nwuzi =

Nigerian politician

Member of the House of Representatives of Nigeria
- In office 2019–2023
- Succeeded by: Kelechi Nwogu
- Constituency: Etche/Omuma

Rivers State Commissioner for Employment Generation and Empowerment
- In office 2015–2017
- Governor: Nyesom Wike

Chairman of Etche Local Government Area
- In office 2004–2011

Personal details
- Profession: Politician

Ephraim Nwuzi is a Rivers State politician who once served as the Commissioner of Employment Generation and Empowerment. During the 2019 general election, he contested under the platform of The Peoples' Democratic Party and won a seat at The Federal House of Representatives He is a member of the Rivers State People's Democratic Party. He is a former chairman of Etche Local Government Council.

In 2011, he was conferred the title of Ekwueme 1 of Etche by the Etche Supreme Council of Traditional Rulers.

== Early and political career ==
Ephraim Nwuzi began his public service career in Etche Local Government Area of Rivers State. Before holding elected political office, he served as a personal assistant to a local government chairman.

He later became involved in local government administration and community leadership in Etche, where he served as Chairman of Etche Local Government Council.

Nwuzi was elected to represent Etche/Omuma Federal Constituency in the Nigerian House of Representatives in the 2019 general election on the platform of the Peoples Democratic Party (PDP). The result was recorded by the Independent National Electoral Commission (INEC), which declared him the winner of the constituency election.

In October 2020, Nwuzi defected from the PDP to the All Progressives Congress (APC) while serving in the House of Representatives. His defection was announced on the floor of the House of Representatives.

He contested for re-election to the House of Representatives in 2023 as the APC candidate for Etche/Omuma Federal Constituency.

== Legislative activities ==
During his tenure in the Nigerian House of Representatives, Ephraim Nwuzi represented Etche/Omuma Federal Constituency.

He served on several House committees, including the Committee on Diaspora Affairs and the Ad-hoc Committee on Host Communities.

== Community activities ==
Ephraim Nwuzi has been associated with community and political activities in Etche Local Government Area of Rivers State. Reports from local media have highlighted commendations from Etche stakeholders regarding his contributions to development efforts in the area.

In 2011, he was conferred with the traditional title of Ekwueme I of Etche by the Etche Supreme Council of Traditional Rulers.
