= Rivers State Senior Secondary Schools Board =

RSSSSB
- Rivers State Senior Secondary Schools Board
- Formation: May 30, 2012; 13 years ago
- Type: Government agency
- Headquarters: Plot #4, 6 Emekuku St, D-line, Port Harcourt 500101, Rivers
- Location: Rivers State
- Board Chairman: Anthony Egwurugwu (DSSSR)

The Rivers State Senior Secondary Schools Board is an agency of the government of Rivers State responsible for the development and management of the state's secondary education system. It is headquartered in Port Harcourt. Its formation was authorized by the Senior Secondary Schools Board Law No.5 of 2012.

== History ==
1. Post Primary Schools Board Law No. 4 of 1989

The journey of the Rivers State Senior Secondary Schools Board began with the establishment of the Rivers State Post Primary Schools Board (PPSB) in 1989, under the Post Primary Schools Board Law No. 4. This legislative act was designed to provide a structured framework for managing public secondary schools across Rivers State. The PPSB was tasked with ensuring the quality of education by supervising schools, managing educational resources, and overseeing the recruitment, appointment, and management of teaching and non-teaching staff. The focus was broad, encompassing all aspects of secondary education within the state.

2. Senior Secondary Schools Board Law No. 5 of 2012

Recognizing the need for a more specialized approach to education, the Rivers State Government enacted the Senior Secondary Schools Board Law No. 5 in 2012, which repealed the Post Primary Schools Board Law of 1989. This new law marked a significant shift in the educational strategy of Rivers State. It established the RSSSSB, focusing exclusively on senior secondary education. By narrowing its scope, the government aimed to address the unique challenges faced by senior secondary schools, ensuring that educational standards were met and maintained.

== Composition ==
According to the Law, the governing board consists of:

1. Chairman
2. Four regular members
3. Permanent Secretary of the Ministry of Education
4. Five non-regular members

== Duties and powers ==
The duties and powers of the board, as specified by the Law, are the following:

Recruit, appoint, post, promote, discipline and transfer both the academic and non academic staff of the Secondary Schools but in the case of principals and vice – principals, their promotion, transfer and discipline shall be made with the approval of the Commissioner; to handle inter-service and inter – state transfer of academic and non – academic staff other than those handled by the Civil Service Commission, subject to the approval of the Governor; to manage senior secondary schools and be responsible for:- supply of school equipment and materials for approved functions and programmes of the schools, provision of petty cash grants, provision and maintenance of school libraries, financing sporting activities, provision of transportation facilities to schools. Other functions of the board are: to establish and maintain an office in the headquarters of each local government area in the state for easy administration of schools in the local government area; keep proper and up-to-date teachers’ service records; recommend and approve applications of staff for in – service training to ministry; approve the budget of the board and to submit same to the ministry for consideration by government; etc.

== See also ==
- List of government agencies of Rivers State
