= 2016 Rivers State budget =

2016 Budget of the Rivers State government
- Submitted: 18 December 2015
- Submitted by: Ezenwo Nyesom Wike
- Submitted to: 8th Rivers State House of Assembly
- Country: Rivers State
- Party: Rivers State People's Democratic Party
- Total revenue: ₦307 billion (estimated)
- Total expenditures: ₦307 billion (requested)

The 2016 Rivers State budget was the financial statement of the Rivers State government presenting its proposed revenues and spending for the 2016 fiscal year. It was presented before the House of Assembly on 18 December 2015 by Governor Ezenwo Nyesom Wike. This was Governor Wike's first budget submitted as governor.

== Expenses ==
The budget estimate proposed was ₦307 billion while ₦120 billion was proposed for recurrent expenditure. Out of this, ₦55 billion was for salaries, ₦18,114,178,637 for payment of pensions and gratuities with overhead costs at ₦14,524,179,815.

In addition, projected capital expenditure was ₦187 billion, which gave a capital to recurrent expenditure ratio of 60:40. In terms of allocation, the figure showed that 15.5% was allocated to administration, 29.1% to the economic sector, 0.41% to law and justice, and 28.4% to the social sector.

== Funding sources ==
All major revenue sources of the ₦307 billion budget for fiscal year 2016 were broken down as follows:

- Statutory allocation, including derivation and VAT: ₦115 billion (est.)
- Internally generated revenue: ₦120 billion (est.)
- Other: ₦72 billion (est.)

== Criticism ==
There was criticism from across the political spectrum about the budget, mainly from members of the opposition party. Most of this criticism was directed towards the quick passage of the budget with the All Progressives Congress calling it the "height of banditry". The party believed that the budget shouldn't have been passed since some of the House members were then contesting the nullification of their elections at the appeal courts. It also claimed that such action was an indication that the legislative and executive branches of government in Rivers State were conniving with a hidden agenda to benefit themselves.
