= Godwins =

Godwins may refer to

- House of Godwin, a leading family in 11th century Anglo-Saxon England
- Rufus Godwins, Nigerian civil servant.
