= Rivers State Microfinance Agency =

Government agency overview
- Formed: 2008
- Jurisdiction: Government of Rivers State
- Headquarters: 3 Evo Crescent, New GRA, Port Harcourt
- Parent department: Ministry of Finance
- Website: www.rima.com.ng

The Rivers State Microfinance Agency, locally referred by its abbreviation RIMA, is a government body providing a range of services including financial, business and social support to institutions such as microfinance banks and entrepreneurs who lack access to adequate income in Rivers State. The agency was formed with the enactment of the Microfinance Agency Law No. 6 of 2008 by the Rivers State House of Assembly. The agency's primary purpose is to create employment and reduce poverty. Among its objectives are "developing human capacity and instituting a sustainable framework of reaching out to the active poor."

RIMA has delivered 388 million in micro-loans to about 884 beneficiaries across the state's 23 local government areas through its partnership with microfinance banks. In 2010, RIMA underwent a restructuring process which was aimed at improving its overall performance.

As of April 2016, the current Chairman of the agency is Rt. Hon. Austin Opara. The immediate past Managing Director & Chief Executive Officer was Ipalibo W. Sogules. He was recently sacked by Governor Nyesom Wike on fraud related charges.

== Chairpersons ==
- Evans E. Woherem

== See also ==
- List of government agencies of Rivers State
- Rivers State Ministry of Finance
