= Inauguration of Nyesom Wike =

Inauguration of Ezenwo Nyesom Wike
- Date: 29 May 2015 (11 years ago)
- Location: Liberation Stadium, Elekahia, Port Harcourt
- Participants: Ezenwo Nyesom Wike; Ipalibo Banigo

The Inauguration of Ezenwo Nyesom Wike as the 6th Governor of Rivers State took place on Friday, 29 May 2015 at the Liberation Stadium in Elekahia, Port Harcourt. The ceremony marked the beginning of the first four-year term of Ezenwo Nyesom Wike as Governor and Ipalibo Banigo as Deputy Governor.

Wike won in the 2015 gubernatorial election, receiving 87.77 percent of the popular vote. He was sworn-in in accordance with section 185 (2) of the amended Constitution of Nigeria. Prior to that, the Supreme Court had set aside the judgement of the Appeal Court which nullified the election.

== Wike Inaugural Committee ==
The inauguration committee was set up in April 2015 along with the transition committee. Former Deputy Speaker of the House of Reps, Austin Opara, was assigned as chairman with Jacob Beredugo as secretary.

== Pre-inaugural events ==
The full schedule of the events was unveiled by the committee on 20 May 2015 during a press briefing. On 24 May, a pre-inaugural church service was held at St Paul’s Anglican Cathedral, Garrison. On 26 May, pro-chancellor of the University of Uyo, Kimse Okoko presented a lecture at Aztech Arcum entitled Democracy and Good Governance Towards A New Rivers State. The next day, which was Children's Day, a novelty football match was staged at Sharks Stadium.

== Inaugural events ==
=== Swearing-in ceremony ===
On 29 May 2015, the official swearing-in of Governor-elect Wike took place at Liberation Stadium, Elekahia. Arriving at the venue, Wike went round the stadium in a motorcade to greet the crowd and also gave his acceptance speech. Due to the vacuum that existed in the office of the Chief Judge and the President of the Customary Court of Appeal in Rivers State around that period of time, Wike was sworn-in in accordance with the provisions of Section 185 (2) of the 1999 Constitution.

Chief Judge of Bayelsa State, Justice Kate Abiri, administered the Oath of Office. Wike had also solicited the cooperation and support of Riverian stakeholders in restoring the state to its former glory. His predecessor Chibuike Amaechi did not attend the ceremony as many had expected, but instead, was in Abuja for the presidential inauguration at Eagle Square.

=== Inauguration speech (excerpt) ===
My beloved people of Rivers State

It is with great humility and gratitude to God Almighty, who makes all things well that I address you today. I feel so humbled, blessed and grateful to God, whose holy hands in my life and the trust you have in me, provided the opportunity for me to serve as your Governor for the next four years.

Let me on behalf of the Deputy Governor, Her Excellency, Dr. Mrs. Ipalibo Banigo express our deep appreciation to you all for bestowing this great honour and responsibility on us.

Rivers State has been rescued and reclaimed. It is a new day in our history, a new dawn to repair and restore our dear state to the path of sanity. I invite you all to the table of brotherhood for the new beginning. I reiterate my declaration that in the election there were no losers and winners. Rather, Rivers State was the winner and so we are all winners.

— Ezenwo Nyesom Wike

== Post-inaugural events ==
The Governor, First Lady Eberechi Wike and Deputy Governor Ipalibo Banigo later proceeded to Salvation Ministries for a thanksgiving service. They were led in a thanksgiving prayer and praise session by pastor David Ibiyeomie. Some dignitaries who attended the service were Patience Jonathan, Ike Ekweremadu, Uche Secondus and Olisa Metuh, among others. On 1 June 2015, the 8th Rivers State House of Assembly was inaugurated.
