= Mike Anwuri =

Nigerian politician

Michael Eleonu Anwuri

Commissioner for Power, Rivers State
- In office December 2015 – 2017
- Governor: Nyesom Wike

Personal details
- Born: October 24, 1954 Mgbuela Rundele, Emohua Local Government Area, Rivers State, Nigeria
- Died: June 3, 2020 (aged 65)
- Education: Mathematics and Computer Science; Master of Business Administration
- Occupation: Banker, financial consultant, politician

Michael Eleonu Anwuri was a Nigerian banker, financial consultant, and politician. He served as Commissioner for Power in the Rivers State Executive Council from 2015 to 2017 under Governor Nyesom Wike. Before entering public service, he held senior management positions in Nigeria's banking sector before working as a financial consultant. He died on 3 June 2020.

== Early life and education ==
Michael Eleonu Anwuri was born on 24 October 1954 in Mgbuela Rundele, Emohua Local Government Area, Rivers State, to Pa Marcus Eleonu Anwuri and Madam Grace Okwulogwo Eleonu Anwuri. He attended State Primary School, Ndele, before proceeding to County Grammar School, Ikwerre/Etche, where he completed his secondary education in 1972. He later studied Mathematics/Computer Science at the University of Lagos, graduating with a Second Class Upper Division in 1977, and subsequently earned a Master of Business Administration (MBA) from the same roaduniversity in 1980

== Career ==
Michael Eleonu Anwuri began his professional career as an Assistant Lecturer at the Rivers State School of Basic Studies, Rumuola, after completing the National Youth Service Corps programme. He later joined the banking industry, working at International Merchant Bank (IMB), NAL Merchant Bank Limited, Commercial Bank of Africa (CBA), where he rose to General Manager/Acting Managing Director/Chief Executive Officer, and Union Merchant Bank, from which he retired in 2006. Following his retirement, he worked as a financial consultant through Brace Concepts Ltd. and co-founded Pillargate Bureau de Change. In December 2015, Governor Nyesom Wike appointed him Commissioner for Power in Rivers State, a position he held until 2017.

== Political appointment ==
After retiring from the banking sector, Anwuri joined partisan politics and became a member of the People's Democratic Party (PDP). He was appointed Commissioner for Power in Rivers State in December 2015 and served until 2017, overseeing the Ministry of Power.

== Personal life ==
Anwuri was married to Dr. Adesuwa Anwuri (née Ukponmwan). They married on 2 May 1981 and had three children. He was also a member and former chairman of the Ogbakor Ikwerre Organisation, Lagos.

== Death ==
Michael Eleonu Anwuri died on 3 June 2020 at the age of 65 after a brief illness.

== See also ==
- List of people from Rivers State
