= 2017 Rivers State budget =

2017 Budget of the Rivers State government
- Submitted: 28 December 2016
- Submitted by: Ezenwo Nyesom Wike
- Submitted to: 8th Rivers State House of Assembly
- Country: Rivers State
- Party: Rivers State People's Democratic Party
- Total revenue: ₦470 billion (estimated)
- Total expenditures: ₦470 billion (requested)

The 2017 Rivers State budget was the financial statement of the Rivers State government presenting its proposed revenues and spending for the 2017 fiscal year. It was named the Golden Jubilee Budget for Accelerated Development to mark the state's 50th anniversary in 2017. It was presented before the House on 28 December 2016 by Governor Ezenwo Nyesom Wike. This was Governor Wike's second budget submitted as governor.

The budget was approved by the House of Assembly on 30 December 2016 and signed into law by the governor on 13 January 2017. During the signing ceremony, Governor Wike expressed his gratitude for its quick passage, and thanked the legislators for supporting the Executive to provide basic infrastructure to Riverians.

== Funding sources ==
- Internally Generated Revenue (IGR): ₦169 billion (est.)
- Statutory Allocation: ₦23 billion
- 13% Derivation proceeds: ₦102 billion
- Value Added Tax (VAT) and exchange gains: ₦24.6 billion
- Paris Club and other reimbursements: ₦70 billion
- Capital receipts: ₦400 million
- Federation Account Allocation Committee (FAAC): ₦220 billion

== Expenses ==
The budget estimate proposed was ₦470 billion while ₦141 billion was proposed for recurrent expenditure. Out of this, ₦62 billion was allocated to personnel emolument, ₦3 billion to service FGN bonds, ₦20 billion for payment of pensions and gratuities with overhead costs at ₦17 billion.

Furthermore, projected capital expenditure was ₦329 billion, which gave capital to recurrent expenditure ratio of 70:30. In terms of allocation, the figure showed that ₦14.160 billion was allocated to administration, ₦115.245 billion to the economy, ₦3.050 billion to law and justice, ₦125.630 to the social sector and ₦70.915 billion to special heads.

== Governor's main priorities ==
In his budget message to the legislature, Governor Wike identified the following issues are main priorities for his executive budget.

=== Infrastructure development ===
₦77,409,275,000 – accelerate the development and expansion of infrastructure

=== Education ===
₦30 billion – invest in providing educational infrastructure and improving the quality of education

=== Health ===
₦27 billion – healthcare delivery

=== Youth and women empowerment ===
- ₦1 billion – Youth and Women Enterprise Development and Empowerment Fund
- ₦13 billion – implement various youth and women development and empowerment programmes, including building of women development center and soccer academy

=== Security ===
- ₦15 billion – improve the existing security architecture, including the provision of logistics to enhance the capacity of the security agencies to investigate, monitor, identify and track down criminals and secure the state
