= Austin Tam-George =

Nigerian academic

Commissioner for Information and Communications, Rivers State
- In office 21 December 2015 – 23 June 2017
- Governor: Nyesom Wike
- Preceded by: Ibim Semenitari

Personal details
- Born: Okrika, Rivers State, Nigeria
- Occupation: Academic, communication consultant
- Known for: Communication and public policy

Austin Tam-George is a Nigerian academic and communication consultant who served in the Rivers State Government as the Commissioner for Information and Communication, from 21 December 2015 to 23 June 2017 when he voluntarily resigned from his post in Governor Nyesom Wike's Cabinet.

Tam-George studied leadership and public policy at Harvard Kennedy School in Cambridge, Massachusetts, and earned a Ph.D. from the University of the Witwatersrand in South Africa.

He was also an Andrew W. Mellon Postdoctoral Research Fellow and lecturer at the Centre for African Studies, University of Cape Town, South Africa.

Tam-George joined the executive education programme at the IESE Business School, University of Navarra, Spain, focusing on communication, leadership, and educational development.

As a member of the Harvard Business Review (HBR) Advisory Council, an opt-in research community of business professionals, Tam-George contributes to advancing global discourse on strategy, leadership, and public problem-solving.

He served as Technical Advisor to UNESCO at its global conference on the impact of COVID-19 on the education of young people in Africa and around the world.

Tam-George also served as a Research Consultant to the New Partnership for Africa’s Development (NEPAD) in its good governance monitoring projects across Africa.

At the School of Media and Communication, Pan-Atlantic University in Lagos, Nigeria, where he was a lecturer, Tam-George helped lead curricula innovations at the intersection of communication, law, and corporate strategy.

Since 2010, Dr. Tam-George has designed and facilitated high-impact communication training for lawyers, judges, and legal advocates. His custom-built courses have been attended by over 10,000 lawyers and law school students, equipping them with strategic influence, persuasive advocacy, and ethical public engagement skills essential for 21st-century legal practice.

His keynote address on Strategic Influence in Legal Practice delivered at a virtual seminar organized by the Nigerian Bar Association Institute of Continuing Legal Education on 6 July 2025 was attended by over 2500 lawyers, including the Bar president Afam Osigwe.

Before his appointment into Government, Tam-George was the executive director of the Institute of Communication and Corporate Studies in Lagos.

== Education ==
Tam-George was a Senior Executive Fellow at Harvard Kennedy School in Cambridge, Massachusetts, USA, where he studied leadership and public policy [October 2022 cohort).

He received his Ph.D. from the University of the Witwatersrand, South Africa in 2007 and attended the IESE Business School in Barcelona, where he studied communication and leadership in the International Faculty Programme in 2011.

Tam-George earned a master's degree in English from the University of Ibadan, Nigeria (1998).

== Career ==
As an academic, he taught at Pan-African University in Nigeria and at University of Cape Town where he was an Andrew W. Mellon Postdoctoral Research Fellow.

In 2008, he worked as research consultant to the New Partnership for Africa’s Development in its good governance monitoring projects across Africa.

=== Commissioner of Information and Communications ===
On 9 December 2015, the House of Assembly voted unanimously to confirm Tam-George as Governor Wike's choice to succeed Ibim Semenitari as the Commissioner of Information and Communications. On 18 December 2015, he was officially sworn into office.

== See also ==
- List of people from Rivers State
- Information and Communications Technology
