= Christy Nwankwo =

Nigerian judge

President of the Rivers State Customary Court of Appeal
- Incumbent
- Assumed office 25 April 2016
- Appointed by: Ezenwo Nyesom Wike
- Preceded by: Peter Agumagu

Personal details
- Born: 30 August 1968 (age 57) Rivers State, Nigeria
- Parent: Christiana Watson Gabriel (mother)
- Profession: Lawyer

Christina Nwankwo (née Gabriel; born 30 August 1968), also known professionally as Christy Nwankwo, is a Judge in Rivers State, Nigeria. Since 25 April 2016, she is the substantive President of the Rivers State Customary Court of Appeal. From 2015 until her substantive appointment, she served as acting President of the court, taking over from Peter Agumagu.
