= Alice Okolo Bridge =

- Coordinates: 4.74067°N 6.77175°E
- Locale: Obonoma and Abonnema in Akuku-Toru
- Official name: Alice Okolo Bridge
- Maintained by: Rivers State Ministry of Works

History
- Opened: 1 September 2015

Location
- Interactive map of Alice Okolo Bridge

The Alice Okolo Bridge (also known as Abonnema-Obonoma Bridge) is a culvert bridge in Akuku-Toru local government area, Rivers State, Nigeria, connecting the town of Obonoma to the town of Abonnema. Construction began in 2003 but was abandoned during the administration of Chibuike Amaechi. It was later completed and commissioned by Governor Ezenwo Wike on 1 September 2015.
