= Rivers State Civil Service Commission =

The Rivers State Civil Service Commission is a statutorily constituted executive body authorized to oversee the development and administration of the state's civil service system. It also has power to make appointments, exercise disciplinary control and remove persons holding or acting in offices within the civil service. The Commission is headed by a Chairman, who is appointed by the Governor with the consent of the State House of Assembly.

== Composition ==
Part II, section 197 (1), of the Constitution of 1999 (Third Schedule) specifies: "A State Civil Service Commission shall comprise the following members -"

1. A Chairman
2. Not less than two and not more than four other persons, who shall, in the opinion of the Governor, be persons of unquestionable integrity and sound political judgment.

== See also ==
- Government of Rivers State
- List of government agencies of Rivers State
