= Rivers State Local Government Service Commission =

The Rivers State Local Government Service Commission is a statutory body established under the Local Government Law that is generally concerned with matters relating to recruitment of persons into the local government, their development, promotion, discipline and removal from service. The commission also serves as an impartial adjudicator between the local government authorities and employees to ensure efficiency and effectiveness at local government level. The chairperson and members of the commission are appointed by the Governor of Rivers State, subject to confirmation by the Rivers State House of Assembly.

== See also ==
- Government of Rivers State
- List of government agencies of Rivers State
