= Bright Jacob =

Nigerian politician

Bright Onyebuchi Jacob is a Nigerian politician and a former chairman of Oyigbo Local Government Council. He is a member of the Rivers State People's Democratic Party, and is the current Commissioner of Commerce and Industry since December 2015.
