= Rivers State Ministry of Budget and Economic Planning =

Government ministry in Nigeria

Ministry overview
- Jurisdiction: Government of Rivers State
- Headquarters: 22, Williams Jumbo Street, Old GRA, Port Harcourt, Nigeria; 4°46′22″N 7°0′54″E
- Ministry executives: Charles Gogo, Commissioner; Awoye H. Bob-Manuel, Permanent Secretary

The Rivers State Ministry of Budget and Economic Planning is a government ministry of Rivers State, Nigeria responsible for drafting economic priorities and programmes of government as well as sporadic methods of implementation, with a view to improving the standard of living and quality of life of the citizenry. The ministry also handles "the preparation of the Rivers State annual budget as well as ensure that budget implementation is in accordance with the policy of the state government."

== See also ==
- List of government ministries of Rivers State
