= Rivers State Sustainable Development Agency =

Government agency in Rivers state, Nigeria

The Rivers State Sustainable Development Agency (RSSDA) is an agency of the government of Rivers State set up under the Sustainable Development Agency Law No. 3 of 2007. It is an agency dedicated to promoting programmes and activities aimed at eradicating poverty, developing rural areas and empowering the youth. It succeeds the Rivers State Sustainable Development Program (RSSDP) originally introduced by the federal government to improve lives of ordinary people in the state. Its headquarters can be found at 1 Igbodo Street in Old GRA, Port Harcourt.

== See also ==
- List of government agencies of Rivers State
