= Rufus Godwins =

Nigerian lawyer and civil servant

Rufus NkereAwaji Godwins

Head of Service of Rivers State
- In office 2015–2017
- Governor: Nyesom Wike

Solicitor-General and Permanent Secretary, Rivers State Ministry of Justice

Permanent Secretary, Rivers State Ministry of Environment

Director of Public Prosecutions, Rivers State

Personal details
- Occupation: Lawyer, civil servant

Rufus NkereAwaji Godwins is a lawyer and civil servant in Rivers State, Nigeria. He is the former Head of Service under the administration of Governor Ezenwo Wike. Prior to his appointment, he had served as the Director of Public Prosecutions in Rivers State. He went on to serve as Permanent Secretary of Rivers State Ministry of Environment and as Solicitor-General & Permanent Secretary of the Rivers State Ministry of Justice.

== See also ==
- List of people from Rivers State
