= Ibibia Walter =

Nigerian politician (born 1967)

The Honorable Ibibia Walter

Commissioner Rivers State Ministry of Transport
- Incumbent
- Assumed office 30 August 2017
- Governor: Ezenwo Nyesom Wike
- Preceded by: Akie Dagogo Fubara

Rivers State Commissioner of Water Resources and Rural Development
- In office 18 December 2015 – 24 June 2017
- Governor: Ezenwo Nyesom Wike
- Preceded by: Patricia Simon Hart
- Succeeded by: Kaniye Ebeku

Secretary of the Rivers State People's Democratic Party
- In office 2013–2015
- Preceded by: Adokiye Oruwari
- Succeeded by: Sam Okpoko

Personal details
- Born: Ibibia Opuene Walter; 8 July 1967 (age 59) Isaka, Okrika, Rivers State, Nigeria
- Party: PDP
- Education: University of Port Harcourt
- Profession: Geologist

Ibibia Opuene Walter (born 8 July 1967) is a geologist, businessman and politician in Rivers State, Nigeria. From 2004 to 2007, he served as Chairman of Okrika Local Government Council. From 2013 to 2015, he served as Secretary of the Rivers State People's Democratic Party.

Walter is the founder and major shareholder of Lowpel and Geowaltek Nigeria Limited. He is currently the Commissioner Rivers State Ministry of Transport.

== Biography ==
=== Early life and education ===
Walter was born in Isaka town, Okrika local government area of Rivers State to Chief Livington and Mrs. Amisodiki Walter. He attended State School Isaka between 1972 and 1978. He received his secondary education at Okrika Grammar School and Government Sea School from 1979 to 1983. He then moved to Rivers State School of Basic Studies in Port Harcourt where he studied for A-Levels.

Walter's university education began with an admission to the University of Port Harcourt. He completed his BSc degree in Geology and acquired a postgraduate diploma in Applied Geology. He later earned his master's degree in Engineering and Hydrogeology from the same university.

== Other ==
Walter is a traditional Chief and head of Pelebo-Nworlu War Canoe House of Isaka. He has a wife and two daughters, Lolia and Sambi.
