= Ikwerre =

Ikwerre may refer to:

- Ikwerre people
- Ikwerre language
- Ikwerre, Rivers, Nigeria
