= Theophilus Odagme =

Medical doctor from Nigeria

The Honorable Theophilus Odagme

Rivers State Commissioner of Health
- In office 18 December 2015 – 15 February 2017
- Governor: Ezenwo Nyesom Wike
- Preceded by: Sampson Parker

Personal details
- Born: Theophilus M-Iyenebari Odagme; 3 February 1974 (age 52) Baen, Khana, Rivers State, Nigeria
- Education: University of Port Harcourt (MBBS)
- Profession: Medical doctor

Theophilus M-Iyenebari Odagme (born 3 February 1974) is a medical doctor from Rivers State, Nigeria who was the commissioner of the Rivers State Ministry of Health from 2015 to 2017.

== Early life and education ==
Odagme was born in Baen community in Khana local government area of Rivers State. He received his primary and secondary education at Army Children School from 1979 to 1985, and Birabi Memorial Grammar School from 1985 to 1991. After obtaining his First School Leaving Certificate and Senior School Certificate, he proceeded to the University of Port Harcourt, where he earned his Bachelor of Medicine, Bachelor of Surgery degree in 1999. He served as a house officer at the University of Port Harcourt Teaching Hospital from 2000 to 2001 before going on the one-year mandatory National Youth Service in 2002. He later procured a diploma in Anaesthesia from the West African College of Surgeons in 2005.

== Career ==
Odagme had his residency training in Anaesthesia and Intensive Care from 2003 to 2010. He worked briefly in the Department of Anaesthesia, Niger Delta University Teaching Hospital from 2011 to 2012.

He thereafter joined the Rivers State Hospital Management Board as a consultant anaesthetist. He was transferred to the Department of Anaesthesia, Braithwaite Memorial Specialist Hospital where he worked as clinical coordinator from 2012 to 2014. He rose to become Head of the Department of Anaesthesia, a position he held until his appointment as Rivers State Commissioner of Health in December 2015.

Governor Wike relieved him of this post in February 2017.

== Fellowships and memberships ==
- Fellow, West African College of Surgeons
- Member, Nigerian Medical Association
- Member, Medical and Dental Consultants Association
- Member, Nigerian Society of Anaesthetists
- Member, League of Obstetric Anaesthetists of Nigeria
- Member, Nigerian Institute of Management
