= Rivers State Ministry of Employment Generation and Empowerment =

Government ministry of Rivers State, Nigeria

Ministry overview
- Formed: July 2003
- Jurisdiction: Government of Rivers State
- Headquarters: 8th Floor, State Secretariat; Port Harcourt, Rivers State, Nigeria; 4°46′21″N 7°1′1″E
- Ministry executive: Ipalibo Harry, Commissioner
- Website: www.riversjobs.gov.ng

The Rivers State Ministry of Employment Generation and Empowerment is a government ministry of Rivers State, Nigeria formed in July 2003, with a goal to "provide individual citizens with gainful employment and to empower them with skills to become self-reliant." The current Commissioner in charge of the ministry is Dr. Ipalibo Harry.

== See also ==
- List of government ministries of Rivers State
