= Damiete H. Miller =

Damiete Herbert Miller

Commissioner for Social Welfare and Rehabilitation, Rivers State
- In office 2015–2019
- Governor: Nyesom Wike

Personal details
- Occupation: Politician

Damiete Herbert Miller served as the Commissioner of Social Welfare and Rehabilitation in the First Executive Council of Governor Ezenwo Nyesom Wike. He was reappointed to the same position in September 2017.
