= Rivers State Ministry of Chieftaincy and Community Affairs =

Ministry overview
- Jurisdiction: Government of Rivers State
- Headquarters: 11th Floor, State Secretariat, Port Harcourt, Rivers State, Nigeria; 4°46′22″N 7°1′1″E
- Ministry executive: Sylvanus Nwankwo, Commissioner

The Rivers State Ministry of Chieftaincy and Community Affairs is the government ministry that administers issues related to chieftaincy and community in Rivers State, Nigeria. The ministry has its headquarters at 11th floor, State Secretariat, Port Harcourt. Incumbent commissioner is Sylvanus Nwankwo.

== List of commissioners ==
- Charles Okaye
- John Bazia
- Sylvanus Nwankwo

== See also ==
- List of government ministries of Rivers State
