= Roseline Konya =

Nigerian academic

Roseline Sonayee Konya
- Born: Khana, Rivers State
- Occupations: An academic; politician
- Known for: Rivers State Commissioner for Environment; Toxicology and Pharmacology
- Notable work: SEARCHING THE SOUL OF THE ENVIRONMENT, WHO DARE? TERRITORIANS OR SUBDUERS?

Roseline Sonayee Konya is a Nigerian academic and a politician from Khana, Rivers State. She is a professor of Toxicology and Pharmacology at the University of Port Harcourt. She served as Commissioner for Environment in the cabinet of Governor Peter Odili and was re-appointed to the same office in the cabinet of Governor Ezenwo Nyesom Wike. She was also the Chairman of Civil Service Commission in 1997.

== Background and education ==
Born in Buan, Khana Local Government Area of Rivers State, Nigeria. Professor Konya attended St Arthur's Anglican Primary School, Buan from there she moved on to Mercy Secondary School, Okigwe (in present-day Imo State, Nigeria) for her secondary education. This was however disrupted by the Nigerian Civil War, which began in late 1967. In 1968, while the war was still raging, she got enrolled into Holy Rosary Secondary School, Port Harcourt where she continued her secondary school education until 1969. From 1970 to 1971, she pursued studies for her A-level in St. Anne's School, Ibadan, from where she proceeded to The Council for National Academic Awards (CNAA), UK, where she obtained her bachelor's degree in Science in 1976 and 1977 obtained a master's degree from Loughborough University. In 1984, Konya rounded off her Doctorate Degree program in Brunel University, London.

== Career ==
Konya began her career as an Assistant Lecturer at the University of Port Harcourt in 1979, after which she moved on to Brunel University, London, where she obtained her Ph.D. She returned to Nigeria in 1984 and continued as a lecturer at the University of Port Harcourt. Before being appointed as the Rivers State Commissioner for Environment, she held several positions and these include:

- Chairman, Protocol Subcommittee of Convocation Committee (1990)
- Director, Delta Rubber Company (1991–1993)
- Commissioner, Civil Service Commission (1993–1996)
- Chairman, Civil Service Commission (1997–1999)
- HOD, Animal and Environmental Biology Department (2001–2003)
- Member, Academic Advisory Board, Institute of Petroleum Studies (IPS)
- Dean, School of Graduate Studies
- Pioneer Provost, School of Graduate Studies

In the year 2003, Konya got promoted to the position of Professor of Animal and Environmental Biology.

She is the chairman of, the Technical Committee for the implementation of the Recommendations of the Rivers State Government Report on Soot

== Awards ==
- The Distinguished Leadership Award in Environmental Technology by the British Society of Commerce in recognition of meritorious achievements and leadership prominence in 2004.
- She was cited in the WHO IS WHO for Excellence in Management Intelligence Special Merit Award in October, 2008
- Merit Award by Animal and Environmental Biology Students Association as Most Outstanding Lecturer - September, 2010
- Award by the Committee of Deans and Provosts of Post Graduate School (CDPGS) in Nigeria – December, 2012

== Personal life ==
Roseline Konya was married to the late Barido Konya, with whom she had three children.

She is the pioneer chairman of the Methodist Knights Council – Port Harcourt Archdiocese; and the first female Methodist Knight in Rivers and Bayelsa States.
