= Captain Elechi Amadi Polytechnic =

Private polytechnic in River state Nigeria

- Former names: Rivers State College of Arts and Science; Rivers State School of Basic Studies; Port Harcourt Polytechnic
- Type: Public
- Established: 1987; 39 years ago
- Chairman: Evang.Hope Ikiriko PhD
- Rector: Dr. Moses Saroh Neebee
- Location: Rumuola, Port Harcourt, Rivers State, Nigeria
- Campus: Urban
- Website: elechiamadipolytechnic.com

Captain Elechi Amadi Polytechnic (formerly known as Rivers State School of Basic Studies, Rivers State College of Arts and Science and later Port Harcourt Polytechnic) is a polytechnic funded by the Government of Rivers State, located in Rumuola Port Harcourt, Rivers State, Nigeria.

Port Harcourt Polytechnic was changed to Captain Elechi Amadi Polytechnic by the Governor of Rivers State, Nyesom Ezenwo Wike CON, who signed the Port Harcourt Polytechnic Bill into law on 4 July 2016.

== History ==
The school originated on 19 April 1984 when the military governor of the state, Police Commissioner Fidelis Oyakhilome, signed the edict establishing Rivers State School of Basic Studies. The edict took effect in November 1987 when the school started operating as a tertiary institution affiliated to the University of Ibadan. Later it was affiliated to the Ahmadu Bello University, Zaria for pre-degree IJMB (Interim Joint Matriculation Board) courses.

In 1999, the school was restructured as the Rivers State College of Arts and Science with the mandate to offer courses leading to award of Diplomas and certificates in various disciplines besides school certificates and IJMB. The college had three schools: Arts, Science and Preliminary Studies and the Institute of Continuing Education.

In 2006, the National Board for Technical Education (NBTE) granted RIVCAS permission to offer courses leading to award of the National Diploma (ND). RIVCAS thus became a Polytechnic funded by Rivers State government and supervised by the NBTE. In June 2016, the Rivers State House of Assembly passed a bill renaming the Rivers State College of Arts and Science to Port Harcourt Polytechnic. The Governor of Rivers State, Chief (Barrister) Nyesom Ezenwo Wike CON, signed the Port Harcourt Polytechnic Bill into law on 4 July 2016. The Port Harcourt Polytechnic Law 2016 governs the Elechi Amadi Polytechnic.

== Departments ==
=== Academic departments ===
The schools, institutes and polytechnic departments are as follows:

Schools and Institutes

- Business and Administrative Studies
- Continuing Education (Institute)
- Engineering Technology
- Environmental Science
- Financial Studies
- Foundation and General Studies
- Information and Communication Technology
- Legal Studies
- Science and Technology

Departments

- Accountancy
- Agricultural Technology
- Architectural Technology
- Banking and Finance
- Building Technology
- Business Administration and Management
- Computer Engineering
- Computer Science
- Electrical/Electronics Engineering Technology
- Estate Management and Valuation
- Foundation Studies
- General Studies
- Law
- Library and Information Science
- Marketing
- Mass Communication
- Office Technology and Management
- Public Administration
- Science Laboratory Technology
- Statistics
- Surveying and Geo-Informatics
- Transportation Planning and Management
- Urban and Regional Planning.

== Governing council ==
The governor of Rivers State, Governor Siminalayi Fubara, inaugurated a new governing council for the various educational institutions within the state, which also included Elechi Amadi Polytechnic.

== See also ==
- List of polytechnics in Nigeria
- Education in Nigeria
