= Princewill A. Chike =

Nigerian physician

Princewill Anthony Chike (born 28 June ?) is a Nigerian physician and professor of medicine. He was chairman of the Rivers State Primary Health Care Management Board. On 31 August 2017, he was sworn in as a member of second Wike Executive Council. He was chosen to head the Ministry of Health as Commissioner in September 2017.
