= Rivers State Housing and Property Development Authority =

Afforable housing agency in Nigeria

The Rivers State Housing and Property Development Authority (RSHPDA) is a government agency that has the task of preservation and delivery of affordable housing in Rivers State, Nigeria. It was established under the Housing and Property Development Authority Law No.14 of 1985. Its main goal is to reduce homelessness. It also manages all government-owned housing estates. In December 2013, the agency's general manager and chief executive officer was Iyerefa Cookey-Gam.

== Organizational structure ==
The RSHPDA is governed by a board of directors which is charged with policy, control and management of the Authority. This includes the general manager, secretary to the authority and internal auditor.

== Departments and units ==
There are seven departments under the RSHPDA:

- Administrative Department
- Estate Department
- Projects Department
- Research & Planning
- Accounts Department
- Legal Unit
- Audit Unit

== See also ==
- List of government agencies of Rivers State
