= Ukel Oyaghiri =

Nigerian lawyer and politician (born 1964)

Rivers State Commissioner of Women Affairs
- Preceded by: Joeba West

Personal details
- Born: 1964 (age 61–62)
- Party: Peoples Democratic Party
- Education: Rivers State School of Basic Studies, University of Port Harcourt, Rivers State University of Science and Technology, Nigerian Law School.
- Occupation: Lawyer, Politician
- Profession: Lawyer

Ukel Oyaghiri (born 1964) is a lawyer and politician who has served as the Rivers State Commissioner of Women Affairs since 2015. She replaced Joeba West who had served in the Executive Council under former governor Chibuike Amaechi.

== Education ==
Oyaghiri attended Rivers State School of Basic Studies in Port Harcourt where she obtained her West African Senior School Certificate. She earned a B.A.ED. Hons. degree from the University of Port Harcourt in 1989. Her LL.B. and B.L. qualifications were obtained from the Rivers State University of Science and Technology and the Nigerian Law School respectively.

== Career ==
She worked as public relations assistant in Rivbank Insurance Company from 1989 to 1990, public administrative officer in Pamo Clinics & Hospitals Limited from 1990 to 1997, personal assistant to Bayelsa State Commissioner of Education from 1997 to 1998 and legal officer in Adedipe & Adedipe Legal Practitioners from 2004 to 2007. She was the managing solicitor of A.S. Oyaghiri & Associates Legal Practitioners from 2011, until her appointment in December 2015 as Commissioner of Women Affairs.

== Other positions held ==
- Chairman, Rivers State Taekwondo Association (1996–1998)
- Vice Chairman, Taekwondo Association of Nigeria (1993–1996)
- President of Orashi Women Association and Secretary Elder`s Forum, Voice of Orashi.

== Memberships ==
- Member, Nigerian Bar Association
- Member, International Federation of Women Lawyers
- Member, International Bar Association
