= Kenneth Kobani =

Nigerian politician

Kenneth Bie Kobani

Secretary to the Rivers State Government
- In office June 2015 – 2019
- Governor: Nyesom Wike

Minister of State for Industry, Trade and Investment
- President: Goodluck Jonathan

Rivers State Commissioner of Finance

Rivers State Commissioner of Commerce and Industry

Personal details
- Born: Port Harcourt, Rivers State, Nigeria
- Occupation: Politician

Kenneth Bie Kobani is a Nigerian politician of the People's Democratic Party. He is a former Rivers State Commissioner of Finance, and was previously a Commissioner of Commerce and Industry. He was a former National Treasurer of the defunct Action Congress of Nigeria (ACN).He served as a minister in the Cabinet of President Jonathan, serving as the Minister of State for Industry, Trade and Investment. He is a former Secretary to the State Government in Rivers State, a position to which he was appointed in June 2015. and left office in 2019.

== Early life ==
Kobani was born in Port Harcourt, Rivers State, Nigeria. He is the son of Chief Nna Edward Kobani,(Tonsimene Gokana), a politician who was murdered at Giokoo, Gokana on 21 May 1994.

== Memberships ==
- Member, Honourable Society of the Inner Temple and Barrister at Law in the UK.

Knight of the Catholic Church, of the Order of St. Mulumba.

== See also ==
- List of people from Rivers State
