= Chukwuemeka Woke =

Nigerian politician

Director-General/Chief Executive Officer of the National Oil Spill Detection and Response Agency
- Incumbent
- Assumed office 10 June 2024

Managing Director/Chief Executive Officer of the Ogun-Osun River Basin Development Authority
- In office 9 May 2024 – 22 May 2024

Commissioner for Special Projects, Rivers State
- In office 2023–2023
- Governor: Siminalayi Fubara

Chief of Staff to the Governor of Rivers State
- In office 2015–2023
- Governor: Nyesom Wike

Chairman of Emohua Local Government Area

Personal details
- Occupation: Engineer, politician

Chukwuemeka Woke (also known as Emeka Woke) is a Nigerian engineer and politician of the People's Democratic Party. He has served as chairman of the Emohua local government area in Rivers State. In June 2015, former Governor Ezenwo Wike appointed him as the Chief of Staff of Rivers State Government. He was nominated as a commissioner designate in June 2023 and was subsequently sworn in as commissioner for special projects under the administration of Siminalayi Fubara. He resigned on May 9, 2024, and was appointed Managing Director/CEO of the Ogun-Osun River Basin Development Authority. On May 22, 2024, he was re-assigned as Director General/Chief Executive Officer of the National Oil Spill Detection and Response Agency, assuming office on June 10, 2024.

== Career ==
Chukwuemeka Woke is an engineer and environmental specialist. He worked with the Environmental, Safety and Operations Departments of the Nigerian National Petroleum Corporation (NNPC).

]In 2024, he was appointed Director-General and Chief Executive Officer of the National Oil Spill Detection and Response Agency (NOSDRA), where he oversees Nigeria's oil spill detection, response and environmental protection activities.

== Political career ==
Woke is a member of the Peoples Democratic Party (PDP). He served as Chairman of Emohua Local Government Area before holding executive appointments in the Rivers State Government. In June 2015, Governor Nyesom Wike appointed Woke as Chief of Staff, Government House, Port Harcourt. He served in that capacity throughout the Wike administration and was reappointed in 2022 following the dissolution and reconstitution of the State Executive Council.

Following the inauguration of Governor Siminalayi Fubara in 2023, Woke was appointed Commissioner for Special Projects. He resigned the position in May 2024 after receiving a federal appointment. President Bola Tinubu subsequently appointed him Managing Director of the Ogun–Osun River Basin Development Authority before reassigning him as Director-General and Chief Executive Officer of the National Oil Spill Detection and Response Agency (NOSDRA), where he assumed office in June 2024.

== Controversies ==
The state arrested Woke for leading a squad in two sport utility vehicles that followed and opened fire on Dakuku Peterside.

== See also ==
- List of people from Rivers State
