= Rivers State Ministry of Information and Communications =

Ministry overview
- Jurisdiction: Government of Rivers State
- Headquarters: 3rd Floor, State Secretariat Port Harcourt, Rivers State, Nigeria; 4°46′21″N 7°1′1″E
- Ministry executive: Paulinus Nsirim, Commissioner
- Website: http://www.rsmoic.gov.ng

The Rivers State Ministry of Information and Communications is a ministry within the Government of Rivers State that is entrusted with formulating and implementing strategies to develop and promote the media sector in the state. The ministry is also responsible for the management and dissemination of information on government policies, programmes and activities. The Incumbent commissioner is Paulinus Nsirim.

== See also ==
- List of government ministries of Rivers State
