= Rivers State Ministry of Finance =

Ministry overview
- Jurisdiction: Government of Rivers State
- Headquarters: 1st - 4th Floors, State Secretariat; Port Harcourt, Rivers State, Nigeria; 4°46′21″N 7°1′1″E
- Ministry executive: Isaac Kamalu, Commissioner

The Rivers State Ministry of Finance is a government ministry of Rivers State, Nigeria that is charged with the responsibility of handling matters related to the finance administration of the state. The ministry's main goal is implementing government financial policies to ensure maximum productivity and positive impact on the lives of the citizens. Incumbent commissioner of the ministry is Barrister Isaac Kamalu appointed in 2019.

== List of Finance Commissioners ==
- 2011: Chamberlain S. Peterside
- 2015: Fred Kpakol
- 2019: Isaac Kamalu

== See also ==
- List of government ministries of Rivers State
