= Ipalibo Banigo =

Nigerian politician and doctor (born 1952)

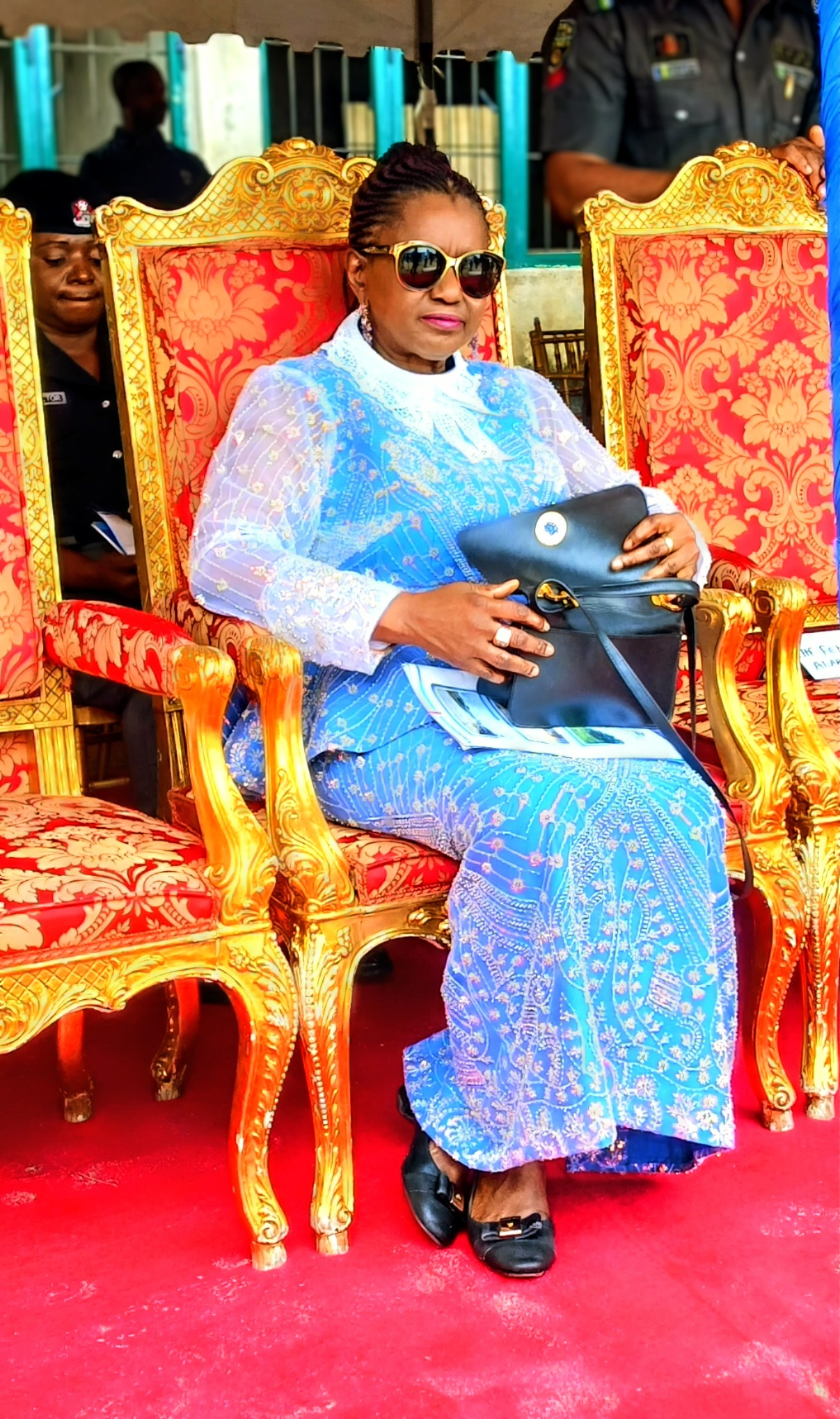

Senator for Rivers West
- Incumbent
- Assumed office 13 June 2023
- Preceded by: Betty Apiafi

6th Deputy Governor of Rivers State
- In office 29 May 2015 – 29 May 2023
- Governor: Ezenwo Wike
- Preceded by: Tele Ikuru
- Succeeded by: Ngozi Odu

Secretary to the Rivers State Government
- In office 5 October 1995 – 5 July 1999

Personal details
- Born: Ipalibo Harry; 20 December 1952 (age 73) Degema, Southern Region, British Nigeria (now in Rivers State, Nigeria)
- Party: Peoples Democratic Party
- Education: Queen's College, Lagos; University College Hospital, Ibadan; Harvard University; University of London
- Profession: Politician; medical doctor

Ipalibo Gogo Banigo (née Harry; born 20 December 1952) in Obuama, Degema, Rivers State. She is a Nigerian medical doctor and politician who is the current senator representing Rivers West Senatorial District since 2023. She served as the first female deputy governor of Rivers State from 2015 to 2023.

A member of the Peoples Democratic Party, she held various important offices at the Rivers State Ministry of Health. During her service, she assumed the positions of Director of Public Health Services, Acting Commissioner, Director-General and Permanent Secretary. She achieved prominence first in 1995, as Secretary to the Government of Rivers State before serving as Head of Service of the state. In December 2014, Ezenwo Wike selected her as his running mate in the 2015 election. She was elected deputy governor and assumed office on 29 May 2015.

== Early life and education ==
Banigo was born on 20 December 1952 to the Harry family of Obuama in Degema, Rivers State. As a teenager, she earned the West African School Certificate (Division One) and the Higher School Certificate at Queens College, Lagos. She was awarded prizes for her academic excellence in Chemistry, Biology and English Literature. In 1968, she won the BBC award for Students Poetry.

Prior to graduating from high school, she was the Best All-Round Student of The Year from 1969 to 1970. She obtained a Bachelor of Medicine, Bachelor of Surgery from the University College Hospital, Ibadan, and attended Harvard University School of Public Health for her master's degree. Between 1990 and 1992, Banigo received diplomas in both Tropical Hygiene and Dermatology from the University of London.

== Career ==
Banigo started her career at the Rivers State Port Health Service, where she served as Registrar of Births and Senior Medical Officer-in-charge. She was an honorary consultant dermatologist at the University of Port Harcourt, after which she became principal of Rivers State School of Health Technology in 1985. During her time at the Rivers State Ministry of Health, she held five responsible offices including Director of Public Health Services, Acting Commissioner, Director-General and Permanent Secretary. On 5 October 1995, Banigo was appointed Secretary to the Government of Rivers State, which she would maintain until 5 July 1999. She further served for five months, from May 1998, as Head of Service of Rivers State.

While retired, Banigo continued to provide professional services and was later made Public Health Adviser of the Shell Petroleum Development Company in Nigeria. Additionally, she held the offices of both executive director and Secretary at the National Primary Health Care Development Agency. Some of her memberships are Governing Council of University of Calabar, Governing Board of University of Nigeria Teaching Hospital, Rivers State Food and Nutrition Committee, Rivers State Hospital Management Board and Reference Board DFID. She was also appointed Project Director of UNFPA, UNICEF and Chairman of the Rivers State Relief Committee. In December 2014, she was chosen to be the running mate of gubernatorial candidate Ezenwo Wike in the 2015 election. Both PDP members were elected and took office on 29 May 2015. Banigo previously served as the 6th and first female Deputy Governor of Rivers State.

On April 29, 2021, She was among the Health Consultants present at a colloquium organised by St Racheal's Pharmaceuticals Nigeria to commemorate 2021 World Malaria Day held in Lagos, presenting some of the strategies on how to achieve a Zero-Malaria environment in Nigeria in the next 10 years. On September 20, 2020, she became the Chairperson of seven Man panel inaugurated by Rivers State Governor, Nyesom Wike, to activate some moribund health facilities in the state.

== See also ==
- List of people from Rivers State
- Deputy Governor of Rivers State
