= Boma Iyaye =

Nigerian politician

The Honorable Boma Iyaye

Rivers State Commissioner of Sports
- Incumbent
- Assumed office 18 December 2015
- Governor: Ezenwo Nyesom Wike
- Preceded by: Fred Mbombo Igwe
- In office July 2009 – June 2011
- Governor: Chibuike Amaechi
- Preceded by: Boma Iyaye
- Succeeded by: Fred Mbombo Igwe
- In office 4 April 2008 – 4 June 2009
- Governor: Chibuike Amaechi
- Preceded by: Christopher Green
- Succeeded by: Boma Iyaye

MHA for Ogu–Bolo
- In office 2003–2007
- Preceded by: Adokiye Oruwari
- Succeeded by: Maureen Tamuno

Personal details
- Born: 24 September 1969 (age 56) Ogu Town, Ogu–Bolo, Rivers State, Nigeria
- Party: PDP
- Spouse: Joy Iyaye
- Children: 3
- Education: Rivers State University of Science and Technology
- Profession: Accountant

Boma Iyaye (born 24 September 1969) is a Rivers State accountant, politician and a former Commissioner of Sports.

== Education ==
He was educated at State School II Port Harcourt between 1974 and 1980. He attended Baptist High School for his secondary education from 1981 to 1986. A year later, he enrolled at the Rivers State University of Science and Technology and studied Accountancy. He thereafter completed the one-year mandatory National Youth Service Corps program.

== Career ==
Iyaye began his career in the private sector as an accountant. He worked with several multinational companies between 1992 and 2003. Later he entered into politics and successfully ran for a seat in the Rivers State House of Assembly, where he served until 2007 representing Ogu–Bolo. He was the Chairman of the House Committee on Sports as well as member of other sub-committees at the Assembly.

In December 2015, he was inducted into the Wike Executive Council as the Commissioner of Sports. Iyaye had previously served in the same office from 4 April 2008 to 4 June 2009, and again from July 2009 to June 2011.

28 December 2021, the honourable commissioner was installed as the chief of Chiri War Canoe House of Loko Group of Houses in Ogu Kingdom of Ogu-Bolo Local Government Area of Rivers State
