= Emmanuel Okah =

Nigerian lawyer and politician

Emmanuel Ihuoma Okah

Commissioner for Information and Communications, Rivers State
- In office 2017–2019
- Governor: Nyesom Wike
- Preceded by: Ogbonna Nwuke

Commissioner for Housing, Rivers State
- In office 2015–2017
- Governor: Nyesom Wike

Commissioner for Information, Rivers State
- In office 2007–2007
- Governor: Celestine Omehia

Chief Press Secretary to the Governor of Rivers State
- Governor: Peter Odili

Personal details
- Born: Elele, Ikwerre Local Government Area, Rivers State, Nigeria
- Occupation: Lawyer, politician
- Profession: Legal practitioner
- Nickname: Emma Okah

Emmanuel Ihuoma Okah, commonly known as Emma Okah, is a lawyer and politician in Rivers State. A member of the People's Democratic Party, he served as Chief Press Secretary under Governor Odili, and was also Commissioner of Information under Omehia's government. He has chaired the Media and Publicity Committee of the Rivers State People's Democratic Party Campaign Organisation. After the PDP took over, Governor Ezenwo Wike appointed him to his cabinet. He was confirmed by the House on 5 June 2015 was sworn-in as Housing Commissioner on 12 June 2015.

== Early life and education ==
Emmanuel Ihuoma Okah, popularly known as Emma Okah, is from Elele in Ikwerre Local Government Area of Rivers State, Nigeria.

He attended County Grammar School, Ikwerre/Etche, before studying Law at the University of Calabar, where he obtained a Bachelor of Laws (LL.B.) degree in 1988. He was called to the Nigerian Bar after completing his studies at the Nigerian Law School in 1989 and later earned a Master of Laws (LL.M.) degree from the University of Lagos in 1991.

== Career ==
Emmanuel Ihuoma Okah began his professional career as a lawyer. During his National Youth Service Corps (NYSC), he served as a Legal Officer at Newbreed Magazine, where he later became the company's secretary and established the Chris Okolie Chambers.

Before establishing his own law firm in 1995, Okah worked with the chambers of the late Chief Gani Fawehinmi as a student attaché and later with Rickey Tarfa, SAN. In legal practice, he handled several civil and constitutional matters, including representing Newbreed Magazine and its publisher, Chief Chris Okolie, in a high-profile libel suit instituted by former President Olusegun Obasanjo.

Alongside his legal practice, Okah developed a career in journalism and public communication. He wrote newspaper columns on governance and public affairs and later served as Chief Press Secretary to Rivers State Governor Peter Odili, a position that marked his transition from legal practice into public service.

== Political career ==
Emmanuel Ihuoma Okah transitioned from legal practice and media relations into public service through political appointments in Rivers State.

He served as Chief Press Secretary to Governor Peter Odili.

In 2007, Okah was appointed Commissioner for Information in the administration of Governor Celestine Omehia. Following the political changes that brought Rotimi Amaechi into office, he returned to legal practice and remained active in the Peoples Democratic Party (PDP).

In 2011, Okah sought the Peoples Democratic Party (PDP) nomination to represent Ikwerre/Emohua Federal Constituency in the House of Representatives but was unsuccessful.

Following the election of Governor Nyesom Wike in 2015, Okah was appointed Commissioner for Housing after his nomination was confirmed by the Rivers State House of Assembly. In 2017, he was redeployed as Commissioner for Information and Communications, a position he held in the Rivers State Executive Council.

== Community service ==
Emmanuel Ihuoma Okah has participated in public policy and civic engagement initiatives in Rivers State beyond his service in government.

In 2024, he was appointed Chairman of the Media and Publicity Subcommittee of the Rivers State Investment and Economic Summit.

== See also ==
- List of people from Rivers State
- Rivers State Housing and Property Development Authority
