= Emeka Onowu =

Chukwuemeka Anyasodike Onowu (born 24 December 1984) is the current Rivers State Commissioner of Special Duties. He is also the National Leader of the Non Indigenes Without Borders in Rivers State.

== Education ==
Onowu grew up in Port Harcourt. He went to Community Primary School Rumuopara but finished his secondary education at Akpor Grammar School. He later attended the University of Uyo where he became Chair of the Peace Solidarity Forum. He graduated with a bachelor's degree in Psychology.

Onowu has served as the National Representative of the National Association of Nigerian Students. In 2010, he became the Information and Research Staff for the Akwa Ibom State Newspaper Corporation. That same year, he worked as Senior Staff of INEC and has been the Senior Advert Executive for The Guardian newspaper from 2012 till present.

== Political career ==
Having been made the National Chair of Media and Publicity for the Grassroot Development Initiative, he is also the Chief Press Secretary to GDI, President General and National Leader of the Non Indigenes Without Borders in Rivers State. Onowu was also a member of the Presidential Campaign Rally in Rivers State. He was appointed member of the Rivers State Gubernatorial Inauguration Committee 2015.
