= Rivers State Ministry of Health =

Ministry of the Government of Rivers State

Ministry overview
- Jurisdiction: Government of Rivers State
- Headquarters: Block A, 2nd Floor, State Secretariat; Port Harcourt, Rivers State, Nigeria; 4°46′24″N 7°0′57″E
- Ministry executives: Adaeze Oreh, Commissioner; Somieari Lawrence Isaac-Harry, Permanent Secretary
- Website: www.riversstatemoh.gov.ng

The Rivers State Ministry of Health is a ministry of the Government of Rivers State that facilitates the provision of health services to residents and visitors in Rivers State, Nigeria. Its current headquarters is on the 2nd Floor of State Secretariat Complex, Port Harcourt.

== Leadership ==
The Commissioner is in charge of overseeing the daily activities of the Ministry. The Permanent Secretary supports the general policies and priorities of the government which operates within the context of the management practices and procedures created for the government as a whole. The Permanent Secretary also sees that major projects, policy formulation and direction, sectoral strategies and development plans for the Ministry are implemented.

== Organizational structure ==
=== Departments ===
- Administration
- Finance & Account
- Planning, Research & Statistics
- Pharmaceutical Services
- Medical Services
- Public Health Services
- Nursing Services

=== Parastatals ===
- Rivers State Hospital Management Board
  - Institutions
- College of Health Science and Technology
- Rivers State College of Nursing Sciences, Port Harcourt
  - Rivers State Primary Health Care Management Board

== List of commissioners ==
- Emi Membere-Otaji (1999–2003)
- Solomon Enyinda
- Silas Eneyo
- Tamunoiyoriari Sampson Parker
- Odagme Theophilus (2015–2017)
- Princewill A. Chike (2017–2021)
- Dr. Adaeze Chidinma Oreh (2023 - Present)

== See also ==
- Government of Rivers State
