= Isaac Kamalu =

Nigerian politician

Commissioner for Finance, Rivers State
- In office 2019–2024
- Governor: Nyesom Wike; Siminalayi Fubara
- Preceded by: Fred Kpakol

Commissioner for Budget and Economic Planning, Rivers State
- In office 2015–2019
- Governor: Nyesom Wike

Member of the Rivers State House of Assembly
- In office 2007–2011
- Constituency: Eleme

Chief Whip of the Rivers State House of Assembly
- In office 2007–2011

Personal details
- Born: Alode, Eleme, Rivers State, Nigeria
- Occupation: Politician

Isaac Kamalu is the Rivers State Commissioner for Finance after taking over from Fred Kpakol in 2019. He was the immediate past Rivers State Commissioner of Budget and Economic Planning since December 2015. He is a member of the Rivers State People's Democratic Party.

Isaac Kamalu hails from Alode community. He served as chief whip and member of the Rivers State House of Assembly for the constituency of Eleme from 2007 to 2011.

== Political career ==
Isaac Kamalu is a Nigerian politician from Rivers State. He served as the member representing Eleme Constituency in the Rivers State House of Assembly from 2007 to 2011, during which he served as Chief Whip of the Assembly.

Kamalu was later appointed Commissioner for Budget and Economic Planning in the Rivers State Executive Council under Governor Nyesom Wike. In 2019, he was appointed Commissioner for Finance, succeeding Fred Kpakol.

He continued as Commissioner for Finance under the Wike administration and was retained in the position by Governor Siminalayi Fubara in 2023. He resigned from the office in 2024.

== Legislative Career ==
Isaac Kamalu served as a member of the Rivers State House of Assembly representing Eleme Constituency from 2007 to 2011. During the 6th Rivers State House of Assembly, he served as Chief Whip of the Assembly.
