= Rivers State Civil Service =

Nigerian state civil service

The Rivers State Civil Service (RSCS) is the body of professional civil servants entrusted with the responsibility of carrying out the policies of the Rivers State government in relation to infrastructural development and social service delivery.

== Governance ==
The body is led by the Head of Service (HOS), a member of the executive council, who is the most senior administrative official within the civil service of Rivers State. The civil servants are found mainly in the ministries and parastatals, where they perform their duties, progressing based on qualifications and seniority. The ministries are managed by Permanent Secretaries who report to Commissioners in the executive council.

== Functions ==
RSCS has the following functions:

1. to develop public policies;
2. to implement government policies;
3. to stimulate the public and private sectors of the economy;
4. to monitor policy performance in the public and private sectors;
5. to serve the various organs of the state government.

== Recruitment ==
RSCS is constantly recruiting to find qualified candidates with the skills, educational qualifications and experience to enable it function effectively. The civil service also aims to provide opportunities for citizens to obtain employment. Free application forms are issued by the Rivers State Civil Service Commission to those who wish to become civil servants. Once filled and returned to the commission, the next step for the applicants is to wait to be interviewed. If found eligible, such persons are usually more likely to be employed.

== Civil Service values ==
Certain core values exist within the civil service which all civil servants are expected to share and uphold. These core values are integrity, meritocracy, discipline, professionalism, patriotism, impartiality and secrecy of government information, except where the information divulged conforms with the Freedom of Information Act (FoI).

== See also ==
- List of government ministries of Rivers State
- List of government agencies of Rivers State
