= Desmond Akawor =

Nigerian diplomat and politician

Nigerian Ambassador to South Korea
- In office 24 April 2008 – 6 August 2015
- President: Umaru Musa Yar'Adua; Goodluck Jonathan

Administrator of the Greater Port Harcourt City Development Authority
- Incumbent
- Assumed office 12 June 2015
- Governor: Nyesom Wike

Federal Commissioner, Revenue Mobilisation Allocation and Fiscal Commission
- Incumbent
- Assumed office 2024
- President: Bola Tinubu

Minister of State for the Federal Capital Territory

Commissioner for Water Resources and Rural Development, Rivers State
- In office 1997–1999

Personal details
- Born: December 1, 1964 (age 61) Oyigbo, Rivers State, Nigeria
- Education: Federal Polytechnic, Idah
- Occupation: Diplomat, politician

Desmond Akawor is a diplomat and politician who was Ambassador of Nigeria to South Korea from 24 April 2008 to 6 August 2015. He was appointed Administrator of the Greater Port Harcourt City Development Authority, a position he has held since 12 June 2015. He was the Director-General of the Wike Gubernatorial Campaign Organization.

== Career ==
Desmond Akawor began his professional career with First Aluminium Plc, where he rose to the position of Commercial Manager. He later served as Commissioner for Water Resources and Rural Development in Rivers State, General Manager/Chief Executive Officer of the Niger Delta Basin Development Authority, Executive Director (Engineering and Technical Services) of the Nigerian Ports Authority, and Minister of State for the Federal Capital Territory (FCT). In 2008, he was appointed Nigeria's Ambassador to the Republic of Korea (South Korea), serving until 2015. Following his return to Nigeria, he was appointed Administrator of the Greater Port Harcourt City Development Authority (GPHCDA).

== Political career ==
Desmond Akawor entered politics during the military era, serving as Commissioner for Water Resources and Rural Development in Rivers State. He later held several federal public offices, including Chief Executive Officer of the Niger Delta River Basin Development Authority, Executive Director (Engineering and Technical Services) of the Nigerian Ports Authority, and Minister of State for the Federal Capital Territory (FCT). In March 2020, he was elected Chairman of the Rivers State chapter of the People's Democratic Party (PDP) and served until November 2023, when he resigned following his appointment by President Bola Tinubu as the Federal Commissioner representing Rivers State on the Revenue Mobilisation, Allocation and Fiscal Commission (RMAFC).

== Administration. ==
As Administrator of the Greater Port Harcourt City Development Authority (GPHCDA), Akawor oversaw initiatives relating to urban development, housing, and infrastructure. During his tenure, the authority announced plans to accelerate the Greater Port Harcourt City project, review compensation for affected landowners, strengthen security at project sites, and promote public-private partnerships for housing development.
