= Fred Kpakol =

Rivers State Commissioner of Agriculture
- In office 2019–2022
- Governor: Siminalayi Fubara
- Preceded by: Charles Nwogu
- Succeeded by: Victor Kii

Rivers State Commissioner of Finance
- In office 2015–2019
- Governor: Nyesom Wike
- Preceded by: Chamberlain Peterside
- Succeeded by: Isaac Kamalu

Personal details
- Born: May 26, 1961 (age 65) Baranyonwa Dere, Gokana, Rivers, Nigeria
- Party: Rivers PDP
- Education: B.Sc, Ph.D RSUST; M.Sc FUTO
- Occupation: Accountant

Fred Barivure Kpakol is an accountant and politician. He served as Rivers State Finance Commissioner between 2015 and 2019.He also served as the Commissioner for Agriculture between 2019 and 2022. He is a native of B-Dere in Gokana. He studied accounting and finance at the Rivers State University of Science and Technology and graduated with a B.Sc. in Accounting and Finance. He went further to do his master's degree in Banking and Finance at Federal University of Technology Owerri and he later had his Ph.D. degree in Banking, Finance and Taxation from Rivers State University of Science and Technology. Kpakol is affiliated with the People's Democratic Party and has served as Chairman of Gokana local government area. He is also a former Secretary of the Association of Local Governments of Nigeria Rivers State Branch.

== See also ==
- List of people from Rivers State
