= Kaniye Ebeku =

Kaniye S. A. Ebeku
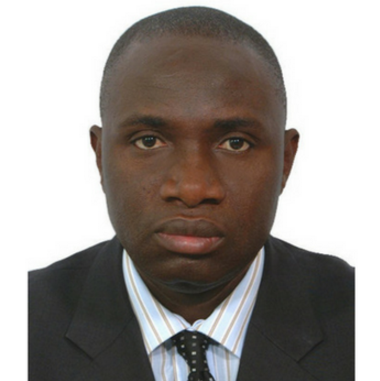

Commissioner for Education, Rivers State
- In office December 2015 – 2017
- Governor: Nyesom Wike

Personal details
- Occupation: Lawyer, professor, politician
- Profession: Law
- Known for: Professor of Law

Kaniye S. A. Ebeku is a Professor of Law and pioneer Dean, Faculty of Law at the University of Port Harcourt, Nigeria. He is the current Rivers State Education Commissioner since December 2015. Ebeku was formerly Dean, Faculty of Law at the University of Calabar, Nigeria; Head of the Department of Law at the University of Nicosia, Cyprus and Head of the Department of Jurisprudence and International Law at the Rivers State University of Science and Technology, Nigeria. He is a practising barrister and solicitor of the Supreme Court of Nigeria. In addition, he is the author of several scholarly articles published in international journals. Dr. Ebeku has served as consultant to the Nigerian federal and state governments as well as to transnational companies, such as transnational oil companies operating in Nigeria.

== Selected works ==
- Ebeku, Kaniye S.A. (2003). "International Law and the Control of Offshore Oil in Nigeria". Verfassung in Recht und Übersee. 36 (3): 457–472. doi:10.5771/0506-7286-2003-3-457. S2CID 112022411.
- 'The Succession of Faure Gnassingbe to the Togolese Presidency: An International Law Perspective' (Nordic Africa Institute, 2006)
- Constitutional and Human Rights Issues in the Implementation of Islamic Law in the Northern States of Nigeria, in Recht in Africa vol. 2 2004)
- A New Dawn for African Women? Prospects of Africa’s Protocol on Women’s Rights in Sri Lanka Journal of International Law vol. 16 (2004), p. 83-138
- The Limited Applicability of Shari'ah under the Constitution of Nigeria, in Constitutionalism in Islamic Countries: Between Upheaval and Continuity (eds. Rainer Grote and Tilmann Roder, OUP, Oxford and London 2011)
