= Tonye Briggs-Oniyide =

Nigerian politician

Rivers State Commissioner for Culture and Tourism
- Incumbent
- Assumed office 18 December 2015
- Governor: Ezenwo Nyesom Wike
- Preceded by: Nnabuihe Imegwu

Personal details
- Born: Port Harcourt, Rivers State, Nigeria
- Education: University of Port Harcourt

Tonye Briggs-Oniyide (born in the mid-1970s) is the current Rivers State Commissioner for Culture and Tourism. She was appointed in 2015 by Governor Ezenwo Nyesom Wike, replacing Nnabuihe Imegwu.

== Early life and education ==
Briggs was born into the Abel Briggs family roots in Akuku-Toru local government area of Rivers State. She attended the University of Port Harcourt for her undergraduate studies, earning a bachelor's degree in Biochemistry.

== Career ==
=== Federal Character Commission ===
Tonye was the Special Assistant to the Governor of Culture and Tourism in River State (2003). Also the Special Adviser to the Governor on Youth and Employment in 2007. Briggs was appointed member of the Federal Character Commission by President Goodluck Jonathan on 9 July 2013. She assumed office on 17 August, representing Rivers State.

=== Culture and Tourism Ministry ===
On 18 December 2015, she assumed office as Rivers State Culture and Tourism Commissioner, taking over the helm of the ministry from Nnabuihe Imegwu. In April 2016, she facilitated a partnership between the Africa Film Academy and the Ministry of Culture and Tourism through a landmark agreement which secured Port Harcourt as host city for the 12th Africa Movie Academy Awards. She has been criticized for not doing enough for the Entertainment industry in Rivers State, with some quarters calling for her resignation. She was suspended by the governor of the state on 31 August 2016.

== See also ==
- List of people from Rivers State
- Rivers State Tourism Development Agency
