= Emmanuel C. Aguma =

Nigerian politician and lawyer (died 2018)

Attorney General and Commissioner for Justice of Rivers State

Senior Advocate of Nigeria
- In office 2015–2018
- Governor: Nyesom Wike

Personal details
- Born: Emmanuel Chinwenwo Aguma; April 21, 1961 Rivers State, Nigeria
- Died: August 10, 2018 (aged 57) London, England
- Occupation: Lawyer, politician
- Profession: Lawyer

Emmanuel Chinwenwo Aguma (died 10 August 2018) was a Nigerian politician and lawyer from Rivers State, a long-term member People's Democratic Party. He was the Attorney General and Commissioner of Justice in the state. Between 2000 and 2002 Aguma worked as Secretary of the Nigerian Bar Association, Port Harcourt Branch, and also chaired the Bar from 2006 to 2008. On 10 July 2015, the Legal Practitioners Privileges Committee conferred the rank of Senior Advocate of Nigeria (SAN) on him alongside 20 others, to be sworn in on 21 September 2015.

== Early life and education ==
Emmanuel Chinwenwo Aguma was born on 21 April 1961 to Chief Sir Emmanuel W. Aguma, a former Federal Minister, and Dame Hannah Aguma. He attended Santa Maria Primary School, Port Harcourt, St. Paul's Primary School, Diobu, Government Comprehensive Secondary School, Port Harcourt, and County Grammar School, Ikwerre/Etche. He later completed his Advanced Level studies at Federal Government College, Port Harcourt, and St Aldgate's College, Oxford. Aguma earned a Bachelor of Arts in Politics and International Studies from the University of Warwick and an LL.B from the University of Sheffield, before attending the Nigerian Law School, where he qualified as a barrister.

== Career ==
Aguma began his legal career as General Counsel to Gemmex Nigeria Limited during his National Youth Service Corps. He later worked as Legal Counsel at N. Nwanodi & Co. from 1989 to 1996 before founding Aguma & Co. In 2015, he was conferred with the rank of Senior Advocate of Nigeria (SAN) and was appointed Attorney General and Commissioner for Justice of Rivers State, serving until his death in 2018.

== Political career ==
Aguma was a member of the People's Democratic Party (PDP) and served as the party's pioneer Head of Legal, Strategy and Planning in Rivers State. He also served as Secretary of the Nigerian Bar Association, Port Harcourt Branch, from 2000 to 2002 and as Chairman from 2006 to 2008. In 2015, he was appointed Attorney General and Commissioner for Justice of Rivers State, serving until his death in 2018.

== Legacy ==
Aguma served in leadership positions within the Nigerian Bar Association, Port Harcourt Branch, and later as Attorney General and Commissioner for Justice of Rivers State. Following his death in 2018, members of the legal profession and public officials paid tribute to his contributions to the legal profession and public service.

== Personal life ==
Aguma was married to Chinwe Aguma, and they had children. He was also involved in mentoring young lawyers through the Nigerian Bar Association.

== Death ==
Aguma died on 10 August 2018 at the age of 57 after a brief illness.

== See also ==
- List of people from Rivers State
- Judiciary of Rivers State
