= Rivers State Ministry of Environment =

Ministry overview
- Formed: 2003
- Jurisdiction: Government of Rivers State
- Headquarters: 1st Floor, State Secretariat; Port Harcourt, Rivers State, Nigeria; 4°46′24″N 7°0′57″E
- Ministry executives: Dr Igbiks Tamuno, Commissioner; Dr Nduye Christy Tobins Briggs, Permanent Secretary

The Rivers State Ministry of Environment (RSMENV) is a ministry of the Government of Rivers State established in 2003 to deal with matters relating to the environment. Its functions include formulating, implementing and reviewing of policies on the state's environmental/ecological programs and projects. The mission is generally targeted to ensure a clean and safe environment. The ministry currently has its headquarters at 1st Floor, State Secretariat, Port Harcourt.

== Vision ==
To cause a systematic environmental remediation through transparent pursuit of sectoral green policies, public engagement and equitable enforcement of environmental legislations.

== Mission ==
To establish acceptable environmental standards, policies and programmes that will enhance and promote a green economy in a healthy and sustainable state.

== Departments ==
The Rivers State Ministry of Environment currently has 9 departments. Each department has unique functions it performs.

- Administration
- Flood and Erosion and Coastal Zone Managements
- Environment Planning, Research and Statistics
- Environmental Health and Safety
- Claims, Compensations and Relief
- Inspectorate and Enforcement
- Pollution Control
- Finance and Accounts
- Internal Audit Unit

== List of commissioners ==
- Nyema E. Weli
- Engr. Victor Kii
- Dr Chisom Kenneth Gbali
- Collins onunwo
- Prince Charles E. O. Beke
- Solomon Abel Eke

== See also ==
- Government of Rivers State
- Government ministries of Rivers State
