= Nyesom Wike =

Nigerian politician and lawyer (born 1967)

Nyesom Wike CON

Minister of the Federal Capital Territory
- Incumbent
- Assumed office 21 August 2023
- President: Bola Tinubu
- Minister of State: Mariya Mahmoud Bunkure
- Preceded by: Mohammed Musa Bello

16th Governor of Rivers State
- In office 29 May 2015 – 29 May 2023
- Deputy: Ipalibo Banigo
- Preceded by: Rotimi Amaechi
- Succeeded by: Siminalayi Fubara

Minister of Education
- Acting
- In office 11 September 2013 – April 2014
- President: Goodluck Jonathan
- Preceded by: Ruqayyah Ahmed Rufa'i
- Succeeded by: Ibrahim Shekarau

Minister of State for Education
- In office 14 July 2011 – April 2014
- President: Goodluck Jonathan
- Minister: Ruqayyah Ahmed Rufa'i
- Succeeded by: Viola Onwuliri

Chief of Staff to the Governor of Rivers State
- In office 2007–2011
- Governor: Rotimi Amaechi

Chairman of Obio-Akpor Local Government
- In office 1999–2007

Personal details
- Born: 13 December 1967 (age 58) Obio-Akpor, Rivers State, Nigeria
- Party: People's Democratic Party
- Spouse: Eberechi Wike
- Children: 3
- Education: Master of Arts degree in Political and Administrative Studies
- Alma mater: Rivers State University of Science and Technology (LL.B.)
- Occupation: Politician; lawyer

Ezenwo Nyesom Wike CON (born 13 December 1967) is a Nigerian politician and lawyer who has served as the minister of the Federal Capital Territory since 2023. He previously served as the governor of Rivers State from 2015 to 2023. He is also considered a champion of infrastructural development or nicknamed "Mr Project".

An ethnic Ikwerre from Rumuepirikom in Obio-Akpor, in Southern Nigeria, he is a member of the Peoples Democratic Party and a graduate of the Rivers State University of Science and Technology.

Wike was elected as a two-term Executive Chairman of Obio Akpor Local Government Area from 1999 to 2007. He was appointed Minister of State for Education on 14 July 2011. Wike was later appointed the Acting Minister of Education, after Ruqayyah Ahmed Rufa'i was sacked but resigned before finishing his term to campaign for governor of Rivers State. He was replaced by Viola Onwuliri. In 2014, he won the Rivers State Peoples Democratic Party primaries and chose former Secretary to the State Government Ipalibo Banigo as his running mate for deputy governor.

Wike defeated Dakuku Peterside of the All Progressives Congress (APC) and Tonye Princewill of the Labour Party in the 11 April gubernatorial elections to emerge as governor.

In March 2022, Wike declared that he will be running for the office of the president of Nigeria under the platform of the Peoples Democratic Party (PDP) ahead of the 2023 General election, he was defeated by Atiku Abubakar who won the primaries with 371 votes while Wike got 237 votes being the first runner up, during the Peoples Democratic Party presidential election primary which was held at the MKO Abiola National stadium, Abuja on 28 and 29 May 2022.The fallout from the primary election created animosity between Wike and Atiku, he worked against the PDP in the election and on October 20, 2024 he told Atiku to pack up and go home.

President Bola Tinubu appointed Wike as minister of the FCT on 16 August 2023, following his nomination, screening and approval by the senate.

== Education ==
Wike attended Government Secondary School Eneka in Obiakpor, Rivers State where he sat for his O'level exams before proceeding to the Rivers State University of Science and Technology (RSUT). He obtained a Bachelor of Laws degree from RSUT before proceeding to Law School in 1997. Wike holds a Master of Arts degree in Political and Administrative Studies from RSUT.

In March 2025, Wike was awarded an honorary doctorate degree in Law by the University of Calabar, during the 37th convocation ceremony.

== Political career ==
Wike began his political career as the Executive Chairman of Obio Akpor Local Government Area in Rivers in 1999, a position he held until 2007, after being re-elected in 2003. In 2007, he was appointed as the chief of staff to the governor of Rivers State, Rotimi Amaechi.

In July 2011, he was appointed as the Minister of State for Education by President Goodluck Jonathan and was promoted to Federal Minister of Education in September 2013. He stepped down as Federal Minister to contest in the 2015 gubernatorial elections in his home state, Rivers State.

=== Rivers State election petition tribunal ===
On 13 May 2015, the election tribunal for Rivers State, sitting in Abuja, commenced the hearing on the election of Wike.

Dr Dakuku Peterside of the APC was asking the tribunal to nullify the election of Nyesom Wike of the PDP who was declared winner as governor in the poll held on 11 April 2015, on the grounds that it was fraught with malpractices and non-compliance with the provisions of the Electoral Act.

Wike opposed the hearing of the case in Abuja, arguing that the tribunal should be held in Port Harcourt. But the then President of the Court of Appeal, Justice Zainab Bulkachawa, rejected Wike's arguments and ordered that the tribunal be held in Abuja, for reason of security. Justice Zainab also ordered that, besides Rivers, all election petition tribunals for Adamawa, Borno and Yobe be held in the Nigerian capital, Abuja.

After failing to serve Wike with court summons, presiding Justice Muazu Pindiga approved the request by Rotimi Akeredolu, the counsel to Dr Dakuku Peterside of the All Progressives Congress, to grant an order for substituted service on the governor-elect because Wike had been evading service of court summon and other processes in the petition challenging Wike's elections. Akeredolu stated that the court bailiffs had on several occasions visited Wike's residence to effect court service on him but was on all the occasions turned back at the gate by Wike's security guards upon discovery that he was a court bailiff.

Ruling on the petitioner's counsel's motion, Justice Pindiga, who granted the prayers, ordered that the court processes should be pasted on the wall of Wike's house. He said that "I have gone through the motion ex-parte and it is hereby granted; all the court processes are deemed valid." Justice Pindiga then ordered that substituted service be effected against Wike either by pasting the court process on Wike's house or at the office of the PDP secretariat in Rivers state or in Abuja.

The Rivers State governorship election tribunal nullified the election of Wike on 24 October 2015. The election tribunal ordered governorship election rerun in Rivers State within 90 days immediately after the day of judgment. Wike said he would appeal the ruling of the tribunal.

=== Discrepancy in the accredited votes in the Rivers elections for Wike ===
The election tribunal was informed that the Independent National Electoral Commission in Rivers awarded Wike votes almost five times higher than the actual, authentic total number of voters accredited with card readers and Permanent Voter Cards which was 292,878, which was the total number of accredited voters for 11 April 2015, gubernatorial election in Rivers. The result was declared by the Returning Officer for Rivers State, Osasere Orumwense on 13 April 2015, stating that Wike was awarded 1,029,102 votes, thus winning the election.

However document was signed by Ibrahim Bawa, the acting director in charge of INEC Legal Unit and Abimbola Oladunjoye, head of unit, Data Management, of the commission's Information and Communication Technology Department. According to the result declared by the Returning Officer for Rivers State, Osasere Orumwense on 13 April, Wike was awarded 1,029,102 votes, representing 87.77 per cent of 1,228,614, being the conjured number of total accredited voters. However, the tribunal was informed that according to INEC documents, tendered as court evidence, the total number of accredited voters in Rivers was only 292,878. It was also common knowledge, however, that there was widespread malfunction of Card Readers on the Election Day prompting the extension of the election to the next day and granting recourse to the use of manual accreditation without the faulty card readers.

The commission's central server captured all actual validated and authenticated votes for the Rivers State elections on 11 April 2015, making fraud by manual accreditation impossible.

In that election, only those votes captured by the central servers from the PVC-SCR are deemed accredited and valid; manual accreditation is not allowed for governorship elections. The Court of Appeal has however ruled in the case of Agbaje vs Ambode that the non use of card readers is not a ground to nullify an election. The River State governorship election tribunal nullified the election of Wike on 24 October 2015. The election tribunal ordered governorship election rerun in Rivers State within 90 days immediately after the day of judgment generating uproar within the country as to alleged partisanship and corruption within the judiciary.

=== 2019 gubernatorial re-election ===
The INEC declared Wike the winner of Rivers State governorship polls on Wednesday, 3 April 2019, after suspending the process for some days. Wike took his oath of office on Wednesday, 29 May 2019 at Yakubu Gowon Stadium, Port Harcourt as he commenced his second term. In his address, he promised to put Rivers State first.

In May 2022, he contested for the Peoples Democratic Party presidential ticket but lost to Atiku Abubakar. He also supported Sim Fubara as the PDP governorship candidate in Rivers state.

=== Ministerial nomination by President Tinubu ===
On 27 July 2023, President Bola Ahmed Tinubu sent Wike's name, along with 27 others, to the 10th Nigerian Senate as ministerial nominees. On 31 July 2023, Wike was screened by the senate where he declared that President Tinubu would not regret nominating him as a minister in his cabinet. He is now the current Minister of the FCT.

== Reforms ==
In line with his plans for educational reform, Nyesom Wike declared public primary and secondary education free. He disclosed this on Monday, 24 June 2019, in a meeting at the government house, Port Harcourt. This was joined with complaints and appreciation; The latter from parents and former Principals and headmasters in the state. However, the Government of Wike held its ground amidst the perpetual demur until they all dissolved.

In 2019, Wike through the State Ministry of Education announced free registration for participating locals of the state in the annual JAMB examination.

In 2022, he signed a measure into law that strengthens a women's right to inherit property. Upon signing the bill, he encouraged women to claim what is theirs and said they should not be afraid to do so because it is their legal right.

== Projects ==
During his second term as a governor, he kicked-off the construction of three major flyovers simultaneously in Port Harcourt. The location of the flyovers are at Garrison, Rumoukoro and Artillery.

== Controversies ==
Having had a disagreement with his party's candidate (PDP)(Atiku) in the 2023 presidential election, Wike was appointed Minister of the Fct under the Tinubu's administration (APC).

During his term as a governor of Rivers State and his term as FCT minister, Wike enforced the legal payment of ground rent in the Fct therefore frequently clashing with individuals and institutions who refused to abide by the law. This often required sealing up residential buildings and office complex .

There were reports of two hotels demolished in Rivers, purportedly on Wike's orders, for the alleged offence of operating in violation of COVID lockdown.

Wike also has a continuing feud with his protege and successor Rivers State Governor, Sim Fubara, that has included insults, lawsuits and even halt in all federal payments to Rivers on Wike's behest.

== See also ==
- List of governors of Rivers State

Party political offices
Preceded by Rotimi Amaechi	PDP nominee for Governor of Rivers State; 2015, 2019	Succeeded by Siminalayi Fubara
Political offices
Preceded by Rotimi Amaechi	Governor of Rivers State; 2015–2023	Incumbent
