= List of people from Rivers State =

The following is a list of notable people who were born in Rivers State, lived in Rivers State, or for whom Rivers State is a significant part of their identity.

== A ==
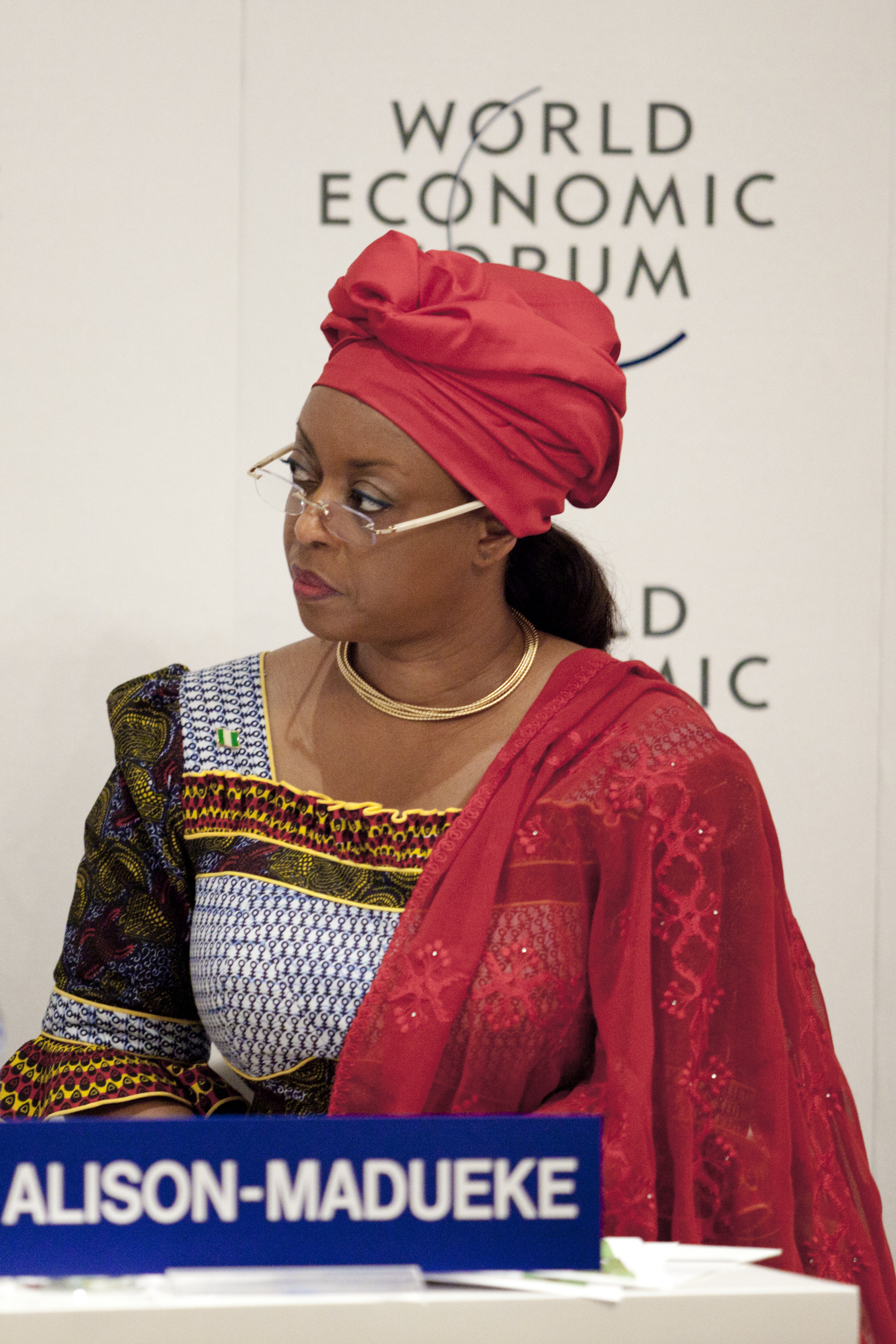
Diezani Alison-Madueke

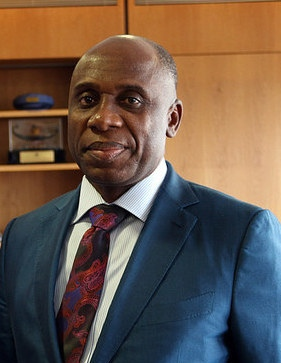
Chibuike Amaechi

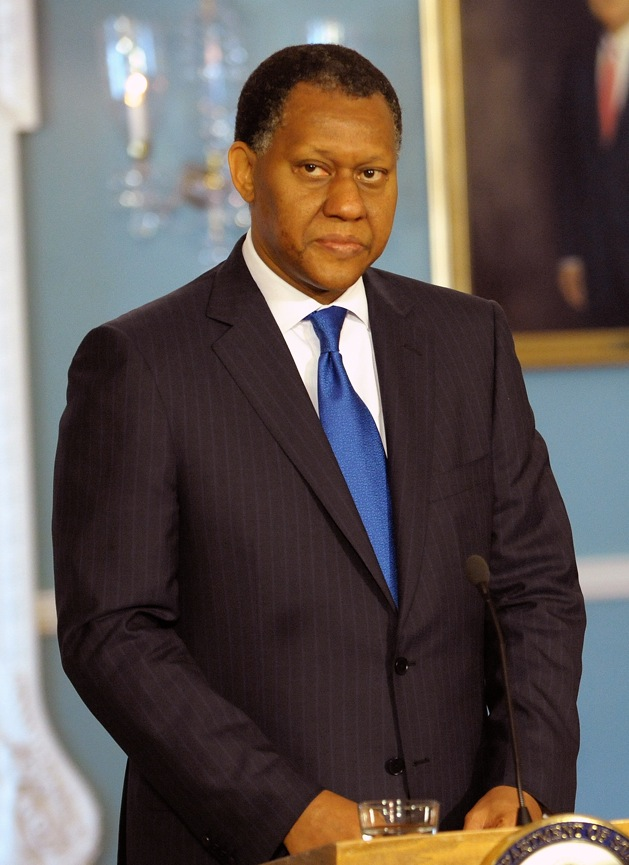
Henry Ajumogobia

- George Abbey (born 1978), soccer player
- Magnus Ngei Abe (born 1965), lawyer and senator of the Federal Republic (2015–2019)
- Zacchaeus Adangor, Attorney General of Rivers State
- Echendu Adiele (1978–2011), soccer player
- Emmanuel C. Aguma, former attorney general of Rivers State (2015v2019)
- Friday Ahunanya (born 1971), world heavyweight champion and boxer
- Joseph Ajienka (born 1955), Vice-Chancellor of the University of Port Harcourt
- Henry Ajumogobia (born 1956), Attorney General, Commissioner of Justice
- Claude Ake (1939–1996), political scientist
- Godspower Ake (1940–2016), legislator
- Wilson Asinobi Ake (born 1955), Nigerian Senator from Rivers State
- Mercy Akide (born 1975), former soccer player
- Diezani Alison-Madueke (born 1960), former minister of Petroleum Resources (2010–2015), Mines and Steel (2008–2010) and Transport (2007–2008)
- Mactabene Amachree (born 1978), basketball player
- Otelemaba Amachree (born 1963), former Speaker of the Rivers State House of Assembly, and Group Chairman of Big Ross Int’l. LTD
- Elechi Amadi (1934–2016), author, speaker
- Okey Amadi, MHA
- Chibuike Amaechi (born 1965), Governor of Rivers State
- Thankgod Amaefule (born 1984), soccer player
- Martins Amaewhule, speaker, Rivers State House of Assembly
- Chika Amalaha (born 1997), weightlifter
- Betty Apiafi (born 1962), economist, retired banker, school teacher
- Pere Ariweriyai (born 1983), soccer player
- Napoleon Ashley-Lassen (born 1934), Chief of the Defence Staff of the Ghana Armed Forces
- Tamunosiki Atorudibo (born 1985), athlete
- Izu Azuka (born 1989), soccer player

== B ==
- Ipalibo Banigo (born 1952), medical doctor; first female senator and Deputy Governor of Rivers State
- Herbert Bankole-Bright (1883–1958), politician
- Innocent Barikor, academic and politician
- A. Igoni Barrett (born 1979), writer
- John Bazia, politician
- Bella Bell-Gam (born 1956), pentathlete
- Ngeri Benebo (born 1955), medical doctor
- Amaopusenibo Siminalayi "Sim" Joseph Black-Fubara (born 1979), Executive Governor, Rivers State
- Andre Blaze (born 1983), rapper, reality talent show host
- Worgu Boms (born 1968), Commissioner of Justice
- Ann-Kio Briggs (born 1952), activist
- Nimi Briggs (born 1944), Vice-Chancellor of the University of Port Harcourt
- Roseberry Briggs (1925–2013), Speaker of the Rivers State House of Assembly
- Tonye Briggs-Oniyide, Rivers State Commissioner of Culture and Tourism

== C ==
Mercy Chinwo

- Sokari Douglas Camp (born 1958), artist
- Michael O. Chinda, Member of the House of Assembly
- Monalisa Chinda (born 1974), actress
- Mercy Chinwo, singer, actress
- Tonye Cole (born 1967), businessman
- Andrea Cossu (born 1984), soccer player
- Noah Arthur William Cox-George (1915–2004), economist and academic

== D ==
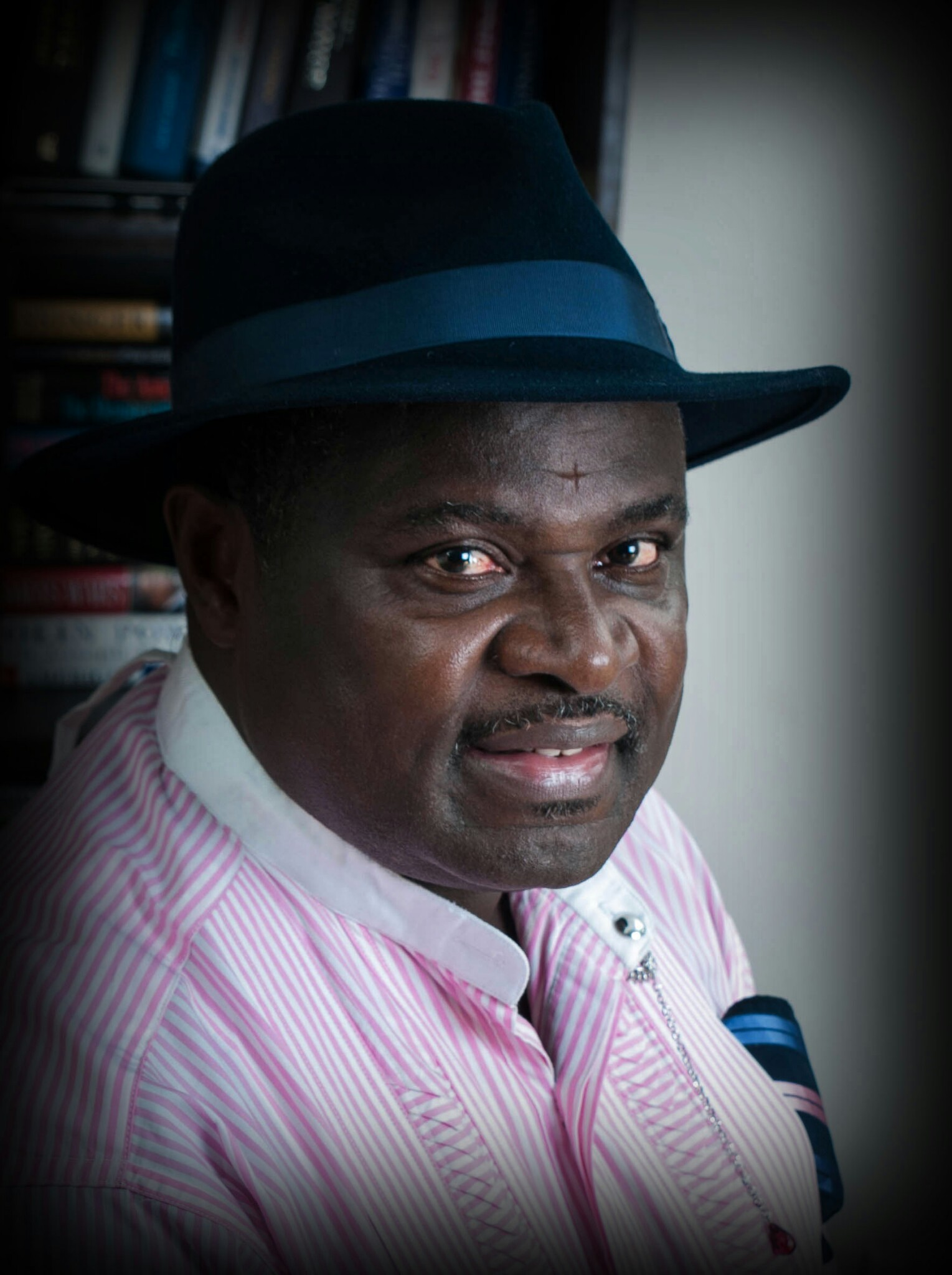
Reynolds Dagogo-Jack

- Adams Dabotorudima, Speaker of the Rivers State House of Assembly
- Diminas Dagogo, film director
- Reynolds Bekinbo Dagogo-Jack (born 1957), politician
- Samuel Dagogo-Jack (born 1954), medical doctor,
- Sumner Dagogo-Jack (born 1930), civil servant
- Harold Dappa-Biriye (born 1920), politician
- Agbani Darego (born 1982), first black woman from Africa to win Miss World
- George Datoru (born 1978), soccer player
- Tam David-West (1936–2019), academic and former federal minister
- Sam Dede, actor and politician
- Blessing Didia, medical doctor
- Tonto Dikeh (born 1985), actress and singer
- Duncan Dokiwari (born 1973), boxer
- Hilda Dokubo, actress
- Eddy Lord Dombraye (born 1979), soccer player

== E ==
- Kaniye Ebeku (born 1961), Commissioner for Education, lawyer
- Ngozi Ebere (born 1991), soccer player
- Emmanuel Ebiede (born 1978), soccer player
- Frank Eke (1931–2013), Deputy Governor of Rivers State
- Obinna Ekezie (born 1975), basketball player
- Boniface S. Emerengwa, lawyer
- Tamara Eteimo (born 1987), actress and singer
- Sam Sam Etetegwung, politician and lawmaker
- Dino Eze (born 1984), soccer player
- Victor Ezeji (born 1981), soccer player
- Sandra Ezekwesili (born 1989), radio personality
- Chinedu Ezimora (born 1985), soccer player

== F ==
- Ibinabo Fiberesima (born 1973), actress
- Tam Fiofori (born 1942), writer, photographer
- Samuel Francis (born 1987), athlete
- Iyenemi Furo (born 1978), soccer player

== G ==
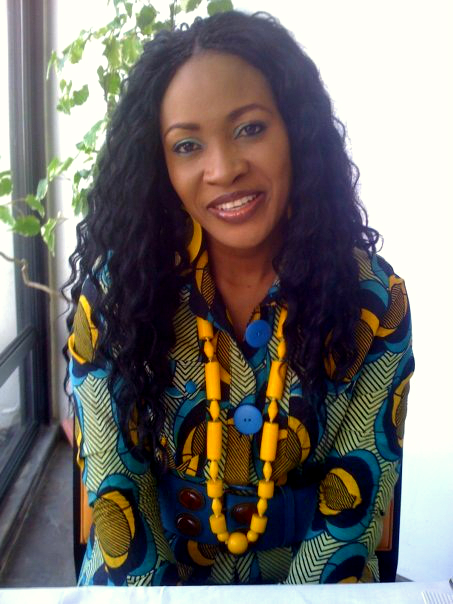
Muma Gee

- Muma Gee (born 1978), singer and actress
- Finidi George (born 1971), retired soccer player
- Odeni George (born 1995), soccer player
- Rose A. George (1946–2010), First Lady of Rivers State
- Rufus Ada George (born 1940), Governor of Rivers State
- Manuela George-Izunwa (born 1974), co-senior pastor of Gateway Church, lawyer, former commissioner of women affa5irs, Rivers State
- Alabo George Kelly, politician and surveyor
- Rufus Godwins, lawyer and civil servant
- Alabo Graham-Douglas (born 1939), Senior Advocate of Nigeria
- Bikiya Graham-Douglas (born 1983), actress and businesswoman
- Damiete Charles Granville (born 1988), model
- J. A. Green (1873–1905), photographer
- Rosemund Dienye Green-Osahogulu (born 1956), vice-chancellor of Ignatius Ajuru University of Education

== H ==
- Princess Halliday, television personality
- Kelsey Harrison (born 1934), Vice-Chancellor of the University of Port Harcourt
- Marshal Sokari Harry, politician
- Albert Horsfall (born 1941), former security chief
- Herbert Onyewumbu Wigwe, (15 August 1966 – 9 February 2024), former Access Bank CEO

== I ==
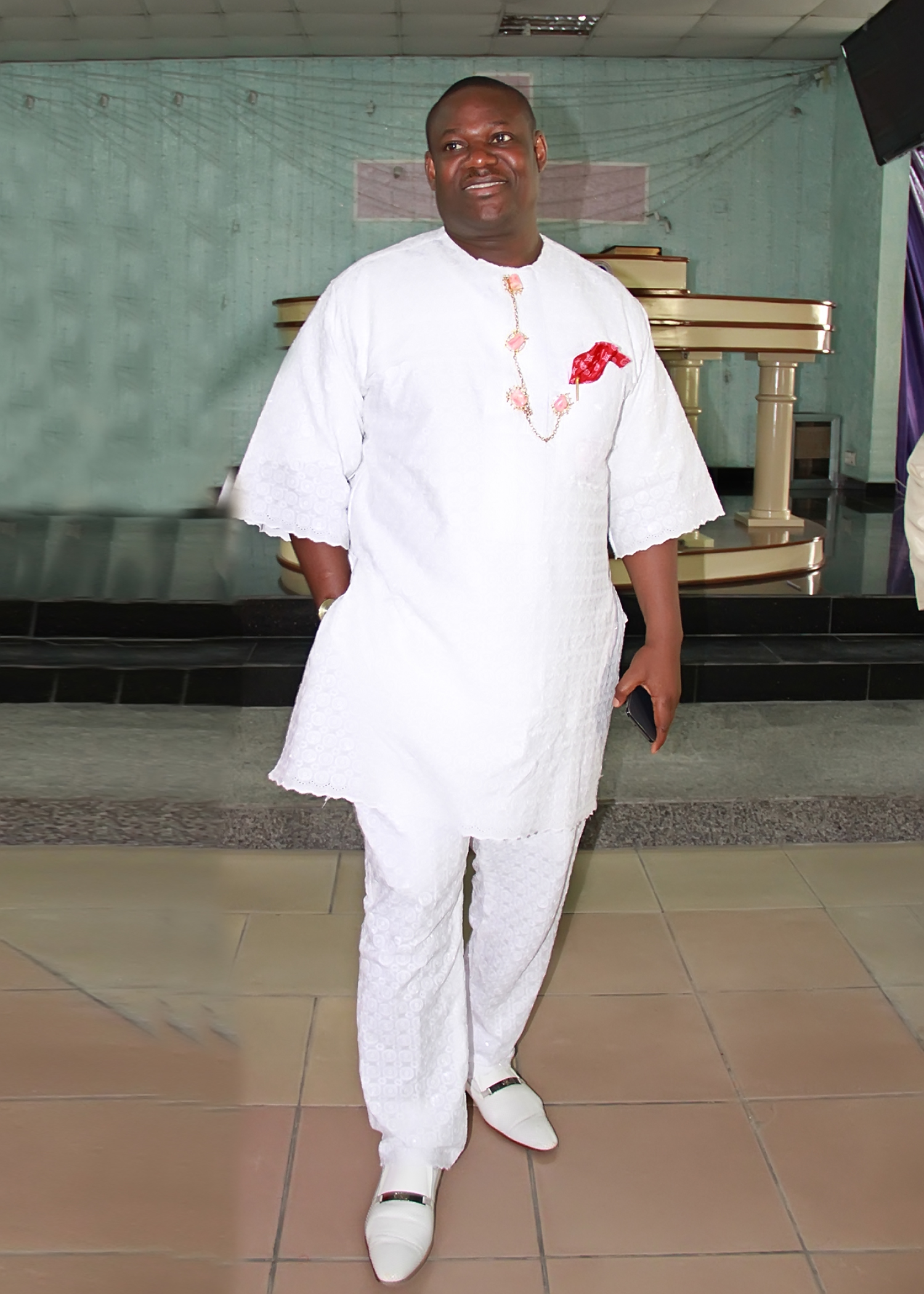
Tele Ikuru

- Lady IB, singer
- Ikuinyi O. Ibani, Speaker of the Rivers State House of Assembly
- Christian Ibeagha (born 1990), soccer player
- John Ibeh (born 1986), soccer player
- Tonye Ibiama (born 1974), businessman
- Bernie Ibini-Isei (born 1992), soccer player
- David Ibiyeomie (born 1962), founder of Salvation Ministries
- Osinakachukwu Ideozu (born 1965), estate surveyor, senator
- Catherine Uju Ifejika (born 1959), lawyer
- Chinyere Igwe (born 1965), politician
- Faith Ikidi (born 1987), soccer player
- John Ikuru (1877–1947), Okama of Ikuru Town, Andoni
- Tele Ikuru (born 1966), Deputy Governor of Rivers State
- Manasseh Ishiaku (born 1983), soccer player

== J ==
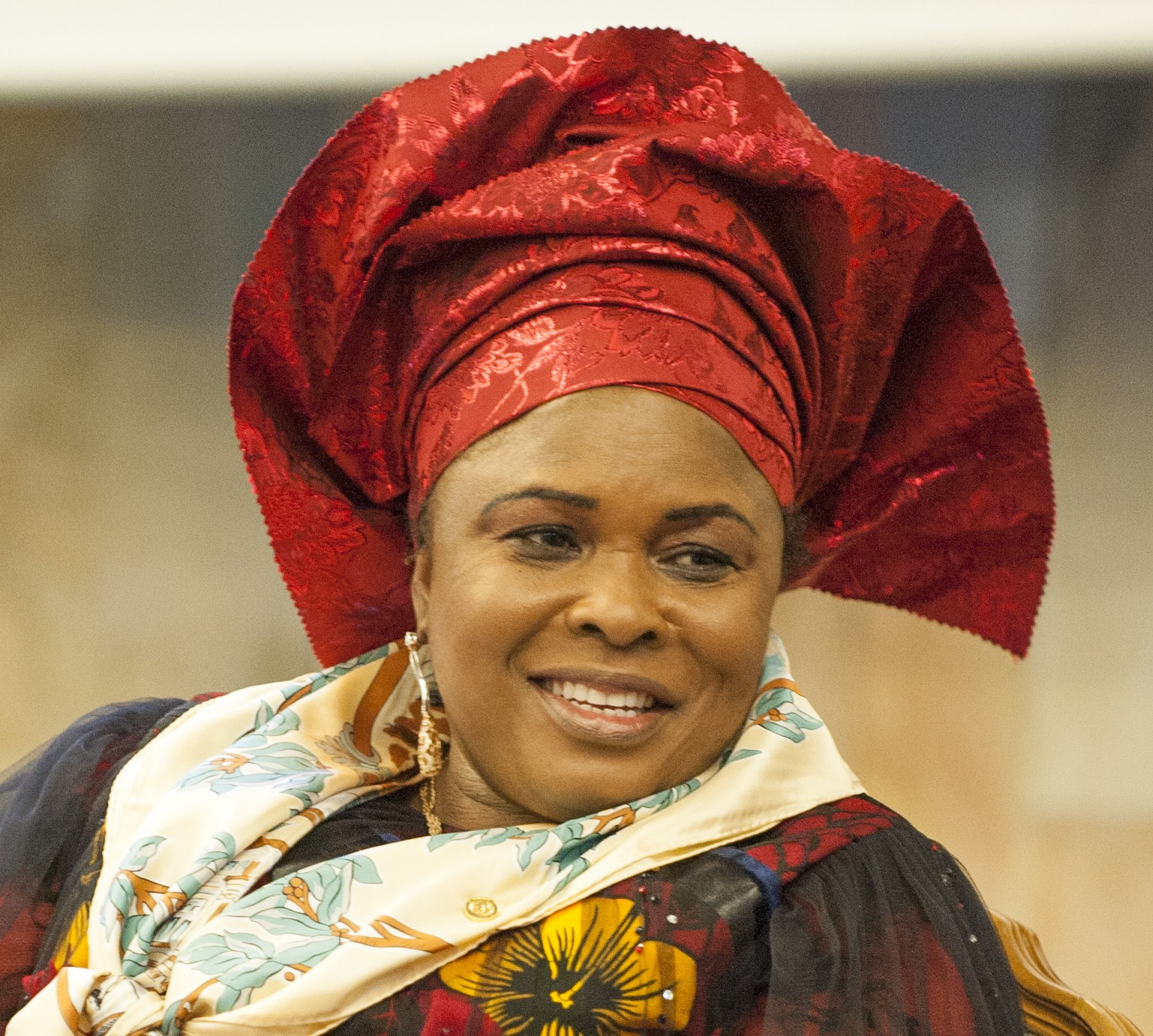
Patience Jonathan

- Isobo Jack, nightclub owner
- Major Jack, engineer, leader of the Rivers State House of Assembly
- Onimim Jacks (born 1961), lawyer
- Tamunosisi Gogo Jaja, lawmaker
- Nasigba John-Jumbo (born 1988), soccer player
- Patience Jonathan (born 1957), First Lady of Nigeria
- Oko Jumbo, King of Bonny

== K ==
- Isaac Kamalu, Commissioner of Finance, legal practitioner
- Ignatius Kattey (born 1948), Archbishop, Dean Emeritus, Church of Nigeria
- Kenneth Kobani, Minister of State, Industry, Trade and Investment
- Roseline Konya, professor
- Fred Kpakol, chairman of Gokana Local Government Council
- Magnus L. Kpakol (born 1934), former chief economic adviser to Nigerian president Jonathan
- George T. Kurubo (1934–2000), former ambassador to Soviet Union

== L ==
- Ndowa N Lale, academic and publisher
- Obafemi Lasode (born 1955), actor
- Rex Lawson (1935–1971), musician
- Omah Lay, musician
- Olu Benson Lulu-Briggs (1930–2018), Nigerian statesman and businessman
- Sam Ledor (born 1986), soccer player
- Lyrikal (born 1983), rapper

== M ==
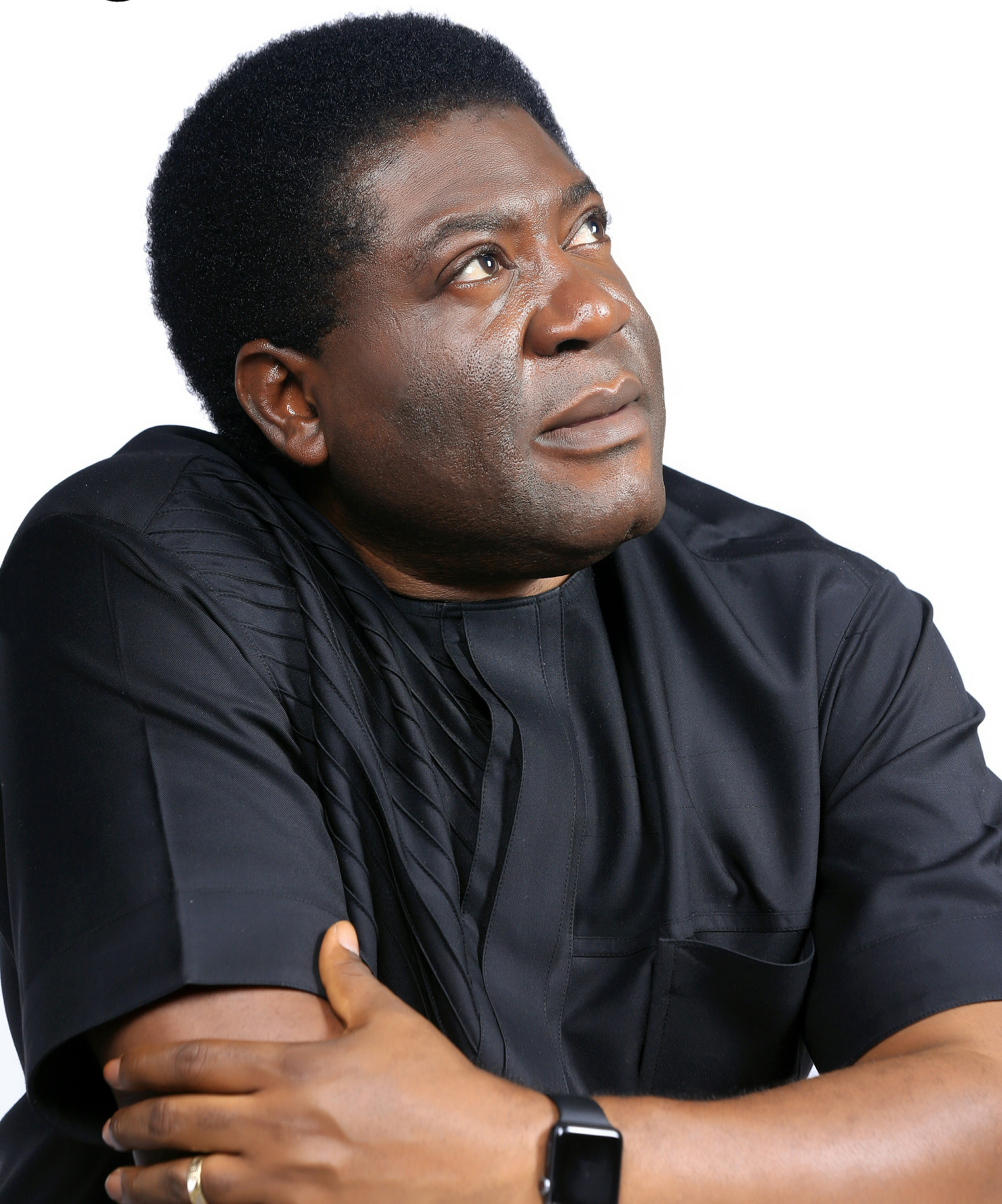
Prince Eze Madumere

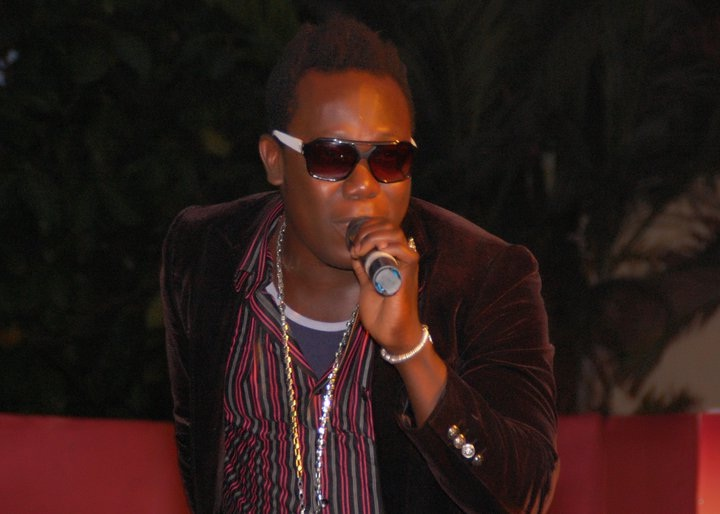
Duncan Mighty

- M-Trill (born 1979), rapper
- Davis Mac-Iyalla (born 1972), activist
- Chiamaka Madu (born 1996), soccer player
- Prince Eze Madumere (born 1964), former Deputy Governor, Imo State
- Lee Ledogo Maeba (born 1966), politician
- Martyns Mannah (born 1975), member of the House of Assembly
- Rosemary Marcus, cyclist
- Ibiapuye Martyns-Yellowe (born 1945), politician
- Maud Meyer, jazz singer
- Duncan Wene Mighty (born 1983), musician
- Kenneth Minimah (born 1959), Chief of Army Staff
- Oliver Mobisson (1943–2010), activist
- Barry Mpigi (born 1961), Senator Rivers East

== N ==
- Ozo-Mekuri Ndimele (born 1963), academic
- Otonti Amadi Nduka (born 1926), dean of education at the University of Port Harcourt
- Jerry Needam (born 1966), journalist, newspaper publisher and politician
- Martin Newland (born 1961), journalist and executive director
- Peter Nieketien (born 1968), former soccer player
- Chimaroke Nnamani (born 1960), politician
- Ike Nwachukwu (born 1940), politician
- Chidi Nwanu (born 1967), soccer player
- Olaka Nwogu (born 1965), retired civil servant, and senator
- David Nwolokor (born 1996), soccer player
- Chibudom Nwuche, politician
- Ogbonna Nwuke (born 1959), journalist
- Benji Nzeakor (born 1964), retired soccer player

== O ==
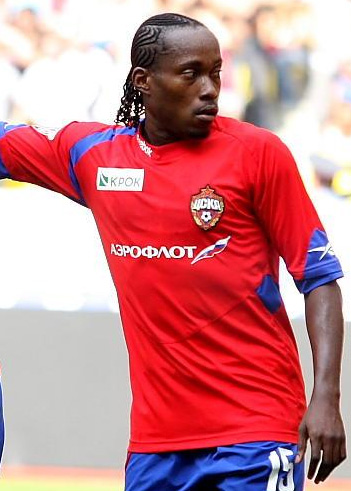
Chidi Odiah

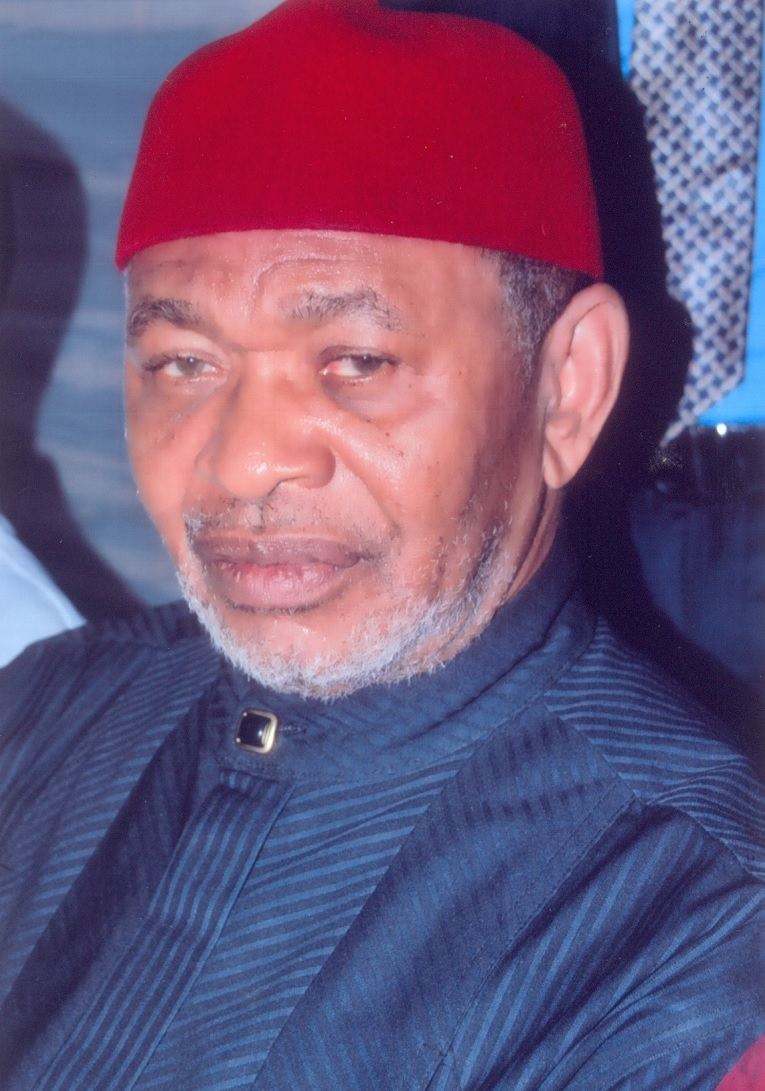
Walter Ofonagoro

- Philip Obele (born 1958), king of Eleme
- Saint Obi (1965–2023), actor
- Felix A. Obuah, businessman and politician
- Chidi Odiah (born 1983), soccer player
- Glory Odiase (born 1993), cyclist
- Mary Odili (born 1952), former First Lady of Rivers State, and Justice of the Supreme Court (retired)
- Peter Odili (born 1948), Governor of Rivers State doctor, founder of Pamo University of Health Sciences
- Walter Ofonagoro (born 1940), scholar, businessman
- King Otuo Ogbalakon (1772–1846), Andoni warrior king
- Clem Ohameze (born 1965), actor
- Emmanuel Okah, lawyer
- Daisy W. Okocha (born 1951), former Justice of the Rivers State High Court
- Agnes Okoh, founder of Christ Holy Church International
- Otonyetarie Okoye, civil servant
- Chinelo Okparanta (born 1981), writer
- Aaron Samuel Olanare (born 1994), soccer player
- Celestine Omehia (born 1959), Governor of Rivers State
- Emeka Onowu (born 1984), political leader
- Jimitota Onoyume, journalist
- Elkanah Onyeali (1939–2008), soccer player
- Daniel Onyekachi (born 1985), soccer player
- Austin Opara (born 1963), member of the House of Representatives
- Yvonne Orji (born 1983), actress
- Kelechi Osunwa (born 1984), soccer player
- Felicity Okpete Ovai (born 1961), engineer
- Frank Owhor (born 1958), Attorney General of Rivers State, Federal Commissioner for RMAFC
- Richard Daddy Owubokiri (born 1961), retired soccer player
- Ukel Oyaghiri (born 1964), lawyer, politician
- Boma Ozobia, lawyer

== P ==
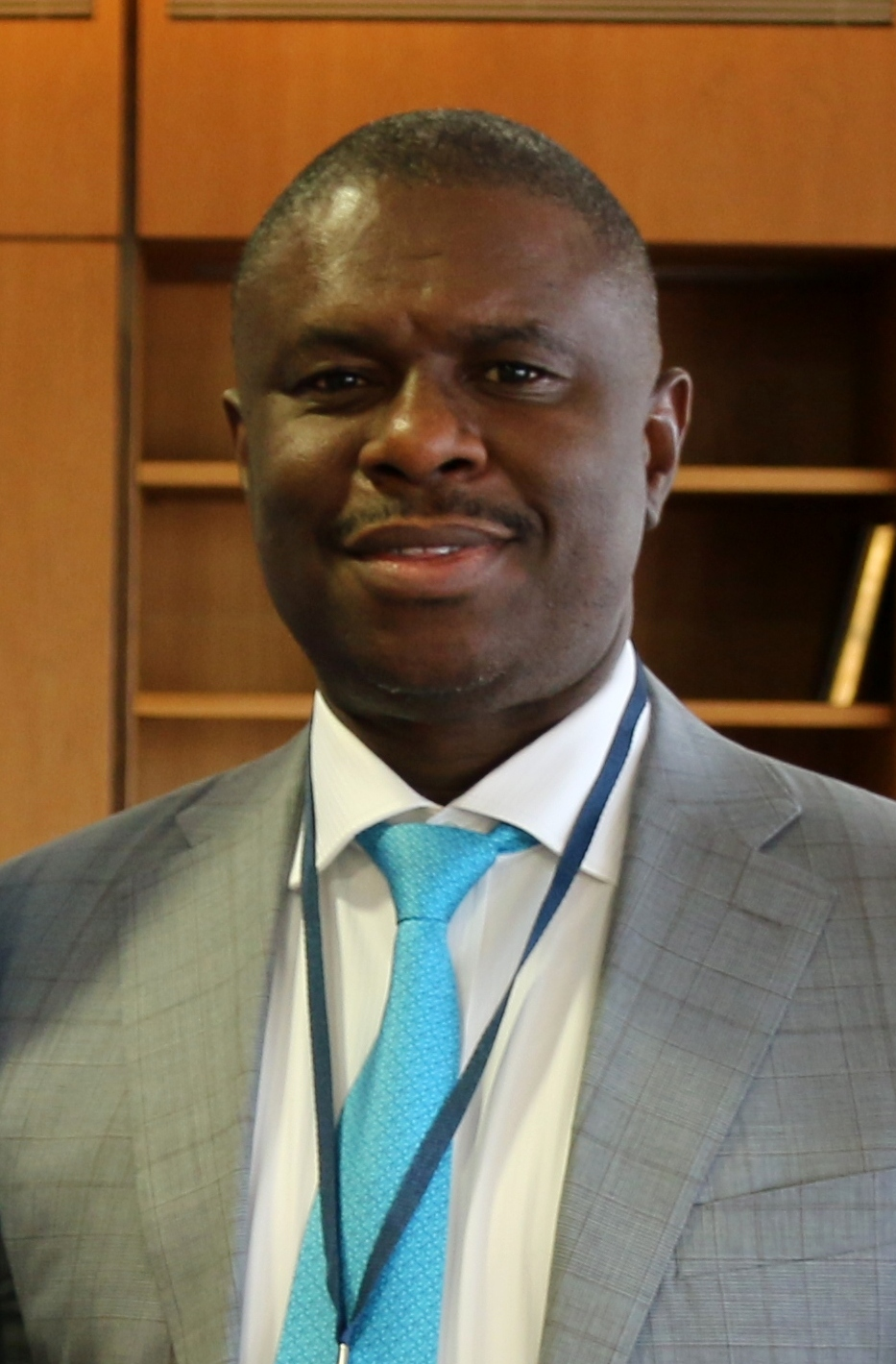
Dakuku Peterside

- Adawari Pepple, politician
- George Oruigbiji Pepple (1849–1888), King of Bonny
- Atedo Peterside (born 1955), entrepreneur, investment banker, and economist,
- Dakuku Peterside (born 1970), businessman, former DG of NIMASA
- Tonye Princewill (born 1969), businessman and politician

== S ==
- Ken Saro-Wiwa (1941–1995), writer and activist
- Zina Saro-Wiwa (born 1976), video artist and filmmaker
- Uche Secondus (born 1955), businessman, political figure
- George Thompson Sekibo (born 1957), Nigerian senator from Rivers State
- Precious Sekibo (born 1958), doctor and politician
- Jesse Sekidika (born 1996), soccer player
- Uchechi Sunday (born 1994), soccer player

== T ==
- Marco Tagbajumi (born 1988), soccer player
- Austin Tam-George, communication and industrial relations specialist
- Tekena Tamuno (1932–2015), historian
- Cleopatra Tawo, radio personality
- Odagme Theophilus (born 1974), medical doctor
- Elsie Nwanwuri Thompson, lawyer
- Timaya (born 1977), singer
- Gabriel Toby, Deputy Governor of Rivers State
- Nwankwo Tochukwu (born 1986), soccer player
- Hector Tubonemi (born 1988), soccer player

== U ==
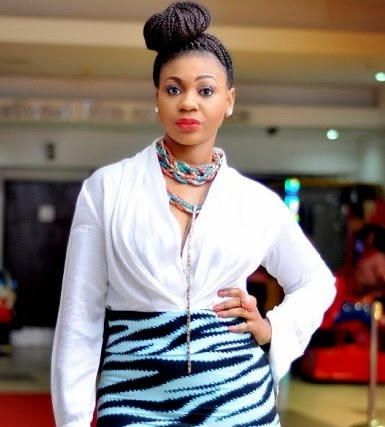
Mary Uranta

- Andrew Uchendu, federal lawmaker
- Colin Udoh, journalist and sports television presenter
- Innocent Umezulike (1953–2018), judge
- Mary Uranta, actress and businesswoman
- Marshall Stanley Uwom (born 1965), lawyer and businessman

== W ==
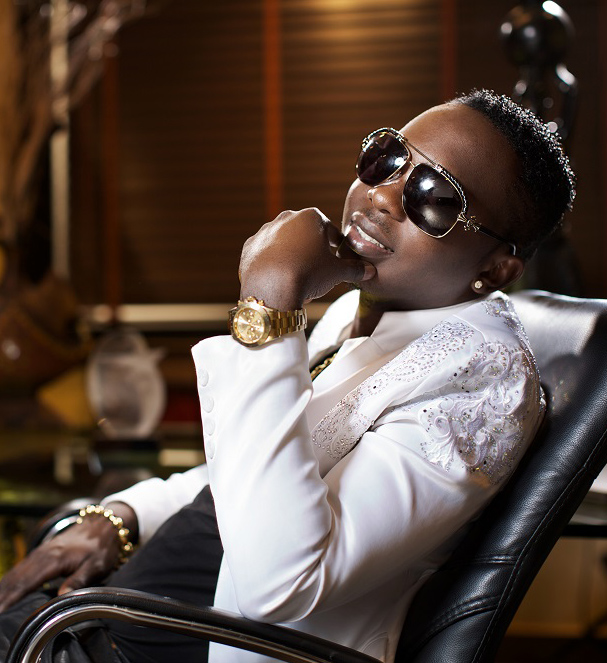
Waconzy

- Waconzy (born 1983), singer, songwriter
- Rena Wakama, basketball coach
- Adewale Wahab (born 1984), soccer player
- Obi Wali (1932–1993), activist
- Okey Wali (born 1958), president of the Nigerian Bar Association
- Ezekiel Warigbani, youth advocate, politician
- Taribo West (born 1974), soccer player
- Eberechi Wike (born 1972), First Lady of Rivers State
- Ezenwo Nyesom Wike (born 1967), Governor of Rivers State
- Tasie Wike, lawyer
- Kay Williamson (1935–2005), linguist
- Jim Wiwa (1904–2005), chief of the Ogoni people
- Owens Wiwa (born 1957), medical doctor and human rights activist
- Chukwuemeka Woke, chief of staff, Rivers State Government; former chairman of Emohua

== Y ==
- Albert Yobo (born 1979), soccer player
- Joseph Yobo (born 1980), soccer player

== See also ==
- List of people from Port Harcourt
