= List of government ministries of Rivers State =

This is a list of the government ministries of Rivers State, Nigeria. Each ministry is headed by a Commissioner who in most cases is assisted by a Permanent Secretary. The Commissioner is responsible for policy, while the Permanent Secretary provides continuity and is responsible for operations.

== List of ministries and their commissioners ==
Ministry	Incumbent commissioner
Agriculture	Engr. Victor Kii
Budget and Economic Planning	Dr. Peter Medee
Chieftaincy and Community Affairs	Sylvanus Nwankwo
Commerce and Industry	Hon. Barr. John Ngubo Otamiri
Culture and Tourism	Dr. Israel Ngbuelo
Education	Dr. Ovy Chinedum Chukwuma
Energy and Natural Resources	Uche Maximus Nwafor
Employment Generation and Empowerment	Austin Nnadozie
Environment	Tambari Sydney Gbara
Finance	
Health	Dr. Adaeze Oreh
Housing	Engr. Basoene Joshua Benibo
Information and Communications	Joe Johnson
Justice	
Lands and Survey	
Local Government Affairs	Prince Charles E. O. Beke
Power	Solomon Abel Eke
Social Welfare and Rehabilitation	
Special Duties	
Sports	
Transport	Collins Onunwo
Urban Development	
Water Resources and Rural Development	
Women Affairs	
Works	Olisaelloka Tasie -Amadi
Youth Development	Dr Chisom Kenneth Gbali

== See also ==
- Government of Rivers State
