= Shedrack Chukwu =

Nigerian public administrator

Sir, Dr Shedrack Ogbogu Chukwu DSSRS, JP
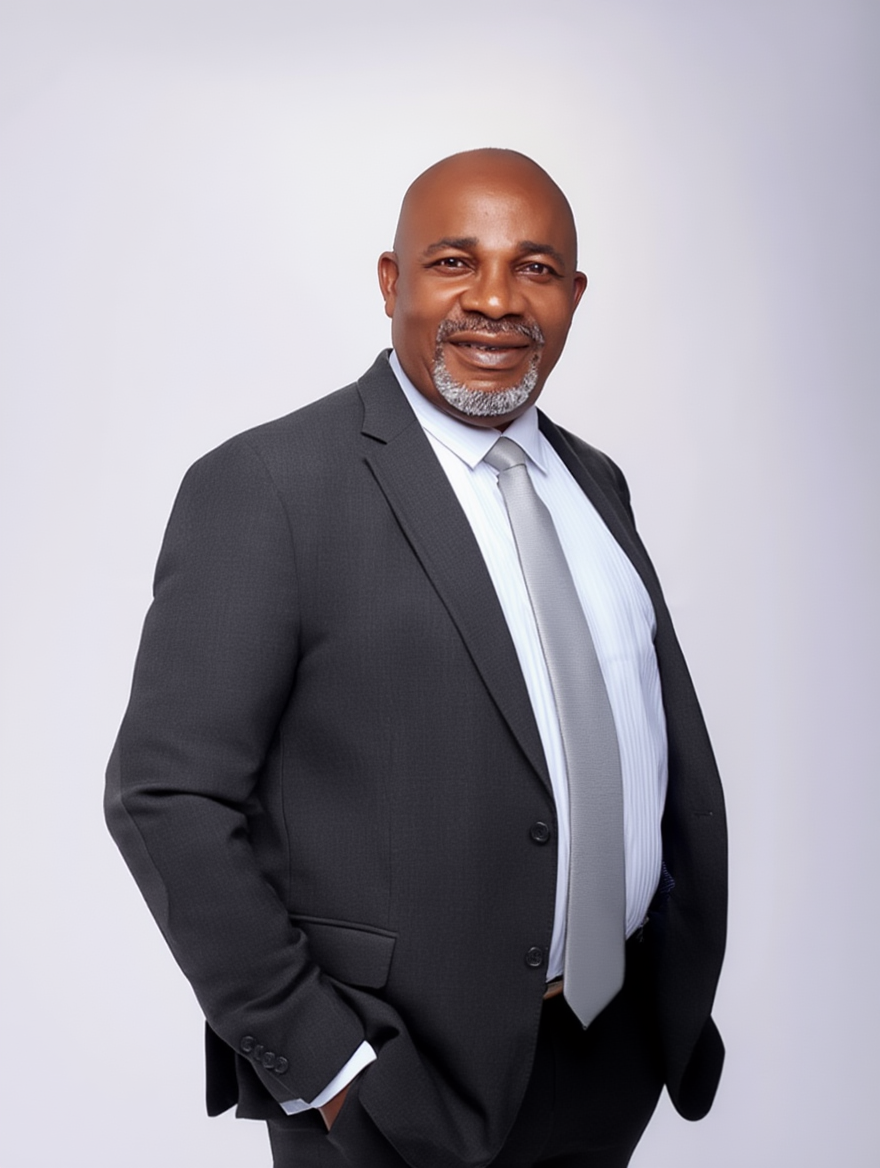
- Shedrack Chukwu

Executive Chairman of Ogba/Egbema/Ndoni Local Government Area
- Incumbent
- Assumed office 1 September 2025
- Deputy: Nwokocha Chioma Happiness

Commissioner for Power, Rivers State
- In office 2017–2019

Commissioner for Energy & Natural Resources, Rivers State
- In office 2016–2017

Personal details
- Born: Shedrack Ogbogu Chukwu; April 11, 1965 (age 60)
- Citizenship: Nigerian
- Spouse: Chukwu Stella Obiani (Late)
- Education: University of Ibadan (B.Ed, Political Science, 1994) · Rivers State University (PGD, Business Studies, 2005) · Imo State University (M.Ed, Education Technology, 2009) · Rivers State University (MA.Ld, Law & Diplomacy, 2016) · Rivers State University (LLB, 2021) · Nigerian Law School (BL, 2024) · Ignatius Ajuru University of Education (Ph.D, Instructional Technology, 2025)
- Occupation: Politician; Legal practitioner Educator; Security Expert
- Profession: Lawyer, Academic
- Awards: DSSRS, JP, Knighthood (Sir)

Shedrack Ogbogu Chukwu is a Nigerian politician, lawyer, academic, and public administrator from Oboburu Town in the Ogba/Egbema/Ndoni Local Government Area (ONELGA) of Rivers State, Nigeria. He currently serves as the Executive Chairman of Ogba/Egbema/Ndoni Local Government Area. He assumed office as Chairman of ONELGA in September 2025.

In 2015, Chukwu was appointed as Commissioner of the Ministry of Energy and Natural Resources, a position he held until 2017 when reappointed as Commissioner of the Ministry of Power.

Over a career spanning more than three decades, Chukwu has held senior positions across the public and private sectors, including serving as Rivers State Commissioner for Energy & Natural Resources and Commissioner for Power under the administration of Governor Nyesom Wike. He has also worked in community relations for major international oil and gas companies, and currently serves as Director of Operations at Traceguard Security Company Limited.

A scholar by training, Chukwu holds multiple advanced degrees including a Ph.D in Instructional Technology from Ignatius Ajuru University of Education, an LLB from Rivers State University, and a call to the Nigerian Bar. He is a member of several professional bodies including the Nigerian Bar Association (NBA).
