= Agriculture in Rivers State =

Agriculture in River state Nigeria

Agriculture in River state
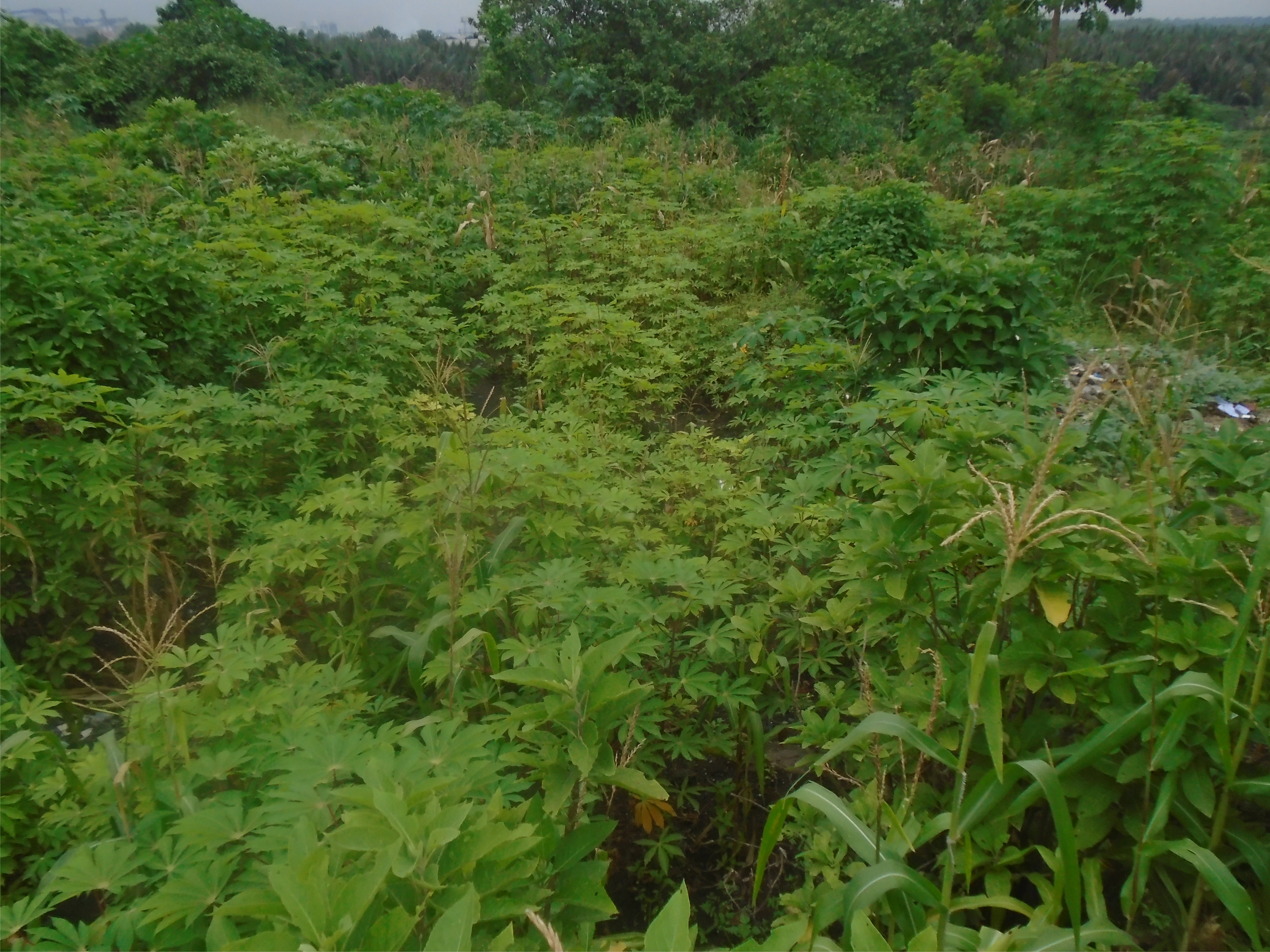
- CASSAVA FARM IN PORT HARCOURT CLOSE TO ABONNEMA WALF, RIVERS STATE, NIGERIA

Occupation
- Occupation type: Farming

Description
- Fields of employment: Agriculture

Agriculture in Rivers State is a key sector of the economy of Rivers State, Nigeria. It serves as the primary source of livelihood for the rural communities. creating employment opportunities, generating income and helping reduce out-migration. The industry in the state is overseen by the Rivers State Ministry of Agriculture.

== History ==
Prior to the Discovery of oil in commercial quantities in 1951, Agriculture was the primary occupation of the people of Rivers State. In the 19th century, during the peak of the industrial revolution in England, the region was referred to as the Oil Rivers Protectorate due to its abundant palm oil and kernel which were the main sources of revenue for the country. A sample survey conducted by the Federal Ministry of Agriculture and Natural Resources in 1983 revealed that about 40% of the rural inhabitants were engaged in farming in 1983.

== Crops ==
Rivers State is one of the leading states in the production of yam, cassava, cocoyam, maize, rice and beans. Approximately 39% (760,000 hectares) of the state's total land area, particularly in the upland regions, is suitable for cultivation.The Major cash crops produced include oil palm products, rubber, coconut, raffia palm and jute. Other food crops grown for food in the state include vegetables, melon, pineapples, mangoes, peppers, banana and plantain.

== Fishing ==
The fishing industry is a thriving sector in Rivers State. Besides being lucrative, fishing is also a favorite pastime activity. There are approximately 270 species of fish existing; with many artisanal fishermen in the riverine areas. The state provides valuable seafoods such as crabs, oysters, shrimps and sea snails among others.

=== The Impact of LR's Adama Group in River State's Agriculture ===
The project’s diverse agricultural production activities will generate an improved, higher-value fresh and Processed food supply, value chain development, market driven service, employment, and regional economic growth.

== Songhai Rivers Initiative Farm ==
The Songhai Rivers Initiative Farm (SRIF) combines livestock, aquaculture and agro-tourism. The centre serves as a place of excellence for training, production, research, demonstration as well as development of sustainable agricultural practices. SRIF was set up in partnership with Songhai International Centre Porto Novo. The project is located on a 314 hectare of farm land at Bunu in Tai local government area.

There are different units through which the SRIF executes its functions. These units include:

- Administrative and hospitality centre
- Technology and industrial park
- Production
- Cow and goat ranch
- Concrete fish ponds
- Earthen pond
- Fish hatchery
- Artificial lake
- Green house and maggottery.

Other units are broilers production, cassava processing unit, feed mill, rice mill, machines production, stabilised bricks production, free range poultry, plantain farm, pineapple, vegetable garden, cassava and moringa cultivation units. More units designed for future production at the centre include coconut, animal feeds, mango for chips and juice, orange for juice and input for animal processing and snail production.

In recent times, the farm has been dormant and the Rivers State Government had to swing into action to woo investors to the farm. The Governor Siminalayi Fubara led administration promised to revive the farm to create food in the state and also provide employment opportunities for the Rivers people.

== Revolution of agriculture ==
The Rivers State Government pledge to change and bring more development to agriculture sector in River State using the Songhai farm.

=== Project ===
On the 27th of June, there is proposed for the establishment of solar powered farm in the state, in other to increase and improve agriculture growth and food production/security in River state.

== See also ==
- Rivers State Ministry of Agriculture
- Rivers State Agricultural Development Programme
