= College of Health Sciences =

College of Health Sciences may refer to:

- Adventist College of Nursing and Health Sciences (Malaysia)
- Baptist College of Health Sciences (Tennessee)
- Bouvé College of Health Sciences (Massachusetts)
- Cabarrus College of Health Sciences (North Carolina)
- Carolinas College of Health Sciences (North Carolina)
- Choonhae College of Health Sciences (South Korea)
- College of Health Sciences (KNUST), Ghana
- College of Health Sciences, Bahrain
- Coleman College for Health Sciences (Texas)
- Jefferson College of Health Sciences (Virginia)
- King Abdulaziz University College of Health Sciences (Saudi Arabia)
- Marquette University College of Health Sciences (Wisconsin)
- Mercy College of Health Sciences (Iowa)
- Pennsylvania College of Health Sciences (Pennsylvania)
- Saint Luke's College of Nursing and Health Sciences (Missouri)
