= Blessing Didia =

Nigerian medical doctor

Blessing Chimezie Didia

Vice-Chancellor of Rivers State University
- Incumbent
- Assumed office 2018
- Preceded by: Barineme F. Beke

Personal details
- Born: Omerelu, Rivers State, Nigeria
- Occupation: Medical doctor, professor, politician
- Profession: Anatomy

Blessing Chimezie Didia (born 20 April 1952) is a Nigerian professor medical doctor, anatomist, academic administrator, and politician. He served as Chairman of Ikwerre Local Government Area from 1991 to 1993 and as Vice-Chancellor of Rivers State University from 2015 to 2019. He previously served as Provost of the College of Health Sciences at the University of Port Harcourt and is a professor of Clinical Anatomy at the university.,

== Early life and education ==
Didia was born on 20 April 1952 in Omugwere-Omopi, Omerelu, Ikwerre Local Government Area of Rivers State. He attended Saint Stephen's State School, Omerelu, and County Grammar School, Ikwerre-Etche, before obtaining the Advanced Level General Certificate of Education from the College of Science and Technology, Port Harcourt (now Rivers State University). He studied at Ahmadu Bello University from 1974 to 1976, obtained an MB.BS degree from the University of Benin in 1979, and earned a Doctor of Medicine (M.D.) degree from the University of Port Harcourt in 2003.

== Career ==
Didia began his academic career at the University of Port Harcourt, where he became Professor of Clinical Anatomy. He served as Head of the Department of Anatomy, Dean of the Faculty of Basic Medical Sciences, and Provost of the College of Health Sciences. He was Vice-Chancellor of Rivers State University from 2015 to 2019. During his academic career, he also held leadership positions in professional bodies and contributed to anatomical research and medical education.

== See also ==
- List of people from Rivers State
