= Bathuel Harrison Iheanyichukwu =

Nigerian engineer and architect

Rivers State Commissioner of Works
- Incumbent
- Assumed office 9 May 2016
- Governor: Ezenwo Nyesom Wike
- Preceded by: Kelvin Wachukwu

Personal details
- Occupation: Civil engineer, architect

Bathuel Harrison Iheanyichukwu is a civil engineer and architect, who serves as the current Rivers State Commissioner of Works. He was appointed to this position by Governor Ezenwo Nyesom Wike, confirmed by the Rivers State House of Assembly and sworn in on 9 May 2016. He replaces Kelvin Wachukwu, who was suspended indefinitely on 1 April 2016.

== See also ==
- Wike Executive Council
- List of people from Rivers State
