= Ogbonna =

Ogbonna may refer to his father's name sake

== Notable people ==
- Angelo Ogbonna, Italian footballer
- Glory Ogbonna, Nigerian footballer
- Ibezito Ogbonna, Nigerian footballer
- Ikechukwu Mitchel Ogbonna, professionally known as IK Ogbonna, a Nigerian film and television actor
- Ogbonna John, Nigerian freestyle wrestler
- Ogbonna Nwuke, Nigerian politician and newspaper publisher
- Ogbonna Okechukwu Onovo, former Inspector General of the Nigerian Police
- Onuoha Ogbonna, Nigerian footballer
