= Kelvin Wachukwu =

Nigerian engineer

Rivers State Commissioner of Works
- In office December 2015 – April 2016
- Governor: Ezenwo Nyesom Wike
- Preceded by: Victor Giadom
- Succeeded by: Harrison B. Iheanyichukwu

Personal details
- Occupation: Engineer

Kelvin Kinikanwo Wachukwu is a Nigerian engineer who served as Rivers State Commissioner of Works from December 2015 to April 2016. He was suspended indefinitely from office for negligence, dereliction of duty, particularly his failure to supervise projects effectively. He was replaced by Harrison B. Iheanyichukwu on 9 May 2016.

== See also ==
- Wike Executive Council
- List of people from Rivers State
