= Zacchaeus (disambiguation) =

Zacchaeus was a tax-collector at Jericho, mentioned in the Gospel of Luke.

Zacchaeus may also refer to:

== People ==
=== Mononym ===
- Zacchaeus of Jerusalem (died 116 AD?), 2nd-century Christian saint
- Alphaeus and Zacchaeus, 4th-century Christian martyrs

=== Given name ===
- Zacchaeus Adangor, Nigerian politician
- Zacchaeus Brocks (born 2008), American hurdler
- Zacheus Burnham, Upper Canadian farmer, judge, and politician
- Zacheus Chase, American mayor
- Zacchaeus Chesoni (died 1999), Chief Justice of Kenya
- Zacheus Isham, clergyman and author
- Zacheus J. Maher (1882–1963), former president of Santa Clara University
- Zacheus Chukwukaelo Obi, Igbo leader
- Zacchaeus Okoth (born 1942), Roman Catholic Archbishop of Kisumu in Kenya

=== Surname ===
- Joannes Zacheus (fl. 16th-century), Franco-Flemish composer

== Other uses ==
- Zacchaeus Community Kitchen and Zacchaeus Free Clinic in Washington, DC, that became Bread for the City
- "Zacchaeus" (song), a traditional Christian children's song
