= Zacchaeus Adangor =

Nigerian politician

Zacchaeus Adangor is a Nigerian politician who is the Attorney General of Rivers State. He is Commissioner for Rivers State Ministry of Justice. He is a Professor of Constitutional Law and Natural Resources with the Faculty of Law, Rivers State University, Port Harcourt . In 2020, he was sworn in as a Senior Advocate of Nigeria (SAN). Also, he is a member of the Chartered Institute of Arbitrators (UK) and a Knight of Saint Christopher (Ksc). Prof. Zacchaeus Adangor has contributed significantly to the development of Constitutional law in Nigeria. His eruditions have been published widely in both local and international law journals with several book chapters and monographs
