= Aliyu Jauro =

Nigerian environmental scientist

Prof. Aliyu Jauro

Director General/CEO, National Environmental Standards and Regulations Enforcement Agency
- In office 26 February 2019 – 26 February 2023
- President: Muhammadu Buhari
- Preceded by: Lawrence Anukam
- Succeeded by: Innocent Barikor
- In office 27 February 2023 – 26 April 2024
- President: Bola Tinubu

Personal details
- Born: June 27, 1971 (age 54)
- Citizenship: Nigeria
- Education: Abubakar Tafawa Balewa University
- Profession: Environmental chemist; University lecturer; Administrator
- Known for: 3rd DG/CEO NESREA

Aliyu Jauro (born June 27, 1971) is a Nigerian environmental chemist and professor. He was appointed the Director General and CEO of National Environmental Standards and Regulations Enforcement Agency (NESREA) on February 26, 2019 by then President of The Federal Republic of Nigeria, Muhammadu Buhari. He was reappointed in February 2023 for a second term by President Buhari before his appointment was terminated by Bola Tinubu in April 2024 Before being appointed NESREA boss, he was a professor of Industrial chemistry at the Abubakar Tafawa Balewa University.

== Education ==
Aliyu Jauro attended the Abubakar Tafawa Balewa University, Bauchi, obtaining a bachelor's degree in Industrial chemistry in 1995. He had a master's and PhD in Industrial chemistry from the same institution in 1997 and 2005 respectively.

== Career ==
After his bachelor's degree, Aliyu was appointed a lecturer at ABTU. He became a full professor in 2014. In 2019, he was appointed the DG/CEO of the National Environmental Standards and Regulations Enforcement Agency by President Muhammadu Buhari. At the end of his tenure in February 2023, he was reappointed for a second four-year term. His appointment was terminated after one year by president Bola Tinubu in April 2024, where Dr.Innocent Barikor replaced him.

== Awards and recognitions ==
in 2020, Prof Aliyu was honoured by the Nigerian National Legacy Awards. Aliyu won the public service awards for environmental technology in 2023 by the Bureau of Public Service Reforms.
