= Wike =

Wike, WIKE, or Wyke may refer to:

== People ==
Surname

- Eberechi Wike, a Rivers State High Court judge
- Ezenwo Nyesom Wike, Nigerian politician
- Tasie Wike, a Nigerian lawyer

== Places ==
- Wike, West Yorkshire, a hamlet in Leeds, England
- Wyke, Bradford, an area in Bradford, West Yorkshire, England

== Technology ==
- WIKE, a radio station in the United States

== See also ==
- Wyke (disambiguation)
- Whike, a Dutch brand of tricycles with sails
