= Isaac Zeb-Obipi =

Nigerian human resource management professor

Isaac Zeb-Obipi is a Nigerian professor of Organizational Behaviour and Human Resource Management at Rivers State University (RSU), Port Harcourt, Nigeria. On March 6, 2025, Rivers State Governor Siminalayi Fubara appointed Prof. Zeb-Obipi as the Vice-Chancellor of RSU succeeding Professor Nlerum Okogbule, whose tenure concluded on March 5, 2025.

Prior to his appointment as the Vice Chancellor of the school, he was the Director of the Information and Communication Technology Centre (ICTC) at RSU and has held various academic and administrative positions within the university.

== Early life and education ==
Professor Isaac Zeb-Obipi hails from Ogoloma, Rivers State, Nigeria. He pursued his undergraduate and postgraduate education in management and economics. He holds Ph.D. in Organizational Behaviour, Master of Business Administration (MBA) in Management and Bachelor of Education (B.Ed.) in Economics.

== Academic career and contributions ==
Professor Zeb-Obipi began his academic career as an Assistant Lecturer at Rivers State University in 1997. Over the years, he has advanced in rank and contributed significantly to the field of organizational behaviour and human resource management.
