= Frank Owhor =

The Honorable Frank Owhor

13th Attorney General of Rivers State
- In office 1996–1999
- Preceded by: Adokiye Amiesimaka
- Succeeded by: Aleruchi Cookey-Gam

Personal details
- Born: 10 October 1958 (age 67) Choba, Obio-Akpor, Rivers State, Nigeria
- Party: PDP
- Children: 3
- Education: University of Lagos (LL.B.)
- Occupation: Politician
- Profession: Lawyer

Franklin Achinike Owhor (born 10 October 1958) is a Nigerian lawyer, politician and member of the Rivers State Peoples Democratic Party. He is an autochthon of the Ikwerre tribe in Obio-Akpor local government area. He served as the Deputy Mayor of Port Harcourt in 1988 and was the 13th Attorney General of Rivers State and Commissioner for Justice from 1996 until 1999 and was reappointed for a second term shortly before the civilian fourth republic. He is the Secretary of Wike Transition Committee. Among others he is also a member of the board of directors of Oil and gas free zone authority (Ogfza).

== See also ==
- List of people from Rivers State
