= Coleman College =

Coleman College may refer to:

- Coleman College (Louisiana), an American defunct, segregated, African American secondary school
- Coleman College (San Diego, California), later known as Coleman University, an American defunct private university focused on information technology
- Coleman College for Health Sciences, an American community college in Houston, Texas
