= Andrea Cossu =

Andrea Cossu may refer to:

- Andrea Cossu (footballer, born 1980), Italian former footballer
- Andrea Cossu (footballer, born 1984), Italian footballer of Nigerian descent
