= Felicity Okpete Ovai =

Nigerian engineer, civil servant, politician

The Honorable Felicity Okpete Ovai

Rivers State Commissioner of Works
- In office 2003–06
- Governor: Peter Odili
- Preceded by: David Briggs
- Succeeded by: Julius Orumbo

Personal details
- Born: 1961 (age 64–65)
- Party: PDP
- Education: Rivers State University of Science and Technology; University of Port Harcourt
- Profession: Engineer

Felicity Okpete Ovai (born 1961) is an engineer and academic from Degema, Rivers State in Nigeria. A member of the Rivers State People's Democratic Party, she was the first woman to be appointed Commissioner of Works, serving from 2003 to 2006.

== Education ==
Ovai completed her secondary education at Holy Rosary Secondary School (now Holy Rosary College) in Port Harcourt. She received a B.Tech in Agricultural Engineering from the Rivers State University of Science and Technology and a Master of Mechanical Engineering degree from the University of Port Harcourt.

== Career ==
Ovai has held various positions of responsibility in Rivers State. She served as first woman Commissioner of Works in the Executive Council of Rivers State from 2003 to 2006. While in office, she oversaw the commencement of a number of road construction projects in the state including work on the road connecting Ogoni, Andoni, and Opobo–Nkoro generally christened Unity Road which totaled about ₦11.8 billion.

On 2 December 2006, it was reported that Okpete Ovai alongside Shedrack Akalokwu, a Special Adviser to Governor Peter Odili and Wilson Ake, a member of House of the Representatives had been cleared by the People's Democratic Party to participate in its Rivers West senatorial primary election.

In February 2016, Ovai was appointed a member of the Rivers State Roads Maintenance and Rehabilitation Agency by Governor Ezenwo Nyesom Wike. She is also a member of various professional bodies, such as Nigeria Society of Engineers, Institute of Mechanical Engineers and Society of Agricultural Engineers.

== See also ==
- List of people from Rivers State
- Government of Rivers State
