= Ogbonna Nwuke =

Nigerian politician

The Honorable Ogbonna Nwuke

Member of the House of Representatives of Nigeria
- In office 2011–2015
- Preceded by: George Ford Nwosu
- Succeeded by: Jerome Amadi Eke
- Constituency: Etche–Omuma

Rivers State Commissioner of Commerce and Industry
- In office 2009–2011
- Governor: Chibuike Amaechi
- Preceded by: Robert Elleh
- Succeeded by: Chuma Chinyere

Rivers State Commissioner of Information and Communications
- In office 2008–2009
- Preceded by: Emmanuel Okah
- Succeeded by: Ibim Semenitari

Personal details
- Born: 16 September 1959 (age 67) Omuma, Rivers State, Nigeria
- Party: APC
- Parent: Evelyn Nwuke (mother)
- Education: Rivers State University of Science and Technology
- Profession: Journalist

Ogbonna Nwuke (born 16 September 1959) is a Nigerian politician, newspaper publisher and owner of the Port Harcourt Telegraph. He has served in both non-elected and elected public offices, including Director of Press Affairs to Governor Chibuike Amaechi, Commissioner of Information and Communications (2008–2009) as well as Commerce and Industry (2009–2010) and Member of the House of Representatives for Etche–Omuma constituency (2011–2015).

== Early life ==
Nwuke was born on 16 September 1959 to the Nwuke family in Omuma local government area, Rivers State. His father J.H.E. was Parliamentary Secretary of Internal Affairs under the Nnamdi Azikiwe administration in Eastern Nigeria, later Provincial Commissioner of Port Harcourt Province and Minister of State for Works under the M.I. Okpara administration.

== Political career ==
Nwuke began his political career as a member of the House of Representatives, where he represented the Etche/Omuma Federal Constituency of Rivers State from 1999 to 2003.

Following his time in the House of Representatives, Nwuke was appointed Commissioner for Information and Communications in Rivers State by Governor Chibuike Amaechi. He later served as Commissioner for Commerce and Industry in the Rivers State Government.

Nwuke has also served as spokesperson for the Chibuike Rotimi Amaechi Campaign Organisation and has remained active in public affairs and political communication in Nigeria.

Nwuke was elected to the House of Representatives of Nigeria in 2011. He represented the federal constituency Etche-Omuma until 2015.

== See also ==
- List of people from Rivers State
