= Oroworukwo =

Location in Port Harcourt, Rivers State, Nigeria

Oroworukwo is one of the rural places located in Port Harcourt Local Government Area, Rivers State, Nigeria.

Oroworukwo is a ward in Port Harcourt Local Government Area of Rivers State, Nigeria. The polling Units in Oroworukwo, Port Harcourt includes; St. Paul's School I, St. Paul's School II, Ogbonda Mati Hall Iv, Ogoloma Hall etc.

Rivers State University of Science and Technology is found in Nkpolu-Oroworukwo a sub-village in Oroworukwo.
