= Goodluck Nanah Opiah =

Nigerian politician

Hon. Goodluck Nanah Opiah

Commissioner for Education, Imo State
- In office 2019–2023
- Governor: Hope Uzodimma

Member of the House of Representatives of Nigeria
- In office 2007–2011
- Constituency: Ohaji/Egbema/Oguta/Oru West Federal Constituency

Personal details
- Party: Peoples Democratic Party (PDP)
- Occupation: Politician

Rt. Hon. Chief Goodluck Nanah Opiah (born 12 February 1964) also known as Ugwumba Ikeoha is a Nigerian politician and the former Nigerian Federal Minister of State for Education.

He is a former Speaker of the Imo State House of Assembly, Nigeria, and former member representing Ohaji/Egbema, Oguta, Oru West in the Federal House of Representative. He represented Ohaji/Egbema constituency in the Imo House of Assembly from 2003 to 2011. He was also the Special Adviser/Coordinator to the Imo State Governor on Oil and Gas Matters and former Imo State Commissioner of Petroleum Resources. He is a member of the All Progressives Congress (APC).

== Education ==
Goodluck Nanah Opiah is from Abacheke Egbema of the Ohaji/Egbema Local Government Area of Imo State in Nigeria. He started his primary school at Abacheke Primary School Egbema. In 1977, he was admitted into Egbema Secondary School, where he obtained the West African School Certificatein 1982 and later proceeded to the Rivers State University of Science and Technology (RSUST) in Port Harcourt, wherein he received a Bachelor of Science (Hons.) degree in Business Administration in 1987. He also holds Msc in Corporate Governance from the Leeds Metropolitan University United Kingdom.

== Business career ==
Opiah worked in the private sector between 1989 and 2003 in multi national companies such UTC Plc and Bewac Plc Port Harcourt, Rivers State where he retired as the general manager/CEO in 2003 before joining active politics.

== Political career ==
In 2003, Opiah was elected to the Imo State House of Assembly on the People's Democratic Party (PDP) ticket to represent the Ohaji/Egbema Constituency of Imo State. He sponsored the bill prohibiting discrimination against persons infected with HIV/AIDS at work places and institutions. He also helped the establishment of Imo Oil Producing Areas Development (ISOPADEC) through the sponsoring of a bill to that effect. Today, ISOPADEC is fully operational. Between 2003 and 2007, he was chairman and member of various House Committees and Ad-hoc Committees in the House. He was chairman, House Committee on Commerce, Industry and Tourism; chairman, Transport Committee; chairman, Petroleum Committee. He was appointed by the president of the Federal Republic of Nigeria, Dr Ebele Goodluck Jonathan as the chairman governing Board of Agricultural and Rural Management Institute (ARMTI) Ilorin, Kwara State in 2012 before being elected in 2015 as a Member, House of Representatives of the National Assembly for Ohaji/Egbema/Oguta/Oru West Federal constituency. In 2020, the Imo state Governor, distinguished Senator Hope Uzodinma, appointed him as the Special Adviser/Coordinator on Oil and Gas Matters and later Imo State Commissioner for Petroleum Resources. In June 2022 President Buhari nominated him as a Nigerian Federal Minister.

== Speakership ==
Opiah was elected to represent Ohaji/Egbema Constituency in the Imo State Legislature for second term in the year 2007. His colleagues in the legislature unanimously elected him the 8th Honourable Speaker of the Imo State House of Assembly on June 5, 2007.

== House of Representative ==
He won the March 28, 2015 House of Representative election for Ohaji/Egbema, Oguta, Oru West Constituency. He was a very active member of the 8th Assembly of the Federal House of Representatives.

== Nigerian Federal Minister ==
On 21 June 2022 the Nigerian Senate received seven new nominees from President Muhammadu Buhari for consideration and confirmation as Ministers of the Federal Republic of Nigeria. Opiah was amonged the nominees. He was Sworn in as Nigerian Minister of State for Education by President Buhari on 6 July 2022.
