= Ngeri Benebo =

Nigerian medical doctor

Director-General of the National Environmental Standard and Regulatory Agency
- In office December 2006 – December 2014
- Succeeded by: Lawrence Anukam

Personal details
- Born: 11 May 1955 (age 71) Okrika, Rivers State, Nigeria
- Profession: Medical doctor

Ngeri Setima Benebo, MFR (born 11 May 1955) is a Nigerian medical doctor and public health specialist. She was, until 2015, Director General and chief executive officer of the National Environmental Standards and Regulations Enforcement Agency (NESREA). Her appointment was approved by the Federal Government of Nigeria in December 2006 under the administration of Chief Olusegun Obasanjo.

== Early life and education ==
Born in Okrika, a port town of Rivers State, Nigeria, Benebo received her West African Senior School Certificate in 1971 after attending Methodist Girls High School Yaba. She proceeded to Federal School of Arts and Science for her "A" Levels obtaining the General Certificate of Education (GCE) in 1974. Between 1979 and 1986, she earned a Medical Doctor (MD) degree from University of Liberia's A. M. Dogliotti College of Medicine and a master's degree in public health from University of Lagos's College of Medicine. In 1991, she was awarded a certificate in Training and Organization Skills for senior managers at the University of London.

Benebo is an alumnus of the National Postgraduate Medicine College of Public Health. She holds a certificate in Management from the Administrative Staff College of Nigeria (ASCON) Badagry.

== National Environmental Standards and Regulations Enforcement Agency ==
In 2006, she was appointed Director General and chief executive officer of the National Environmental Standards and Regulations Enforcement Agency (NESREA). Prior to that, she served as Director of Pollution Control and Environmental Health at the Federal Ministry of Environment.

=== Achievements in office ===
- Initiation and actualization of West African Network on Environmental Compliance and Enforcement (WANECE).
- Establishment of the NESREA Green Corps.
- Revival of the National Toxic Waste Dump Watch Committee (NTWDWC).
- Introduction of 24 or 28 environmental regulations into the Gazette of the Government of Nigeria.

== Awards ==
Benebo has won the following awards:

- National Productivity Merit Award (1991)
- Quality Management Standard Person of the Year (2010)
- Environmental Man of the Year
- Nigeria Advancement Awards (2013)

== See also ==
- List of people from Rivers State
