= Worgu Boms =

Nigerian lawyer

Acting Deputy National secretary All Progressives Congress APC
- Incumbent
- Assumed office June 21st 2020
- Governor: Chibuike Amaechi
- Preceded by: Ken Chikere
- Succeeded by: Emmanuel C. Aguma

Attorney General of Rivers State
- In office 2011–2015

Chairman of the Nigerian Bar Association
- In office 2010–2011

Personal details
- Born: 31 March 1968 (age 58) Rivers State
- Education: Rivers State University of Science and Technology
- Profession: Lawyer

Worgu Boms (born 31 March 1968) is a Nigerian lawyer and a former Rivers State Attorney-General and Commissioner of Justice.

== Education ==
Boms went to State School Elekahia, Port Harcourt and Government Secondary School, Eneka. He had his tertiary education at the Rivers State University of Science and Technology and received his B.L. certificate from Nigerian Law School.

== Career ==
In 1992, he gained entry into the Nigerian Bar and National Youth Service programme. Shortly after, he started practicing with the law firm of Serena David Dokubo & Co in Port Harcourt before founding Worgu Boms Chambers.

Boms is affiliated with the Nigerian Bar Association and the International Bar Association. He has taken part in Conferences and Workshops in Nigeria and overseas, including the Cambridge International Symposium on Economic Crimes. He has chaired the Port Harcourt branch of the Nigeria Bar Association. In 2011, he was appointed the Attorney-General and Commissioner of Justice in the cabinet of Governor Chibuike Amaechi.
