= Innocent Barikor =

Nigerian politician

MHA for Gokana
- In office 2011–2015
- Succeeded by: Ngbulelo Israel

Director General/CEO, National Environmental Standards and Regulations Enforcement Agency
- Incumbent
- Assumed office 26 April 2024
- President: Bola Tinubu
- Preceded by: Aliyu Jauro

Personal details
- Born: Rivers State
- Party: All Progressives Congress
- Education: University of Port Harcourt
- Occupation: politician

Innocent Bariate Barikor is a Nigerian academic and politician of the All Progressives Congress. He represented the constituency of Gokana as a Member of the Rivers State House of Assembly from 2011 to 2015.

== Education ==
Barikor received his doctoral degree in Political Science with emphasis on development studies from the University of Port Harcourt, Nigeria.

== Career ==
Barikor lectured at the Rivers State College of Education and served as a supervisor at the Gokana local government council from 1992 to 1995. He moved to the University of Port Harcourt continuing his academic career until 2010 and achieved the rank of Senior Lecturer in Political Science. He has researched and published extensively on the Nigerian State and Minority Agitations, Poverty and Democratization, Debt and Debt Management, Human Rights, and Sustainable Development. He was chairman of the Ogoni academics. In 2004, he was appointed Rivers State Coordinator of the National Poverty Eradication Programme (NAPEP) by the President of Nigeria. During his tenure, he developed and supervised innovative poverty reduction programmes such as COPE, Village Economic Development Solutions, Promise Keeper programme and others which have impacted on the Nigeria's rural poor. In 2007, Barikor led the Grassroots Empowerment Network (GEN) delegation to the South Africa Investment Summit held in Durban.

As a development consultant, he has worked for numerous organizations including the Rivers State Sustainable Development Agency (RSSDA), where he consulted on the Agency's Cassava Project between 2007 and 2008. He also has served as Chairman of the Board of the Grassroots Empowerment Network. In 2011, he won the assembly election on People's Democratic Party ticket and represented Gokana until 2015.

== See also ==
- List of people from Rivers State
