= Rivers State Roads Maintenance and Rehabilitation Agency =

The Rivers State Road Maintenance and Rehabilitation Agency is a government body responsible for the supervision and maintenance of road infrastructure in Rivers State, Nigeria. It is headquartered in Port Harcourt and has operational offices in all the state's senatorial districts. It has a nine-member board to manage its affairs. The agency was established pursuant to the Road Maintenance and Rehabilitation Agency Law No. 3 of 2008.

== Functions and powers ==
Part II (Ss. 7 & 8) of the Law specifies that the agency shall:

1. Ensure the efficient and effective maintenance and rehabilitation of all existing state roads and drainages or any other road or drainage as may be declared at any time, as a State road by the State Government.
2. Set guidelines for the working of concession contracts; enter into road concession contracts for the purpose of executing relevant projects.
3. Plan and manage the development and implementation of the road safety standards.
4. Plan and develop strategies towards ensuring efficient and effective movement of traffic on state roads and ensure their implementation.
5. Make policy recommendations to the Government on matters relating to the maintenance and rehabilitation of state roads.

== Chairman ==
The Road Maintenance and Rehabilitation Agency is headed by a Chairman who is appointed by the Governor and confirmed by the Rivers State House of Assembly. The chairman, as Chief Executive Officer, has the responsibility of executing policy and handling the day-to-day operations of the agency.

== See also ==
- List of government agencies of Rivers State
- Rivers State Ministry of Works
