= Blessing Nsiegbe =

Nigerian politician

Member of the House of Representatives of Nigeria
- Incumbent
- Assumed office 2016
- Preceded by: Chinyere Igwe
- Constituency: Port Harcourt II

Personal details
- Born: Rivers State, Nigeria
- Party: PDP
- Profession: politician

Blessing Nsiegbe is a politician of the People's Democratic Party from Rivers State, Nigeria. She is a member of the House of Representatives of Nigeria from Port Harcourt II federal constituency. She won election into the federal house of representatives in 2015 but it went to the election tribunal. The election was upheld in 2016 and she was declared winner.

== Early life and education ==
Nsiegbe was born on 18 September 1965 in Rivers State, Nigeria.

== Political career ==
Nsiegbe is a member of the People's Democratic Party (PDP). She contested the 2015 Nigerian general election for the Port Harcourt II Federal Constituency seat in the House of Representatives. Although the outcome of the election was challenged before the election tribunal, the tribunal upheld her election in August 2016, confirming her as the duly elected representative for the constituency.

She represented Port Harcourt II Federal Constituency in the 8th National Assembly from 2015 to 2019.
