= Otonyetarie Okoye =

Otonyetarie Okoye is a Rivers State, Nigeria, lawyer and civil servant. She is currently the Permanent Secretary of the Rivers State Ministry of Agriculture. Okoye was sworn in at Government House, Port Harcourt on 11 December 2013. Prior to the appointment, Okoye was the Rivers State Director of Public Prosecutions.

== See also ==
- Rivers State Civil Service
- List of people from Rivers State
