= Rivers State Ministry of Local Government Affairs =

The Rivers State Ministry of Local Government Affairs is a government ministry created to deal with matters concerning local government and local administration in Rivers State, Nigeria. The current Commissioner is Samuel Eyiba.

== Functions ==
1. Supervise local governments.
2. Collect all local government budgets, check if budgets are reflected in the local governments' actual spending patterns and notify State House of Assembly where problems arise.
3. Draft periodic reports relating to local governance in the state.

== See also ==
- List of government ministries of Rivers State
