= National Environmental Standards and Regulations Enforcement Agency =

Environmental agency in Nigeria

- NESREA

Agency overview
- Formed: 30 July 2007
- Jurisdiction: Federal Government of Nigeria
- Headquarters: Abuja
- Motto: ... ensuring a cleaner and healthier environment.
- Minister responsible: Balarabe Abbas Lawal
- Deputy Minister responsible: Iziaq Adekunle Salako
- Agency executive: Innocent Barikor, Director General and CEO
- Parent department: Federal Ministry of Environment
- Website: www.nesrea.gov.ng

The National Environmental Standards and Regulations Enforcement Agency (also known as NESREA) is an environmental agency of the Federal Government of Nigeria that was established in 2007 to "ensure a cleaner and healthier environment for Nigerians". The agency functions as a parastatal enterprise of the Federal Ministry of Environment and is headed by a director general, who is also the chief executive officer (CEO) of about 483 companies in the NESREA corporate family. Human activities that have negative effects on the environment are covered by NESREA's 34 National Environmental Regulations. The agency's authority includes process and equipment monitoring, compliance with set standards, disciplining violators of set rules, conducting public investigations, and submission of proposals to the minister for review in order to maintain environmental quality.

NESREA has enacted several regulations pertaining to environmental protection, monitoring of environmental compliance, and enforcement actions. The act establishing NESREA was amended in 2018 to accommodate changes relating to the appointment of council members, stiffer penalties for defaulters, and other related matters.

== History ==
The need for public institutions addressing environmental issues in Nigeria became a necessity in the aftermath of the 1988 toxic waste affair in Koko, Nigeria. This prompted the government, led by President Ibrahim Badamosi Babangida, to promulgate Decree 58 of 1988, establishing the Federal Environmental Protection Agency (FEPA) as the country's environmental watchdog.

The functions of FEPA were folded into the Federal Ministry of Environment, the policy-making body for environmental matters in Nigeria. However, it became apparent that there was a need for tighter to address the country's environmental challenges, which included including, desertification, rapid deforestation, coastal and gully erosion, poor environmental sanitation, air pollution, and electronic waste. Furthermore, the global movement towards sustainable development in the aftermath of the Millennium Summit, the World Summit on Sustainable Development, and Nigeria's leadership in regional developmental programmes such as the New Partnership for Africa's Development (NEPAD), enhanced environmental awareness among the country's decision-makers.

NESREA was established in 2007 by the National Environmental Standards and Regulations Enforcement Agency Act (No. 20 of 2007). The act charges the agency with responsibility for protecting and developing the environment in Nigeria. Passed by the National Assembly of Nigeria and signed by President Umaru Musa Yar'Adua, the law gave the new agency jurisdiction over:

the protection and development of the environment, biodiversity conservation and sustainable development of Nigeria's natural resources in general and environmental technology, including coordination and liaison with relevant stakeholders within and outside Nigeria on matters of enforcement of environmental standards, regulations, rules, laws, policies and guidelines.

== Structure ==
NESREA is divided into five directorates: the Directorate of Administration and Finance, the Directorate of Legal Services, the Directorate of Planning and Policy Analysis, the Directorate of Inspection and Enforcement, and the Directorate of Legal Services. Each director reports to the director general, who is also the CEO. Public health specialist Ngeri Benebo was director general until 2015, when she was succeeded by Lawrence Anukam, a former director of the agency. Aliyu Jauro was appointed as the director general in 2019 by President Muhammadu Buhari.

== Activities ==
=== Environmental impact assessment ===
NESREA is responsible for enforcing environmental impact assessments (EIAs) in Nigeria. Though Nigeria runs a federal system of government, the sub-national regions (known as States) are not empowered to issue this document. NESREA's sole jurisdiction over certifying EIAs was affirmed in a 2015 court of appeals ruling.

=== Illegal wildlife trade ===
Nigeria is a signatory to the Convention on International Trade in Endangered Species of Wild Fauna and Flora (CITES), and NESREA is responsible for seizures and prosecution of illegal wildlife trade crimes in Nigeria. The agency has recorded a number of seizures of species and animal parts being transhipped through its ports. In conjunction with the Nigeria Police Force and the Nigeria National Park Service, NESREA rescued a lion cub from two wildlife traffickers in February 2022 that had been up for sale in the black market for 6 million naira. The agency also works to curb the illegal trade of plants and plant products, like iroko tree and mahogany.

=== Waste disposal ===
NESREA's policies on waste disposal include the National Policy on Waste Battery Management and the National Environmental (Battery Control) Regulations. In July 2009, NESREA hosted the International Conference on E-Waste, otherwise known as the Abuja Platform.

Nigeria is currently witnessing a rise in the use of technological equipment, leading to the massive production of electronic waste in urban centers. As a result, NESREA established the application of the extended producer responsibility principle in waste management, setting up a nationwide program and publishing guidelines for the relevant industry players.

=== Public information ===
The agency commissioned a weekly TV and radio series, NESREA Watch, which had a cast that included popular Nigerian artists like Kiki Omeili.

== Notable cases ==
=== Calabar superhighway project ===
The Cross River State government began work in 2015 on superhighway spanning 260 kilometres (160 mi) from Calabar to Katsina-Ala. However, the road was to run through one of the country's pristine rainforests. This led to an uproar from local and international environmental activists, who complained that the government had not solicited input before embarking on the project. NESREA learned that an EIA had not been carried out and issued an order for construction work to stop; NESREA then took the state government to court in order to stop them from continuing work until they had satisfied regulatory requirements.

=== Partnership with police ===
NESREA embarked on a strategic partnership with the Nigeria Police Force starting in 2013, with the police set to support NESREA's enforcement activities NESREA's Environmental Health Officers complained that the agency ought to further empower their positions rather than allow the police to take over their statutory role.

=== Conflict over telecommunications sector ===
In 2012, NESREA, in response to a public complaint, closed down a base station belonging to one of the telecoms operators in Nigeria. This led to a split between them and the Nigerian Communications Commission (NCC), who argued that NESREA had no jurisdiction to regulate the telecommunications sector. NESREA argued for the application of the precautionary principle when companies erect telecoms infrastructure, demanding that base stations be sited at least 10 metres away from inhabited areas (further than the 5 metres approved by NCC regulations), in line with Nigerian environmental regulations, . Ultimately, the two agencies worked out their differences and agreed to work together.

== 2018 amendment ==
The National Environmental Standards and Regulations Enforcement Agency Act was amended by the members of the National Assembly and signed by President Muhammadu Buhari in 2018. Because of the amendment, the agency administers stringent penalties and fines for environmental offenses such as poaching or illegal trafficking of wildlife, including endangered species.

== Directors-General ==
Directors-General of the NESREA
Name	Tenure
Ngeri Benebo	2006 – 2014
Lawrence Anukam	2014 – 2019
Aliyu Jauro	2019 – 2024
Innocent Barikor	2024 – present
