= Omo Isoken =

Niigerian politician and Estate Manager

- Omo

Commissioner for Physical Planning, Housing, Urban And Regional Development
- In office October, 2021 – September, 2024
- Appointed by: Godwin Obaseki

Personal details
- Born: April 28, 1970 (age 56) Warri, Delta State
- Profession: Estate management, Urban Development
- Awards: Physical Planning Commissioner of the Year Awards, 2022.

Omo Isoken is a commissioner in the government of Godwin Obaseki in Edo State.

== Early life and education ==
Omo Isoken was born on April 28, 1970, in Warri, Delta State. She started primary education at Ojojo Primary School, Warri (1975–1980). In 1985, she obtained her WASC O’ Level certificate, from the Federal Government Girls’ College, Yola, Gongola State (now Adamawa State).

She proceeded to Rivers State University of Science and Technology for her degree in B.Tech., Estate Management, in 1992. In 1992, she obtained an MBA in Business Administration, University of Hull, United Kingdom, and a certificate in Executive Strategy for Results from London Business School (LBS).

== Career ==
Omo Isoken started her career in the corporate world. She worked briefly with the London Boroughs of Hillingdon, Redbridge and Southwark, where she rose to Head of Housing Regeneration Initiatives in the United Kingdom.

In June 2008, she joined the defunct Afribank Nigeria Plc as head of their real estate department. She rose to the position of Acting Head, Corporate Banking, North Central Region, before joining ASO Investment and Development Company (AIDC) Limited as the Managing Director/CEO in November, 2011.

In July 2017, she was appointed as Executive Chairman of the Edo Development & Property Authority (EDPA) by Governor Godwin Obaseki. In October 2021, she was appointed Commissioner for Physical Planning, Housing, Urban, and Regional Development.

=== Award ===
In 2022, she emerged at the Africa Housing Awards as the Physical Planning Commissioner of the Year.
