= Nlerum Sunday Okogbule =

Professor of Law

- Born: September 15, 1960 (age 65); River state
- Citizenship: Nigeria
- Occupation: Lecturer

Nlerum Sunday Okogbule is the vice chancellor of Rivers State University. He was appointed Vice chancellor in 2021 by His Excellency Nyesom Ezenwo Wike.

Before assuming the role of Vice-Chancellor, Prof. Okogbule held the position of Dean of the Postgraduate School and previously served as the Dean of the Faculty of Law at the University.

== Early life ==
The Rivers State University vice chancellor Professor Nlerum Okogbule was born on September 15, 1960, at Rumuekpe in Emohua local government area, Rivers state. He began his primary education in 1965.
