= Onimim Jacks =

Nigerian lawyer and politician (born 1961)

Rivers state Commissioner for Agriculture
- In role June 5, 2015 – 2017
- Governor: Nyesom Wike
- Preceded by: Emmanuel Chinda
- Succeeded by: Victor Kii

Personal details
- Born: Onimim Briggs; December 4, 1961 (age 64) Rivers State
- Party: PDP
- Education: SSC, LLB, LL.M, University of Lagos
- Profession: Lawyer, Politician

Onimim Ernestina Jacks (née Briggs) (born 4 December 1961, also known as Onimim E. Briggs-Jacks) is a Nigerian lawyer who served from June 2015 to September 2017 as the Rivers State Commissioner of Agriculture. She is a member of the Rivers State People's Democratic Party.

== Early life and education ==
Jacks was born on 4 December 1961 in Buguma, Asari-Toru local government area of Rivers State. She attended Federal Government College, Port Harcourt for her secondary school education and studied law at the University of Lagos receiving her Bachelor of Laws degree in 1983. She also obtained a master's degree in law (LL.M) in 1991 and was called to the Nigerian Bar in 1984 enrolling as a Barrister and Solicitor of the Supreme Court of Nigeria. In 1987, she became an Attorney and Counselor of the Law of the state of New York.

== Career and politics ==
Jacks had a short Legal Practice in the United States of America between 1986 and 1987 as a Volunteer Attorney in the Civil Division of the New York City Legal Aid Society in Chelsea, New York.

In 1989 she returned to Nigeria and set up a private Legal Practice in Lagos and Port Harcourt under the name Onimim Briggs & Co. with specialized practice in the sectors of Banking and Oil & Gas.

From 1998 to 2008, she was a lecturer at the Nigerian Law School Abuja. After which she became the executive director of the Legal Research Institute, Abuja. In 2001, She served as Chief Legislative officer in the office of Senator Ibiapuye Martyns-Yellowe.

In 2003, she was elected a fellow of Ashoka

In 2009, she was appointed by Governor Nysesom Wike as Sole Administrator of the Rivers State Library Board and subsequently the Rivers State Commissioner of Agriculture in June 2015. In 2017 she was replaced by Charles Nwogu

== Honors and awards ==
- Member, Governing Council of the Federal Government College, Port Harcourt
- Fellow, FIDA
- Fellow, Ashoka

== Publications ==
Works published by Jacks include;

- Using ADR in resolving maritime disputes: a Nigerian perspective, Volume 1, Number 1, Port Harcourt Bar Journal, December 2004
- Women's Rights under the Nigerian Criminal Law, a monograph. 2003
- Genderizing the 1999 Constitution, accepted for publication, Journal of Public Law, RSUST Vol. 2 2003
- Case Review; State vs. Cornelius Obasi (1998) 9 NWLR, (part 567) 686, the Nigerian Law and Practice Journal of the Council of Legal Education,
- The Problems of the Niger Delta as a Human Rights Issue, a paper presented at the conference on the Niger Delta at Port Harcourt, 6–9 December 2000.
- The Legal Regime of the Local Government System in Nigeria, University of Calabar Law Journal, 2001.
- Briggs, Onimim; Ojukwu, Chudi Nelson; Idornigie, Paul (2003). Reform and review of gender-biased sexual offences laws in Nigeria. Lagos: Nayee. ISBN 9789783556140.
- Jacks, Onimim E. (2022). "Artificial Intelligence and the Lawyer" (PDF). Empower. FIDA Rivers: 21–23.

== See also ==
- List of people from Rivers State
- Rivers State Ministry of Agriculture
- Customary Court of Appeal
