= Rivers State Ministry of Social Welfare and Rehabilitation =

Government ministry of Rivers State, Nigeria

Ministry overview
- Formed: 23 July 2007
- Jurisdiction: Government of Rivers State
- Headquarters: 6th Floor, Podium Block, State Secretariat; Port Harcourt, Rivers State, Nigeria; 4°46′31″N 7°0′53″E
- Ministry executives: Mr. Ilamusikami Arugu, Commissioner; Dr. Justina Jumbo permanent secretary, Permanent Secretary

The Rivers State Ministry of Social Welfare and Rehabilitation is a government ministry of Rivers State, Nigeria entrusted with the implementation of programs and the provision of social, rehabilitative services to improve the physical, social, emotional and economic well-being of the disadvantaged groups in the state. The ministry is currently headed by Commissioner of Social Welfare and Rehabilitation Mr. Ilamusikami Arugu

The ministry's vision is to achieve a society where everyone is capable of functioning and achieving practical opportunities in the face of disadvantages.

Its departments are:

- Social Welfare
- Rehabilitation
- Child Welfare
- Administration
- Finance and Accounts
- Planning, Research and Statistics

The ministry has zonal offices in Abua Odual, Ahaoda East, Bonny, Bori, Degema, Eleme, Ikwerre, Ohio Akkor, Okehi, Opobo, Sokana, Oba/Egbema/Ndoni, and Okrika.

== See also ==
- List of government ministries of Rivers State
