= Government Secondary School, Eneka =

Government educational institute in Nigeria

Government Secondary School Eneka
- Rivers State; Nigeria

Information
- School type: Secondary School
- Established: 1977
- Founder: Uchendu Achu
- Category: List of Schools in Port harcourt

Government Secondary School, Eneka (GSS) is a coeducational public high school in Rivers State, Nigeria. It is located within Eneka, a town in the Obio-Akpor local government area. The school began operations in 1977 under founding principal Uchendu Achi. Its alumni include professionals medicine, engineering, law, etc.

== Notable alumni ==
- Worgu Boms, lawyer
- Ezenwo Nyesom Wike, current Governor of Rivers State

== See also ==
- List of schools in Port Harcourt
