= Sam Ledor =

Nigerian footballer

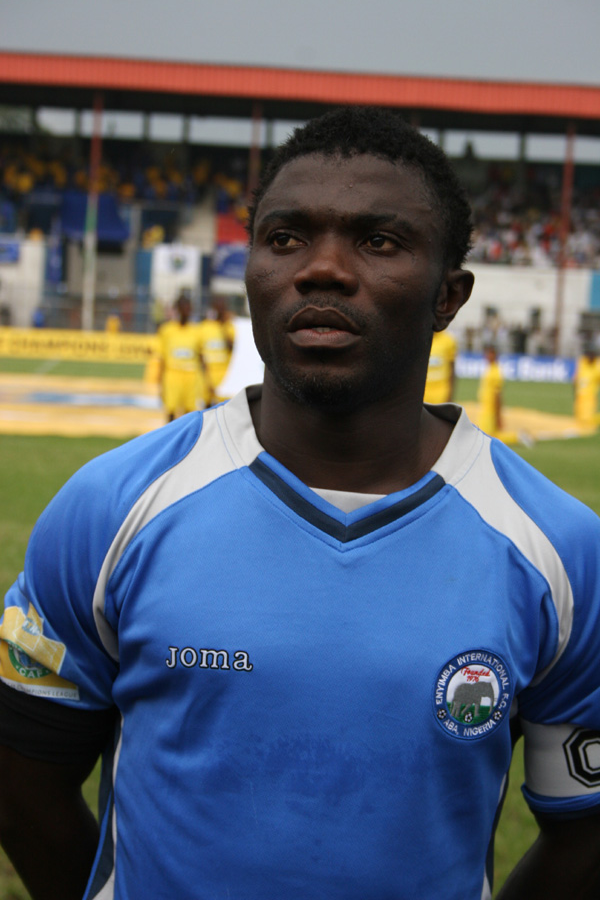

Personal information
- Full name: Samuel Ledor
- Date of birth: December 15, 1986 (age 39)
- Place of birth: Nigeria
- Height: 1.71 m (5 ft 7 in)
- Position: Midfielder

Team information
- Current team: Sharks of Port Harcourt
- Number: 8

Senior career*
Years	Team	Apps	(Gls)
2003 – 2005	Enugu Rangers		
2006 – 2009	Enyimba International F.C.		
2010	Lobi Stars F.C.		
2010	→ Gateway F.C. (loan)		
2010–2011	St. Michel de Ouenze		
2011	ES Sahel		
2012–present	Sharks of Port Harcourt		

International career
2005	Nigeria	1	(0)
- * Club domestic league appearances and goals

Samuel Ledor (born December 15, 1986 in Rivers State) is a Nigerian football player currently with Lobi Stars F.C.

== Career ==
Ledor began his career with Enugu Rangers and joined in 2005 to Enyimba International F.C. After four years left Enyimba and joined in March 2010 on loan to Gateway F.C. After a short term with Gateway on loan was signed in September of the same year by Republic of the Congo side Saint-Michel d'Ouenzé. In September 2011 would sign with Etoile de Sahel, but the transfer collapsed. On 10 January 2012 signed a one-year contract for Sharks F.C.
