= Marquette University College of Health Sciences =

Catholic college in Milwaukee, Wisconsin, US

Coordinates: 43.037744°N 87.932146°W

- Type: Private
- Affiliations: Catholic, Jesuit
- Dean: Dr. William E. Cullinan
- Location: Milwaukee, WI, United States
- Campus: Urban
- Website: marquette.edu/chs

The Marquette University College of Health Sciences is one of the primary colleges at Marquette University, located in Milwaukee, Wisconsin. The college oversees curricula related to the research and medical treatment of the human body.

== Academics ==
The college oversees the curriculum and instruction in all of the health science-related majors offered by the university, with the exception of clinical psychology, dentistry and nursing, each of which fall under separate schools.

=== Programs ===
The College of Health Sciences offers Bachelor's, Master's, Ph.D. and clinical Doctorate degrees across various majors. Within the college are seven separate departments:

- Athletic Training
- Biomedical Sciences
- Clinical Laboratory Sciences
- Exercise Science
- Physical Therapy
- Physician Assistant Studies
- Speech Pathology and Audiology

Physical Therapy is offered only as a doctoral program, leading to Doctorate of Physical Therapy awards. Similarly, Physician Assistant Studies lead only to the Master of Physician Assistant Studies degree.

=== Accreditation ===
Departments in the college are accredited by a corresponding accrediting body. For example, the Athletic Training department received full re-accreditation from the Commission on Accreditation of Athletic Training Education through 2020. Other departments have received their respective notifications of accreditation from the Accreditation Review Commission on Education for the Physician Assistant, the Commission on Accreditation in Physical Therapy Education, the National Accrediting Agency for Clinical Laboratory Sciences, the Council of Academic Accreditation of the American Speech-Language Hearing Association and others.

=== Rankings ===
In 2012, U.S. News & World Report ranked Marquette's physical therapy program at 12th among all programs nationwide. In the same set of rankings, the college's physician assistant studies offerings were ranked 43rd while speech pathology and audiology program came in at 62nd.

== See also ==
- Medical College of Wisconsin
