= Chinyere Igwe =

Nigerian politician (born 1965)

Rivers State Urban Development Commissioner
- Incumbent
- Assumed office 18 December 2015
- Governor: Ezenwo Nyesom Wike
- Preceded by: Ginah Osima

Member of the House of Representatives of Nigeria
- In office 2007–2011
- Preceded by: Austin Opara
- Succeeded by: Blessing Nsiegbe
- Constituency: Port Harcourt II

Personal details
- Born: 18 September 1965 (age 60) Rivers State, Nigeria
- Party: PDP
- Profession: politician

Chinyere Emmanuel Igwe (born 18 September 1965) is a politician of the People's Democratic Party from Rivers State, Nigeria. He is the current Commissioner of Urban Development, having been sworn in on 18 December 2015. He is also a former member of the House of Representatives of Nigeria from Port Harcourt II, serving from 2007 to 2011.

== Arrest ==
A day before the 2023 Nigerian Presidential election, Chinyere Igwe, who is a member of the House of Representative, was arrested. Igwe was stopped by police on allegations of money laundering. Igwe was arrested in his car close to INEC Headquarters Aba Road on Friday 24 February 2023 at about 2:45am.

Igwe was found with almost 500,000 USD, the equivalent of over 200,000,000 Nigerian Naira. Igwe also found with a list of people, with police accusing the minister of attempting to buy votes.
