= Rivers State Ministry of Commerce and Industry =

Ministry overview
- Jurisdiction: Government of Rivers State
- Headquarters: 5th Floor, State Secretariat; Port Harcourt, Rivers State, Nigeria; 4°46′22″N 7°1′1″E
- Ministry executives: Chukwuma Chinye, Commissioner; Kadilo Brown, Permanent Secretary

The Rivers State Ministry of Commerce and Industry is a government ministry of Rivers State, Nigeria that is charged with the responsibility of dealing with matters that have to do with commerce, industry and cooperative, as well as to accelerate the economic and commercial development of the state. The ministry is led by its Commissioner, Chukwuma Chinye, who is assisted by Permanent Secretary Kadilo Brown. The official headquarters of the ministry are at State Secretariat, Port Harcourt.

== See also ==
- List of government ministries of Rivers State
- Government of Rivers State
