= Tasie Wike =

Nigerian lawyer

Tasie Cyprian Wike was a Nigerian lawyer who, as of 2014, was Chairman of the Rivers State College of Health Science and Technology (RSCHST). His appointment to the office was made by Governor Chibuike Amaechi whose tenure expired on 29 May 2015.

Wike was the leader of the Rumuepirikom All Progressives Congress before he defected to the People's Democratic Party (PDP). He was also a cousin of the former Governor of Rivers State Ezenwo Nyesom Wike.

== See also ==
- List of people from Rivers State
