= Rivers State Ministry of Water Resources and Rural Development =

Nigerian state government ministry

Ministry overview
- Formed: 1995
- Jurisdiction: Government of Rivers State
- Headquarters: 8th Floor, State Secretariat; Port Harcourt, Rivers State, Nigeria; 4°46′22″N 7°1′0″E
- Ministry executives: Kaniye Ebeku, Hon. Commissioner; Paulinus E. Nwankwoala (Ph.D), Permanent Secretary
- Child agencies: Port Harcourt Water Corporation (PHWC); Rural Water Supply and Sanitation Agency (RUWASSA); Rivers State Small Towns Water Supply and Sanitation Agency (RSSTOWA); Rivers State Water and Sanitation Regulatory Commission (RSWSRC)
- Website: riversstate-mwrrd.com

The Rivers State Ministry of Water Resources and Rural Development (RSMWRRD) is a government ministry of Rivers State, Nigeria entrusted with the management of water resources and promotion of socio-economic development of rural areas in the state. The ministry was formed in 1995 and has its current headquarters in the city of Port Harcourt. According to its website, the ministry's mission is "to develop and manage sustainable water for people in line with the MDG goal of 100L per day per person for food (agriculture and fisheries), and for industry in Rivers State."

== Mandate ==
To formulate water resource policies and monitor the implementation of such policies in the state.

To source, analyse, store and disseminate information on the water resource data in the state.

To establish, monitor and oversee water parastatals of the ministry – the Rivers State Water Board and the Rural Water and Sanitation Agency.

To initiate and implement water supply projects in all areas of the state.

To liaise with the federal government and international donor agencies on water supply and development for the benefit of the state.

To set standards, regulate, supervise and control the use of all water resources in the state.

Implementing and provision of water legislation/ by-laws.

Collection and evaluation of hydrological and sociological data.

== Departments ==
The Ministry of Water Resources and Rural Development is structured into the following departments:

- Rural Development
- Planning Research and Statistics
- Finance and Accounting
- Water Supply and Quality Control
- Hydrology and Hydrogeology
- Dams and Reservoirs
- Administration

== List of commissioners ==
- Ibibia Walter (2015–2017)
- Kaniye Ebeku (2017-2019)
- Tamunosisi Gogo Jaja (2020-2022)
- Kaniye Ebeku (2022 - Date)

== See also ==
- List of government ministries of Rivers State
- Port Harcourt Water Corporation PHWC
