= Bureau of Public Service Reforms =

Nigerian government agency

Agency overview
- Formed: February 4, 2004
- Jurisdiction: Federal Government of Nigeria
- Headquarters: Abuja, Nigeria
- Agency executive: Dasuki Ibrahim Arabi, Director General
- Parent agency: Presidency of Nigeria
- Website: bpsr.gov.ng

The Bureau of Public Service Reforms (BPSR) is a federal agency in Nigeria, established on February 4, 2004, to enhance public service efficiency, transparency, and governance through coordinated reforms across ministries and agencies.

== History of the Bureau ==
The Bureau for Public Service Reform (BPSR) was established in 1999 during President Olusegun Obasanjo's administration as part of a broader initiative to revitalize the Nigerian Public Service. The Bureau was formed in response to the growing inefficiencies within the Nigerian bureaucracy, including poor staff morale, low productivity, and a lack of proper incentives for public servants. This period also attempted to address the progressive decay observed in the public service during the oil boom era (1970s-1990s).

The key goals of the BPSR were to streamline the public service, set minimum standards for staff strength, and implement remuneration reforms to attract and retain quality staff. The Bureau was instrumental in introducing major reforms such as monetizing fringe benefits, the contributory pension scheme, Service Compact with All Nigerians, and remuneration reforms. These reforms were intended to motivate civil servants, improve the efficiency of government operations, and prepare the public service for long-term sustainability.

The establishment of the BPSR also marked a shift toward ensuring that the Nigerian Public Service could meet citizens' evolving demands. It focused on capacity building, performance improvement, and clear incentives for civil servants. Despite facing significant challenges, including resistance to change and a history of failed reforms, the BPSR's initiatives remain crucial components of Nigeria's public service reform agenda. The agenda addresses systemic inefficiencies and fosters a work environment that encourages individual and institutional development.

=== Constitution and Legal Framework ===
- Decree 25 of 1999: President Olusegun Obasanjo signed Decree No. 25 of 1999, formally establishing the BPSR. This decree outlined the bureau's establishment, mandate, and responsibilities, positioning it as a key institution in driving public service reforms in Nigeria. The decree granted the BPSR legal authority to initiate, monitor, and oversee reforms within the civil service, ensuring that the country's public sector operated more efficiently, transparently, and according to international standards.
- Functions and Powers under the Decree: The BPSR's legal mandate under Decree 25 included the authority to oversee the restructuring of government ministries, departments, and agencies (MDAs) to promote efficiency and accountability. The decree empowered the Bureau to assess the performance of public service institutions, propose reforms, and evaluate the implementation of reform policies across federal government agencies.
- Relationship with Other Government Bodies: The decree also established the BPSR's role in coordinating with other government institutions involved in public service reforms, including the Public Service Commission and the Office of the Head of Civil Service of the Federation. This coordination was essential to ensuring that reforms were effectively integrated across all branches of government.

== Mandate ==
The agency has the primary mandate to provide leadership in developing and implementing public service reforms to improve Nigeria. Its key responsibilities include:

- Provision of Public Service Reform Implementation: The Bureau initiates, coordinates, and oversees the implementation of comprehensive reforms within the public sector, ensuring they align with national development objectives and contribute to effective governance.
- Provision Institutional Capacity Building: A key aspect of BPSR's mandate is to build institutional capacity for government agencies, fostering continuous learning, professional development, and innovation across the public service.
- Provision Improved Service Delivery: The Bureau works to provide better service delivery to citizens through programs like Servicom (Service Compact with All Nigerians), ensuring responsiveness and efficiency in public service operations.
- Provision of Performance Management Systems: BPSR is responsible for delivering robust systems to measure and manage the performance of public servants and government agencies, ensuring alignment with established targets and improving government efficiency overall.
- Providing Workforce Management Solutions: The Bureau plays a central role in delivering workforce management solutions, including recruitment, placement, and retention strategies that enhance the performance of public-sector employees.
- Providing Advisory Services: BPSR delivers expert advice to the government on matters related to public service, recommending best practices and strategies for tackling challenges within the public sector.
- Monitoring and Evaluation: The Bureau effectively monitors and evaluates public service reforms, tracking their impact and ensuring they meet their intended objectives.
- Providing Ethical Standards and Integrity: A key part of the Bureau's mandate is to provide leadership in promoting ethical standards, integrity, and accountability within the public service while eliminating corruption

== Leadership ==
The agency is led by a Director-General, appointed by the President, who oversees the Bureau's operations and ensures the alignment of reform initiatives with national goals. The Executive Management, comprising Deputy Directors-General and departmental heads, manages specific functions such as policy analysis, monitoring, and training. A board consisting of senior government officials provides strategic oversight and guidance. The Bureau's organizational structure also includes specialized units like Reform Coordination and Monitoring, Policy and Research, Public Service Training and Development, and Monitoring and Evaluation, with regional and state offices assisting in implementing reforms at local levels.

== See also ==
- Federal Ministry of Communications, Innovation and Digital Economy
- Nigerian Communications Commission
- Federal Government of Nigeria
- Federal Ministry of Information and National Orientation
