= Rivers State Ministry of Power =

Ministry overview
- Formed: 1999
- Jurisdiction: Government of Rivers State
- Headquarters: 14th Floor, Wing B, State Secretariat; Port Harcourt, Rivers State, Nigeria; 4°46′31″N 7°0′53″E
- Ministry executive: Augustine Wokocha, Commissioner

The Rivers State Ministry of Power is a government ministry of Rivers State, Nigeria created in July 1999 to serve as the policy-formulating and implementing body for the state's electrical energy and power sector. The ministry's mission is to "ensure that Rivers State meets its energy needs through a sustainable framework that will support the state’s economic growth and provide its citizenry with services that meets their expectations as a fast growing economy". The ministry is headed by the Commissioner of Power, currently Augustine Wokocha.

== Mandate ==
The mandate of the Ministry of Power is: "Create an enabling environment for rapid industrial and economic regeneration through quality and uninterrupted electricity supply."

== Objectives ==
1. To ensure that the state's investments in the power industry provide value added services to make life better for residents of the state.
2. To provide a new environment that is sufficiently flexible to take into account new trends in the power sector in Nigeria.
3. To ensure that electricity supply is made more reliable and economically efficient so as to effectively support the socio-economic developments of the state
4. To provide access to sustainable electricity supply in all parts of the state not necessarily through the Grid on the short-run.
5. To establish and meet aggressive targets for a rural electrification program in the State.
6. Finally to create an enabling environment including the provision or incentives that will attract investors and resources to achieve the objectives earlier stated.

== See also ==
- List of government ministries of Rivers State
