= John Ikuru =

John Ikuru (1877–1947) was the son of king Ikuru Efuya, founder of Ikuru Town and Madam Obiringene of Opobo; his mother came from Ekede. He was born in 1877 in Ikuru Town, and had his primary school education at St. Paul's School, Opobo/Nkoro, from 1887 to 1895, and secondary school education at the Wesley Boys’ High School, in Lagos. At that time, Christianity was already sweeping through the entire Western Region of now Nigeria and the Niger Delta, through the evangelistic activities of the Church Missionary Society with Bishop Ajayi Crowther as the pioneer Missionary. So, trained in Lagos, John Ikuru embraced Christianity and became exposed to Christian ethics and philosophy.

In 1900 his father, King Ikuru Efuya, died, and it became obvious that John Ikuru would be the next Okama (Ruler) of Ikuru Town, Andoni. That came true in 1904 when he was invited to return and rule his people. Also in 1904, the British conducted a Punitive Expedition against the still-heathern Obolo people and Yok- Obolo at Alabie (Agwut-Obolo) because of their aggression against other groups in the area heathenism. The British destroyed their House of Skulls and the Shrine of Yok-Obolo in 1904, and split Andoni into six parts, each attached to one of the six Native Courts in the Niger Delta. Ikuru Town was attached to Opobo Town Native Court and Alabie (Agwut Obolo) to Bonny Native Court. M. D. W. Jeffrey said that the purpose of doing this was to destroy Andoni as a political entity.

When John Ikuru returned from Lagos to Ikuru Town in 1904. Evidently, he had a herculean task in his hands. He came back with a ‘Bible’ in one hand, and “chalk” in the other. His father was a rich trader and had laid a solid foundation for him. Soon, he was able to build a palace in Ikuru Town from where he started his evangelistic work. He produced a small group of followers whom he sent out to the other villages to Christianize them and initiate some rudimentary education in such places: To Okoroete, he sent Ralph O. Ikuru To Ngo, he sent Sylvanus Ikuru To Ebukuma, he sent James Accra To Oronija, he sent Samuel Ikuru To Akaradi, he sent George Ekprikpo; and To Ataba, he sent Julius Urombo5 These young men revolutionized not only ecclesiasticism in these places, but also education.

John Ikuru was made a Warrant Chief by the Colonial Administration and attached to the Opobo Native Court. In 1913 he was able to prevail on the Colonial Administration to open a Court in Obolo (Andoni) as the people were now Christians. Existing Records claimed that at that point it was the only such Native Court in the Federation. Very soon he and Chief Ereforokuma were able to take legal action against the Opobo for violating the Obolo-Opobo Treaty of 1869, when they started migrating to other Obolo land not given to them in 1869. Unfortunately, because of leadership problems between him and Chief Ereforokima, the Colonial Administration closed down the Court in 1922 and transferred the case to the 6 Calabar branch of the Supreme Court. In 1925–26, the Supreme Court passed judgment, granting the Obolo (Andoni) their requests.

First, the “Andoni Mainland” remained exclusive to the Obolo (Andoni) people. Also the tribute payable to Yok-Obolo by King Jaja had its name changed to “Customary gifts,” and Opobo Town was given three islands instead of one which was given to Jaja in 1869, and Nkoro was given one island exclusive to them.

The Colonial Administration, particularly M. D. W. Jeffrey's, had observed that through the Oru, they the Obolo (Andoni) could administer themselves and therefore approved the granting of a Native Court. It was established in 1930, at Agafor, with Ralph O. Ikuru as the Scribe. From then, the Obolo (Andoni), not only unified their segments, scattered all over the Niger Delta, but started ruling themselves. In all these, John Ikuru was instrumental and pushed Obolo (Andoni) forward as a member of the Oru.

By 1930, John Ikuru had opened the main Church building, St. Simon's Anglican Church, in Ikuru Town, whose foundation stone was laid by Bishop A. M. Gelsthorpe on February 22, 1937; it became the ecclesiastical headquarters of Obolo (Andoni).

Ikuru was a Knight of the Order of St. Christopher (KSC) awarded posthumously. Economically, King (Sir) John Ikuru was a wealthy palm oil merchant, with trading posts in Ekpirikpe, Azumini, Uruafoug, Ndiya and Ekpenukpa in Ibibio land in present-day Akwa-Ibom State of Nigeria. He came to be regarded as the symbol of light and enlightenment in Obolo (Andoni) history. This is not only in terms of the spread of the gospel in the area, but also in terms of the spread of education in the area. As the only person in the area with secondary school education at that time – he was very close to the British Colonial Administrators in Opobo Division of Calabar Province, where Andoni was.

Apart from M. D. W. Jeffrey, John Ikuru was virtually the “Voice of Obolo” and the source of the coming to Obolo (Andoni) of the Native Court in 1930. John Ikuru died in 1947, after having trained a large number of clerics and secondary school leavers. Also, he was married with many children.

== See also ==
- The Obolo (Andoni) People
- Rivers State Nigeria
- Niger Delta
