= Rivers State Ministry of Energy and Natural Resources =

Ministry overview
- Formed: 2003
- Jurisdiction: Government of Rivers State
- Headquarters: 13th Floor, Point Block, State Secretariat; Port Harcourt, Rivers State, Nigeria; 4°46′21″N 7°1′1″E
- Ministry executive: Uchechukwu Nwafor, Commissioner

The Rivers State Ministry of Energy and Natural Resources is a government ministry of Rivers State, Nigeria in charge of monitoring, controlling, and regulating activities related to energy and natural resources in the state. The mandate of the ministry is "To meet the energy needs of the Rivers State population and maximize their participation in the upstream/downstream sectors." The current commissioner is Uchechukwu Nwafor. Ministry headquarters are located at State Secretariat building, Port Harcourt.

== Structure ==
The ministry consists of the following departments:

- Natural Gas
- Petroleum
- Conflict Resolution
- Research and Statistics
- Administration
- Department of Finance and Accounts.

== See also ==
- List of government ministries of Rivers State
