= Rivers State Ministry of Urban Development =

Ministry overview
- Formed: December 2007
- Jurisdiction: Government of Rivers State
- Headquarters: Block B, 7th Floor, State Secretariat; Port Harcourt, Rivers State, Nigeria; 4°46′24″N 7°0′57″E
- Ministry executive: Chinyere Igwe, Commissioner

The Rivers State Ministry of Urban Development is a ministry of the Government of Rivers State entrusted with the task of reviewing and preparing physical development, urban renewal and transportation plans. The ministry is also in charge of urban reorientation and enforcement, regional rural planning, land provision and the approval of building plans. The Ministry is headed by the Commissioner of Urban Development, currently Hon. Chinyere Igwe. The headquarters of the ministry are located in the State Secretariat building, Port Harcourt, Rivers State's capital and largest city.

== Function ==
The ministry has the following functions:

Administration of physical, development control, regional/rural planning and urban re-orientation/urban renewal departments.

- General development for physical planning and central policies for the State.
- Preparation and review of physical development plans (master plans) and development control laws and regulations.
- Liaise with LGA on physical planning and development issues.
- Enforcement of physical planning and development control laws and regulations.

== List of commissioners ==
- Isobo Jack
- Chinyere Igwe

== See also ==
- Government of Rivers State
