= Isobo Jack =

Nigerian politician and businessman

Isobo Jack (born 1964) is a Nigerian businessman and politician from Rivers State. He is a member of the All Progressives Congress (APC) and belongs to the Kalabari ethnic group. He previously served as the caretaker chairman of the Akuku-Toru Local Government Area between December 2007 and April 2008.

== Career ==
Jack served as the chairman of the Rivers State Environmental Sanitation Authority from 2011 to 2012. He has also held positions as the Rivers State Commissioner of Urban Development and served as a Special Adviser on Waste Management to Governor Rotimi Amaechi.
