= Rosemund Dienye Green-Osahogulu =

Vice-Chancellor in Nigeria

- Born: 12 April 1956 (age 70); Kingdom of Bonny

Rosemund Dienye Green-Osahogulu (born 12 April 1956) is a Vice-Chancellor of Ignatius Ajuru University of Education that is based in Rumuolumeni Port Harcourt, Rivers State in Nigeria.

Green-Osahogulu was born in the Kingdom of Bonny in 1956. She was the first Vice-Chancellor of Ignatius Ajuru University of Education that is based in Rumuolumeni Port Harcourt, Rivers State in Nigeria. Her appointment was made by the state governor Chibuike Rotimi Amaechi in October 2013.

In 2018 she published an account of how she had been kidnapped and tortured by a band who were demanding that she paid them money from the university's account.
