= Otonti Amadi Nduka =

Nigerian academic (born 1926)

- Born: Otonti Amadi Nduka; 9 May 1926 (age 100); River State
- Citizenship: Nigerian
- Occupation: Lecturer
- Spouse: Pamela Nduka

Otonti Amadi Nduka (born 9 May 1926) is a Nigerian educationalist and Ikwerre ethnic nationality spokesman. He is married to Pamela Nduka and together they have five children. Otonti and his wife are still currently residing in Nigeria. They celebrated their diamond wedding anniversary in 2018.

Nduka is a retired professor and Dean of Education at the University of Port Harcourt, and a Fellow and Vice President of Nigerian Academy of Education. He also is considered a Chief by people in his village, as was evident at his 80th birthday celebrations with the many people gathering to celebrate the event and honour his work. A few days before his 80th birthday was the release of another of his books, The Roots of African Underdevelopment, the launch being held at the University of Port Harcourt.

He turned 100 on 9 May 2026.

== Bibliography ==
- Western Education and Nigerian Cultural Background (1964), Ibadan: Oxford University Press. OCLC 176485
- Philosophy of Education – A Missing Link in the Academic Training of Nigerian Teachers in Yoloye, E. A., and Nwosu, S. N. (eds), Foundations of African Education, Volume 1 (1975), Accra Western Council of the Association for Teacher Education in Africa Originally Published in Proceedings of the Conference on High Level Teacher Training (1970), Lagos: Federal Ministry of Information
- A Review of Educational Developments in Federal Republic of Nigeria in 1975 in Oyediran, O. (ed.): Survey of Nigerian Affairs 1975, Ibadan: Oxford University Press
- Educational Development in Port Harcourt: Retrospect and Prospects, in Ogionwo, W. (ed.), The City of Port Harcourt: Symposium on Its Growth and Development (1979), Ibadan: Heinemann
- With Iheoma, O.A. (eds) New Perspectives in Moral Education, (1983) Evans Brothers (Nig) Ltd. ISBN 978-167-227-7
- Studies in Ikwerre History and Culture (1993), Ibadan: Kraft Books. ISBN 978-2081-30-2
- The Roots of African Underdevelopment (2006), Ibadan: Spectrum Books.
