= Mercy Health Sciences University =

Catholic college in Des Moines, Iowa, US

Coordinates: 41.5943°N 93.6263°W

- Former names: Mercy Des Moines School of Nursing (1899–1994); Mercy School of Health Sciences (1994–1995); Mercy College of Health Sciences (1994–2026)
- Type: Private college
- Established: 1899
- Religious affiliation: Roman Catholic
- Academic affiliations: ACCU, NAICU
- President: Adreain Henry
- Undergraduates: 869
- Location: Des Moines, Iowa, United States
- Campus: Urban
- Website: www.mercyhealthu.edu

Mercy Health Sciences University is a private Catholic college focused on healthcare and located in Des Moines, Iowa, United States. Established by the Sisters of Mercy in 1899, Mercy College offers master’s, bachelor's, and associate degrees, as well as certificate programs in the health sciences.

== History ==
In 1893, three sisters from Mercy Hospital in Davenport, Iowa, founded a hospital in Des Moines. Their first location was Hoyt Sherman Place and in 1899 Mercy Hospital Training School was established. This evolved into Mercy School of Health Sciences, from which Mercy College of Health Sciences was established in downtown Des Moines in 1995. On September 15, 2026, the name of the institution changed to Mercy Health Sciences University.

== Accreditation ==
Mercy College of Health Sciences is accredited by the Higher Learning Commission.
