= Rivers State Agricultural Development Programme =

Agricultural Development Programme in Rivers

Agency overview
- Formed: 1988
- Jurisdiction: Government of Rivers State
- Headquarters: Port Harcourt, Rivers State
- Parent department: Ministry of Agriculture

The Rivers State Agricultural Development Programme is a government parastatal within the Ministry of Agriculture. It was established under the Law on the Agricultural Development Programme of Rivers State 1988. Its functions include formulating and implementing programmes relating to Agriculture as well as providing extension services to farmers in both rural and urban areas of the state.

== Responsibilities ==
The Agricultural Development Programme has the following responsibilities:

1. Increasing food and tree crops, livestock and fisheries production of the small scale farmer and fishermen in Rivers State and consequently to raise their incomes.
2. Streamlining the extension services and the inputs to improve networks of rural roads.
3. Providing safe portable water supply to the rural population
4. Enhancing the capacity of the state to plan and implement similar programmes in the future.

== Projects ==
- National Programme on Food Security (NPFS)
- Root and Tuber Expansion Programme(RTEP)
- Pre-Emptive management of Cassava Mosaic Disease (CMD)
- Community - Based Natural Resources Management Programme (CBNRMP)
- National Fadama Development Programme (FADAMAIII)

== See also ==
- List of government agencies of Rivers State
