= Rivers State Ministry of Agriculture =

Government agency that deals with agriculture

Ministry overview
- Jurisdiction: Government of Rivers State
- Headquarters: 6th Floor, State Secretariat; Port Harcourt, Rivers State, Nigeria; 4°46′24″N 7°0′57″E
- Ministry executives: Onimim Jacks, Commissioner; Otonyetarie Okoye, Permanent Secretary; Comfort Monima Daddy-West, Director of Agriculture
- Website: www.rsmoa.gov.ng

The Rivers State Ministry of Agriculture is a ministry of the Government of Rivers State charged with regulation and formulation of policies related to the agricultural sector of the state with aim to secure food, improve the economy of the rural areas and protect the environment. Rivers State is one of the county's leading agricultural-producing states. The ministry is located at 6th Floor, State Secretariat, Port Harcourt.

== Departments ==
- Fisheries
- Forestry
- Veterinary and Livestock

== Parastatals ==
- Agricultural Development Programme (ADP)
- Rivers State Agricultural Marketing Company (RIVAMACO)
- Rivers State School-To-Land Authority
- Delta Rubber Company
- RISONPALM

== List of commissioners ==
- 1999: Tele Ikuru
- 2004: Ndubuisi Adikema
- 2007: Chidi Nweke
- 2008: Marshall Stanley Uwom
- 2009: Emmanuel Chinda
- 2015: Onimim Jacks
- 2017: Charles Nwogu
- 2023: Victor Barikpoamene Kii

== See also ==
- Government of Rivers State
- Government ministries of Rivers State
