= Andrea Cossu (footballer, born 1984) =

Nigerian footballer

Personal information
- Full name: Andrea Bright Cossu
- Date of birth: August 15, 1984 (age 42)
- Place of birth: Buguma, Nigeria
- Height: 1.70 m (5 ft 7 in)
- Position: Midfielder

Team information
- Current team: Norcia 480

Youth career
- ?–2004: Ternana
- 2002–2003: → Giulianova (loan)

Senior career*
Years	Team	Apps	(Gls)
2004–2006	Foligno	55	(3)
2006–2010	Triestina	33	(0)
2007–2008	→ Paganese (loan)	28	(0)
2008–2009	→ Virtus Lanciano (loan)	24	(0)
2011–2012	Universitatea Craiova		
2012	Biaschesi		
2013	Ancona		
2017	Norcia 480		
- * Club domestic league appearances and goals

Andrea Bright Cossu (born August 15, 1984) is a Nigerian footballer, who currently plays for Norcia 480 in the Italian Prima Categoria as a midfielder. He also holds Italian citizenship.

== Biography ==
=== Early life ===
Cossu was born in the Nigerian city of Buguma. The Cossu family immigrated 1990 to Italian city Foligno from his native Nigeria.

=== Career ===
Coassu left for Giulianova in 2002–03 season and returned to Ternana in January 2003. In January 2006 he was signed by Triestina. In the 2007–08 season he was loaned to Paganese.

=== Universitatea Craiova ===
In February 2011, Andrea Cossu signed a contract with the Romanian club FC Universitatea Craiova of Liga 1.

== Personal life ==
Andrea's brother, Riccardo, plays currently football for A.C.D. Austis.
