= Coleman College for Health Sciences =

Community college based in Houston, Texas, US

Coordinates: 29.7040°N 95.4050°W

- Type: Public community college
- Established: 2004
- President: Phillip Nicotera
- Location: Houston, Texas, United States
- Website: coleman.hccs.edu

HCC Coleman College for Health Sciences is a community college based in Houston, Texas, which is focused on health sciences. The school is part of the Houston Community College System, and is a member institution of the Texas Medical Center, which is located nearby.
