= Rivers State Ministry of Works =

Government ministry in Nigeria

Ministry overview
- Jurisdiction: Government of Rivers State
- Headquarters: 5th Floor, State Secretariat; Port Harcourt, Rivers State, Nigeria; 4°46′24″N 7°0′57″E
- Ministry executive: Dr. Alabo Dakorinama George-Kelly , Commissioner; Permanent Secretary

The Rivers State Ministry of Works is a ministry of the Government of Rivers State concerned with providing socio-economic infrastructure in Rivers State, Nigeria. It is headquartered in the State Secretariat building in Port Harcourt.

== Functions and responsibilities ==
- Construct and rehabilitate urban road networks.
- Construct rural road networks.
- Maintain urban roads.
- Control flood and erosion.

== List of commissioners ==
- David Briggs (1999–2003)
- Felicity Okpete Ovai (2003–2006)
- Julius Orumbo (2006–2007)
- Dakuku Peterside (2007–2011)
- Victor Giadom (2011-2015)
- Kelvin Wachukwu (2015–2016)
- Harrison B. Iheanyichukwu (2016–2017)
- Dum Dekor (2017–present)

== See also ==
- Government of Rivers State
- Government ministries of Rivers State
