= Attorney General of Rivers State =

The Attorney General of Rivers State is an appointed official in the executive branch of the Government of Rivers State. The Attorney General is appointed by the Governor, with the consent of the Rivers State House of Assembly. The Attorney General serves as the Commissioner of Justice and chief law officer of the state. Some of the duties assigned to this official include supervising the law, administering the state's legal system and advising the government on legal matters.

== Office of the Attorney General ==
The post of the Attorney General is described in Chapter VI, section 195 of the Constitution as follows:

(1)There shall be an Attorney-General for each State who shall be the Chief Law Officer of the State and Commissioner for Justice of the Government of that State. (2) A person shall not be qualified to hold or perform the functions of the office of the Attorney-General of a State unless he is qualified to practise as a legal practitioner in Nigeria and has been so qualified for not less than ten years.

== Role and powers ==
Section 211 of the Constitution provides that "the attorney general of a state shall have power":

1. To institute and undertake criminal proceedings against any person before any court of law in Nigeria other than a court-martial in respect of any offence created by or under any law of the House of Assembly;
2. To take over and continue any such criminal proceedings that may have been instituted by any other authority or person; and
3. To discontinue at any stage before judgement is delivered any such criminal proceedings instituted or undertaken by him or any other authority or person.

== Attorneys General of Rivers State ==
- Adokiye Amiesimaka
- Frank Owhor
- Aleruchi Cookey-Gam
- Henry Ajumogobia
- Okey Wali
- Ken Chikere Esq
- Worgu Boms
- Emmanuel C. Aguma
- Professor Zaccheus Adangor (SAN)
