= Rivers State Ministry of Justice =

Ministry overview
- Jurisdiction: Government of Rivers State
- Headquarters: State Secretariat; Port Harcourt, Rivers State, Nigeria; 4°46′24″N 7°0′57″E
- Ministry executive: Dagogo Israel Iboroma, SAN, Attorney General and Commissioner for Justice

The Rivers State Ministry of Justice is a ministry of the Government of Rivers State responsible for handling and coordinating matters relating to judicial administration. The headquarters of the ministry is located at the State Secretariat in Port Harcourt. The current Attorney-General and Commissioner for Justice is Dagogo Israel Iboroma, SAN, appointed in 2024.

== See also ==
- Government of Rivers State
- Judiciary of Rivers State
