= Rivers State University =

Public university in Port Harcourt, Nigeria

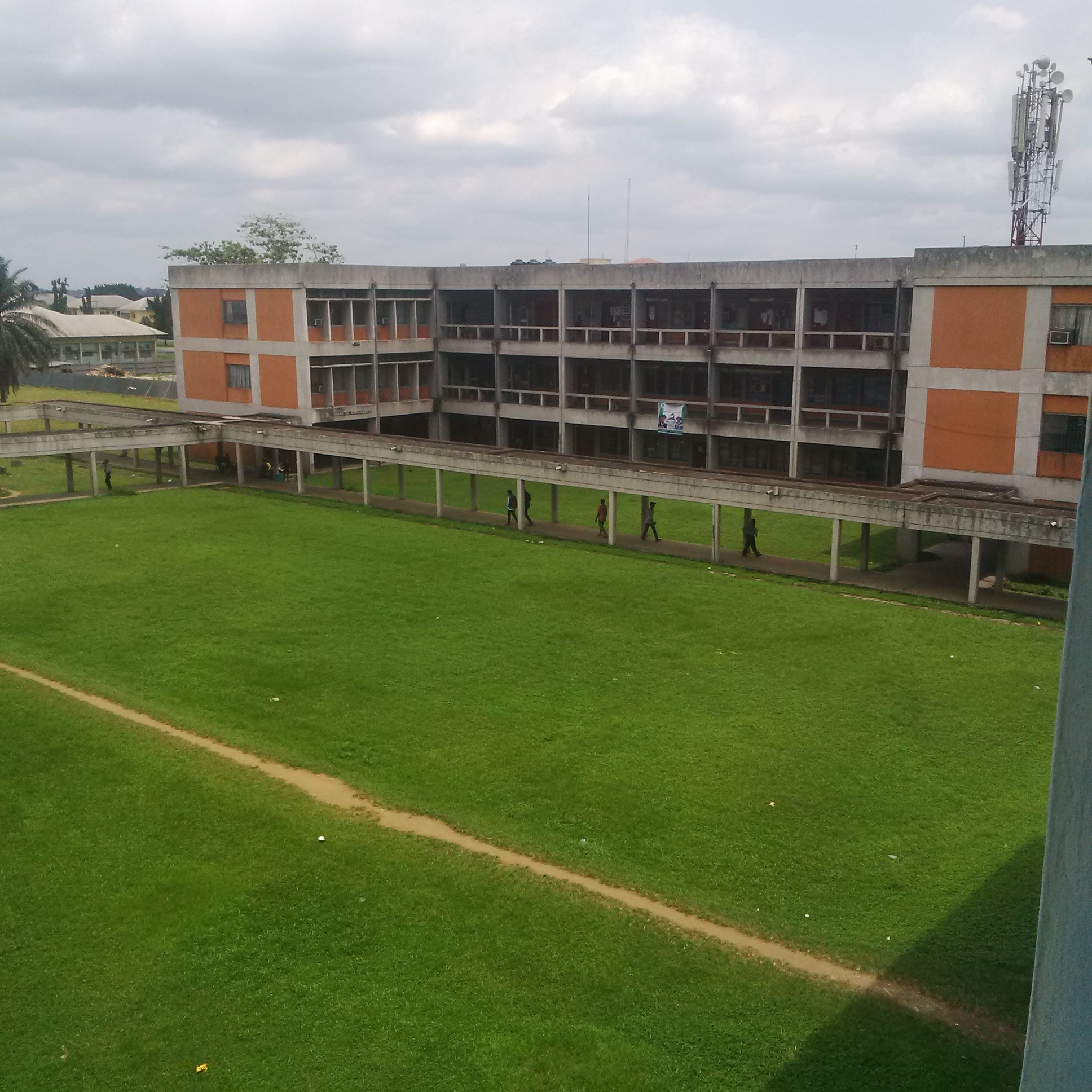
- Faculty of Sciences
- Former names: Rivers State College of Science and Technology (1972–1980); Rivers State University of Science and Technology (1980–2017)
- Motto: Excellence & Creativity
- Type: Public
- Established: 1972 as University college 1980 as University
- Affiliations: ASUU, NUC, ACU
- Chancellor: Sidi M. Bage CON, JSC (rtd)
- Vice-Chancellor: Isaac Zeb-Obipi
- Administrative staff: 3,000
- Location: Port Harcourt, Nigeria
- Campus: Urban
- Colours: Green, dark blue, and white
- Nicknames: RVSU, RSU (formerly RSUST)

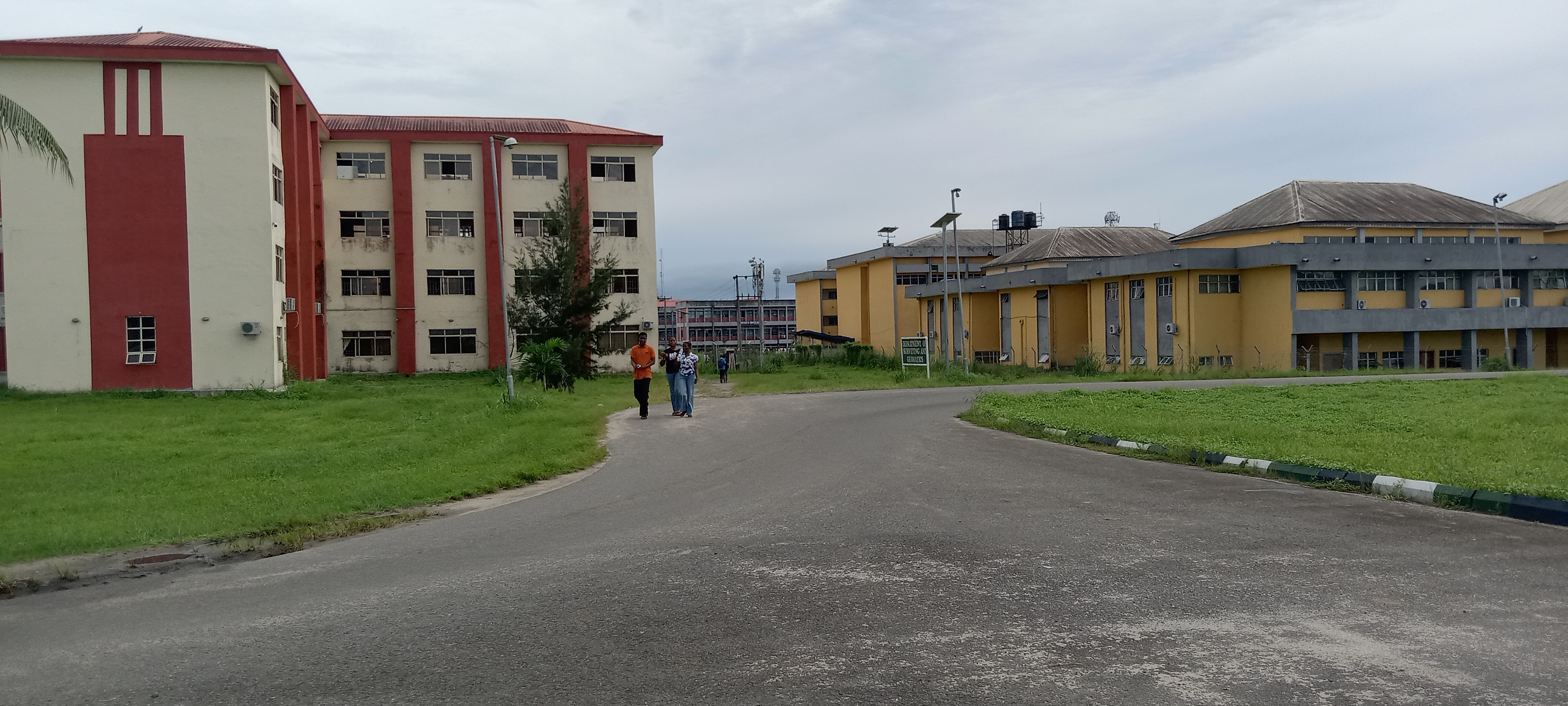
Rivers_State_University_Social_Science_Building

Rivers State University (RIVSU or RSU), formerly known as Rivers State University of Science and Technology (UST or RSUST), is a government-owned university located in Diobu (Mile III) area of Port Harcourt, Rivers State, Southern Nigeria.

As of 2025, the vice chancellor of the university is Professor Isaac Zeb-Obipi. He was appointed by the administration of Governor Siminalayi Fubara in March 2025.

== History ==
The Rivers State University of Science and Technology was established in 1972 as the College of Science and Technology. It was granted independent university status in 1980 and was renamed from College of Science and Technology to Rivers State University of Science and Technology. In March 2017, the university was renamed to Rivers State University. More faculties are being added to the university. RSU is the only university in Nigeria that is accredited to offer degree programs in Marine Engineering.

== Faculties and courses ==
=== Faculty of Sciences ===
- Department of Chemistry
- Department of Biochemistry
- Department of Physics
- Department of Mathematics
- Department of Computer Science
- Department of Biochemistry
- Department of Animal and Environmental Biology
- Department of Microbiology
- Department of Plant Science and Biotechnology
- Department of Geology
- Department of Maritime Science

=== Faculty of Engineering ===
- Department of Civil
  - Highway Engineering
  - Structural Engineering
  - Hydraulics
- Department of Marine Engineering
- Department of Petroleum Engineering
- Department of Mechanical Engineering
- Department of Electrical Engineering
- Department of Chemical/Petrochemical Engineering
- Department of Agricultural and Environmental Engineering
- Department of Computer Engineering

=== Faculty of Law ===
- Department of Business Law
- Department of International Law
- Department of Public Law
- Department of Private and Property Law
- Department of Independent Law and Crime Law

=== Faculty of Management Sciences ===
- Department of Office and Information Management
- Department of Marketing
- Department of Management
- Department of Banking and Finance
- Department of Accountancy
- Department of Business administration
- Department of Employment Relations and Human Resource Management

=== Faculty of Environmental Sciences ===
- Department of Surveying and Geomatics
- Department of Estate Management
- Department of Quantity Surveying
- Department of Architecture
- Department of Urban and Regional Planning

=== Faculty of Agriculture ===
- Department of Forestry and Environment
- Department of Agriculture and Applied Economics
- Department of Agriculture Extension and Rural Development
- Department of Animal Science
- Department of Crop/Soil Science
- Department of Fisheries and Aquatic Environment
- Department of Food Science and Technology
- Department of Home Science and Management

=== Faculty of Education ===
- Department of Adult Education
- Department of Vocational and Technology Education
- Department of Education Management
- Department of Education Foundation
- Department of Business Education
- Department of Science and Technical Education
- Department of Library and Information Science

=== Faculty of Humanities ===
- Department of English and Literary Studies
- Department of History and International Diplomacy
- Department of Theatre Arts and Film Studies
- Department of Philosophy
- Department of Religious Studies

=== Faculty of Social Sciences ===
- Department of Political Science
- Department of Psychology
- Department of Geography
- Department of Economics

=== College of Medical Sciences ===
- Faculty of Basic Medical Sciences
- Faculty of Clinical Sciences
- Nursing

=== Faculty of Communication and Media studies ===
- Department of Communication Studies
- Department of Journalism and Print Technology
- Department of Public Relations and Advertising
- Department of Cinematography and Broadcasting

=== Faculty of Medical Laboratory Science ===
- Department of Clinical Chemistry
- Department of Haematology and Blood Transfusion Science
- Department of Medical Microbiology
- Department of Histopathology and cytology

== Notable alumni ==
- Magnus Ngei Abe, senator of the Federal Republic of Nigeria
- Judith Amaechi, former First Lady of Rivers State
- Nichole Banna, actress and producer
- Tonto Dikeh, actress
- Asari Dokubo, Ijaw activist (left before graduation)
- Siminalayi Fubara, current governor, Rivers State
- Manuela George-Izunwa, politician
- Tele Ikuru, former deputy governor of Rivers State
- Omo Isoken, estate manager and politician
- Austin Opara, former Deputy Speaker, House of Representatives of Nigeria
- Goodluck Nanah Opiah, politician
- Felicity Okpete Ovai, engineer
- Mary Uranta, actress, producer, singer
- Eberechi Wike, judge of the Rivers State High Court of Justice
- Nyesom Wike, former governor of Rivers State
