= The Certificate (album) =

Studio album by Duncan Mighty
- Released: September 15, 2016
- Genre: Hip hop; reggae; Afrobeats; Afro-Pop
- Length: 74:05
- Language: English, Pidgin, Igbo, Ikwerre
- Label: Young Wealth Records
- Producer: Duncan Mighty

Duncan Mighty chronology
Grace & Talent (2014)	The Certificate (2016)	God Made (2021)

The Certificate is the fifth studio album by Nigerian singer Duncan Mighty. It was released on September 15, 2016. The album is a follow-up project to his 2014 album, Grace & Talent (No Man Is Self Made).

== Background ==
The 19-track album has a running time of 74 minutes and it features Timaya on "Owu" and Double Jay on "Kpalele 4 Me". The album is said to contain music that would be used as tools for youth empowerment as well as a vocal piece standing against some social vices and misdemeanors that are gradually taking over the world populace.

== Reception ==
In a review, YNaija posits that The Certificate is made from a formula, and it is the same one that has guided Duncan Mighty to success on previous records; from Koliwater to Legacy, adding that "the songs are catchy, beats are danceable, lyrics are plain and arrangements are simple and melodies are mostly pleasant".

Sunju Abusi of Novice2Star rated the album 4.5, adding that the album is more of an inspirational and dance album, an album with loads of positive messages for the young and old.

Pulse Ng rated the album 3/5, noting that the album is not a "comeback for Duncan Mighty, It's an extension of his whelming influence from the Niger Delta, to the rest of Nigeria."

== Track listing ==
No.	Title	Length
1.	"The Certificate"	1:26
2.	"Mama Born Dem"	4:13
3.	"Hataz"	3:30
4.	"Tinubu"	4:20
5.	"Killing Me Softly"	4:16
6.	"Owu" (featuring Timaya)	3:46
7.	"Kbor 4 Ur Love"	4:09
8.	"Onyinye"	4:29
9.	"All Belongs to You"	5:13
10.	"Finish Work"	3:27
11.	"Oburukwelem Oma"	4:25
12.	"Na Lie"	3:41
13.	"Port Harcourt Girl"	3:32
14.	"DJs Anthem"	3:59
15.	"N Lov wif My Girli"	3:18
16.	"Give Him Praise"	3:44
17.	"Kpalele 4 Me" (featuring Double Jay)	4:42
18.	"Crime Mate"	4:12
19.	"Janimaaah"	3:53
Total length:		77:04

== See also ==
- Music of Port Harcourt
