= Mr 2Kay discography =

- Studio albums: 2
- EPs: 1
- Singles: 16
- Music videos: 17

Nigerian singer Mr 2Kay has released several singles and music videos.

== As lead artist ==
List of singles as lead artist, with selected chart positions and certifications, showing year released and album name
Title	Year	Album
"Run This Town"	2010	Waterside Boy
"Waterside Boy"	2011	Waterside Boy
"Beat For My Heart" (featuring. Hans Mills)	2012	Waterside Boy
"Bubugaga"	2012	"Non-album singles"
"Bubugaga (Remix)" (featuring. May7ven & Moelogo)	2013	"Non-album singles"
"Don't Leave Me" (featuring. Xcellente & Doray)	2013	"Non-album singles"
"Addicted"	2014	"Non-album singles"
"Summer Girl (Samba)"	2014	"Non-album singles"
"Bad Girl Special" (featuring. Patoranking)	2014	"Non-album singles"
"Bad Girl Special UK Remix" (featuring. Patoranking)	2015	"Non-album singles"
"Bad Girl Special (Remix)" (featuring. Cynthia Morgan & Seyi Shay)	2015	Count It All Joy
"Who No Like Better Thing" (featuring. The Jonsers)	2015	Count It All Joy
"Count It All Joy"	2016	Count It All Joy
"Belema"	2017	Elevated
"Pray for Me"	2017	Elevated
"Banging" (featuring. Reekado Banks)	2018	Elevated
"—" denotes a recording that did not chart or was not released in that territory.

== Music videos ==
List of music videos as lead and featured artist, showing year released and directors
Title	Year	Director(s)
"Run This Town"	2011	
"Run This Town (Remix)" (featuring. Duncan Mighty)	2011	
"Waterside Boy"	2012	
"Kosi Were"	2012	Clarence Peters
"Beat For My Heart" (featuring. Hans Mills)	2013	Nosa Igbinedion
"Bubugaga"	2013	Nosa Igbinedion
"Bubugaga (Remix)" (featuring. May7ven & Moelogo)	2013	
"Don't Leave Me" (featuring. Xcellente & Doray)	2014	Adasa Cookey
"Summer Girl (Samba)"	2014	Nosa Igbinedion
"Bad Girl Special" (featuring. Patoranking)	2014	Nosa Igbinedion
"Bad Girl Special Remix" (featuring. Cynthia Morgan & Seyi Shay)	2015	Clarence Peters
"Who No Like Better Thing" (featuring. The Jonsers)	2015	Adasa Cookey
"Count It All Joy"	2017	Clarence Peters
"Belema"	2017	Clarence Peters
"Pray for Me"	2018	Clarence Peters
"Banging" (featuring. Reekado Banks)	2018	Clarence Peters
"God Can Bless Anybody" (featuring. Idahams)	2018	Clarence Peters

== Studio albums ==
List of studio albums, with selected chart positions, sales figures and certifications
Title	Details
Waterside Boy	Released: February 19, 2012; Label: Grafton Records; Formats: CD, digital download
Elevated	Released: February 9, 2018; Label: Grafton Records; Formats: CD, digital download

== Extended plays ==
List of studio albums, with selected chart positions, sales figures and certifications
Title	Details
Count It All Joy	Released: February 15, 2016; Label: Grafton Records; Formats: CD, digital download
Concentrate	Released: December 6, 2019; Label: Better Life Entertainment; Formats: Digital Download
