= Music of Port Harcourt =

Port Harcourt, a city of Rivers State located to the south of Nigeria, has a thriving music scene encompassing both native African and foreign-influenced genres. It plays host to numerous radio stations, prominent recording studios, such as the Street Rhymes Studios and other music institutions. As a state capital, Port Harcourt has one of the liveliest club scenes in the country as well as music venues, bars and restaurants. As of 2015, Hip-hop, pop, highlife and reggae are most popular music styles among young people in the city.

== Notable musicians and record labels ==
Port Harcourt is the birthplace of many locally and internationally admired musicians, including Duncan Mighty, Muma Gee, Timaya, Burna Boy, Duncan Daniels, Omah Lay, Muna, POS, 1da Banton, Ajebo Hustlers, M Trill, Lyrikal, Mr. 2Kay, Waconzy, Mercy Chinwo, Rico Slim, and Idahams. The city is home to NoDo records, Froshboi Media, Empire Dreamin Records 7dnaija record, InterSpace Distribution and Grafton Entertainment, one of Africa's biggest record labels to date. Founded in 2004, Grafton Entertainment has contributed extensively towards the growth of the Port Harcourt music scene from discovering and exposing her best talents to organizing some of the city's groundbreaking concerts. The first signee to the label was Bayelsa duo De Indispensables whose Press on Pt. 2 album in the 2000s put Port Harcourt on the global hip hop map.

== Music festivals ==
More recently, there has been a significant increase in the number of festivals held within the city. Carniriv, a major musical cultural event in Nigeria continues to take place annually since 1988. The state government further recognizes this festival as its biggest tourism export. Aside Nigeria, the Carniriv has featured several famous artists from other countries abroad including the likes of Shaggy, Patra, Beenie Man, Busta Rhymes, Joe, Brick & Lace and Wyclef Jean.

== Venues and organizations ==
Most of the major concerts, festivals and other musical events are held in multi-purpose stadiums such as Liberation Stadium in Elekahia. Opened in 2001, Liberation Stadium has the capacity to seat 30,000 people, only the Adokiye Amiesimaka Stadium is known to be bigger than it. Port Harcourt's nightclubs and public houses are also locations for music activities. Other venues like The Atrium and the Aztech Arcum have hosted several shows for local and mainstream artists.

The Performing Musicians Association of Nigeria Rivers State Branch exists as one of the organizations that promote music profession and oversee the welfare of musicians in the city. It is affiliated with the national Performing Musicians Association of Nigeria (PMAN) which has supported the industry since 1984. Singer Lady IB, as of November 2014, is serving her second term as chairperson. She is the second woman, after Muma Gee, to ascend to that position.

== Early music ==
=== Jazz ===
Maud Meyer, female jazz icon, was born in Port Harcourt. She was among the few women that rose to stardom in the 1950s. As a child, Meyer emulated her mother who was a bandleader. She was a well-known proponent of Billie Holiday. Meyer's voice and ability to expand in the genre were the keys to her success. In the words of Emeka Keazor, "she was one of the greatest female jazz singers of all time."

Throughout her career, Meyer maintained a position as West Africa's foremost. She sold herself on the club circuits while assisting various influential bands. In the late 1980s, Jazz music achieved its commercial peak. A Jazz Festival was duly introduced by Doye Agama in 1985 to hold every year till 1990. During the first three editions which he produced and directed, the event saw a record number of people along with performances from Oliver Jones, Embryo, Dizzy Gillespie and Mike Mower's Itchy Fingers Jazz Saxophone Quartet. These Port Harcourt Festivals were some of the last great gatherings of many other pioneering Nigerian musicians like Art Alade, Eddie Okonta, Zeal Onyia, Remi Kabaka, Steve Rhodes, Tony Benson, Geraldo Pino, Sonny Brown and many others who helped inspire a new generation of jazz aficionados.

== Popular music ==
=== Hip-hop ===
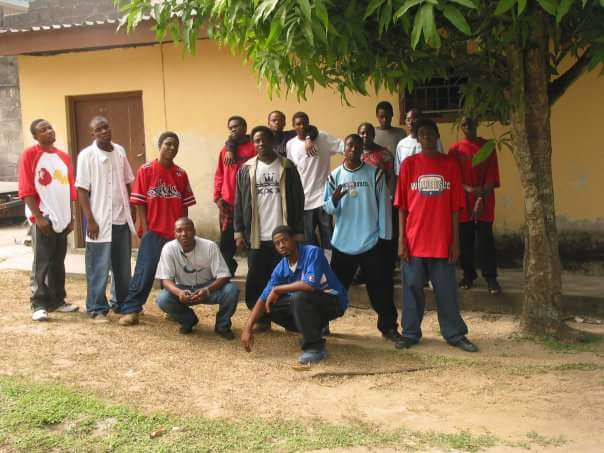
Tuck Tyght Allstars

Beginning in the twenty-first century, the impact of Hip-hop on young Harcourtians in terms of lifestyle, fashion, attitudes and values has reached heights previously unseen. While this transformation remains an intriguing cultural enigma, those involved in the movement consider it profitable. An early example of Port Harcourt hip-hoppers was the Tropical Breed, Specimen A and Tuck Tyght Allstars formed in 2000.

Tropical Breed, a hip-hop duo of LGB and Mack One released a few singles which were the first hip-hop tracks to be aired in Port Harcourt by Rhythm 93.7 FM. These tracks included the club banger "Clubs to the Streets", "PHC", a dedication to Port Harcourt City and the controversial "NEPA", which was a hit track discussing the poor electrical power supply situation in the country. This song would attract a diss record from Lyrikal of Tuck Tyght Allstars, who went on to criticize the Breed's use of Naija Pidgin and not proper English on the track. This, however, prompted Tropical Breed to later release another single "Critics" – with visuals edited by Base One – as a response to the diss song stating how other rappers should mind their own problems and not the next man's.

Tuck Tyght Allstars went on to become a significant group paving the way for further development of the genre. Protagonist Henry Diete Spiff founded Tuck Tyght Records to focus on hardcore, street-oriented hip-hop, at a time when there weren't many supporting or sponsoring it. Tuck Tyght's first release was the group album, Now Official, released in 2003. Featured on the album were Frank D'Nero, Andre Blaze, Double K, Mack Gee, Duncan Daniels, Damage, Lyrikal, M-Lee, Double V and Billy Dolomite. This album was instrumental in helping the artists gained experience in all facets of the industry, ranging from production, mixing, mastering, to distribution.

Lyrikal left the Tuck Tyght after appearing on Now Official. His first ever official single was "Learn Something" in which he took swipes at the Specimen A and Tropical Breed hip-hop groups. Following that he launched a solo career releasing a second single "Can U Relate", where he rapped on issues of socio-political concern. Duncan Daniels, born in Boston, moved to the city as a teenager. He began producing records eventually signing with Tuck Tyght. Though the record label and the all-star group working under it later disbanded, their contributions to the hip-hop scene cannot be ignored.

Grafton Records' De Indispensables (composed of Lenny B and Tick Lips) were the most successful duo of the 2000s. Not only did they sell out their headline gigs and perform at special venues around the globe, but they also broadened the appeal of Port Harcourt hip-hop to a larger audience. Their debut album on the Grafton imprint Press On came out in 2005. It was supported by the singles "Cinderella" and "Sweet Mama", the latter of which topped charts in Nigeria and charted at number sixteen on the UK DMC Urban Chart. Their second album Press on Pt. 2 made a greater impact. It included guest appearances from Junior Reid, Rugged man, M Trill, along with UK's Pyrelli and Phoebe One. The album spawned the single "I Love You" which debuted at number three on the UK R&B Chart, and reached number thirty-seven on the UK Top 40. De Indispensables won Best African West at the Channel O Music Video Awards after "I Love You" entered the Channel O chart at number one and stayed at the top for three weeks. Furthermore, "Peace Song" recorded alongside M Trill managed to hold down the number-one spot on MTV Base Africa chart for four weeks.

As the commercial viability of hip-hop culture, and rap music in particular grew, more artists began to incorporate the sound and new artists emerged onto the scene. Starting out as a Specimen A affiliate, Munachi Abii was one of the early female rap acts to gain acceptance among the generality of music lovers. The female answer to the male dominated hip-hop landscape. She worked with De Indispensables as a guest artist prior to winning the title of Most Beautiful Girl in Nigeria. As a solo rapper, she performed as Babyrella, collaborating with big-name artists, before eventually choosing Muna as her stage name. Sky B, a rapper-singer from Obio-Akpor was among the first hip-hop artists to break out nationally from the city. Although initially met with resistance from some rap fans, as well as radio stations, Sky B's Pray For Me garnered substantial traction with songs like "I'm Calling (Ma Bebe)", "You Promised Not To Go", "Pray For Me", "Here I Am", and is acknowledged widely to have achieved sales of over one million copies in Nigeria. With his charisma and laid-back style, he became a music favorite attracting an even wider following. His rise to fame in 2007 established the possibility that hip-hop music produced in Port Harcourt could have strong marketing and nationwide distribution.

Also in 2007, Double K brought out his first solo album, Katastrophy. He would be nominated for Best Hip Hop Artist at the 5th Niger Delta Advancement Awards. In 2008, De Indispensables announced their split from Grafton Records, after spending 4 years on the Tonye Ibiama-helmed record label. The group, in honor of their Ijaw tribal roots, renamed themselves Ijaw Boyz. Shortly thereafter, launching their own imprint under the name of Ijaw Boyz Entertainment. In that same year, M Trill's debut studio album Number One came out. He won Best African West at the Channel O Music Video Awards for "Bounce". During 2009, M Trill released his mixtape Ladies and Gentlemen, where he showcased his production skills and trademark lyrical wit.

New generation singers Duncan Mighty, Timaya, Burna Boy and Slim Burna, are beginning to fuse elements of hip-hop with various forms of reggae. Since the turn of the decade into the mid-2010s, there has been a resurgence in Pidgin-English rap through the appearance of the likes of Danas, Dandizzy, Ajebo Hustlers, Abobi Eddieroll, KING STUNNA and Dr. Barz.

=== Pop ===
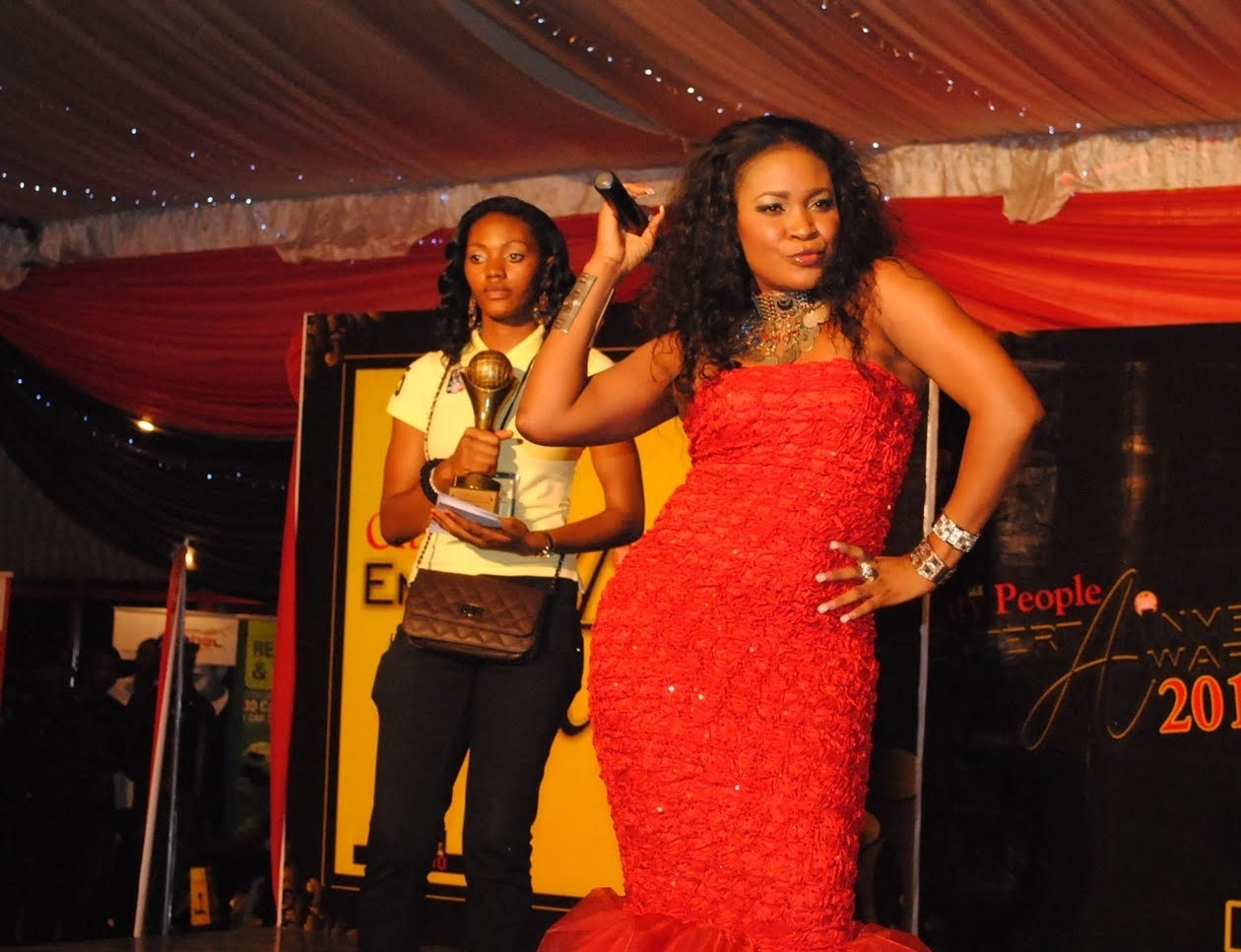
Muma Gee in 2010

Many contemporary pop music figures have come out of the city since the mid-2000s, most notable is Muma Gee whose singing career spans over two decades and she's still active to date. She is best known for the songs "Kade", "Accra Boy", a collaboration with Ghanaian band VIP, "African Juice", "African Woman Skilashy", "Port Harcourt Is Back" and more recently "Double Your Hustle". She has opened for Miriam Makeba and Yvonne Chaka Chaka, considered her biggest career moments. Her album Kade was released in 2006 and is regarded as the album that put Muma Gee in the nationwide spotlight.

The mid-to-late 2000s ushered in profound innovations in the Port Harcourt pop scene as local artists started gaining attention, blending indigenous influences with more popular musical forms, namely R&B, reggae, highlife, hip hop and afrobeat. Collaborations with rappers came into play. Pop artists would often integrate rapped verses into their songs and publicized them with a featuring credit, this unique tradition has continued to the present. Independent radio stations such as Rhythm 93.7 FM made homegrown tunes more available to residents of Port Harcourt and nearby cities. At this time, demand for foreign music had slowly begun to wane, while the majority of programming gradually assumed a protean nature. People of different class backgrounds were impacted by radio mainly, because they now heard music at home that they might have been able to hear only by attending a concert.

The progressive change in musical direction prepared the way for broader talent development efforts. Soty Horsfall, better known as Soty achieved a breakthrough with her 2007 song "Malaria". The music video enjoyed long airplay on television, especially on NTA 2 Channel 5. Port Harcourt's influence continued, however, and attained new heights during 2008 as Duncan Mighty made his way into the recording business. With the release of his first nationally distributed album, Koliwater (Fully Loaded), Duncan Mighty quickly evolved into a household name, ascending into the upper echelon of multi-talented trailblazers. OkayAfrica described the work as "melodious, genre-bending, and hyper-dimensional," and added: "Everyone could connect with it. Songs like "Dance For Me", "Ako Na Uche", "Ijeoma" and "Unu Ge Gbum Madu" showed how versatility can be reigned in for a cohesive LP." He stayed true to his Ikwerre roots, yet at the same time found a way to tap into other genres including reggae and R&B. Unlike most upstarts, he resided in Port Harcourt for a significant portion of his career and established himself as one of the most respected, influential and original musicians to penetrate the national and international markets. In 2009, M-Kaze released the widely feted Psycho, a follow-up to his debut project Music and M-Kaze (2006). He went on to win awards, among them, Best Collaboration and Artist of the Year at the 1st Odudu Music Awards. Psycho consisted of 14 tracks, mostly original production, as well as features from the likes of Frank D'Nero, Blah, Lyrikal, Veteran and Double K. The album was succeeded by King of the Underground, which yielded the hit singles "Sugar Banana" and "Change".

A number of musicians were further helped by the proliferation of the internet and the advent of social media, enabling them to gain exposure and grow their audience. Alaba DJ mixes were also advantageous in the spread of Port Harcourt pop throughout the country. Rapper turned singer Waconzy had his first taste of the limelight in 2010 when he released his solo debut single "I Celebrate", the title track of his debut album, I Celebrate. The song won the Song of the Year award at the 2010 Odudu Music Awards. A remix with Duncan Mighty was released the next year, for which he received his first City People Entertainment Award nomination. Waconzy's second album Money Back Guarante arrived in March 2013 and in September of that year, he revealed during an interview, that it had sold over 500,000 copies.

Former street vendor Mr 2Kay was the first male afro-pop solo act signed to prominent record label Grafton Records. Although he released his first studio album Waterside Boy in February 2012, it was not until the release of his song, "Bubugaga" later that year, that he achieved mainstream recognition. In 2013, Bubugaga was remixed with vocals from UK recording artists May7ven and Moelogo. Following its release to UK dance clubs, Kiss FM, Capital XTRA, BBC Radio 1Xtra playlisted it. He was nominated in the Diaspora Artist of the Year category at the 2014 Nigeria Entertainment Awards. The following year, at the same awards ceremony, he won Best Collaboration of the Year for "Bad Girl Special (Remix)". Other seasoned pop singers from Port Harcourt are Lamili, Fortune Okwuenyia, Kessy Driz, Korkormikor, Maxi, Oba Omega, Ric Hassani, Mr Eazi, Onosz and Idahams. The use of online social networking platforms to display and share artistic content continues its ascending trend into the 2020s, providing more opportunities for local unsigned talents. One well-known example is M-Josh who has had notable guest appearances and production credits for multiple hits. In early 2020, he returned to the spotlight of fame through social media exposure during the onset of the COVID-19 pandemic in Nigeria, utilizing afrobeat-influenced beats and conscious lyrics to highlight the realities of political corruption and socioeconomic inequality. His in-studio performance of the song "Coro" went viral on the web. It was aired on Pararan Mock News, and accrued more than one million views on Facebook before debuting at number 62 on 3–9 April Global YouTube Music Videos Chart.

Kutie started his musical pursuit during his elementary school day by composing rhymes and poems, also belonging to a church choir from teenage department to adult department and in the year 2009 he had his first studio experience recording with a church teenage choir as their lead singer. Kutie released his first song this year featuring another well established artist called Mosidon he titled the track Ohema which also won him an award in the froshboi music awards show.

=== Highlife ===
Virtually all highlife greats from Rivers State have started their career in Port Harcourt. The 1960s saw the rise to prominence of Cardinal Rex Lawson, with his Mayor's Dance Band, being among the first popular bands to achieve widespread success. His accomplishments helped shape the direction of African music in the twentieth century, probably the most influential highlife musician of that period.

Mayor's Dance Band and Rex Lawson released numerous hits and in later years became known as Rivers Men. The band made their mark on the international arena while more people were drawn to the sound. After Lawson's death in the 1970s, Rivers Men reestablished itself as The Professional Seagulls Dance Band. They were led by Prince David Bull who remained a key figure in the band for the time it existed. Aside from them, there were others like The Harbours whose song "Koma Mosi" became one of the landmark recordings of highlife music in the '70s and created a measure of notoriety for the band. The song, released on the Harbours Band 7-inch EP through Philips West African Records, gave rise to the metaphorical phrase "Easy Motion Tourist".

Another important performer is King Sunny Brown, often informally referred to as the Original Pickin. He began to sing at a young age in Christ Army School, there he played in the school band with Rex Lawson. During the Nigerian Civil War, Brown and Lawson played in the 3rd Marine commando band. He performed with musicians like Prince David Bull and thrilled fans at different venues across the city.

=== Reggae ===
Like hip-hop and highlife, reggae has long formed an essential part of the music of Port Harcourt. The most well-known representatives of this genre are Daniel Wilson, Duncan Mighty and Timaya. Muma Gee originally sang reggae songs before switching to pop. Other prolific acts include Porsh Kayiana, Bukwild Da Ikwerrian and Slim Burna. Former Mayor of Port Harcourt Chimbiko Akarolo claims that "I am in love with reggae music because it gives me the opportunity to reflect on what is happening in our environment." The singer Duncan Mighty's first major international collaboration "Wine It" featured Jamaican American Grammy Award-winning artist Shaggy. "Wine It" was released in 2012 to a mixed reception, but would later go on to attract some commercial success.

Also worth noting is the critically acclaimed I'm on Fire by Slim Burna, considered as the most successful mixtape from a Port Harcourt-based recording artist. The fifteen track project had some influences of dancehall mixed with pop, and revolved mostly around the themes of love, sex and city street life. In 2014, Sean Paul appeared on a remix of "Bum Bum" by Timaya from his fifth studio album Epiphany. The music video for the song, directed by Shutah Films, earned one nomination at the 33rd International Reggae and World Music Awards (IRAWMA). By June 2015, "Bum Bum Remix" had already become the fourth most viewed music video of Nigeria on YouTube, amassing over twenty five million views on the popular video sharing website. It also became the most played video put out by a Harcourtian. An achievement that lasted for four years until it was surpassed by "On The Low" from Burna Boy, who won Best International Act at the 2019 BET Awards. Since making his debut, Burna Boy has rose to the forefront of a wave of internationally recognized reggae/hip-hop crossover music stars out of Africa and has worked with the likes of Damian Marley, Konshens, Serani, Dre Skull, Lily Allen and Stefflon Don. His first studio album, L.I.F.E – Leaving an Impact for Eternity, which launched via Aristokrat Records, reached number 7 on the Billboard Reggae Albums Chart, and his major-label debut, Outside, peaked at number 3 on the same chart. His fourth album, African Giant was released on 26 July 2019. In Europe, the album reached the top 100 in five countries, including the UK, where it peaked at number 16. Additionally, it debuted at number 104 on the US Billboard 200 in the week of 5 August 2019, thus becoming Burna Boy's first entry on the chart. This led to him winning two All Africa Music Awards – one for Artist of the Year and the other for Best Male West Africa, plus an MTV Europe Music Award for Best African Act. On 20 November 2019, he received his first Grammy Award nomination at the 62nd annual ceremony, with African Giant being nominated for Best World Music Album. CNN ranked him number 1 on their 2019 list of Africa's 10 biggest musicians. Subsequently, he was selected as Cool FM's "Coolest Port Harcourt Artist of 2019", ahead of top-performing rising acts Ajebo Hustlers, 1Da Banton and Bukwild.

1Da Banton, who had signed with Squareball Records, garnered considerable buzz with his first extended play, titled The Banton EP that gained its favorable reputation largely based on its second track, "Way Up". The song topped the Zimbabwean iTunes charts for two weeks and appeared on the soundtrack of the reality competition TV series Big Brother Naija (season 3).
