= Lady IB =

Nigerian singer

Ibitoru I.B. Green, better known as Lady IB, is a singer from Bonny, Rivers State, Nigeria. She was elected Chair of the Performing Musicians Association of Nigeria Rivers State Branch in 2013, and is the second woman, after Muma Gee, to hold the position. After serving for about a year, she was re-elected to the same office for a second term. She has worked with artists such as Daniel Wilson, King Sunny Brown, Don Bruce, Geraldo Pino and Prince David Bull, among others.

== Awards ==
=== Odudu Music Awards ===
Year	Nominee / work	Award	Result	Ref
2011	"This Is My Time"	Best Vocal (Female)	Won	

== See also ==
- List of people from Rivers State
- Music of Port Harcourt
