= List of people from Port Harcourt =

The following is a list of notable people who were either born/raised or have lived for a significant period of time in the city of Port Harcourt, Rivers State, Nigeria.

== A ==
- George Abbey (born 1978), footballer
- Precious Achiuwa, basketball player
- Echendu Adiele (1978–2011), footballer
- Friday Ahunanya (born 1971), boxer
- Claude Ake (1939–1996), political scientist
- Mercy Akide (born 1975), former footballer
- Diezani Alison-Madueke (born 1960), former minister of Petroleum Resources
- Mactabene Amachree (born 1978), basketball player
- Chibuike Amaechi (born 1965), former governor of Rivers State
- Thankgod Amaefule (born 1984), footballer
- Mark Angel (born 1991), comedian, script writer and motivational speaker
- Napoleon Ashley-Lassen (born 1934), Chief of the Defence Staff of the Ghana Armed Forces
- Izu Azuka (born 1989), footballer

== B ==
- A. Igoni Barrett (born 1979), writer
- Andre Blaze (born 1983), rapper, reality talent show host
- Nimi Briggs (born 1944), Vice-Chancellor of the University of Port Harcourt
- Burna Boy (born 1991), singer, songwriter
- 1da Banton, singer, songwriter, music producer

== C ==
- Monalisa Chinda, actress
- Mercy Chinwo, singer, actress
- Chinonye Chukwu, writer, director
- Tonye Cole (born 1967), businessman

== D ==
- Agbani Darego (born 1982), model; first Black African Miss World
- George Datoru (born 1978), footballer
- Dandizzy, rapper
- Tonto Dikeh, actress and singer
- Duncan Dokiwari (born 1973), boxer
- Eddy Lord Dombraye (born 1979), footballer
- Daere Akobo (born 1973), businessman

== E ==
- Ngozi Ebere (born 1991), footballer
- Emmanuel Ebiede (born 1978), footballer
- Ehie Ogerenye Edison (born 1984), Nigerian politician,
- Obinna Ekezie (born 1975), basketball player
- Emmanuella (born 2010), comedian
- Tamara Eteimo (born 1987), actress and singer
- Dino Eze (born 1984), footballer
- Sandra Ezekwesili (born 1989), radio personality

== F ==
- Ibinabo Fiberesima (born 1973), actress
- Samuel Francis (born 1987), athlete

== G ==
- Muma Gee (born 1978), singer and actress
- Finidi George (born 1971), retired footballer
- Odeni George (born 1995), footballer
- Bikiya Graham-Douglas (born 1983), actress and businesswoman

== I ==
- Christian Ibeagha (born 1990), footballer
- John Ibeh (born 1986), footballer
- Tonye Ibiama (born 1974), businessman
- Bernie Ibini-Isei (born 1992), footballer
- David Ibiyeomie (born 1962), preacher
- Faith Ikidi (born 1987), footballer
- Manasseh Ishiaku (born 1983), footballer

== J ==
- Nasigba John-Jumbo (born 1988), footballer
- Patience Jonathan (born 1957), former First Lady of Nigeria

== K ==
- Ignatius Kattey (born 1948), archbishop

== L ==
- Obafemi Lasode (born 1955), actor
- Omah Lay, musician

== M ==
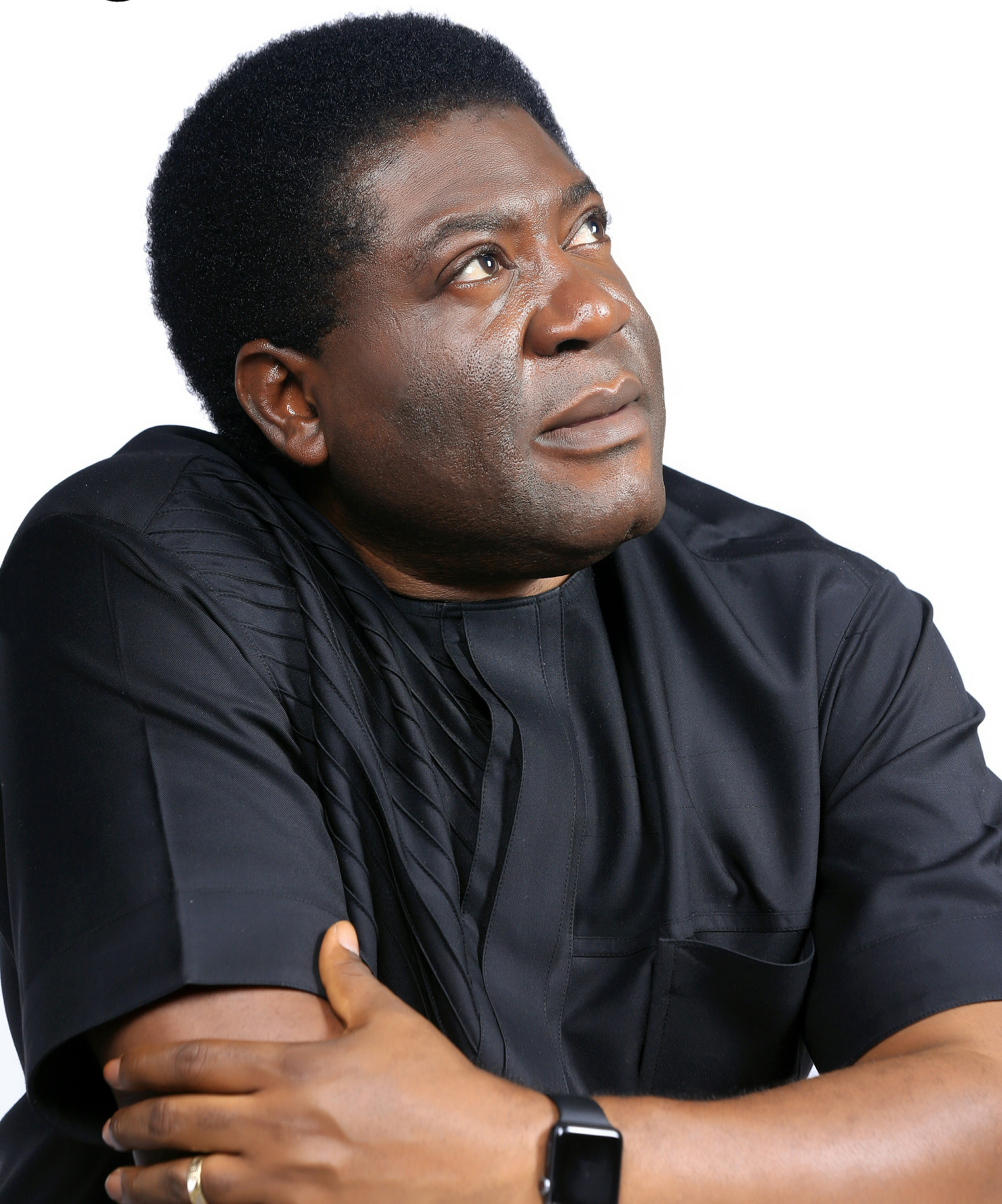
Prince Eze Madumere

- M-Trill (born 1979), rapper
- Davis Mac-Iyalla (born 1972), LGBT activist
- Chiamaka Madu (born 1996), footballer
- Prince Eze Madumere (born 1964), former Deputy Governor, Imo State
- Maud Meyer, jazz singer
- Duncan Mighty (born 1983), singer, record producer
- Oliver Mobisson (1943–2010), activist
- Mr 2kay, singer
- Mr Eazi, singer
- Muna, hip hop artist and pageant winner

== N ==
- Martin Newland (born 1961), journalist and executive director
- Ajuri Ngelale, Senior Special Assistant to President Muhammadu Buhari on public affairs
- Peter Nieketien (born 1968), former footballer
- Chimaroke Nnamani (born 1960), politician
- Ike Nwachukwu (born 1940), politician
- Chidi Nwanu (born 1967), footballer
- David Nwolokor (born 1996), footballer
- Benji Nzeakor (born 1964), retired footballer
- Priscilla Nzimiro (1923–1951), physician

== O ==
- Saint Obi, actor
- Chidi Odiah (born 1983), footballer
- Mary Odili (born 1952), Associate Justice of the Supreme Court of Nigeria
- Peter Odili (born 1948), Governor of Rivers State
- Walter Ofonagoro (born 1940), scholar, businessman
- Great Ogboru, businessman and politician
- Timothy Ogene, writer
- David Ojabo (born 2000), American football player
- Chinelo Okparanta, writer
- Aaron Samuel Olanare (born 1994), footballer
- Elkanah Onyeali, footballer
- Daniel Onyekachi (born 1985), footballer
- Yvonne Orji (born 1983), actress
- Richard Daddy Owubokiri (born 1961), retired footballer
- Ukel Oyaghiri (born 1964), lawyer, politician

== P ==
- Prince Tonye Princewill (born 1969), businessman and politician

== S ==
- Emmanuella Samuel, YouTube child comedian, best known for appearing in MarkAngelComedy videos
- Zina Saro-Wiwa, video artist and filmmaker
- Jesse Sekidika (born 1996), footballer
- Uchechi Sunday (born 1994), footballer

== T ==
- Marco Tagbajumi (born 1988), footballer
- Cleopatra Tawo, radio personality
- Elsie Nwanwuri Thompson, lawyer
- Timaya (born 1977), singer
- Nwankwo Tochukwu (born 1986), footballer
- Hector Tubonemi (born 1988), footballer

== U ==
- Colin Udoh, journalist and sports television presenter
- Mary Uranta, actress and businesswoman

== W ==
- Waconzy, singer, songwriter
- Adewale Wahab (born 1984), footballer
- Taribo West (born 1974), footballer
- Kay Williamson (1935–2005), linguist

== Y ==
- Albert Yobo (born 1979), footballer
- Joseph Yobo (born 1980), footballer

== See also ==
- List of people from Rivers State
