= Tonye Ibiama =

Nigerian businessman

- Born: 29 September 1974 (age 51); Port Harcourt, Rivers State
- Other name: Big T
- Occupations: Music executive; Talent manager; Businessman
- Known for: Grafton Entertainment
- Title: Label executive

Tamunotonye Soipiriala Adonye Ibiama (born 29 September 1974), commonly known as Tonye Ibiama or Big T is a UK-based Nigerian music executive, talent manager, and businessman. He is the founder and CEO of Grafton Entertainment, he has helped launch the careers of many artists including De Indispensables, M Trill, Idahams, Tha IBZ, and Mr. 2Kay.

== Early life ==
Ibiama grew up primarily in Port Harcourt, Rivers State.

== Career ==
In 2004, he founded Grafton Entertainment, and announced the signing of its first recording acts: De Indispensables, M Trill, and record producer Slim Burna within the space of 4 years from 2004 to 2008. Within 2008–2009, a stand-up comedian Prince Hezekiah joined its roaster. In 2009, Tha IBZ joined its artist roaster. In 2010, Mr 2Kay, and Big Mouf joined its artist roaster. In 2011, J-Boy joined its artist roaster. In 2016, Idahams joined the label, as an in-house producer and is primarily known for Mr 2Kay's "God Can Bless Anybody".

In 2019, Tonye's music recording company Grafton Entertainment partnered with Nigeria LNG to host a football tournament in the Bonny Island, to discover, develop, and empower the next Nigerian football star from Bonny Island. In the same year, Grafton Entertainment partnered with Universal Music Group flagship in West Africa, Universal Music Group Nigeria to distribute, and market Idahams's extended play albums Amayanabo, released globally on 5 July 2019 and Man on Fire, released globally on 12 June 2020.

== See also ==
- List of people from Port Harcourt
