= Seki Dance =

Type of theatrical dance performance

Seki Dance, also known as the Seki Dance Drama, is a type of performance dance that traces the roots of the American tap dance to the Indigenous people of the Niger Delta. This theatrical dance performance was created by Yibo Koko in Rivers State, Nigeria.

Séki dance showcases the dances of the people of Niger Delta, Nigeria and how they came to be.

== Etymology ==
Seki is an Ijaw word which means "to dance", which has its origin in Okrika, Rivers State, Nigeria.

== History ==
Seki, the ‘Dance-drama’ created by Yibo Koko, is a massive production that engaged over ninety-two performers on stage, including the Creator Yibo Koko, who played the role of the narrator. The Seki was initially prepared as an entry for the 1998 Atlanta Georgia National Black Arts Festival, but got its premiere at the Eko Hotels and Suites, Lagos, on Saturday 26 March 2016, as commissioned by Heritage Bank Nigeria Plc.
