= Footprints (Duncan Mighty album) =

Studio album by Duncan Mighty
- Released: November 22, 2013
- Genre: Hip hop; reggae; Afrobeats
- Length: 77:29
- Language: English, Pidgin, Igbo, Ikwerre
- Label: W AireMighty
- Producer: Duncan Mighty

Duncan Mighty chronology
Legacy (Ahamefuna) (2011)	Footprints (2013)	Grace & Talent (2014)

Footprints is the third studio album by Nigerian singer Duncan Mighty. It was released on November 22, 2013.

== Background ==
The 18-track album has a running time of 77 minutes and features Timaya, Wande Coal, Shaggy, Otuu Sax, and Sandaz Black. It is the follow-up to his 2011 album Legacy (Ahamefuna).

== Reception ==
Ayomide Tayo of Nigerian Entertainment Today reviewed that the album Footprints is a raw, sometimes unprocessed body of work by Duncan Mighty. The reviewer added that Footprints is a direct and honest album while noting that there are a few moments when the album feels bland and uninspiring. "Tracks such as 'Hustlers Anthem', 'Manuchim-Soh', 'Owhornu-Ogwu' slows down the lengthy album which boasts of 18 tracks", he said.

== Track listing ==
No.	Title	Length
1.	"Amen Amen"	3:41
2.	"Drive Me Crazy"	3:31
3.	"I Know I Know That" (Featuring Timaya)	4:44
4.	"Light-Ooh"	4:25
5.	"She's my Faithful"	4:49
6.	"Ghetto Youth"	4:50
7.	"Didiamkpor"	3:21
8.	"Manuchim-Soh"	5:04
9.	"Rejection to Attraction"	4:47
10.	"Wine It" (Featuring Shaggy)	4:31
11.	"Owhornu-Ogwu"	3:58
12.	"Wannu Baby"	3:03
13.	"We Go Dey Dey" (Featuring Wande Coal)	3:34
14.	"Hustler's Anthem"	6:44
15.	"So in Love" (Featuring Otuu Sax)	3:50
16.	"Cee Ma Baby" (Featuring Sandazblack)	4:09
17.	"Giving Glory to Da Lord"	5:39
18.	"Port Harcourt Boi" (Remix)	3:00
Total length:		77:29

== See also ==
- List of 2013 albums
- Music of Port Harcourt
