= Adasa Cookey =

Nigerian music video director (born 1981)

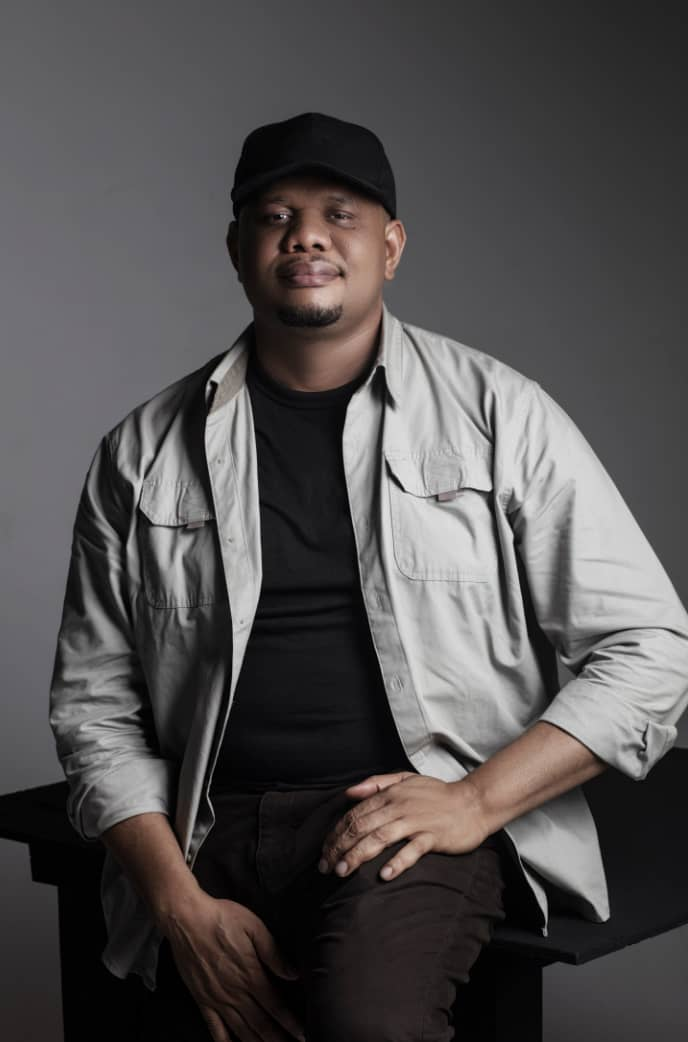

Background information
- Born: Adasa Rawlinson Cookeygam; 21 October 1981 (age 45); Port Harcourt, Rivers State, Nigeria
- Occupations: Cinematographer, editor, colourist, music video director, commercial director, filmmaker
- Years active: 2010–present
- Website: www.adasacookey.com
- Education: Rivers State University of Science and Technology

Adasa Cookey (born Adasa Rawlinson Cookeygam) is a Nigerian-born music video director, cinematographer, commercial director, colourist, and filmmaker. He works and directs for Squareball Media Productions Limited where he is also the chief executive officer of the company, which is also a record label that houses 1da Banton & Eli Jae.

== Early life ==
Adasa was born on October 21, 1981, in Port Harcourt, Rivers State, Nigeria. He spent his early childhood in Port Harcourt, where he attended secondary school at Bereton College and Federal Government College. Thereafter, he proceeded to study at Rivers State University of Science and Technology and earned a Bachelor of Technology in Architecture.

== Career ==
Adasa left his customer care representative job in 2010 to switch his passion in video editing and directly. He has directed the music videos of music artistes like Davido, Burna Boy, Simi, Adekunle Gold, D'Prince, and Don Jazzy.

== Selected videography ==
- Burna Boy – Like To Party (2013)
- D'Prince – Goody Bag (2013)
- Ketchup- Show Me Yuh Rozay (2013)
- Mavins All Stars - Adaobi (2014)
- DJ Xclusive ft Davido – Wo Le (2015)
- Adekunle Gold - Sade (2015)
- Adekunle Gold - Ready (2016)
- Ric Hassani -Only You (2017)
- Orezi-Cooking Pot (2017)
- Idahams-Toast (2017)
- Simi – Selense (2019)
- Simi – Ayo (2019)
- Simi – Duduke (2020)
- Simi ft Patoranking – Jericho (2019)
- Bebe Cool ft Rudeboy - Feeling (2020)
- Runtown ft. Bella Shmurda, Darkovibes – Body Riddim (Video) (2020)
- Simi ft. Adekunle Gold – By You (2019)
- Praiz – Madu (2020)
- Niniola – Addicted (2020)
- Wande Coal ft. Wale – Again (Remix) (2020)
- Wande Coal – Again (2020)
- Idahams-Billion Dollar (2019)
- Idahams-Ada (2020)
- Idahams-Enter My Eye (2020)
- Stonebwoy ft. Zlatan- Critical (2021)

== Awards and nominations ==
Year	Project	Ceremony	Category	Result
2016	"himself"	City People Entertainment	Best Music Video Director of the Year	Nominated
2020	Simi ft Patoranking "Jericho"	Soundcity MVP Awards Festival	Video of the Year	Nominated
2020	"Himself"	GALAXY AWARDS	Video Director of the Year	Won
2019	Simi ft Patoranking "Jericho"	AFRIMA Award	Best African Video	Nominated
2017	Orezi, "Cooking Pot"	AFRIMA Award	Best African Video of the Year	Won
2016	Adekunle Gold, "Pick Up the Call"	Nigeria Music Video Awards	Best Cinematography	Won
2016	Ranti, "Iwe Ki Ko"	Nigeria Music Video Awards	Best Editor	Nominated
2016	Ranti, "Iwe Ki Ko"	Nigeria Music Video Awards	Best Director	Nominated
