= Count It All Joy (EP) =

EP by Mr 2Kay
- Released: February 15, 2016
- Recorded: 2015
- Genre: Reggae
- Length: 32:33
- Label: Grafton Records

Mr 2Kay chronology
Waterside Boy (2012)	Count It All Joy (2016)

Singles from ...And See That's the Thing
- 1. "Bad Girl Special Remix (feat. Seyi Shay & Cynthia Morgan)" Released: February 6, 2015; 2. "Who No Like Better Thing" Released: June 5, 2015; 3. "Moniegram (feat. Timaya)" Released: November 19, 2015

Count It All Joy is the first extended play by Nigerian Afro-pop recording artist Mr 2Kay. It was released exclusively to digital media outlets on the February 10, 2016, by Grafton Records for online streaming on the music app Mtn Musicplus founded by the telecom's company MTN Group .

== Listening session ==
On Wednesday, 10 February 2016, Mr 2Kay held an album listening session at Industry Nite in Lagos. He gave a detailed account of each song on the album and signed autograph copies of the album for each guest. The event was hosted by Spanky.

== Accolades ==
Bad Girl Special (Remix) was nominated for "Best Reggae/Dancehall Single" at the 2015 edition of The Headies.

Year	Awards ceremony	Award description(s)	Results
2015	The Headies	Best Reggae/Dancehall Single	Nominated

== Track listing ==
No.	Title	Length
1.	"In the Morning"	3:34
2.	"Number 1"	3:38
3.	"Count It All Joy"	3:04
4.	"Ladder"	3:57
5.	"Wombolombo"	3:35
6.	"Woods"	3:26
7.	"Who No Like Better Thing" (featuring (The Jonsers))	3:28
8.	"Moniegram" (featuring (Timaya))	3:55
9.	"Bad Girl Special Remix" (featuring (Cynthia Morgan & Seyi Shay))	3:46
Total length:		32:33

== Release history ==
Region	Date	Format	Label	Ref
Nigeria	February 15, 2016	Digital download	Grafton Records	
