= King of the Wolves =

King Of The Wolves

EP by Alpha P
- Released: 15 November 2019
- Recorded: Universal Music Studios, (Lagos)
- Genre: Afropop
- Length: 16:30
- Label: Universal Music Nigeria
- Producer: TMXO(exec.); London; Altims

Alpha P chronology
King Of The Wolves (00000000)	Wolves & Mustangs, Vol. 1 (2020)

King of the Wolves (KOTW) is the debut extended play by Nigerian singer-songwriter Alpha P. It was released on 15 November 2019 through Universal Music Group Nigeria.

== Background and promotion ==
Following the disbanding of the music duo RNA, an abbreviation for Rema, and Alpha P. Mavin Records former A&R executive Bizzle Osikoya secured him a record deal with Universal Music Nigeria in 2019. After signing with Universal, he began working on his debut project. On 15 November 2019, Universal Music, announced the signing and release of King Of The Wolves via Instagram. On 13 March 2020, while promoting his EP on his media tour, Alpha P stopped at Soundcity 98.5 Lagos, and spoke about his EP with Sheye Banks, and the story behind it. On 28 March 2020, YouTube released an Online African Music Festival, titled "Stay Home... #WithMe" during lockdown. Alpha P, performed every song on King Of The Wolves from Universal Music Studio in Lagos via YouTube.

The project was supported with "Paloma", a lead song from album which was surrounded with controversies, as fans compared the record to Rema "Dumebi". On 8 February 2020, Alpha P performed a live version of "More" on Cool FM AUX Africa show. On 28 November 2020, Paloma was premiered on Apple Music 1 Soulection radio show by Joe Kay.

== Other releases ==
On 13 May 2020, DJ Tunez, released an Amapiano version of "Paloma", through Universal. The version came after, the original song had surpassed 900k views on YouTube.

== Track listing ==
No.	Title	Writer(s)	Producer(s)	Length
1.	"Fayah"	Princewell Emmanuel	TMXO	3:07
2.	"Paloma"	Princewell Emmanuel	London	3:13
3.	"Radar"	Princewell Emmanuel	London	3:26
4.	"More"	Princewell Emmanuel	Altims	3:29
5.	"Tonight"	Princewell Emmanuel	Altims	3:15
Total length:				16:30

== Personnel ==
- Princewell Emmanuel - Primary artist, writer
- Ezegozie Eze Jr. - Executive producer
- Bizzle Osikoya - A&R Executive
- TMXO - Executive producer, production (track 1)
- London - Production (tracks 2, 3)
- Altims - Production (tracks 4, 5)
- Noah Airé - Mastering Engineer

== Release history ==
Region	Date	Format	Version	Label
Various	15 November 2019	CD, digital download	Standard	Universal Music Nigeria
