= Rivers State Tourism Development Agency =

Nigerian government agency

- Official logo of RSTDA

Agency overview
- Formed: January 2012
- Jurisdiction: Government of Rivers State
- Headquarters: D-line, Port Harcourt 500261; 4°48′22″N 7°0′1″E
- Agency executives: Yibo Koko, Director-General; Mrs Minafuro Elizabeth, Director of Finance and Accounting; Rev Don Kester, Head of Business Development and Marketing
- Website: www.rstda.org

The Rivers State Tourism Development Agency (abbreviated : RSTDA) is an agency of the Government of Rivers State in Nigeria. It is responsible for promoting and improving sustainable tourism activities and attractions in the state. Established in January 2012, the agency's mission is to initiate partnerships with local and international tourism, cultural and development agencies with a view to maximize the tourism potentials in Rivers State and meet best global practices.

The RSTDA has its headquarters in D-line, Port Harcourt. The current Director-General is Mr Yibo Koko.

== See also ==
- Carniriv
- Rivers State Ministry of Culture and Tourism
- Music of Port Harcourt
