= PMAN Rivers State Branch =

Musicians' association in Rivers State, Nigeria

The Performing Musicians Association of Nigeria Rivers State Branch (PMAN Rivers State Branch) is an organization existing to promote the music profession and oversee the welfare of musicians in Rivers State, Nigeria. It is the state affiliate of the national Performing Musicians Association of Nigeria (PMAN). Its state headquarters are in Port Harcourt.

== History ==
Founded in 1995, Geraldo Pino, a musician from Enugu led the association until 2004. He was succeeded by Muma Gee who became the first elected female chairman, but was later "impeached for misappropriation of funds and lack of accountability." In 2010, Lexy M assumed leadership of the association. He served until 2013 when succeeded by Lady IB, the second woman to hold the position.

== Leadership ==
As of 2013, the executive board of the organization includes:

- Chairman
- Vice-chairman 1
- Vice chairman 2
- Publicity secretary
- Treasurer
- Provost

== List of chairmen ==
The following is a list of past and present chairs of PMAN Rivers State Branch:

- Geraldo Pino
- Muma Gee
- Arthur W. Pepple, Jr.
- Peterstone Cole
- Lekara "Lexy" Mueka (aka Lexy M)
- Lady IB

== See also ==
- Music of Port Harcourt
