= Carniriv =

Annual fest in Nigeria

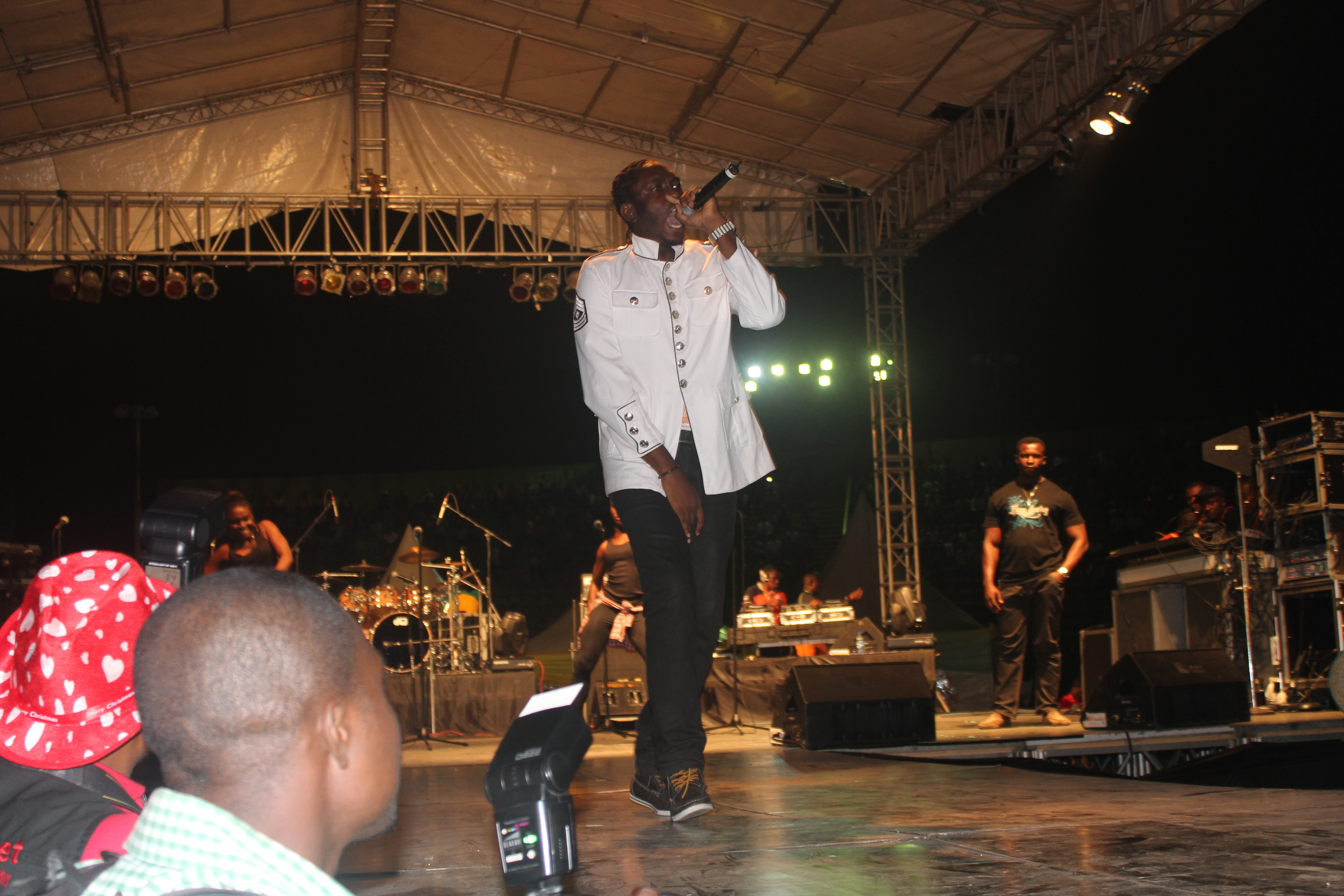
- King Stunna Carniriv 2013
- Status: Active
- Genre: Festivals
- Begins: 1988
- Location: Port Harcourt
- Country: Nigeria

The land of a thousand Masquerades

The Carniriv (English: Car-nee-rev) is an annual festival held in Port Harcourt, Nigeria. The Carnival starts a few weeks before Christmas, and lasts seven days. During this time, several ceremonial events are held; most of which have some cultural and/or sacred significance.

The festival combines traditional cultural elements with contemporary Caribbean-style carnival features. It also features musical performances from both local and international artists.

The Government of Rivers State recognizes Carniriv as its biggest tourism export. With economic interests increasingly identifying tourism as a viable alternative to the fossil fuel economy - especially in these parts - the Rivers State government has funded the event via the Rivers State Tourism Development Agency to promote regional tourism. Thus, it has always made available the necessary financial backing for the event each year, and has also worked hard through the Rivers State Tourism Development Agency and the Ministry of Culture and Tourism to ensure that it is held.

== History ==
Carniriv ’88 is the direct predecessor of Carniriv: The Port Harcourt Carnival. From 1988 through to 2008 the idea of staging a carnival with statewide participation evolved in several forms - most notably in the form of Rivifest - until the emergence of the current carnival. Carniriv: The Port Harcourt Carnival was construed and staged in 2008, and with it came the strong desire to build a robust and ultimately attractive carnival brand.

=== Orientation ===
Rivers State is known as the land of a thousand masquerades. The State contains over 300 dialects and multiple ethnic groups.

The event incorporates the heritage of the various ethnic groups in Rivers State.

== Events ==
=== Garden City Freestyle Parade ===
The final day features a cultural procession through Port Harcourt involving various bands. Traditionally, six bands participate in this procession, with 5 bands (namely: Jubilee, Liberation, Dynamic, Fusion, and Treasure) all wrapped-up in fervent competition.

=== International Heritage Parade ===
In true carnival style, contingents from the 23 LGAs engage a procession along a predefined route through the streets of Port Harcourt- showcasing enthralling dances and masquerade displays as they do so. All of these performances are embedded in colouful floats adorned with impressive icons. This year, the Heritage Parade included troupes from Malaysia and South Africa as participants.

=== Kids Carnival ===
The festival includes a dedicated Kids Carnival section.

The Children's Carnival is a procession from the Elekahia playground to Liberation Stadium.
