= Prince Eke =

Nigerian actor

- Born: Prince Oluebube Eke; 18 August 1977; Ngor Okpala, Imo
- Other name: Mr. Humility
- Education: Imo State University
- Occupations: Actor; film director; model
- Years active: 2003–present
- Known for: Secret Code
- Spouse: Muma Gee (m. 2011)
- Children: 1 son, 2 daughters: Caesar Chika; Cleopatra Chisa; Obiaranma
- Relatives: 7

Prince Oluebube Eke (born 18 August 1977) is a Nigerian actor, film director, writer, television personality and model. He was married to Muma Gee, a businesswoman with whom he had three children. He first garnered fame as an actor in 2003 starring in the Nollywood movie Indecent Proposal. Some of his other movies include Spade: The Last Assignment (2009), Mirror of Life (2010), Secret Code (2011), and A Minute Silence (2012).

== Early life and education ==
Born in Ngor Okpala, Imo State, southeastern region of Nigeria, Eke was the last child in a family of seven boys and a girl. He attended Holy Ghost College, Owerri for his secondary education and had a master's degree in International Relations from Imo State University (IMSU).

== Partial filmography ==
Year	Title	Role	Other notes
2003	Indecent Proposal		
2009	Spade: The Last Assignment	Bulldog	Action / Adventure / Crime
2010	Mirror of Life	George	Drama
2011	Secret Code	Pisso	Drama
2011	The Code 2	Pisso	Drama
2012	A Minute Silence	Nnamdi	Fantasy
2014	Pay Back	Steven	Drama
2015	Sacred Egg		Drama / Fantasy
2017	Pretty Little Things	Maicon	Drama / Romance
