= Number One (M Trill album) =

Studio album by M Trill
- Released: 17 October 2008
- Recorded: 2005–2008; Grafton Records Studio (Port Harcourt, Rivers State)
- Genres: Hip hop, hiplife
- Length: 60:04
- Label: Grafton
- Producer: Tonye Ibiama (exec.)

M Trill chronology
Number One (2008)	Ladies and Gentlemen (2010)

Singles from Number One
- 1. "Bounce" Released: 2005

Number One is the debut studio album by Nigerian rapper M Trill. It was released on 17 October 2008 by Grafton Records with distribution by Afrobest Productions. Supported by the hit single "Bounce" which gained airplay on several major radio stations, the album contains guest appearances from 2Shotz, Ruggedman, Timaya, Uchie, Korkormikor, Frank D Nero, ShoBoi and vocals from Ghanaian singer Fire. All songs on Number One were written solely by Teria Yarhere. Although the record involved a lot more rap music, it also encompassed a distinct highlife/hip hop sound.

== Background ==
M Trill began recording music after high school and signed his first recording contract with Xcel Music. In 2005, he released his first single "Bounce" which received significant radio airplay in Nigeria and abroad. By the time he graduated from the University of Port Harcourt, M Trill had begun to reach a mainstream audience with many big labels offering him record deals. He later signed to Grafton Records after leaving Xcel Music. M Trill has explained the reason for switching record labels:

...I have always wanted to be one of the world's best, and since my deal with Grafton included a UK release and I have always looked at the wider market. Also, I knew Grafton Records as always being true to their words. When they say something, they do it.

== Release ==
In early October 2008, M Trill announced Number One had been completed. He said that the album won't only appeal to rap fans but will influence the general public's perception of rap music: "Rap does not necessarily have to be noisy or hardcore, it's a kind of music that people should be able to relate with, that is why I tried as much as possible to pick my words. This is because I want listeners to understand the message I am trying to pass across." Furthermore, Tonye Ibiama, the label's head revealed in an interview that they delayed the release of the album to handle pending projects. On 17 October 2008, Grafton Records threw a one-day star-studded "bash" in Rivers State which saw in its attendance rappers Ruggedman and 2Shotz as well as a host of other music celebrities. The event, held in Port Harcourt at the Hotel Presidential, served as the album's launch party.

== Composition ==
Number One is generally rap music although a few songs on the album are a mixture of hip hop and highlife music. The first track, which is titled "Intro" is a compelling showcase of M Trill's simplistic yet slick rhyming and hook-laden, avant-garde sound. Following the track is "Langwa Remix". The song featured 2Shotz and is similar in tone to its predecessor. M Trill continued impressively on the single "Bounce". Crossing into a new hiplife territory, "Beautiful", the fourth song recorded alongside Ghanaian artist Fire introduced a different feel to the album. "Come Clean" was another rap throwdown in which M Trill would state his intents.

Number One lacked the naiveté expected from a newcomer rather it exhibited more of personality, maturity and growth. In addition, the album included cinematic skits intended to prep the listener for whats to come. For "My Party", Timaya was enlisted to add his vocals. The song incorporated elements drawn from highlife and hip hop. "First listen", a track that features Uchie and Ruggedman also gave the album a more distinct vibe of its own.

== Reception ==
=== Accolades ===
==== Channel O Music Video Awards ====
Year	Nominee / work	Award	Result	Ref
2008	"Bounce"	Best West African Video	Won	

==== African Music Awards ====
Year	Nominee / work	Award	Result	Ref
2009	"Number one"	Best new act	Won	

== Track listing ==
No.	Title	Performer(s)	Length
1.	"Intro"	M Trill	1:42
2.	"Langwa (Remix)"	M Trill, 2Shotz	4:08
3.	"Bounce"	M Trill	4:08
4.	"Beautiful"	M Trill, Fire	5:42
5.	"Number One"	M Trill, Korkormikor	4:13
6.	"Come Clean"	M Trill	4:51
7.	"Beat Box (Skit)"		0:47
8.	"Fine Boi"	M Trill	3:54
9.	"My Party (Jolly)"	M Trill, Timaya	4:34
10.	"Wetin Dey"	M Trill	3:55
11.	"Where U Dey"	M Trill	3:15
12.	"First Listen"	M Trill, Ruggedman, Uchie	4:49
13.	"Bridge This"	M Trill	4:22
14.	"Skit"		0:24
15.	"Auto Tune (Singiay)"	M Trill	4:19
16.	"Where U Dey (Remix)"	M Trill, ShoBoi	4:09
17.	"Langwa"	M Trill, Frank D Nero	4:48
Total length:			60:04

== Release history ==
Country	Date	Version	Format	Label
Nigeria	17 October 2008	Standard	CD; digital download	Grafton Records
