= Alpha P =

Nigerian singer-songwriter (born 2002)

- Born: Princewill Emmanuel; February 26, 2002 (age 24); Benin City, Edo, Nigeria
- Genres: Afropop; Afrobeats; hip hop; trap
- Occupations: Rapper; singer; songwriter
- Years active: 2019–present
- Label: Penthauze

Princewill Emmanuel (born February 26, 2002), professionally known as Alpha P, is a Nigerian rapper and singer-songwriter signed to Penthauze. Previously, he was signed to Universal Music West Africa (formerly Universal Music Group Nigeria), an imprint of Universal Music Group, in 2019. That same year, he rose to fame with his debut extended play, King of the Wolves. He gained international recognition with his 2024 single "W", featuring Nigerian rapper Olamide and record producer Thisizlondon.

== Early life ==
Alpha P was born in Benin City, Edo State, and raised in the city's Southside. At age 12, he began making music, drawing inspiration from his early experiences writing songs in the church choir, which sparked a deep passion for the art. Growing up, Alpha P's musical influences included Wizkid, Wande Coal, D'banj, Banky W., Eminem, Drake, and Jaden Smith. Despite not being part of the choir, he relocated to Lagos to pursue a professional music career.

== Career ==
=== 2019–2020: Career beginnings, record deals, King of the Wolves, and Wolves & Mustangs, Vol. 1 ===
Alpha P began his music career in 2019, performing in churches alongside fellow artist Rema. After RNA (comprising Rema and Alpha P) disbanded, Bizzle Osikoya, former A&R executive at Mavin Records, facilitated Alpha P's record deal with Universal Music Group Nigeria (now marketed as. Universal Music West Africa) in 2019. On September 6, 2019, during his media tour promoting King Of The Wolves, Alpha P visited Soundcity 98.5 Lagos and discussed his EP and its inspiration with Sheye Banks. Alpha P gained momentum and was featured on Tomi Owó's single "Number One" on October 18, 2019, which was included on the MTV Shuga Naija soundtrack. On November 15, 2019, Alpha P release his debut extended play, King Of The Wolves through Universal Music. On December 19, 2019, Alpha P released the music video for "Paloma", the second track from his debut EP, shot by Dalia Dias, which sparked controversy as fans drew comparisons between Rema's hit single "Dumebi", and Alpha P's "Paloma" on Twitter.

In January 2020, Connect Nigeria named "Radar", a track from Alpha P's King Of The Wolves EP, Song of the Week. On February 8, 2020, Alpha P delivered a live performance of "More" on Cool FM's AUX Africa show. YouTube hosted its Online African Music Festival, Stay Home... #WithMe on March 28, 2020, amidst the lockdown, featuring Alpha P's performance of his entire King Of The Wolves EP from Universal Music Studio in Lagos. On 13 May 2020, Alpha P, DJ Tunez, and D3an released an EDM version of "Paloma" for the remix. On July 10, 2020, Alpha P was featured on Ricky Tyler's "Peachnut". In September 2020, he released the single "Quarantine", which later became the lead single for his project Wolves & Mustangs, Vol. 1. Released subsequently, Wolves & Mustangs, Vol. 1 featured four tracks, including a collaboration with PsychoYP.

=== 2021–present: Feature run and Welcome To The Pack ===
Alpha P released "Oh No" on June 11, 2021. Later that month, on June 25, he was featured on Justin Bieber's "Peaches (remix)", alongside Omah Lay and Masterkraft, who also serves as the primary producer of the Afrobeats version. The remix charted at number 7 on Nigeria's Songs of Summer Chart. In November 2021, Alpha P was featured on DJames' song "Whine," produced by DJames and Michael Walls.

On August 25, 2022, DJ Tunez features Alpha P, alongside Wizkid, and Tay Iwar on "Majo". The track debuted at number 12 on the UK Afrobeats Singles Chart, and number 47 on Nigeria's TurnTable Top 100 Songs, on the week of 29 August 2022. Alpha P was featured on Y.D.A's "SADE" remix alongside King Perryy in October 2022. On 23 November 2022, he released "Veronica" featuring Babyboy AV and produced by Blaisebeatz.

After a quiet 2023, Alpha P signed a record deal with Phyno's Penthauze Records on August 23, 2024, and released his debut single under the label titled, "W," featured rapper Olamide and produced Thisizlondon. This single was included on his second EP, Welcome To The Pack, released on September 6, 2024. Welcome To The Pack boasts appearances from Olamide, London, and Kemuel. The project received positive reviews from music critics, including T. J. Martins reviewing for Album Talks.

== Discography ==
=== Extended plays ===
List of extended plays, with selected details and chart positions
Title	Details	Peak chart positions
Title	Details	NGR
King of the Wolves	Released: November 15, 2019; Label: Universal Music Group Nigeria; Formats: Digital download, streaming	—
Wolves & Mustangs, Vol. 1	Released: November 11, 2020; Label: Universal Music Group Nigeria; Formats: Digital download, streaming	—
Welcome To The Pack	Released: September 6, 2024; Label: Penthauze; Formats: Digital download, streaming	—

=== Singles ===
List of charted singles, with selected chart positions
Title	Year	Peak chart positions			Certifications	Album
Title	Year	NG	UK	US	Certifications	Album
"W"	2024	43	—	—		Welcome To The Pack
"Location"	2025	—	—	—		TBA
