= Legacy (Ahamefuna) =

Studio album by Duncan Mighty
- Released: January 19, 2011
- Genre: Hip hop; reggae; rap
- Length: 64:32
- Language: English, Pidgin, Igbo
- Label: W AireMighty
- Producer: Duncan Mighty

Duncan Mighty chronology
Fully Loaded (Koliwater) (2011)	Legacy (Ahamefuna) (2011)	Footprints (2013)

Legacy is the second studio album by Nigerian singer Duncan Mighty. It was released on January 19, 2011.

== Background ==
The 15-track album has a running time of 64 minutes and it features no one.

== Singles ==
Obianuju was a single in the album. The song takes its name from Duncan Mighty's love interest as he tells a story of his feelings, channeling the right emotions to deliver a classic record.

== Track listing ==
No.	Title	Length
1.	"Hand of Jesus"	4:15
2.	"Ahamefuna"	3:56
3.	"Na God"	5:29
4.	"Isimgbaka"	5:34
5.	"Portharcourt Son"	5:45
6.	"I Don't Give a Shot"	3:57
7.	"Golden Ring"	4:36
8.	"I love you"	4:14
9.	"Obianuju"	3:41
10.	"Indian Girl"	4:09
11.	"Same Fire"	4:29
12.	"Good Luck Jonathan"	4:50
13.	"I No Fit Shout"	3:36
14.	"Aroma"	2:14
15.	"Obianuju" (Remix)	3:53
Total length:		60:04

== Reception ==
The album was a hit in Nigeria and other neighbouring countries.

== See also ==
- Music of Port Harcourt
