= POS (singer) =

Nigerian singer-songwriter (born 1994)

- Born: Ordu Philip; 6 September 1998 (age 28); Port Harcourt, Rivers State, Nigeria
- Genres: Afro-fusion; Afrobeats
- Occupations: Singer; songwriter
- Years active: 2020–present
- Label: PEWL Records

Ordu Philip (born 6 September 1998), known professionally as POS, is a Nigerian singer, songwriter, and performer. He gained recognition with a viral TikTok hit single "Wyn", which debuted on the Spotify Viral Top 50 and official Nigeria TurnTable Top 100 songs and Radio chart.

== Early life and education ==
Ordu Philip was born and raised in Port Harcourt, Nigeria on 6 September 1998.He attended Gospel International Comprehensive College in Rivers State before furthering to the University of Port Harcourt. He started developing interest for music at the age of 7 when he started playing piano.

== Career ==
POS officially launched his music career with the release of his debut single titled "Issues". In 2024, He gained recognition with the release of "Wyn" which became a viral hit on TikTok. In April 2024, POS entered the top 5 trending Nigerian artistes on Audiomack across all genres. In May 2024 he was ranked at number 21 on TurnTable's NXT Emerging Top Artistes for 15 weeks. In July 2024, Wyn debuted on Spotify Viral Top 50 Nigeria. In August 2024, “Wyn” debuted at No. 86 on official Nigeria TurnTable Top 100 songs. In November 2024, "Wyn" was listed among the best Nigerian Songs of 2024. In August 2024, he released another single titled "Lifestyle"

== Discography ==
=== Singles ===
- "Issues (2024)"
- "Lifestyle (2024)"
- "Wyn (2024)"

== See also ==
- Music of Port Harcourt
