= Grace & Talent =

Grace & Talent (No Man is Self Made)

Studio album by Duncan Mighty
- Released: December 17, 2014
- Genre: Hip hop; reggae; Afrobeats
- Length: 67:12
- Language: English, Pidgin, Igbo, Ikwerre
- Label: Young Wealth Records
- Producer: Duncan Mighty

Duncan Mighty chronology
Footprints (2013)	Grace & Talent (No Man is Self Made) (2014)	The Certificate (2016)

Grace & Talent is the fourth studio album by Nigerian singer Duncan Mighty. It was released on December 17, 2014.

== Background ==
The 16-track album has a running time of sixty-seven minutes and seventeen seconds. The album featured Phyno, Olamide, KING STUNNA, J Flex, Noren and TickLips.

== Track listing ==
No.	Title	Writer(s)	Producer	Length
1.	"Jide Ofor" (featuring Phyno)	Duncan Okechukwu Mighty, Chibuzor Nelson Azubuike	Duncan Mighty
2.	"Spray Me Money" (featuring Noren)	Duncan Okechukwu Mighty, Noren	Duncan Mighty
3.	"Local To International"	Duncan Okechukwu Mighty	Duncan Mighty
4.	"I Love My Baby"	Duncan Okechukwu Mighty	Duncan Mighty
5.	"Wobiareri"	Duncan Okechukwu Mighty	Duncan Mighty
6.	"Hustlers Anthem (Remix)"	Duncan Okechukwu Mighty	Duncan Mighty
7.	"Obianuju (Calabar Style)"	Duncan Okechukwu Mighty	Duncan Mighty
8.	"Bless Alaba" (featuring KING STUNNA, J Flex)	Duncan Okechukwu Mighty, Ikechukwu John Ogbuku	Duncan Mighty
9.	"Blow Am" (featuring Olamide)	Duncan Okechukwu Mighty, Olamide Adedeji	Duncan Mighty
10.	"Obianuju (Remix)"	Duncan Okechukwu Mighty	Duncan Mighty
11.	"Twerk For Me"	Duncan Okechukwu Mighty	Duncan Mighty
12.	"Package"	Duncan Okechukwu Mighty	Duncan Mighty
13.	"My Babe Jyrate"	Duncan Okechukwu Mighty	Duncan Mighty
14.	"Lift Him Up"	Duncan Okechukwu Mighty	Duncan Mighty
15.	"Hero In You" (featuring Thick Lips)	Duncan Okechukwu Mighty	Duncan Mighty
16.	"Radio Call"	Duncan Okechukwu Mighty	Duncan Mighty

== See also ==
- List of 2014 albums
- Music of Port Harcourt
