= Demi Grace =

English singer, songwriter and performer (born 1989)

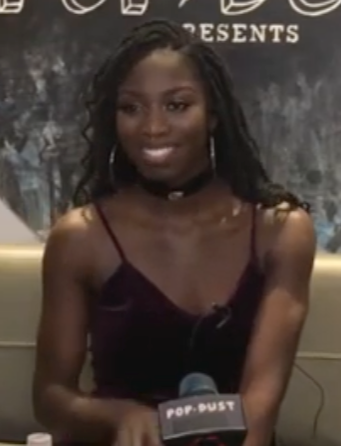
- Grace in 2018

Background information
- Born: Grace Abidemi Ayorinde; 9 November 1989 (age 36); London, United Kingdom
- Genres: Afropop; R&B; afrofusion
- Occupations: Singer, songwriter, performer, actress
- Years active: 2014–present
- Label: Universal Music Group Nigeria
- Website: demigrace.com

Grace Abidemi Ayorinde (born 9 November 1989), professionally known as Demi Grace, is a US-based model, singer, songwriter, performer and occasional actor. She made history as the first model to appear in a major hair product ad campaign for Pantene with natural dreadlocks in 2017.

== Early life ==
Grace was born in London, England to Nigerian parents. She is of Yoruba heritage. At the age of six, she and her family emigrated to the United States. She and her siblings began to take interest in the arts at a young age and her sister Deborah Ayorinde went on to become a Hollywood actor, appearing alongside Kevin Hart in the 2019 movie Fatherhood. She attended Deer Valley High School in Antioch, CA and during her time in high school, she became heavily involved in school music programs, as she joined and taught the school choir and she also performed weekly in a local fish shop.

Demi Grace began recording music under the provision of Disney Music executive, Alyssa Talovic, while she was attending college at CSU-Northridge, after which she earned a bachelor's degree in Business Management with a minor in Marketing and released her first record the year she graduated.

== Career ==
Grace began her career in music singing background for rock bands in 2008. She also began actively pursuing a career in acting and modeling and she has gone on to model for several notable brands and featured in ad campaigns. In 2014, she covered Rolling Out magazine and has also covered German magazine Trend Prive and was featured in Teen Vogue.

In 2015, "Want You", a track from her debut album Forward Movement Only was featured in the 2015 drama Phantom Halo, featuring Rebecca Romijn. In 2016, "We are Not Alone", another song from her album was featured on MTV's Real World television series.

In 2016, Grace performed alongside Beyonce at the 2016 MTV Music Video Awards and she also performed the theme song for Dark and Lovely's nationally syndicated commercial. Grace has appeared on a number of television shows, including VH1's Beverly Hills Fabulous, The Unstoppables on TLC and WeTV's LA Hair. She also had a role in a Nollywood film, Black Gold.

Grace became the Face of Sephora in 2016, and in 2017, she made history as the first model to appear in a major hair product ad campaign with natural dreadlocks, when she was cast in the 2017 ad campaign for Pantene hair products.

== Universal Music Group ==
In July 2019, she unveiled the lyric video for her debut single under the Universal Music Group, titled "Tired of You".

Grace has a publishing agreement with JTV Digital.

== Artistry ==
Grace has cited her musical influences as Janet Jackson, Grace Jones, and Missy Elliott. Her music style has been described as evolutionary, as she has sampled different sounds from the afrobeats genre, reggae, rock, pop and R&B.

== Discography ==
- "Want You" (2012)
- "Watch Me" (2012)
- "Fire it Up" (2012)
- "Bad Girl" (2012)
- "We are Not Alone" (2012)
- "Poke it Out" (2012)
- "Dream Seller" (2012)
- "Spend it All" (2012)
- "Go! Live it Up" (2014)
- "For the Girls" (2016)
- "Afraid" (2016)
- "The Dream featuring Jay Karnell" (2017)
- "Why Would You Lie" (2018)
- "Come Closer" (2018)
- "Tired of You" (2019)
- "Just Friends" (2019)
