= Fully Loaded (Koliwater) =

2009 debut album by Duncan Mighty

Studio album by Duncan Mighty
- Released: 31 May 2009
- Genre: Hip hop; reggae; rap
- Length: 78:15
- Language: English, Pidgin, Igbo
- Label: W AireMighty
- Producer: Duncan Mighty

Duncan Mighty chronology
Fully Loaded (Koliwater) (2009)	Legacy (Ahamefuna) (2011)

Fully Loaded is the debut studio album by Nigerian singer Duncan Mighty. It was released on 31 May 2009.

== Background ==
The 22-track album has a running time of 78 minutes and it features Queen of Africa, Bomba Crack, Timaya, Sandazblack, Kestabone, Nigga Raw and DJ Olu

The album was produced by award-winning producer and director D Supremo.

== Singles ==
"Ako Na Uche" was a hit single from the album Fully Loaded.

== Track listing ==
No.	Title	Length
1.	"Ako Na Uche"	5:30
2.	"Koli Water" (Featuring Queen of Africa)	3:38
3.	"Ijeoma remix" (Featuring Bomba Crack)	3:58
4.	"Incase You Never Know" (Featuring Timaya)	4:09
5.	"Onye Nkpom Hio" (Featuring Nigga Raw)	3:20
6.	"Scatter My Dada"	3:13
7.	"Welcome to My World"	2:16
8.	"Dance For Me" (Featuring Sandazblack)	4:16
9.	"Sanko Love"	3:28
10.	"Mama and Children"	0:52
11.	"Pray for Mama"	2:17
12.	"Pray for Mama Remix" (Featuring Kestabone)	4:27
13.	"Baby don't Cry" (Featuring Timaya)	5:38
14.	"Onye Ne Dum Ije"	2:06
15.	"Jesus Bu Eze"	4:03
16.	"Unu Ge Gbum Madu" (Featuring Nigga Raw)	4:15
17.	"Believe in Yourself"	2:57
18.	"Ara GA Gba Ndi Ara"	4:29
19.	"Guilty or Not Guilty"	1:29
20.	"Shake Your Body"	3:59
21.	"Ta Loso Pe" (Featuring Nigga Raw and DJ Olu)	4:03
22.	"Ijeoma Remix 2" (Featuring Bomba Crack)	2:21
Total length:		78:15

== Reception ==
Toye Sokumbi of The Native wrote that "[t]he Portharcourt first son dominated his hometown's underground for years, reaching mainstream popularity with the release of his 2009 album Fully Loaded."

The album was a major hit in Nigeria, Ghana and other African countries as both young and old people were able to vibe to it.

== See also ==
- Music of Port Harcourt
