= Waconzy =

Nigerian singer-songwriter (born 1983)

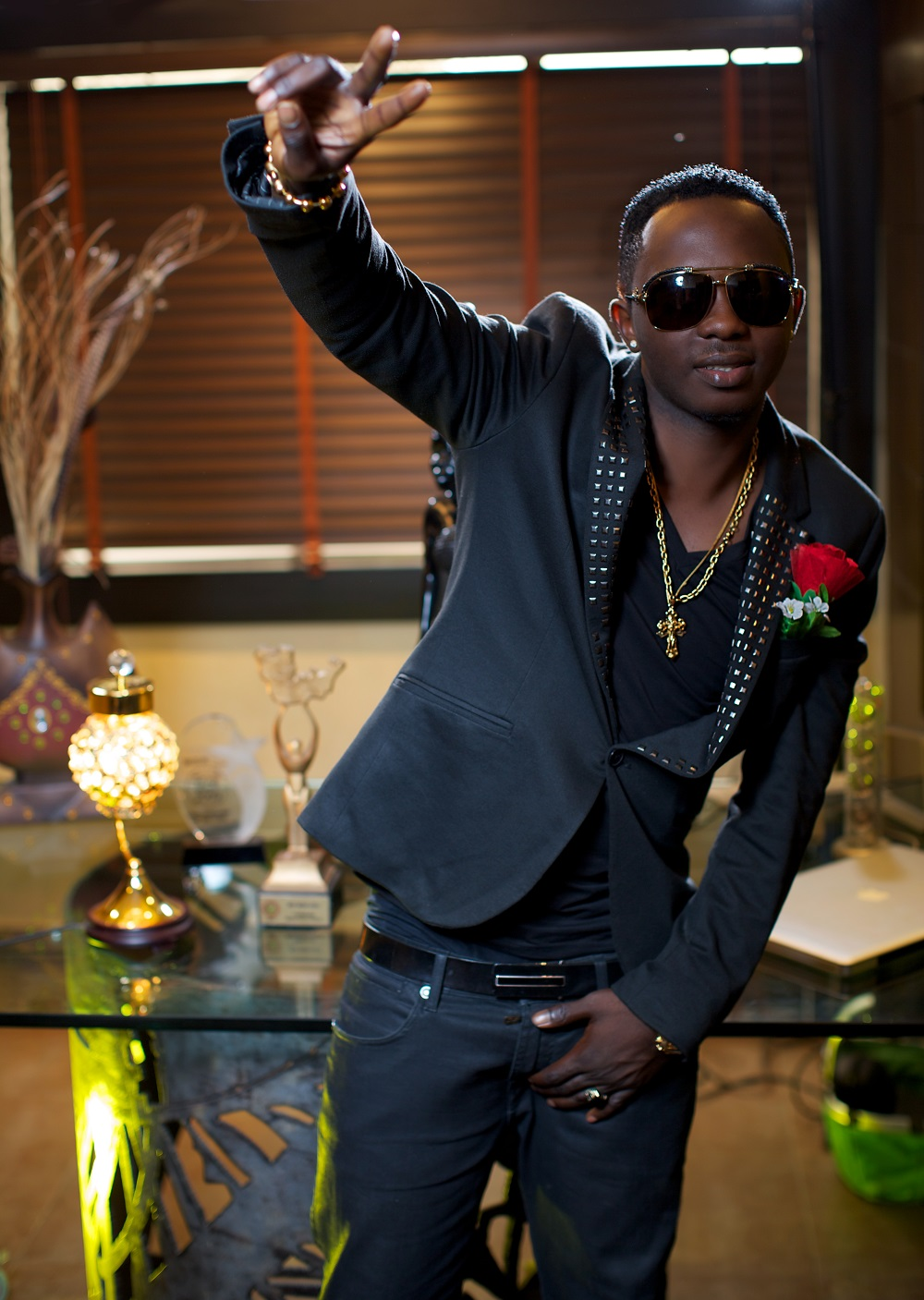

Background information
- Born: Obinna Kelvin Anyanwu; August 10, 1983 (age 43); Port Harcourt, Rivers State, Nigeria
- Origin: Umuahia, Abia State, Nigeria
- Genres: Afro pop music, pop, R&B, hip hop music, soul, reggae
- Occupations: Singer, songwriter, record producer
- Years active: 2008–present
- Label: Dv8 Media
- Website: www.waconzy.com

Obinna Kelvin Anyanwu (born in Port Harcourt, Rivers State, south-south Nigeria), better known by stage name Waconzy, is a singer, songwriter, record producer and philanthropist with family roots in Umuahia, the capital city of Abia State, southeastern Nigeria. He is the founder of Dv8 Media and the Waconzy Foundation. He rose to prominence in 2010 with his song "I Celebrate" which appeared on the I Celebrate album. His second album Money Back Guarantee was released in 2013. He is currently signed to Dv8 Media.

== Early life ==
Waconzy was born on 10 August 1983 in Port Harcourt the capital city of Rivers State and completed his primary and secondary education there. In 1998, he recorded his first song while he was still in high school. In 2000, Waconzy gained admission into the Federal University of Technology Owerri and graduated in 2005 with a Bachelor of Technology degree in project management. After completing his NYSC program in 2006, Waconzy joined the Project Management Institute in the United States where he was certified a Project Management Professional (PMP) and, in 2008, he set up his company Dv8 Media.

== Career ==
In 2008, Waconzy released the single "I Celebrate". The song's music video was shot by Clarence Peters of CAPital Dream Pictures in Lagos, Nigeria. In 2011, Waconzy collaborated with Duncan Mighty for the remix of "I Celebrate".

He released his debut album I Celebrate in 2010. The album included the singles "I Celebrate", "Too Much Money", "Wedding Day" and "Chuku Chuku".

Following his debut album, Waconzy released his album Money Back Guarantee in 2013 which featured the songs "Amosu", "Club on Fire" and "Sweet like Tombo". In 2015, he released the Waconzy Greatest Hits compilation album which featured the songs "Na God", "Balling like Waconzy (Ekpoh)" and "Ogbono".

Waconzy has made charitable contributions in Nigeria. He helped feed over a thousand poor people and kicked off the Waconzy versus Malaria Zero Tolerance campaign to fight malaria in Africa.

Waconzy has collaborated with Banky W. ("Jangolova"), Faze ("Champion"), Duncan Mighty ("I Celebrate" remix), Naeto C ("Hallelujah" remix) and Truth Hurts ("Club on Fire" remix).

== World tours and notable performances ==
=== World Tours ===
Hottest Naija Boy Alive Tour (Europe Tour) in 2014 where he was spotted with Sean Combs.

=== Notable performances ===
- MTN on the Power of Ten Concert (2011)
- Calabar Carnival (2013)
- Caribbean African American Awards (2013)
- MTN Loud in Naija Tour (2013)
- Hennessey Artistry Tour (2013)

== Discography ==
=== Singles ===
- "Ikebe super"
- "I Celebrate"
- "Hallelujah"
- "Jangolova" (featuring Banky W.)
- "Fine Fine Girl"
- "Jogodo"
- "Club on Fire"
- "Oh No (I CRY)"
- "Amosu"
- "Sweet Like Tombo" (featuring Chimaga)
- "Club on Fire (Remix)" (featuring Truth Hurts)
- "My Money Dey Talk" (featuring Chimaga)
- "Champion" (featuring Faze)
- "Ekpoh"
- "Ogbono"
- "Na God"
- "Am Sorry"
- "Amosu (Remix)" (featuring Rhage, Heyden Adama & Shadow Boxxer)
- "Pitakwa"
- "Nothing Last Forever"
- "Let Me Love you"
- "Apple Of My Eyes"

=== Albums ===
- I Celebrate (2010)
- Money Back Guarantee (2013)
- Waconzy: Greatest Hits (2015)

== Awards and nominations ==
Year	Awards ceremony	Award description(s)	Results
2009	Glitz Awards	Song of The Year (Ikebe Super)	Won
2010	Odudu Awards	Artist of The Year (Himself)	Won
2010	Odudu Awards	Song of the year (I celebrate)	Won
2010	Odudu Awards	Naija Urban (Male)	Won
2010	Odudu Awards	Best Collaboration ('ft. Ibz, Drill, Big mouth – Too Much Money')	Won
2011	NigerDelta Advancement Awards	Video of the Year (I Celebrate)	Won
2012	City People Entertainment Awards	Best Raggae/Dancehall artiste (I Celebrate Remix)	Nominated
2013	Blue print Awards	Best indigenous Artist of the year (Amosu)	Won
2013	F.A.C.E Awards	International Artist of the year {Himself}	Nominated
2014	New Media Awards	Best use of Social Media NGO (Waconzy's Silver spoon foundation)	Nominated
2015	NIGER DELTA ADVANCEMENT AWARDS	BEST MUSIC VIDEO DIRECTOR (MEXfor Amosu)	Pending
2015	NIGER DELTA ADVANCEMENT AWARDS	VIDEO OF THE YEAR(Amosu)	Pending
2015	NIGER DELTA ADVANCEMENT AWARDS	NIGER DELTA ARTISTE OF THE YEAR (Himself)	Pending

=== Awarded ===
At the 2013 6th Annual World Music and Independent Film Festival in Hollywood, Waconzy was honoured with a humanitarian award for his contribution to the fight against malaria in Africa through his 'Waconzy Versus Malaria Zero Tolerance' campaign.

== See also ==
- List of Nigerian musicians
- List of people from Port Harcourt
