= Ignatius Kattey =

Anglican bishop in Nigeria

The Most Reverend Ignatius Kattey
- Archbishop of Niger Delta, Bishop of Niger Delta North
- Church: Church of Nigeria
- Diocese: Diocese of Niger Delta North

Orders
- Ordination: 1986
- Consecration: 2009 by Peter Akinola

Personal details
- Born: 1948 (age 77–78) Alode, Rivers State

Ignatius Crosby Ogborun Kattey (born Alode, Rivers State, 23 August 1948) is a Nigerian Anglican archbishop. His father was Chief Amos Kattey of the Nchia Kingdom of Eleme, and a devout Christian. He is married to Beatrice Goa Kattey with seven children.

== Early life and education ==
He attended St. Paul's Catholic School in Obigbo, now called Oyigbo, where he did primary school studies from 1954 to 1959. He also attended the National High School, in Aba, since 1962. He studied at Ahmadu Bello University in Aba, graduating in Mechanical Engineering in 1976. He obtained a Post Graduate Diploma in Education at the University of Benin in 1986 and a Masters of Education degree in Guidance and Counselling at the University of Port Harcourt in 1989.

== Religious life and career ==
Kattey became a born-again Christian in 1971 due to the ministry of the Scripture Union. He would be Zonal Representative of the Scripture Union. He was ordained a priest of the Church of Nigeria in 1986. He was priest at St. Stephen's Anglican Church in the Bori Local Government Area. He was sent by Bishop Samuel Elenwo to start a new church, that would be St. Mark's Anglican Church, in Borokiri, Port Harcourt, in the Diocese of the Niger Delta. He moved to be vicar and superintendent of St. John's Anglican Church, in Rumueme, in 1994, where he did a remarkable work. He became archdeacon of the newly created Eleme Archdeaconry in 1995. Kattey was nominated Principal of the School of Ordination of the Diocese of the Niger Delta North, in 1996, later Staff Development Center, where he was director.

He held several important offices at the Church of Nigeria until being nominated Episcopal Administrator of the Diocese of Uyo, which he was from October to December 2004.

Kattey was elected the first Archbishop of the newly created Ecclesiastical Province of Niger Delta at the General Synod of the Church of Nigeria, held in Abuja, in September 2008. He was consecrated as Archbishop of Niger Delta Province at the Holy Trinity Cathedral, in Lokoja, on 23 May 2009. He is also Bishop of the Diocese of Niger Delta North, and took over from Ephraim Ademowo as Dean of the Church of Nigeria in 2015.

Kattey and his wife were kidnapped from their home in Port Harcourt, on 6 September 2013. His wife was released soon after. The kidnap took place not for religious reasons but for a ransom. The Church of Nigeria refused to pay any ransom for his release. Kattey would be freed on 14 September 2013, near Port Harcourt, in a stable condition.

He was one of the members of the large Church of Nigeria delegation that attended GAFCON II, held in Nairobi, Kenya, from 21 to 26 October 2013.

He retired in 2018, having reached the age of 70.

Kattey published Ordination of Women: Give Them a Chance (1992) and Handbook on Biblical Preaching (1992).

== See also ==
- Church of Nigeria
- List of people from Port Harcourt
