= Universal Music Group Nigeria =

Record label in Nigeria

Universal Music West Africa
- Industry: Entertainment, media, music
- Genre: Afrobeats, Pop, Hip-hop
- Founded: 2017
- Headquarters: Lagos, Nigeria
- Area served: West Africa
- Key people: Sipho Dlamin
- Parent: Universal Music Group
- Website: universalmusic.ng

Universal Music West Africa (formerly marketed as Universal Music Group Nigeria) is the West African division of the global record label Universal Music Group. Founded in 2017, it has its corporate headquarters located in Victoria Island, Lagos, Nigeria. The label has signed at least seventeen artists from various African countries. UMGNG is engaged in recorded music, music publishing, merchandising, and audiovisual content.

In 2020, Billboard Magazine named UMG Nigeria as one of The Gatekeepers of the Nigerian music industry.

== History ==
Universal Music Group Nigeria was founded on 17 July 2018, as a flagship of Universal Music Group, and a division of Universal Music Africa. Following the launching of the imprint, UMG appoint's Ezegozie Eze Jr., the former executive at South African-based music station, Channel O, as the General Manager of Universal Music Group Nigeria. UMGNG began operation with WurlD, Odunsi (the Engine), Tay Iwar, Cina Soul and Stonebwoy, as its first recording artist. The label also signed Mr Eazi, co-signed Tekno in conjunction with Island Records UK and Vanessa Mdee in conjunction with AfroForce1 Records, Universal Music Central Europe, and Universal Music South Africa.

On 30 April 2019, Demi Grace joined Universal Music Group Nigeria artist roaster. On 8 November 2019, Idahams signed with Universal Music Group Nigeria, in conjunction with Grafton Entertainment. Shortly after the announcement, he released his first single "Billion Dollar", under Universal Music Group Nigeria.

=== 2020s ===
Ezegozie Eze Jr. served as the general manager of Universal Music Group Nigeria since 2017 and stepped down from his position in the second quarter of 2020. Eze participated in the signing of WurlD, Odunsi (the Engine), Tay Iwar, Cina Soul, Stonebwoy, Mr Eazi, Tekno, Vanessa Mdee, Demi Grace, Idahams, IDYL, Larry Gaaga, Alpha P, Tomi Owó, Nonso Bassey, and Nasty C, to Universal Music Group Nigeria. In 2020, Chinedu Okeke, the co-founder of Gidi Culture Festival, and Eclipse Live Africa assumed control over the label until an announcement commenced on 4 January 2021, appointing him, as the general manager of Universal Music Group Nigeria, and resigned from his position in August 2021.

== UMG and music licensing ==
=== UMG and Boomplay ===
In 2018, Universal Music Group announced a multi-year licensing agreement with Boomplay – a major African music digital download and streaming service. The licensing agreement enabled Boomplay to stream UMGNG's music catalog across several African states including Cameroon, Côte d'Ivoire, Ghana, Kenya, Nigeria, Rwanda, Senegal, Tanzania, Uganda, Malawi and Zambia.

=== UMG and uduX ===
In 2019, UMG became the first major music company to license its substantial music catalog to uduX music, a platform that offers its users access to high-quality music and videos. The partnership between the service and the label is intended to extend the reach of Universal Music Group and make the music of its global recording artists more accessible.

== UMGNG business divisions ==
Universal Music Group Nigeria operates business divisions that co-exist with its music, music publishing, and audiovisual content divisions. These units include ULive Africa (the live events and production company), UMG Live Africa (the talent booking and management division) and UMGB (the creative and brand partnerships division).

=== ULive Africa ===
ULive Africa, founded in 2016, is a promotes, produces, and invests in live entertainment. The entity is engaged in staging, programming, producing, and hosting large-scale events and live concerts. In 2018, ULive Africa produced the Lagos leg of the Major Lazer Soundsystem Live tour, as well as Adekunle Gold’s three-night residency at Terra Kulture titled AG Live.

=== UMG Live Africa ===
UMG Live Africa was launched in 2017 in Johannesburg, South Africa. It is the talent and booking management division of Universal Music Group and consists of both UMG and non-UMG artists.

=== UMGB ===
Universal Music Group and Brands (UMGB) is the creative and brand partnerships division of Universal Music Group.

== Managing Directors ==
- Ezegozie Eze Jr. (2017–2020)
- Chinedu Okeke (acting, 2020–2021)

== Roster ==
- Davido
- Cina Soul
- Demi Grace
- Idahams
- IDYL
- Irene Ntalé
- Jinmi Abduls
- Juls
- Alpha P
- KiDi
- Larry Gaaga
- Naiboi
- Nonso Bassey
- Odunsi (The Engine)
- Stonebwoy
- Tekno
- TMXO
- Tomi Owo
- Vanessa Mdee
- Vector
- WurlD
