= Mr 2Kay =

Nigerian singer and songwriter (born 1988)

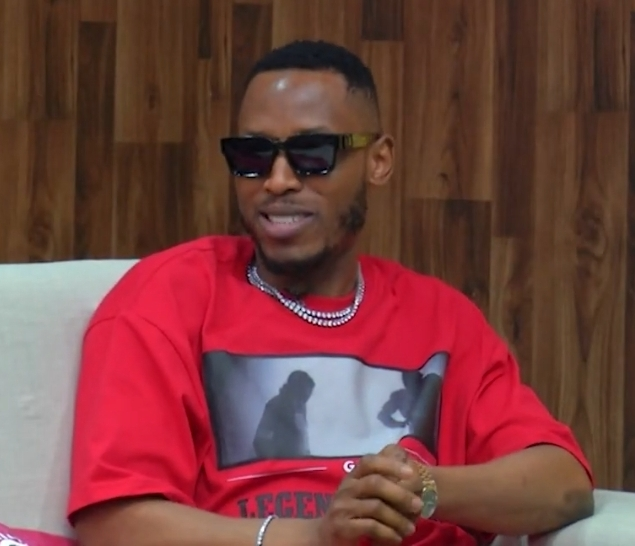

Background information
- Born: Abinye David Jumbo; February 11, 1988 (age 38); Port Harcourt, Rivers State Nigeria
- Origin: Rivers State, Nigeria
- Genre: Afro pop music
- Occupations: Singer, songwriter, performer
- Years active: 2010–present
- Label: Better Life Entertainment

Abinye David Jumbo (born 11 February 1988), known by his stage name Mr 2Kay, is a Nigerian singer and songwriter. He was formally signed by Grafton Entertainment, but left the label in 2018 to start his own imprint, Better Life Entertainment.

== Early life ==
Mr 2Kay was born in Port Harcourt. After his birth, his family moved to Bonny Island, Rivers State, south-south Nigeria, where he grew up. Mr 2Kay was also a good artist as he drew portraits growing up.

== Career ==
Mr 2Kay started his music career in Port Harcourt and his break-out single from Port Harcourt was "Waterside Boy", released 21 August 2011 under Grafton Entertainment, but he did not gain international attention until 2012 when he released "Bubugaga" which was his international break out single. "Bubugaga" was released on 8 October 2012. The music video for "Bubugaga" was shot in London, UK and directed by Nosa Igbinedion under Grafton Entertainment.

== Personal life ==
=== Robbery ===
On 25 October 2017, Mr 2Kay was reportedly robbed by four armed men in his hotel room at Eko Hotels and Suites at Victoria Island, Lagos after performing at 2Baba's Buckwyld and Breathless Concert, which took place at the convention centre of Eko Hotel. 2Kay was left with injuries sustained from the robbery. One week after the robbery, Mr 2Kay released a new single "Pray for Me" which was scheduled for a late November release. His label, Grafton Records, had to push back the album release date. On 7 November 2017, Mr 2Kay reportedly filed a $500 million lawsuit against the management of Eko Hotels and Suites where the incident happened in October.

== Notable performances ==
He has performed in several popular events and shows since his rise to stardom, performed in events like:

- Factory78 TV – Mr 2Kay Performs Bubugaga Live / Face-off interview in 2012
- Afrobeats London Party at Coronet in 2014.
- Carniriv Closing Ceremony In 2014.
- Prestigious London Jazz cafe IN 2014.
- All Africa Music Awards (AFRIMA) At Industry Nite in 2015.

=== Concert tour ===
On Sunday, 17 June 2018, at Aztech Arcum Stadium Road Port Harcourt, Rivers State Nigeria. Mr 2Kay kickoff with his album concert "Elevated" features guest artist, radio host/hype man & disc jockeys Timaya, Duncan Mighty, Harrysong, Charles Okocha, DJ Jimmy Jatt, DJ Neptune, DJ Big N, DJ Kev, Joenell, Ayi, Real Prince, Idahams, Doray, Young GreyC, Squeeze Tarela, Legendary Sunny, Ajebo Hustlers, King Perryy, M Trill, Korkormikor, Olisa Adibua, Shope Shopsy and Alex from Big Brother Naija (season 3). The concert was recorded sold out with a capacity of over two thousand seats. Tickets were sold from two to five hundred thousand Nigerian naira.

Mr 2Kay posted on his social media pages on 2 April 2018, to announce a singing/dancing competition where he'll be giving away $2000 (Two Thousand Dollars) to 2 persons in Port Harcourt.

According to him, the initiative is a way of giving back to his starting foundation in the music industry. "Call it my little way of giving back to a place where I started my career."

== Awards and nominations ==
Year	Awards ceremony	Award description(s)	Results
2014	Nigeria Entertainment Awards	Diaspora Artiste Of The Year	Nominated
2014	PNA Youth Award	Next Rated	Won
2014	Nigeria Entertainment Awards	Diaspora Artist of the Year	Nominated
2015	Nigeria Entertainment Awards	Best Collabo of The Year (Bad Girl Special Remix)	Won
2015	Niger Delta Advancement Awards	Artiste Of The Year	Won
2015	Niger Delta Advancement Awards	Song Of The Year (Bad girl special)	Won
2015	Niger Delta Advancement Awards	Video Of The Year {Bad girl special}	Won
2015	The Headies	Best Reggae/Dancehall Single (Bad Girl Special (Remix))	Nominated

== See also ==
- Music of Port Harcourt
- List of Nigerian musicians
