= Geraldo Pino =

Sierra Leonean musician (1934–2008)

Gerald Emeka Pine, better known as Geraldo Pino (1 February 1934 - 9 November 2008), was a Sierra Leonean musician. He was one of the early pioneers of modern African pop music.

Born in 1934 in Freetown, Sierra Leone to a Sierra Leone Creole family, Pino was the son of a Sierra Leonean lawyer, and a mother who died when he was young. He co-founded the Heartbeats in the 1960s and was Chairman of the Performing Musicians Association of Nigeria Rivers State Branch from 1995 to 2004. He died of illness in Port Harcourt on 9 November 2008.
