= Yibo Koko =

Nigerian film maker, art director, and producer

Rivers State Tourism Development Agency Yibo Koko Yibo Koko in 2013
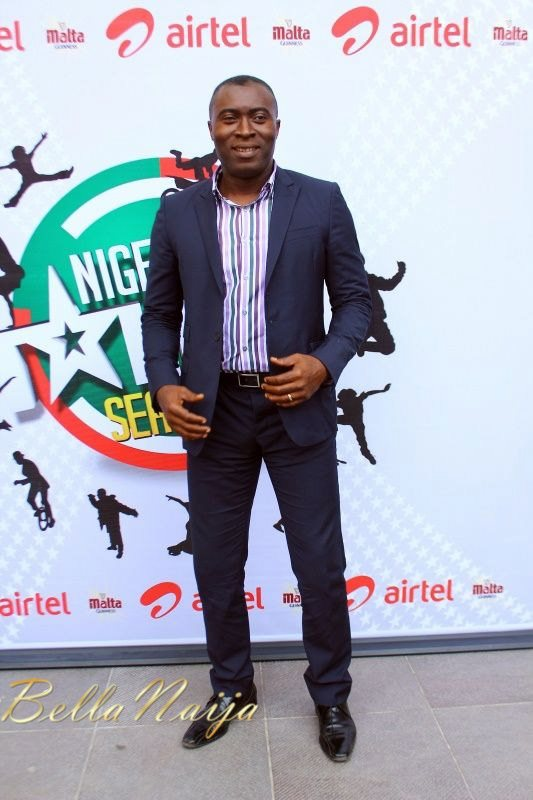
- Born: February 2, 1967 (age 59); Port Harcourt
- Citizenship: Nigerian
- Education: University of Port Harcourt, New York Film Academy, Oxford University
- Occupations: CEO, Film director, Producer, Actor, Art and Creative Director
- Years active: 1991 - present
- Known for: Seki Dance Drama, Directors-General Rivers State Tourism Development Agency, Nigeria's Got Talent; Head of Productions Africa Magic Nigeria
- Notable work: Seki Dance Drama, https://www.instagram.com/p/B5FrsNMFTEf/?igshid=dero6y3kg1st
- Television: Nigeria’s Got Talent
- Height: 6 ft 3 in (191 cm)
- Term: 2012 - 2014
- Spouse: Kelechi Koko
- Children: 3
- Website: www.rstda.org, www.sekidance.org

Yibo Koko is a Nigerian film maker, art director, creative artist and producer. Koko created the Seki Dance Drama, telling the story of the Rivers State people through dance. He is the Director General of the Rivers State Tourism Development Agency and a voting member of the Nigerian Oscar selection committee
