= Rivers State Ministry of Culture and Tourism =

Ministry overview
- Jurisdiction: Government of Rivers State
- Headquarters: 6th Floor, Block B, State Secretariat; Port Harcourt, Rivers State, Nigeria; 4°46′22″N 7°1′1″E
- Ministry executives: Tonye Briggs-Oniyide, Commissioner; Chief Barinuah Keenam, Permanent Secretary

The Rivers State Ministry of Culture and Tourism is a government ministry of Rivers State, Nigeria entrusted with the formulation and implementation of policies to promote culture and tourism with a view to stimulating economic growth in the state. The ministry's mandate is to "Put in place programmes and events that attract international, national and local tourists."

== Vision ==
The Ministry of Culture and Tourism states that its vision (and mission) is:

To promote the diverse cultural heritage of Rivers’ people and to identify and develop the tourism potentials of the State as a means of job creation, wealth generation as well inculcating pride and dignity in our local art work and cultural values. This is to establish and brand Rivers State a choiced destination for cultural tourism beside oil and gas.

== Objectives ==
The Ministry of Culture and Tourism has the following objectives:

1. To draw immediate attention to tourism development in Rivers State.
2. To provide leisure and recreational faculties in the local government areas of the state.
3. To reawaken interest and active participation of all stakeholders in the development of Rivers State culture towards economic well-being of the people.
4. To identify the cultural diversity and heritage of the state for proper management and utilization.
5. To regulate, categorize, standardize and control hotels, restaurants, fast foods, travel agencies, four operators and other tourism related enterprises.
6. To provide enabling environment for the development of traditional small scale/cottage enterprises for domestic and export promotion.

== See also ==
- List of government ministries of Rivers State
- Rivers State Tourism Development Agency
