= Ajuri Ngelale =

Nigerian journalist and politician

Nigerian presidential spokesman
- In office 31 July 2023 – 7 September 2024
- Preceded by: Femi Adesina

Personal details
- Born: November 13, 1986 (age 39) Platteville, Wisconsin, United States
- Education: University of Kansas
- Occupation: Journalist

Ajuri Obari Ngelale (born 13 November 1986) is a Nigerian broadcast journalist and politician who served as presidential spokesman to president Bola Tinubu. He previously served as presidential senior special adviser on public affairs to former president Muhammadu Buhari and was a co-principal spokesperson of Bola Tinubu presidential campaign council for the 2023 Nigerian general election which they won. He was a senior reporter and presenter at Africa Independent Television (AIT) and Channels Television.

== Early life and education ==
Ngelale was born in Platteville, Wisconsin, United States to a Nigerian father of Eleme origin, Chief Precious Osaro Ngelale and German-American mother Diane who served as social welfare director of the Rivers State Government under Governor Melford Okilo. His father was a geologist and politician who was elected to the Rivers State House of Assembly in the Third Republic and served until General Muhammadu Buhari's military coup of 1983. Following the military coup, his family moved to the United States in 1985. After the return of civilian rule in 1999, his father was appointed to the federal cabinet as a minister. Ngelale earned a bachelor's degree majoring in political science and history from the University of Kansas in Lawrence, Kansas, US. He returned to Nigeria in 2011 to participate in the mandatory one-year National Youth Service Corps (NYSC).

== Career ==
Ngelale started journalism career as a youth corps member at Africa Independent Television where he was deployed for his one-year national service. After completing his national service, he was retained by AIT as an investigative reporter and later served as a news editor, producer and presenter from 2011 to 2016. At AIT, he produced two critically acclaimed public affairs documentary series State of the Nation (2012) and Diary from the Delta (2016). He left AIT in 2016 and joined Channels Television where he served as a co-anchor of popular public policy discussion program Sunrise Daily and in partnership with the United States Government's Mandela Washington Fellowship, produced and presented Africa's Future Leaders which documented young African leaders uplifting disadvantaged population through their individual efforts.

In 2019, he resigned from Channels TV to become lead media content producer for the All Progressives Congress (APC) Next Level Presidential Campaign for the reelection of President Muhammadu Buhari under Buhari/Osinbajo presidential campaign organization. Following their victory at the poll in 2019, President Buhari appointed Ngelale as his senior special adviser on public affairs and served in this position till 2023 when Buhari left office. In October 2022, Ngelale was appointed co-principal spokesperson of Tinubu-Shettima Presidential campaign Organization. He appeared frequently on national radio and TV, and international media including CNN, BBC and Al-Jazeera. On 31 July 2023, President Bola Tinubu appointed Ngelale his official spokesperson. On 19 May 2024, President Tinubu appointed Ngelale as the first special presidential envoy on climate action for the Federal Republic of Nigeria. He was also appointed as the chairman of the Presidential Steering Committee on Project Evergreen, Nigeria's first green industrial zone and as secretary of the Presidential Committee on Climate Action and Green Economic Solutions, chaired by President Tinubu.

On 7 September 2024, Ngelale resigned indefinitely from his role as the presidential spokesman for President Tinubu to address medical issues affecting his immediate family. However, news outlets in the country have reported that the resignation was out of fear of being fired.
