= Ajebo Hustlers =

Nigerian music duo

- Origin: Nigeria
- Genres: Afrobeats; Highlife
- Years active: 2015–present
- Members: Piego; Knowledge

Bad boy Ajebo Hustlers is a Nigerian Afrobeats and Highlife music duo composed of Piego (Isaiah Precious) and Knowledge (George Dandeson), a rapper. They were nominated for the 2022 Headies Awards for Songwriter of the Year and won the Best Duo at the Soundcity MVP Awards in 2023.

== Career ==
Piego and Knowledge met while working at a restaurant in Port Harcourt, Nigeria. They officially formed the group in 2015 following the release of their single "Bole and Fish Remix."

In 2020, they gained recognition after the release of their single "Barawo" produced by 1da Banton, and the remix featuring Davido. Their 2021 single "Pronto," featuring Omah Lay debuted on the TurnTable Top 50 charts.

In early 2021, Apple Music selected Ajebo Hustlers as part of Nigeria's local 'Up Next' program, which spotlights rising artists. Their debut studio album, Kpos Lifestyle, Vol. 1 was released the same year.

== Discography ==
=== Albums ===
- Kpos Lifestyle, Vol. 1 (2021)

=== Extended plays ===
Title	Extended play details
Bad Boy Etiquette 101	Released: 9 December 2022; Label: Avante Entertainment; Format: Digital download, streaming
Bad Boy Etiquette 102: Continuous Assessment	Released: 3 May 2024; Label: Avante Entertainment; Format: Digital download, streaming

=== Singles ===
Year	Title	Album
2020	"Barawo"	Kpos Lifestlye, Vol. 1
2020	"Symbiosis"	Kpos Lifestlye, Vol. 1
2021	"Pronto"	Kpos Lifestlye, Vol. 1
2021	"Yafun Yafun"	Kpos Lifestlye, Vol. 1
2021	"Loyalty"	Bad Boys Etiquette 101
2022	"In Love" (with Fave)	Bad Boys Etiquette 101
2023	"No Wam"	Bad Boy Etiquette 102: Continuous Assessment
2024	Celine Dion (with Odumodublvck)	Bad Boy Etiquette 102: Continuous Assessment

== Awards and nominations ==
Year	Award	Category	Nominee/work	Result	Ref
2022	The Headies	Songwriter of the Year	Ajebo Hustlers	Nominated	
2022	The Headies	Best Afrobeats Album	"Kpos Lifestyle, Vol. 1"	Nominated	
2023	Soundcity MVP Awards	Best Duo	Ajebo Hustlers	Won	
