= Muma Gee =

Nigerian singer-songwriter and actress (born 1978)

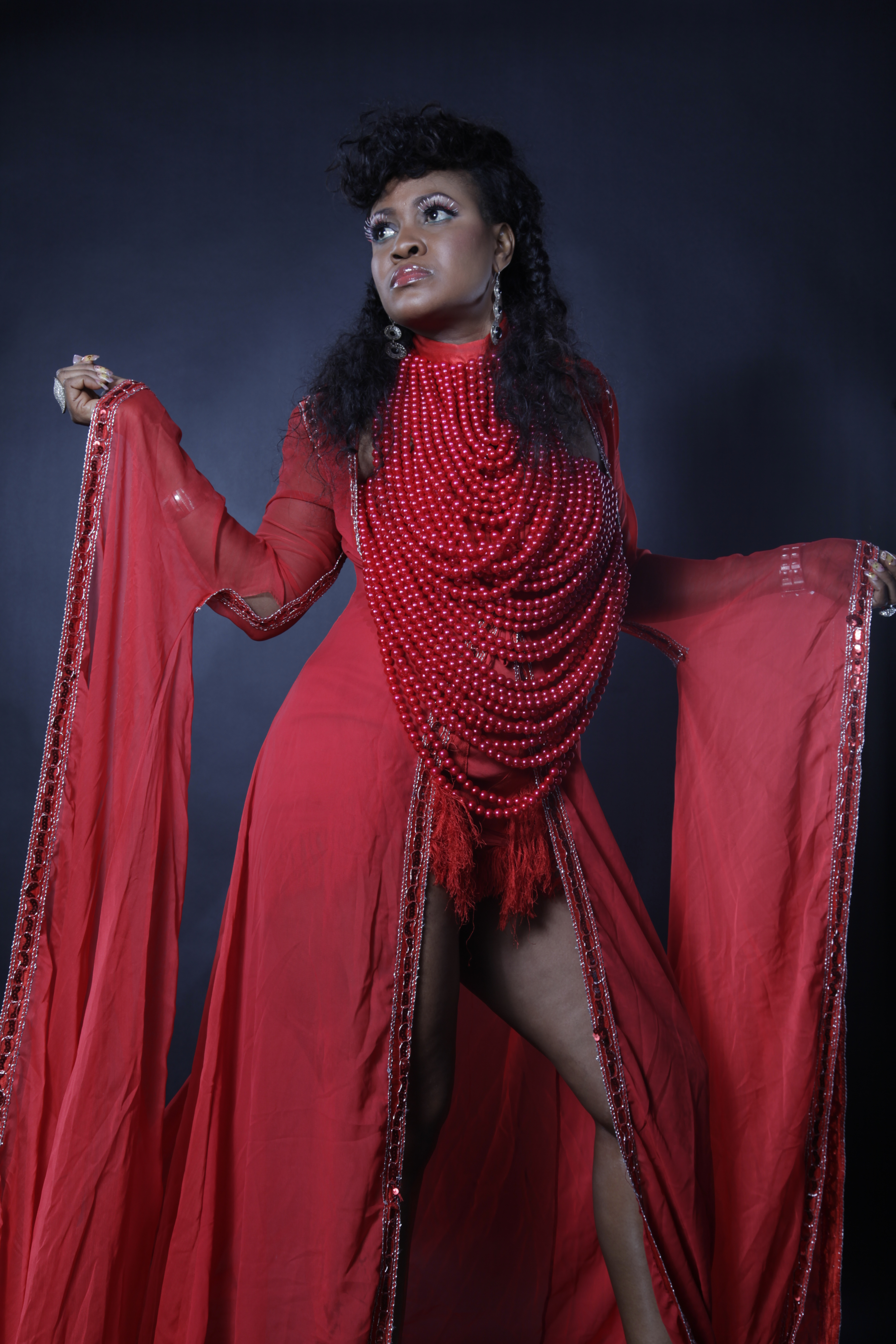
- Born: 18 November 1978 (age 47); Port Harcourt, Rivers, Nigeria
- Education: University of Port Harcourt
- Occupations: Actress; businesswoman; fashion designer; politician; singer-songwriter; television personality
- Years active: 2004—present
- Political party: People's Democratic Party (PDP)
- Spouse: Prince Eke (m. 2011)
- Children: 3
- Musical career
- Genres: African pop; reggae; world; afro soul
- Instrument: Vocals
- Labels: Black Attraction Productions; Mgee Records; Geeklips Entertainment
- Website: mumagee.com

Gift Iyumame Eke (née Uwame; born 18 November 1978), professionally known as Muma Gee (/muːmə dʒiː/), meaning "do good Gift", is a Nigerian singer-songwriter, actress, businesswoman, fashion designer, television personality and politician. She was born, raised, and resides in Port Harcourt. Uwame's first taste of stardom came through her song "Kade", which became the title track of her first official album, released in 2006. The single's accompanying music video directed by Wudi Awa, received five nominations, including two from the AMEN Awards (Best Picture and Best Costume) and one each from the Nigerian Music Video Awards, the Headies Awards, and the Sound City Music Video Awards.

Uwame rose to prominence in 2010 as a contestant on the celebrity edition of Nigerian reality TV series Gulder Ultimate Search. Prior to entering the show, she had worked on her second studio album The Woman in Question, that would be released a day after her eviction. "Amebo" and "African Juice" were the two singles released from the album. Uwame had also collaborated with artists and producers such as Samini, VIP, OJB, Cobhams Asuquo and Terry G, among others. In 2009, she was nominated for four awards at the 3rd Nigerian Music Video Awards. In early 2012, Uwame started work on a new album called Motherland and has since released singles "Port Harcourt Is Back", "African Woman Skilashy" and "Jikele". As an actress, she starred in the Nollywood films Last Dance (2006), Solid Affection (2008), Secret Code (2011), and The Code (2011). Among her accomplishments are numerous titles and honours such as, Oonyon 1 of Upata Kingdom, Queen of African music, Pop Queen, and Mrs. Ngor-Okpala.

Uwame's social life and alleged relationships have gained widespread coverage in the media, with the most prominent being her emotional affair with former GUS campmate Emeka Ike. In 2011, Uwame married actor Prince Eke, and gave birth to a twin boy and girl, on 18 April 2014.

== Early life ==
Born in Port Harcourt, Rivers State to Ekpeye parents, Uwame grew up in a strict Christian household, the third of six children. Her father, who was involved in Military Medicine, died when she was a child. After her father's death, Uwame was raised by her mother in the Seventh-day Adventist Church. Uwame always liked music and was trained by her mother to sing songs at the age of 4.

Upon finishing her primary and secondary school education in Abuja, Uwame enrolled at the University of Port Harcourt and earned a degree in Theatre Arts. In addition to her academic background, she owned and operated numerous other busia nesses including vehicle leasing company, restaurant, tailor shop and beauty salon. She also became part of Port Harcourt's burgeoning music scene, performing at nightclubs and inner city bars.

== Career ==
=== 2006: Kade ===
Moving to Lagos, Muma Gee settled in Surulere, a residential and commercial area of that city. Shortly after, she met record producer Nelson Brown. Brown was instrumental in putting together most of the songs on Muma Gee's debut full-length. In 2006, the album, entitled Kade was released as a CD to music stores Muma Gee had explained the meaning of its title in an interview, "it is a courageous word that gives hope". I believe so much in empowerment. So Kade represents advocacy and empowerment towards nation building [...] For example, in my language, we say Kade, meaning go, but its typical meaning is; keep moving on and you will get there someday." Following the release of the aforementioned album, Wudi Awa was contacted by Muma Gee in regards to producing a music video for its title track single. Soon after the video was shot, edited and sent to TV stations, it quickly gained popularity, capturing the attention of music lovers in Nigeria. Kade would later be nominated for AMEN Awards, Nigerian Music Video Awards, The Headies Awards, and Sound City Music Video Awards.

=== 2007–2010: Star Trek, The, Woman in Question and Gulder Ultimate Search ===
In June 2007, Muma Gee performed at the annual Nigerian Breweries-sponsored Star Trek music tour. She was the only female solo artist called upon to sing at the last leg of the national tour. The concert was held at the Hotel Presidential venue in Enugu and featured a star-studded line-up of Nigerian musicians, including P-Square, Daddy Showkey, Davina, and Shine Band, among others. Muma Gee appeared on stage wearing a beaded blouse and a black, rippling skirt. She involved a group of male fans into a dance competition for a chance to win her love. The climax of her show came when she hugged, cuddled and attempted to have a liplock with the winner in public. The young male fan also was treated to a love song she belted out before closing her set with a performance of her hit track "Kade".

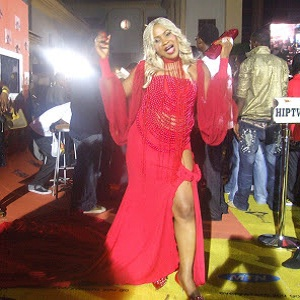
Muma Gee at The Headies Awards, March 2008

By the end of 2007, she began hinting that she was working on new material for her next album. The following year, on 18 May 2008, it was announced that "Amebo" would be the first single to be released from the album. According to Muma Gee, this song was what she had long desired to create: "I have been doing my own thing. I've been experimenting even while at the University of Port Harcourt. Now, I want to see what I can achieve professionally." Explaining what "Amebo" was specifically about, she says, "I am a homegirl, I am an indigenous musician. I believe so much in Nigeria. So, "Amebo" simply talks about our people, our values, and our heritage." On 25 May, Muma Gee premiered the song at an exclusive night party in Ikoyi. Other roles she played at the event included meeting fans, and signing autographs. "Amebo" was sent to radio afterwards; Muma Gee also spoke briefly about the new album's content and direction, saying, "I figured out that there are lots of love songs in the album. Maybe I am learning the rules to falling in love. (Laughs) and it's finding interest in my songwriting, maybe, maybe not, well I am not sure." In 2009, Muma Gee released the album's second single "African Juice" and its accompanying music video, the latter of which earned her several nominations at that year's Nigerian Music Video Awards. On 26 February 2010, Vanguard announced that Muma Gee's second studio album was titled The Woman in Question and that it would be released in March. Along with these details, it was announced Muma Gee had songs with Samini, VIP, and Terry G on the album and that producers on the album would include Cobhams Asuquo, Puffy T, Terry G and OJB.

Beginning March 2010, Muma Gee appeared in the reality television show Gulder Ultimate Search. She had been selected with nine other celebrity participants. After being sent to the jungle, she naturally connected with fellow campmate Emeka Ike. However, their extra-closeness soon prompted viewers to believe their friendship was beyond platonic. Various news outlets and gossip sites depicted Ike as a handsome married actor, with whom Muma Gee was romantically lovestruck. It was further alleged that the pair engaged in lewd conduct during a bathroom scene on the show. Muma Gee admitted to an emotional relationship with her campmate but denied the sex allegations. In another incident, contestant Chioma Chukwuka defied Muma Gee and threw her property out of their tent. She had verbally attacked Muma Gee on several occasions at the camp and made disparaging remarks about her marital status. Throughout their time in the Jungle, both contestants rivalled each other. They were evicted on the same day for not being able to complete their respective tasks. Uwame's The Woman in Question was released the next day. On 8 May 2010, in an interview with Nigeriafilms.com, Chukwuka claimed her actions against Muma Gee were deliberate and a mere display of her blatant side. During June 2010, Muma Gee was invited for Thanksgiving at the Redeemed Christian Church, by Gus winner Emeka Ike and his wife Emma. There, she met and befriended up-and-coming Nollywood actor Prince Eke—Ike's best friend—whom she felt was God-sent and who would propose to her seconds later. On 23 June, Uwame received an engagement ring from Eke shortly after he had arrived safely from work. She would then wed him the following year.

=== 2011–present: Marriage and Motherland ===
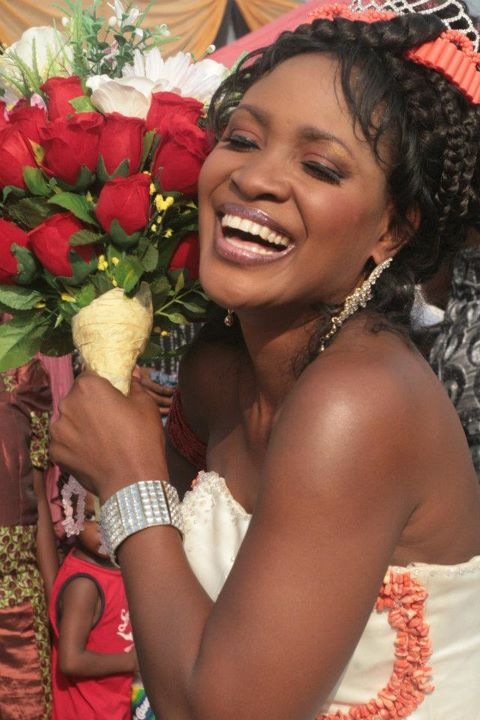
Muma Gee, December 2011

On 23 July 2011, reports surfaced announcing the date for Muma Gee and Eke's White wedding as 18 November, and venue at Recovery House, Port Harcourt International Church. In August 2011, Muma Gee was reported to have moved temporarily from Lagos back to Port Harcourt to participate in politics. Although no further details were released about the development at the time. She would later reveal in interviews that there were no political intentions behind her relocation to the city. On 6 September 2011, Muma Gee revealed that the wedding was undergoing its final adjustments. However, on 4 November 2011, the couple decided to push back the wedding date to work on Muma Gee's music video, "Port Harcourt Is Back". On 20 December 2011, Muma Gee and Prince Eke were married in a double traditional wedding ceremony in Ahoada East and Ngor Okpala respectively. A formal white wedding later took place on 23 December 2011 in Port Harcourt. After her marriage to Eke, Muma Gee continued to work on her music career. In February 2012, she released "Port Harcourt Is Back" and its music video, which was directed by her husband Prince Eke. Speaking about the concept of the song, she explained "It's a single and more of appreciation for the transformation in my birthplace." Furthermore, Muma Gee stated that her new album called Motherland was in the making, and that "it was inspired by what I experienced when I went to Port Harcourt after many years in Lagos. It is warm and welcoming." On 8 April that same year, the album's second single "African Woman Skillashy" followed. The music video, directed by Bobby Hai Ndackson was released soon after. Muma Gee told Vanguard that "[the song] is all about the African woman, her beauty and how she makes herself beautiful. An African woman is therefore not to be messed up with or looked down upon because she's feminine. Even though she's beautiful, she's strong and has a sense of pride."

In March 2013, she released "Jikele" as the album's third single. Motherland was revealed to be a 12-track album and when asked why is it taking so long? she commented "One needs to take one's time because good work takes time. But it must be worth the wait in the end." At the 4th City People Awards, 14 July 2013, she lost South South Musician of the Year to fellow Rivers State recording artist Oba Omega; present at the occasion were the celebrities Rita Dominic and Yvonne Nelson from Ghana. Muma Gee competed in the first Imo State intercommunity beauty pageant, representing the community of Umuhu in Ngor Okpala. She came into the competition through her matrimonial union with Eke, whose heritage stems from the Umuhu people. On 1 August 2013, she was named Mrs. Ngor Okpala by first lady of Imo State, Nneoma Nkechi Okorocha, after beating off challenges from 28 other entrants. It was also made known on 23 September 2013, that Muma Gee has commenced a new recording session—possibly for Motherland—with Slim Burna and P Jaydino in the studio. On 15 February 2014, whilst heavily pregnant with her first child, she confirmed in a telephone interview with Saturday Beats of The Punch that she will be performing at the album launch party for Motherland regardless of her physical condition. On 18 April, just weeks before the anticipated concert, Uwame delivered twins – a boy and a girl commenting on this Uwame said, "I was not initially expecting twins. All I knew was that I started getting big and bigger. And people would see me and say, oh, you are looking so beautiful. I didn't believe I was going to have twins."

== Politics ==
In October 2014, Muma Gee officially announced her intent to run for a seat in the Nigeria's House of Representatives via the Ahoada East–Abua–Odual constituency in Rivers State. She initially registered to run as a member of the Rivers State People's Democratic Party but later switched allegiance to the Labour Party, becoming the party's nominee for the seat. While elaborating on the reasons for her decision to join politics, Muma Gee described the move as the appropriate means to "liberate her people" who she says deserves representation that is qualitative and has their best interest in mind.

She was defeated at the federal election by Betty Apiafi, who ran as a PDP candidate and who has represented the constituency since 2007.

== Personal life ==
Uwame lives in Port Harcourt with her actor husband, whom she has been happily married to since 2011. They are both devout Christians and did not participate in courtship. She was later separated from her husband Prince Eke.

As of 18 April 2014, they had two children, a twin boy and girl, whom they named Chika and Chisa Eke. Her third child and second daughter, Okwuluoka, was born on the same day as her father Prince Eke on 18 August 2016.

== Discography ==
=== Studio albums ===
List of albums
Title	Album details
Kade	Released: 2006; Label: Black Attraction Productions; Formats: CD
The Woman in Question	Released: 3 May 2010; Label: Mgee Records; Formats: CD, VCD

== Filmography ==
Year	Film	Role	Notes
2006	Last Dance 1	Lucia	with Chioma Chukwuka
2006	Last Dance 2	Lucia	Drama
2006	Last Dance 3	Lucia	Directed by Obi Callys Obinali
2008	Solid Affection 1	Jane	with Oge Okoye, Uche Jombo & Ramsey Nouah
2008	Solid Affection 2	Jane	Directed by Ikechukwu Onyeka
2011	Secret Code	Jean	with Prince Eke & Mercy Johnson
2011	The Code 1	Jean	
2011	The Code 2	Jean	

== See also ==
- List of people from Port Harcourt
- List of Nigerian musicians
- List of Nigerian actresses
