= M Trill =

Nigerian rapper

M-Trill
- Also known as: Mayjah thrill
- Born: Teria Yarhere; 1978 or 1979 (age 46–47); Port Harcourt, Nigeria
- Origin: Delta State
- Genres: Hip hop, African hip hop
- Occupation: Rapper
- Years active: 2003–present
- Labels: Xcel music, Grafton Records, Indie

Teria Yarhere known by stage name M Trill (stylized as M-Trill or M.Trill), is a Nigerian rapper from Delta State. He released his debut studio album Number One in 2008 along with a follow-up mixtape entitled Ladies and Gentlemen (2010). That same year, he won the "Best West African Act" at the Channel O Music Video Awards for his single "Bounce". M Trill has been featured on songs with Timaya, Cyrus da Virus, Ruggedman, Slim Burna, 2shotz, A-Q, Kraftmatiks, Modenine, Godwon, Evaezi, and Pyrelli among others. He was ranked by BellaNaija magazine as one of the illest rappers in the game.

== Biography ==
In 2012, Trill linked up with fellow Nigerian artist Slim Burna and the pair recorded a song called "Oya Na" which was later released in May that same year. M-Trill was also honored alongside Timaya, Duncan Mighty, Timi Dakolo, Sodi Cookey, and Becky Enyioma at the 4th annual Odudu Music Awards in Nigeria, also tagged "Niger Delta's Biggest Awards Ceremony".

In 2013, M-Trill teamed up with an up-and-coming rapper known as Rraz. The duo named SSS (South-South Syndicate) began working on a collaborative project. Their first single "Fastlanes" has Trilla and Rraz rapping over 'Eminem and Royce da 5'9'′s single. It was mixed with additional production by Charlie X and Sean Stan.

== Musical influences ==
M-Trill cites Jay-Z, Nas, The Notorious B.I.G., Snoop Dogg, Tupac Shakur, and Dr. Dre as his musical influences. He also states that part of his childhood revolved around African music, naming the likes of Onyeka Onwenu, Salif Keita, Youssou N'Dour, Mieway, Koffi Olomide, and Sunny Ade as the few artists he listened to.

== Discography ==
- 2008: Number One
- 2010: Ladies and Gentlemen

== Awards and nominations ==
=== Channel O Music Video Awards ===
Year	Nominee / work	Award	Result	Ref
2008	"Bounce"	Best West African Video	Won	

=== African Music Awards ===
Year	Nominee / work	Award	Result	Ref
2009	"Number one"	Best new act	Won	

=== Odudu Music Awards ===
Year	Nominee / work	Award	Result	Ref
2012	"Honorary Award"	For contribution to the growth of the PH entertainment industry	Won	

== See also ==
- List of people from Port Harcourt
- List of Nigerians
