= Idahams =

Nigerian singer and songwriter

- Born: Hart Idawarifagha Ishmael
- Origin: Rivers State, Nigeria
- Genres: Afrobeats; Afro-pop; Urban Afro-highlife; Afro R'n'b
- Occupations: Singer; producer; songwriter
- Instruments: Vocals, Piano
- Years active: 2015–present
- Labels: Grafton Records; UMGNG
- Website: www.idahams.net

Hart Idawarifagha Ishmael (born May 19), known professionally as Idahams, is a Nigerian singer, songwriter and record producer. He secured a record deal with Grafton Entertainment in 2016 and joined the Universal Music Nigeria roaster in 2019. Idahams made his first break in 2018 through the song "God Can Bless Anybody" by Mr 2Kay which he wrote and also featured on, the song topped the ITunes Chart barely a week after release.

== Early life ==
Idahams was born and raised in the famous Bonny Island, Rivers State. He started honing his musical talent at the age of 10 and would later go on to land a deal with Grafton records in 2016. He released a number of solo records under Grafton records but made his first break in 2018 through his appearance on the song "God Can Bless Anybody" by Nigerian pop artiste, Mr 2Kay.

== Career ==
In August 2018, Idahams released "No One Else", a song which he revealed was inspired by Davido and his fiancée, Chioma’s relationship during an interview with Pulse News. In March 2018, Idahams released a remix of "No One Else" with Nigerian pop star, Teni. In the last quarter of 2019, Idahams released the Amayanabo EP which documented his journey from the creeks of Port Harcourt to becoming a music royalty.

In November 2019, Idahams released the song, "Billion Dollar" and announced his new deal with Universal Music group through a joint partnership that was established by Grafton Entertainment.

== Awards and nominations ==
Year	Award ceremony	Prize	Result
2018	Galaxy Music Awards	Best video - No one else	Won
2018		Music Producer of the year - no one else	Won
2018	BAE Awards	Lyricist on the roll	Won
2018		Music Producer of the year	Won
2019	BAE Awards	Song of the year	Won
2019	BAE Awards	Artist of the year	Won

== Discography ==
=== EPs ===
- Amayanabo (2019)
- Man On Fire (2021)
- Man On Fire (Deluxe) (2021)
- Truth, Love & Confessions (TLC)

=== Singles ===
- “Anything for you” (2016)
- "Toast" (2017)
- "Heal the Land" (2018)
- "No One Else" (2018)
- "Amayanabo" (2019)
- "Billion Dollar" (2019)
- "Shima" (2020)
- "Enter my eye" (2020)
- ”Shima (remix) featuring Peruzzi and Seyi Shay “ (2020)
- “Man on Fire (remix) featuring Falz” (2021)
- God Bless Africa (2023)
