= Duncan Mighty =

Nigerian musician (born 1983)

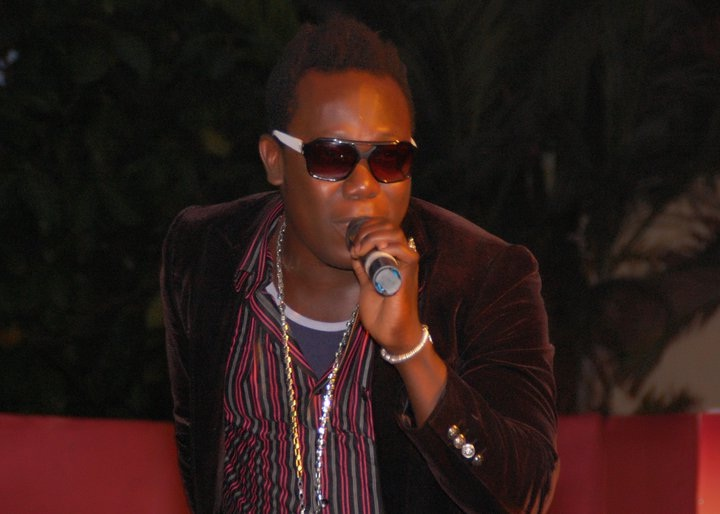
- Born: 28 October 1983 (age 42); Port Harcourt, Rivers State, Nigeria
- Occupations: Musician; singer; record producer
- Spouse: Vivien Okechukwu (m. 2015)
- Musical career
- Genres: Reggae; African R&B; world music; hip hop
- Years active: 2006–present
- Labels: AireMighty Records; Young Wealth Records

Duncan Wene Mighty Okechukwu (born 28 October 1983), simply known as Duncan Mighty, is a Nigerian musician, singer, and music producer from Obio-Akpor Local government area, Rivers State. Though his musical style demonstrates a high-level of genre versatility, it is also heavily influenced by the sounds and culture of his people and ethnicity as most of his songs are sung in his native Ikwerre language.

Wene Mighty released his debut full-length album Fully Loaded (Koliwater) in 2009, which was a commercial success. The 22-track album yielded popular songs such as "Ijeoma", "Scatter My Dada", "Ako Na Uche" and drew the attention of many music lovers across the country. His second studio album, Legacy (Ahamefuna) was released in 2010 with a lesser number of 15 tracks than its predecessor. The album was also very well received by fans and music aficionados. Tracks like "Obianuju" and "Port Harcourt Son" brought him international fame and huge fan following. He received three nominations at the 6th Annual NEA Awards in 2011 and won the "Indigenous Artist of the Year".

In September 2012, Wene Mighty released Footprints, an 18-track album with guest appearances from Timaya, Shaggy, Otuu Sax, Sandaz Black and Wande Coal. He has been honoured by the UN as a peace ambassador.

== Biography ==
=== Music career ===
"Wene is my local name, the native name they know me by at home, Wene means brotherhood. If you are a Port-Harcourt man, you will easily grasp the meaning. It means my brother from another mother. I always use that slogan in every of my songs because 'wene mighty' means togetherness."

— Duncan Mighty speaking on the meaning behind "Wene"

From his youth, Duncan Wene Mighty began as an instrumentalist; he played drums in church and was the choir director. His interest in music grew with time and eventually led him to the school, where he studied Audio engineering. During his Youth Service, he served as a sound instructor for Benson and Hedges. He also worked at Dolphin Studios while on IT at Muson Centre in Lagos. At this time, Wene Mighty was certain about his singing potential, although his main focus was strongly on music production. He would later begin recording and eventually combining both skills.

In 2006, he returned to Port Harcourt where he first rendered his services to record companies D Large Records and 360 Records, before partnering with celebrity jeweller Chris Aire to form AireMighty Records. His father Mr. Okechukwu passed on to the Afterlife in 2007. The following year, Wene Mighty released his first studio album, Koliwater, which helped establish him as a homegrown hitmaker in the music industry. The album contains twenty two songs including "Ijeoma", "Scatter My Dada", "Dance For Me" and "Ako Na Uche". After substantial success with the album, Wene Mighty began work on his next album Ahamefuna (Legacy) and by second quarter 2010, it was released into the local record stores in Nigeria. This album was produced entirely by Wene Mighty himself with no guest appearances or featured artists. It was preceded by the lead single "I Don't Give A Shot". Wene Mighty also snared a leading three nominations for the 2011 NEA Awards and won in the category of the "Indigenous Artist of the Year". Footprints was released in September 2012. The album features collaborations with Timaya, Shaggy, Otuu Sax, Sandaz Black and Wande Coal. Wene Mighty was honoured alongside fellow South South artists M-Trill, Timaya, Becky Enyioma and Sodi Cookey at the 4th annual Odudu Music Awards.

In 2014, Wene Mighty released his fourth studio album Grace & Talent through his own imprint Young Wealth Records. The album included contributions from Phyno, KING STUNNA, Tick Lips, J Flex and more.

== Personal life ==
On 25 July 2015, Duncan Mighty married his fiancée Vivien, the event was by invitation only where famous gospel artist Sammie Okposo performed as a guest artist. Nigerian celebrities such as Yemi Alade, Phyno and Patoranking attended the ceremony. Duncan Mighty had proposed to his then-fiancée in November 2014.

== Discography ==
In 2018, Duncan Mighty enjoyed a resurgence in the national scene, as he collaborated with several popular artists such as Wizkid, Davido, Tiwa Savage, and others. He released several hit songs, such as Fake Love, Lova Lova, Aza, and Flenjo.

=== Studio albums ===
- Koliwater (2009)
- Ahamefuna (Legacy) (2010)
- Footprints (2012)
- Grace & Talent (2014)
- The Certificate (2016)

== Awards and nominations ==
List of awards and nominations received by Duncan Mighty

Year	Event	Prize	Nominated work	Result	Ref
2011	The Headies	Artiste of the Year	Himself	Nominated	
2011	Nigeria Entertainment Awards	Best Album of the Year	Legacy (Ahamefuna)	Nominated	
2011	Nigeria Entertainment Awards	Hottest Single of the Year	"Obianuju"	Nominated	
2011	Nigeria Entertainment Awards	Indigenous Artist of the Year	Himself	Won	
2012	Ghana Music Awards	African Artist of the Year	Himself	Nominated	

== See also ==
- List of Igbo people
- List of Nigerian musicians
- List of people from Port Harcourt
- Music of Port Harcourt
