= Grafton Entertainment =

Nigerian record label

- Founded: 2004
- Founder: Tonye Ibiama
- Status: Active
- Genre: Hip hop, R&B, pop, world
- Country of origin: Nigeria
- Location: Port Harcourt, London
- Official website: Grafton Entertainment

Grafton Entertainment, sometimes referred to as Grafton Records, is an artist management company and record label, with dual-headquarters in both Nigeria and United Kingdom.

== History ==
Grafton Entertainment was formed in 2004 by Tonye Ibiama, who created the company with the intention to bring the vast talent pool in Port Harcourt into the national and global spotlight. The first artists to join the label's roster were De Indispensables, a hip hop duo consisting of members Lenny B and Tick Lips. They were signed to the company in 2004 following their impressive performance on the Grafton Entertainment Music Hunt. The competition, which was organized by the record label in collaboration with Rhythm 93.7 launched not only De Indispensables but demonstrated the company's professionalism and efficiency. M Trill became the second artist to be signed to Grafton Entertainment, after De Indispensables.

Grafton endorsed the release of three hugely popular singles by Lenny B and Tick Lips – "Sweet Mama", "Cinderella" (in Nigeria) and "I Love You" (in the United Kingdom via HMV stores). Throughout 2005, "Sweet Mama" topped various mainstream charts in Nigeria. In the UK, it charted at number 16 on the UK DMC Urban chart. The other single titled "I Love You" debuted at number-three on the R&B charts and at number thirty-seven on the UK Top 40. In 2007, De Indispensables won Best West African Act at the Channel O Music Video Awards after "I Love You" entered the Channel O Chart at number one and stayed at the top for three weeks. "Peace Song" which was recorded alongside M Trill also managed to clinch the number-one spot on the MTV Base Africa Chart for four weeks.

== Artists and producers ==
=== Current ===
Name	Year signed	Albums under Grafton	Description
Idahams	2016	—	Singer, songwriter and record producer.
Big Mouf	2010	—	Rapper, DJ and record producer. Big Mouf began writing and performing music in shows back in high school in 1994.
J-Boy	2011	2	Reggae gospel singer raised in Port Harcourt, Rivers State. J-Boy has maintained a solo career, with two successful albums to his credit.
Mr. 2Kay	2010	1	Real name Abiye David Jumbo. Released his debut studio album Waterside Boy in March 2012.
Prince Hezekiah	—	—	—
Tha IBZ	2009	1	Duo composed of Big Mou (Ibidabo Aprioku) and his younger brother I-B-Z (Ibiso Aprioku). Their debut studio album was released in February 2009.

=== Former ===
Name	Years on the label	Albums under Grafton	Description
Slim Burna	2008	—	Burna worked primarily as a record producer at the Grafton Studio in Port Harcourt. He later left the label to start Street Rhymes.
De Indispensables	2004–2008	1	Duo of Lenny B and Tick Lips parted ways with Grafton in 2008 and are currently signed to their own record label Ijaw Boyz Entertainment.
M Trill	2005–2010	2	M Trill left the label in 2010 after spending five years there. He completed one studio album and one mixtape for Grafton Entertainment after moving from Xcel Music.
