= List of governors of Rivers State =

Governor of Rivers State
- Seal of Rivers State of Nigeria

- Flag of Rivers State of Nigeria

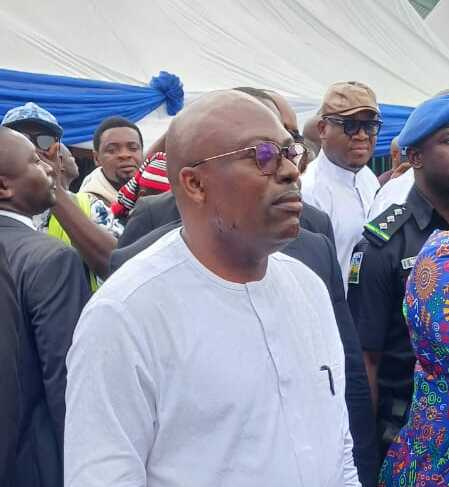
- Incumbent; Siminalayi Fubara since 18 September 2025
- Government of Rivers State
- Style: Governor (informal); His Excellency or Your Excellency (courtesy)
- Member of: Executive Council of Delta State
- Reports to: President of Nigeria
- Residence: The Brick House, Port Harcourt
- Seat: Port Harcourt
- Appointer: Popular vote
- Term length: Four years, renewable once consecutively
- Constituting instrument: Constitution of Nigeria
- Inaugural holder: Melford Okilo
- Formation: 1 October 1979
- Deputy: Deputy governor of Rivers State

Location of Rivers State in Nigeria

Rivers State, located in the Niger Delta region of Nigeria, has undergone political transformations, influenced by colonial, military, and civilian administrations. Rivers State was originally part of the Eastern Region before Nigeria's independence in 1960. During the colonial era, British officials governed the region until Nigeria's first military coup in 1966, which led to the abolition of the regional system. (Note: Nigeria's regional system of government was a decentralised political structure where the country was divided into autonomous regions—each with its own legislature, executive, and judiciary—allowing them to govern internal affairs and manage resources independently, while still operating under a central federal authority.) In 1967, military leader Yakubu Gowon created Rivers State, which remained under military rule until the brief return to civilian governance in 1979. However, another coup in 1983 reinstated military control until Nigeria's full transition to democracy in 1999.

Since 1999, Rivers State has been governed by elected officials, beginning with Peter Odili of the Peoples Democratic Party (PDP). Subsequent governors included Chibuike Amaechi, Ezenwo Wike, and Siminalayi Fubara. However, in March 2025, President Bola Tinubu declared a state of emergency due to political instability, suspending Fubara's government and appointing retired Vice admiral Ibok-Ete Ibas as the state's administrator. The decision has been met with controversy, with opposition governors challenging it at the Supreme Court. In September 2025, Tinubu ended the state of emergency and restored Fubara as governor.

== List of governors ==
=== Eastern Region ===
Before Nigeria's independence in 1960, the territory that now constitutes Rivers State was part of the Eastern Region, one of the country's original administrative divisions. During the colonial era, British officials governed the Eastern Region, with Clement Pleass (1954–1956) and Robert Stapledon (1956–1960) serving as governors. After independence, Francis Akanu Ibiam (1960–1966) became the first Nigerian governor of the Eastern Region, while Michael Okpara served as its second premier (1960–1966) succeeding Nnamdi Azikiwe. However, following Nigeria’s first military coup in January 1966, the military abolished the regional system, dismissed civilian premiers, and appointed military administrators, with Chukwuemeka Odumegwu Ojukwu governing the Eastern Region from January 1966 until its dissolution in May 1967.

=== Rivers State ===
In May 1967, following Nigeria's restructuring by Yakubu Gowon, the Eastern Region was divided into three new states: East-Central State, South-Eastern State, and Rivers State. The newly-created Rivers State was placed under military rule, with Alfred Diete-Spiff serving as its first military governor (1967–1975). The state remained under military administration until Nigeria's brief return to civilian governance in 1979, when Melford Okilo of the National Party of Nigeria (NPN) became its first elected governor. A new office was created for the 1979 elections: deputy governor of Rivers State. Deputies were elected on a joint ticket with the gubernatorial candidate, and thus share the same party by default. However, the military coup of December 1983 led to the dismissal of civilian governments, and Rivers State returned to military rule under police commissioner Fidelis Oyakhilome (1984–1986) and successive military administrators until another brief civilian transition in 1992, when Rufus Ada George of the National Republican Convention (NRC) was elected governor. The military annulled the Third Republic in 1993, and Rivers State was again placed under military administration until Nigeria's full return to democracy in 1999.

Under the Fourth Republic, Rivers State has been governed by elected civilian governors, beginning with Peter Odili (1999–2007) of the Peoples Democratic Party (PDP). Subsequent governors included Chibuike "Rotimi" Amaechi (2007–2015), Ezenwo "Nyesom" Wike (2015–2023), and Siminalayi Fubara, who took office on 29 May 2023. However, President Bola Tinubu, in March 2025, declared a state of emergency in Rivers State, citing prolonged political instability. The declaration led to the suspension of Fubara, his deputy, Ngozi Odu, and the state's House of Assembly for six months. Tinubu appointed retired vice admiral Ibok-Ete Ibas as the administrator of the state, marking the first military-led administration in Rivers State since 1999. The decision has been met with controversy, with seven opposition governors from the PDP challenging it at the Supreme Court, arguing that it violated the 1999 Constitution of Nigeria. In September 2025, Tinubu ended the state of emergency and reinstated Fubura as governor.

Heads of the government of Rivers State
Governor		Term in office	Party	Election	D. Governor	Notes
—	Alfred Diete-Spiff (b. 1942)	May 1967 – July 1975	Military governor	—	Office did not exist	
Zamani Lekwot	Zamani Lekwot (b. 1944)	July 1975 – July 1978	Military governor	—	Office did not exist	
—	Suleiman Saidu	July 1978 – October 1979	Military governor	—	Office did not exist	
—	Melford Okilo (b. 1933–d. 2008)	October 1979 – December 1983	NPN	1979; 1983	Frank Eke	
—	Fidelis Oyakhilome (b. 1939)	January 1984 – August 1986	Military governor	—	Office abolished	
—	Anthony Ukpo (b. 1947)	August 1986 – July 1988	Military governor	—	Office abolished	
—	Ernest Adelaye (b. 1943)	July 1988 – August 1990	Military governor	—	Office abolished	
Godwin Abbe	Godwin Abbe (b. 1949)	August 1990 – January 1992	Military governor	—	Office abolished	
—	Rufus Ada George (b. 1940)	January 1992 – November 1993	NRC	1991	Peter Odili	
—	Dauda Komo	December 1993 – August 1996	Military governor	—	Office abolished	
—	Musa Shehu	August 1996 – August 1998	Military governor	—	Office abolished	
—	Sam Ewang (b. 1952)	August 1998 – August 1999	Military governor	—	Office abolished	
—	Peter Odili (b. 1948)	29 May 1999 – 29 May 2007	PDP	1999; 2003	Gabriel Toby	
—	Celestine Omehia (b. 1959)	29 May 2007 – 25 October 2007	PDP	2007	Tele Ikuru	In October 2007, Nigeria's Supreme Court annulled the election of Celestine Omehia, ruling that Rotimi Amaechi was the rightful candidate of the People's Democratic Party. Omehia had replaced Amaechi last-minute due to graft allegations, but the court reinstated him without fresh elections.
Rotimi Amaechi	Rotimi Amaechi (b. 1965)	29 October 2007 – 29 May 2015	PDP	2011	Tele Ikuru	
Ezenwo Nyesom Wike	Ezenwo Nyesom Wike	29 May 2015 – 29 May 2023	PDP	2015; 2019	Ipalibo Banigo	
Siminalayi Fubara	Siminalayi Fubara (b. 1975)	29 May 2023 – 18 March 2025	PDP	2023	Ngozi Odu	Suspended by President Bola Tinubu since 18 March 2025 for six months
Ibok Ekwe Ibas	Ibok Ekwe Ibas (b. 1960)	18 March 2025 – 18 September 2025	Military administrator	—	Office dissolved	
Siminalayi Fubara	Siminalayi Fubara (b. 1975)	18 September 2025 – Incumbent	PDP	—	Ngozi Odu	

== See also ==
- List of people from Rivers State
- List of governors of Bayelsa State
