= Chief of Staff (Rivers State) =

The Chief of Staff (COS) is an appointed executive branch official in the Government of Rivers State, Nigeria, responsible for coordinating the operations of the Governor's office as well as assisting the Chief Executive in the management of affairs of the government. The Chief of Staff oversees members of the Executive Council and serves as the Governor's liaison with the state executive branch.

Other responsibilities include preparation of the Governor's daily schedule, organisation of meetings, arbitration of disputes, and regulation of gubernatorial access.

== List of Chiefs of Staff ==
#	Chief of Staff	Years	Governor
1	Fred Alasia	1999 – 2007	Peter Odili
2	Emeh Glory Emeh	2007	Celestine Omehia
3	Ezenwo Wike	2007 – 2011	Chibuike Amaechi
4	Tony Okocha	2011 – 2015	Chibuike Amaechi
5	Chukwuemeka Woke	2015 – 2023	Ezenwo Wike
6	Ehie Ogerenye Edison	2023 – present	Siminalayi Fubara
