= Eberechi Wike =

Nigerian judge

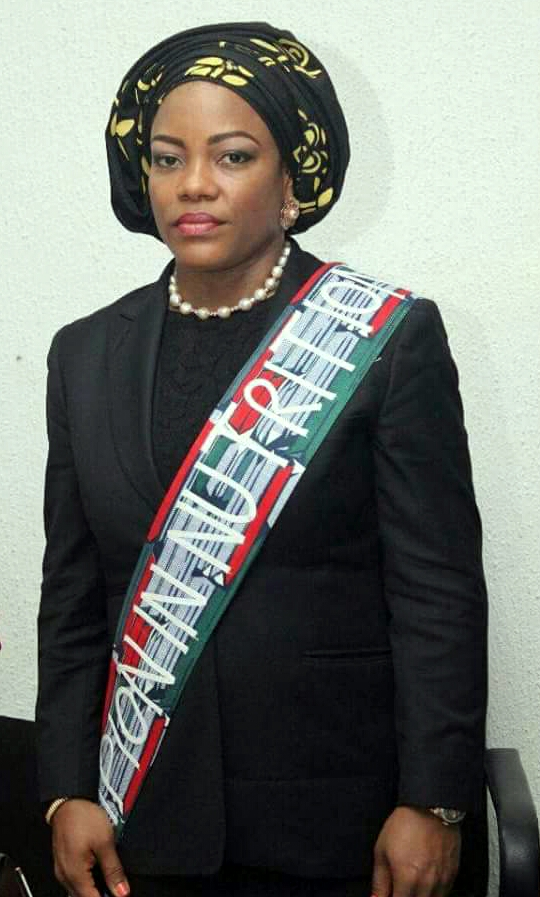
- Wike at the Zonal Nutrition Summit in Port Harcourt

Justice of the Court of Appeal of Nigeria
- Incumbent
- Assumed office 2024

First Lady of Rivers State
- In office 29 May 2015 – 29 May 2023
- Governor: Ezenwo Nyesom Wike
- Preceded by: Judith Amaechi
- Succeeded by: Valerie Fubara

Judge of the Rivers State High Court of Justice
- In office 14 February 2012 – 2024
- Appointed by: Chibuike Amaechi
- Preceded by: ??

Personal details
- Born: Eberechi Suzzette Obuzor; 24 May 1972 (age 54) Odiokwu, Ahoada West, Rivers State
- Spouse: Ezenwo Nyesom Wike
- Children: 3
- Parent: Ikechukwu Obuzor
- Education: University of Science and Technology, Rivers State
- Profession: Lawyer

Eberechi Suzzette Wike (née Obuzor; born 24 May 1972) is a Nigerian jurist and lawyer. A judge in the Rivers State High Court, she is married to former Rivers State Governor Nyesom Wike who is currently the Minister of the Federal Capital Territory.

== Early life and education ==
Wike was born Eberechi Suzzette Obuzor in Odiokwu, Ahoada West of Rivers State. She comes from a Christian family consisting of Dr. and Mrs. Obuzor. She attended Rivers State University of Science and Technology, where she received her LL.B. (Hons.) in 1996.

Following her graduation, Wike successfully enrolled in Law School. She achieved the Barrister-at-Law degree (B.L.) in 1997. A year later, she was admitted to the Nigerian bar, eventually commencing practice in Port Harcourt, Rivers State.

Wike is a recipient of the Chevening Scholarship award (UK). She also holds a master's degree in law (LL.M.) from the University of Sussex.

== Career ==
Wike joined Efe Chambers as Legal Counsel in charge of litigation. She was later selected to serve as Magistrate Grade I. While in the service, she rose to Chief Magistrate Grade II, and from there became High Court judge in February 2012.

After serving as a High Court Judge for about 12 years, she was elevated and appointed as a Justice of the Court of Appeal on the 10th of July, 2024.

She is a member of the International Bar Association, International Federation of Women Lawyers Rivers State Branch, National and International Association of Women Judges. Other memberships include Institute of Chartered Mediators and Conciliators, Chartered Institute of Arbitrators and former member of Magistrates’ Association of Nigeria Rivers State.

== See also ==
- List of people from Rivers State
- Government of Rivers State
- List of first ladies of Nigerian states

Honorary titles
| Preceded by Judith Amaechi | First Lady of Rivers State; 29 May 2015 – Present | Succeeded by Incumbent |
