= 2003 Rivers State gubernatorial election =

2003 gubernatorial election in Rivers State, Nigeria

- (Nigeria)
- April 19, 2003
| Nominee | Peter Odili | Sergeant Awuse |
| Party | PDP | ANPP |
| Running mate | Gabriel Toby |
| Popular vote | 2,098,692 |
Governor before election
Peter Odili
PDP
Elected Governor
Peter Odili
PDP

The 2003 Rivers State gubernatorial election occurred on April 19, 2003. Incumbent Governor PDP's Peter Odili won election for a second term, defeating ANPP's Sergeant Awuse and two other candidates.

Peter Odili emerged winner in the PDP gubernatorial primary election. His running mate was Gabriel Toby.

== Electoral system ==
The Governor of Rivers State is elected using the plurality voting system.

== Results ==
A total of four candidates registered with the Independent National Electoral Commission to contest in the election. PDP Governor Peter Odili won re-election for a second term, defeating ANPP's Sergeant Awuse and two other candidates.

The total number of registered voters in the state was 2,272,238. However, only 92.93% (i.e. 2,111,625) of registered voters participated in the exercise.

| Candidate | Party | Votes | % |
|---|---|---|---|
| Peter Odili | People's Democratic Party (PDP) | 2,098,692 | 100.00 |
| Sergeant Awuse | All Nigeria Peoples Party(ANPP) | | |
| Alliance for Democracy (AD) | | | |
| Charles Beki | United Nigeria People's Party (UNPP) | | |
| Total | | 2,098,692 | 100.00 |
| Registered voters/turnout | | 2,272,238 | – |
Source: Gamji, Africa Update
