= Gabriel Pidomson =

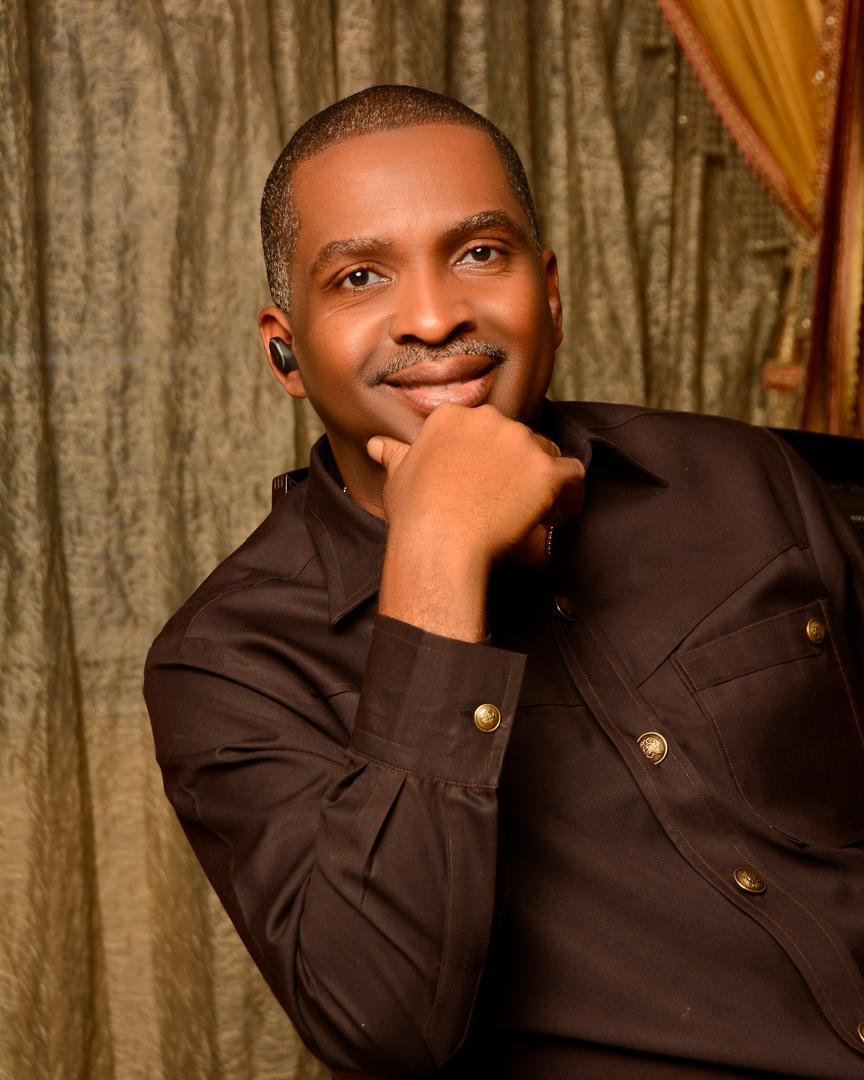

Secretary to the Government of Rivers State
- In office 8 June 2007 – 25 October 2007
- Governor: Celestine Omehia
- Constituency: Gokana

Member of the Rivers State House of Assembly
- In office 2003–2007

Personal details
- Born: Gabriel Baritulem Pidomson; 22 May 1970 (age 56) Port Harcourt, Rivers State, Nigeria
- Party: African Democratic Congress
- Occupation: Politician, entrepreneur, quantity surveyor
- Known for: Former Secretary to the Government of Rivers State

Gabriel Baritulem Pidomson (born 22 May 1970) is a Nigerian politician, entrepreneur, quantity surveyor, project manager, management systems consultant, and social advocate. He is a member of the African Democratic Congress (ADC) and the governorship candidate of the party.

Pidomson was elected to the Rivers State House of Assembly in 2003 at the age of 33, representing Gokana Constituency in Gokana Local Government Area of Rivers State. During his tenure, he served as Chairman of the House Committee on Health. In 2007, he was appointed Secretary to the Government of Rivers State by Governor Sir Celestine Omehia.

Born in Port Harcourt, Rivers State, Pidomson graduated from the Rivers State University of Science and Technology (now Rivers State University) in 1994 with a degree in Quantity Surveying, graduating as the best student in his department. During his undergraduate years, he held several student leadership positions, including President of the National Association of Quantity Surveying Students (1990), Vice President of the Environmental Sciences Students Association (1992), and Speaker/Chairman of the National Union of Rivers State Students Representatives Council (1992).

Following his National Youth Service Corps (NYSC) programme during the 1995–1996 service year, he received the Rivers State Honours Award in recognition of his distinguished service.

Pidomson holds three master's degrees from the University of Port Harcourt, the University of Liverpool, and the University of Warwick in the United Kingdom. He also earned a Ph.D. in Management Information Systems from Walden University in the United States.

In 2003, he was conferred the traditional title of Mene Leture I of Gokana Kingdom in recognition of his contributions to community development and public service. In 2007, he was also appointed a Justice of the Peace (JP) by the Rivers State Ministry of Justice.

== Early life ==
Gabriel Baritulem Pidomson was born on May 22, 1970, into the family of the late Sir Gabriel Deede Pidomson. He was born in Bodo, a coastal community in the Gokana Local Government Aread of Rivers State, within the Ogoni region. His background in Bodo and Gokana has remained an important part of his public identity and connection with the people of Rivers State

== Education ==
Pidomson began his primary education at St. Mary's Primary School, Port Harcourt, in 1976 and completed it at Army Children School, Elele, in 1981.

He attended Government Army Secondary School, Elele (1981–1982); Holy Family College, Abak (1982–1983); Federal Territory Administration Secondary School, Bwari (1983–1984); and Government Comprehensive Secondary School, Borokiri, Port Harcourt, where he completed his secondary education and obtained the West African School Certificate in 1986.

While in secondary school, he served as House Captain and was later recognised as the school's Best House Captain.

In 1988, Pidomson was admitted to the then Rivers State University of Science and Technology, Nkpolu, Port Harcourt, where he studied Quantity Surveying. He graduated in 1994 as the best graduating student in the department.

As an undergraduate, he actively participated in student union activities. He served as President of the National Association of Quantity Surveying Students (1990), Vice President of the Environmental Sciences Students Association (1992), and Speaker/Chairman of the National Union of Rivers State Students Representatives Council (1992).

He later obtained three master's degrees from the University of Port Harcourt, the University of Liverpool, and the University of Warwick, before earning a Ph.D. in Management Information Systems from Walden University.

== Publications ==
Pidomson has authored books and academic publications on governance, national development, religion, and Ogoni affairs. His published works include:

- Pearl on Mount Zion
- Honouring Mary: Vessel of Salvation

He has also presented academic papers at conferences in Nigeria and abroad.

== Career ==
Pidomson began his professional career in 1994 as Managing Editor of The Pen Newspapers, where he supervised the newspaper's editorial operations. In 1995, he joined Ubi Investments Limited as Manager and served until 1997.

He subsequently held executive positions in several organisations, including executive director (Projects), Gold Stream Investments Limited; Director of Operations, Gaton Communications Limited; managing director, Mentria Investments Limited; and managing director, Elzoria Investments Limited.

He has also served as a member of the Board of Trinitate International School since 2005 and has held leadership positions on the boards of several organisations, including serving as chairman of the Board of Trustees of the Initiative for Amity and Great Leadership (IAGL).

== Political career ==
Pidomson entered elective politics in 2003 when he was elected to the Rivers State House of Assembly to represent Gokana Constituency.

During his tenure in the Assembly, he chaired the House Committee on Health and also served on the Committees on Human Rights and Police Affairs, as well as Public Petitions and Complaints.

On 8 June 2007, Governor Sir Celestine Omehia appointed him Secretary to the Government of Rivers State. He served in that capacity until the Supreme Court judgment of 25 October 2007, which declared Rt. Hon. Rotimi Amaechi the duly elected Governor of Rivers State, replacing Omehia.

Pidomson later served as chairman of the Board of Trustees of the Initiative for Amity and Great Leadership (IAGL), the parent organisation of the former Wike Solidarity Movement (WSM).
