= Office of the Governor of Rivers State =

Office of the Governor
Office overview
- Jurisdiction: Rivers State
- Headquarters: Government House, Port Harcourt
- Office executive: Chukwuemeka Woke, Chief of Staff
- Parent department: Government of Rivers State

The Office of the Governor is the official office of the governor of Rivers State headquartered at Government House in Port Harcourt, Rivers State, Nigeria. It includes personnel whose duties are mainly involved with supporting or advising the governor and is an important executive body in the Government of Rivers State.

The chief of staff to the governor is in charge of the Office of the Governor and oversees timely execution of duties and activities of the governor and cooperation with relevant state and other organizations and institutions in order to define and implement policies.

== Roles and functions ==
The office has several roles and functions, with regards to the state politics. They are:

1. coordinate activities of ministries, departments and agencies;
2. monitor and follow up on implementation of government decisions and policies;
3. regional and bilateral relations;
4. relations with non-governmental bodies;
5. exercise of prerogative of mercy as deem fit;
6. nominate for state merit award and national honours;
7. issuance of certificate of occupancy as recommended by the Ministry of Urban Development;
8. secure investment opportunities for economic and overall progress of the state.

== Departments ==
- Information and Communications Technology Department
