= Manuela George-Izunwa =

Nigerian politician

Manuela Izunwa
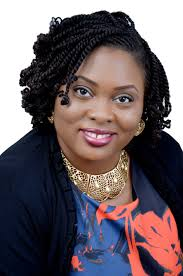

Rivers State Commissioner of Women Affairs

Personal details
- Born: 16 March 1974 (age 52) Lambeth, London, England
- Party: All Progressives Congress
- Spouse: George Izunwa

Hon. Barr. Manuela George-Izunwa is a Nigerian politician who served as Rivers State Commissioner of Women Affairs from 2007 to 2009. During her tenure, her stated campaign goals were better treatment of widows, economic female empowerment and the prevention of violence against women, as well as furthering women's health and female education. She also serve as a co-pastor with her husband Pastor George Izunwa.

== Education ==
George-Izunwa studied law at the Rivers State University of Science and Technology and became a barrister after finishing her law school at Bwari, Abuja. She also holds a master's degree in public administration from the University of Port Harcourt.

== Career ==
=== Commissioner ===
In 2007, George-Izunwa was appointed as Rivers State Commissioner of Women Affairs by Rotimi Amaechi. She was then appointed to Governor of Rivers State.

==== Support for widows ====
In June 2009, speaking to the Rivers State House of Assembly, Izunwa praised the house for enacting gender-friendly laws and asked them to pass further laws to enable widows to return to normal life after the deaths of their husbands. She lobbied for the passing of a law on widowhood rights. In April 2010, she noted that over 7,000 women have benefited from the state-run microcredit scheme for widows.

==== Economic training and assistance ====
In November 2009, Izunwa announced that the Women Affairs ministry was launching a mass literacy program for adult women, particularly in rural areas, which would also train women in skills related to food production, processing, and marketing. That month, she applauded an initiative by Shell Nigeria to launch a microcredit program in which members of the Ijaw Mothers Union would get loans to run businesses. In March 2010, Izumwa accompanied Dame Judith Amaechi, wife of Rivers State governor Rotimi Amaechi, to Israel to inspect farms and discuss training and development of agriculture among women in Rivers State.

==== Girl's Education ====
In May 2010, her Growing into Real Life (G.I.R.L) outreach program in partnership with the Women Affairs ministry began. The G.I.R.L project was to bring the PEARL Club to all schools in Nigeria. In July 2010, Izunwa said her ministry was partnering with Judith Amaechi's Empowerment Support Initiative to provide training in technical skills for youth in the state in the expectation that the program would help improve the economy and reduce poverty.

==== Violence Against Women ====
In December 2009, Izunwa urged Rivers State Police Commissioner, Mr Suleman Abba, to initiate a zero tolerance policy for violence against women and to stop the practice of granting bail to rape suspects. That month she organized a seminar to discuss the problem, as part of the International Day for the Elimination of Violence against Women that was attended by many influential women in the state. In 2010, Izunwa's Ministry organized a 16-day activism program to end violence against women and organized awareness campaigns in market places and local government areas in collaboration with Doctors Without Borders. The ministry holds weekly counseling sessions for victims of abuse.

==== Women's Health ====
In March 2010, Izunwa expressed worry over the increasing rate of maternal mortality, which she ascribed to ignorance, poverty and diseases, and called on health care practitioners to assist in ensuring that women knew where and when to get help. In April 2010, she used a television spot to inform women that there was a mammogram centre at Churchill Health centre, Port Harcourt, and advised women to conduct self breast examination as well as to go for breast cancer screening.

=== Other Leadership Positions ===
George-Izunwa is a member of the NBA, FIDA, ICMC, and a fellow of the Mentoring and Career Development Institute of Nigeria (MCDI).

In Port Harcourt, she runs the prestigious SITRID International School and a faith based organisation, Deborah's Cradle, for women leaders and aspiring leaders.

George-Izunwa founded the NGO Girls' Organisation for Leadership and Development (GOLD) in 2014.

She currently serves as a board member of the National Agency for the Control of AIDS (NACA).

== Writing ==
George-Izunwa has written several books, including Stretch (Vol 1 & 2), Overcoming Self-doubt and Don't Die in Your Nest.

== Personal life ==
Manuela George-Izunwa is the convener of Stretch Summit for women in ministry. Together with her husband, Pastor George Izunwa, she is a pastor at Gateway International Church.

She has three children: Michelle, Mirabel and Mickel.
