= Mary Odili =

Nigerian judge

The Honorable Mary Odili CFR

Associate Justice of the Supreme Court of Nigeria
- In office 23 June 2011 – 12 May 2022
- Nominated by: Goodluck Jonathan
- Preceded by: Niki Tobi

First Lady of Rivers State
- In office 29 May 1999 – 29 May 2007
- Governor: Peter Odili
- Preceded by: Rose A. George
- Succeeded by: Judith Amaechi

Personal details
- Born: 12 May 1952 (age 74) Amudi Obizi, Ezinihitte Mbaise, Imo State, Nigeria
- Spouse: Peter Odili (m. 1978)
- Children: 4
- Education: University of Nigeria; Nigerian Law School

Mary Ukaego Odili (née Nzenwa; CFR born 12 May 1952) is a retired Justice of the Supreme Court of Nigeria. She was appointed an Associate Justice of the Supreme Court of Nigeria by President Goodluck Ebele Jonathan and was administered the oath of office by Chief Justice Katsina-Alu on 23 June 2011.

Before becoming a Supreme court judge, she held numerous important offices, including Judge at the High Court of Rivers State (1992–2004), Justice at the Court of Appeal, Abuja Division (2004–2010), and Presiding Justice at the Court of Appeal, Kaduna Division (2010–2011).

== Early life and education ==
Mary Ukaego Nzenwa was born on 12 May 1952 in Amudi Obizi, Ezinihitte Mbaise Local Government Area of Imo State in southeast Nigeria. She is the second daughter of Eze Bernard Nzenwa and Ugoeze Benadette Nzenwa. Her father worked as a lawyer in the United Kingdom during 1959 before he was made Secretary of the Nigeria Airways. Ukaego attended a number of primary schools as a child including St Benedict's Primary School, Obizi Ezinitte, St Michael's Primary School, Umuahia, St Agnes Primary School, Maryland, and Our Lady of Apostles Primary School, Yaba. She briefly attended Our Lady of Apostles Secondary School, also in Yaba, Lagos.

Following the outbreak of the civil war in 1967, Ukaego and her parents relocated to the southeast of the country. There, she continued her education at Owerri Girls High School until her family moved back to Mbaise. She then attended Mbaise Girls Secondary School and later enrolled at the Queen of the Rosary College in Onitsha. In 1972, she passed with Grade I (aggregate 6) in the West African School Certificate Examination. The same year, Ukaego gained admission into the University of Nigeria, Enugu campus where she read law. In her second year at the university, she earned a scholarship for maintaining the second class upper division league with higher scores. She met Peter Odili, a medical doctor, at a campus party and the two began a romantic relationship. In 1976, she graduated with an LLB (Hons) and was rated the best student of the department of commercial and property law. Shortly after, she attended the Nigerian Law School and received her B.L. certificate in 1977, before embarking on her youth service in Benin City and Abeokuta. Odili was serving as a house officer in Benin City at the time.

== Legal career and First Lady of Rivers State ==
Ukaego commenced her career in the judiciary as a Magistrate grade III in November 1978. She married Odili in 1979 and gave birth to a daughter, Adaeze. Ukaego and her family moved to Port Harcourt city where her husband founded his medical centre Pamo Clinics. Odili and Chibuike Amaechi subsequently met there for the first time. Between 1980 and 1988, Ukaego served as Chief Magistrate Grade I, Chairman of the Juvenile Court, President, Marine Board of Inquiry into the 1979 Buguma Boat disaster, chairman, Constitution Drafting Committee of the University of Nigeria Alumni Associates, Inaugural Chairperson of the International Federal of Women Lawyers (FIDA) Rivers State and Secretary, Nigerian Horticultural Society. With her support, Odili entered politics and served as member and leader of Rivers State Delegates to the Constituent Assembly. In 1992, while she was a High Court Judge, Odili was serving as the Deputy Governor of Rivers State. In 1999, following her husband's election as Governor, Ukaego became the First Lady of Rivers State, serving until 29 May 2007.

== Supreme Court ==
She had held the offices of Justice, Court of Appeal, Abuja Division and Presiding Justice, Court of Appeal, Kaduna Division. On 3 May 2011, President Jonathan nominated Ukaego with two other Appeal Court Justices to the Supreme Court. In the new arrangement, she will represent the Southeast geo-political zone in the apex court bench. In a letter to the Senate, Jonathan said their appointment was necessitated by the retirement from service of Justices Niki Tobi, I.F. Ogbuagu, J.O. Ogebe and G. A. Oguntade. Ukaego was appointed an Associate justice of the Supreme Court of Nigeria (JSC) on 23 June 2011.

She was the leader of the Five Person Panel at the Supreme Court that nullified the Gubernatorial Election of David Lyon after his deputy was found wanting for submitting fake certificates during pre-election screening after they were declared winners on 16 November 2019, Bayelsa State gubernatorial elections.

== Retirement ==
On 12 May 2022, Mary Odili was retired from the Supreme Court, on attaining the age of 70.

Honorary titles
Preceded by Rose A. George	First Lady of Rivers State; 29 May 1999 – 29 May 2007	Succeeded by Judith Amaechi
