= 1999 Rivers State gubernatorial election =

1999 gubernatorial election in Rivers State, Nigeria

- January 9, 1999
Nominee	Peter Odili
Party	PDP	All People's Party (Nigeria)
Popular vote	770,074	710,280
Governor before election
Rufus Ada George
NRC
Elected Governor
Peter Odili
PDP

The 1999 Rivers State gubernatorial election was held in Nigeria on January 9, 1999. The PDP nominee Peter Odili won the election, defeating the APP candidate.

== Electoral system ==
The governor of Rivers State is elected using the plurality voting system.

== Primary election ==
=== PDP primary ===
The PDP primary election was won by Peter Odili.

== Results ==
The total number of registered voters in the state was 2,207,000. The total number of votes cast was 747,296, the number of valid votes was 1,580,807, and the number of rejected votes was 7,521.

Candidate	Party	Votes	%
Peter Odili	People's Democratic Party	770,074	52.02
All People's Party	710,280	47.98	
Total		1,480,354	100.00
Valid votes		1,480,354	99.49
Invalid/blank votes		7,521	0.51
Total votes		1,487,875	100.00
Registered voters/turnout		2,207,000	67.42
Source: Nigeria World, IFES, Semantics Scholar
