= 2011 Rivers State gubernatorial election =

Election

- 26 April 2011
Nominee	Rotimi Amaechi	Celestine Omehia
Party	PDP	APGA
Popular vote	1,178,529	112,528
Governor before election
Celestine Omehia
PDP
Elected Governor
Rotimi Amaechi
PDP

The 2011 Rivers State gubernatorial election was the 7th gubernatorial election of Rivers State. Held on 26 April 2011, the People's Democratic Party nominee Rotimi Amaechi won the election, defeating Celestine Omehia of the All Progressives Grand Alliance.

== Results ==
A total of 29 candidates contested in the election. Rotimi Amaechi from the People's Democratic Party won the election, defeating Celestine Omehia from the All Progressives Grand Alliance. Registered voters was 2,442,488, valid votes was 1,373,469, votes cast was 1,401,464, 27,995 votes was cancelled.

2011 Rivers State gubernatorial election
Party	Candidate	Votes	%	±%
PDP	Rotimi Amaechi	1,178,529		
APGA	Celestine Omehia	112,528		
PDP hold				
