= 2007 Rivers State gubernatorial election =

State election in Nigeria

- 14 April 2007
Nominee	Celestine Omehia	Ashley Emenike
Party	PDP	LP
Popular vote	1,853,127	101,347
Governor before election
Peter Odili
PDP
Elected Governor
Celestine Omehia
PDP

The 2007 Rivers State gubernatorial election was the 6th gubernatorial election of Rivers State. Held on 14 April 2007, the People's Democratic Party nominee Celestine Omehia won the election, defeating Ashley Emenike of the Labour Party.

== Results ==
Celestine Omehia from the People's Democratic Party won the election, defeating Ashley Emenike from the Labour Party. Registered voters was 2,583,317.

2007 Rivers State gubernatorial election
Party	Candidate	Votes	%	±%
PDP	Celestine Omehia	1,853,127		
LP	Ashley Emenike	101,347		
PDP hold				
