= Rivers State Judicial Service Commission =

Government agency in Nigeria

The Rivers State Judicial Service Commission established under section 197 (1) (c) of the 1999 Constitution is the executive body that handles matters relating to appointment, discipline and promotion of Rivers State's judicial officers and their support staffs. It is chaired by the Chief Judge of the High Court of Rivers State.

== Composition ==
All members are appointed by the governor of Rivers State, with confirmation by the Rivers State House of Assembly. The Judicial Service Commission is made up of:

1. The Chief Judge, as the Chairman;
2. The Attorney General
3. The President of the Customary Court of Appeal
4. Two legal practitioners
5. Two more persons, who in the Governor's opinion are of unquestionable integrity.

== Powers and responsibilities ==
Part II, third schedule of the 1999 Constitution empowers the Judicial Service Commission to advise and make recommendations to the National Judicial Council (NJC) on appointment, discipline and removal of judicial officers and their assisting staffs.

== See also ==
- List of government agencies of Rivers State
- Judiciary of Rivers State
