= 1983 Rivers State gubernatorial election =

1983 gubernatorial election in Rivers State, Nigeria

- August 13, 1983
Nominee	Melford Okilo
Party	NPN
Elected Governor
Melford Okilo
NPN

The 1983 Rivers State gubernatorial election occurred on August 13, 1983. NPN candidate Melford Okilo won the election.

== Results ==
Melford Okilo representing NPN won the election. The election held on August 13, 1983.
