= 1979 Rivers State gubernatorial election =

1979 gubernatorial election in Rivers State, Nigeria

- July 28, 1979
Nominee	Melford Okilo
Party	NPN
Elected Governor
Melford Okilo
NPN

The 1979 Rivers State gubernatorial election occurred on July 28, 1979. NPN candidate Melford Okilo won the election.

== Results ==
Melford Okilo representing NPN won the election. The election held on July 28, 1979.
