= Adaeze Oreh =

Nigerian medical doctor

Dr. Mrs. Adaeze Oreh
- Born: Adaeze Chidinma Odili; 19 July 1979 (age 47)
- Education: University of Nigeria, Nsukka; Imperial College Business School; London School of Hygiene & Tropical Medicine
- Occupation: Medical Doctor,Public health specialist,Researcher,Family Physician consultant
- Years active: 2003–present
- Relatives: Peter Odili (father); Mary Odili (mother)
- Medical career
- Profession: Rivers State Ministry of Health, Senior Health Officer, Federal Ministry of Health
- Field: Family medicine; Public health
- Institutions: Braithwaite Memorial Specialist Hospital, Pamo University of medical sciences

Adaeze Chidinma Oreh (born 19 July 1979) is a Nigerian family physician consultant, public health specialist, Universal health care advocate and academic who is currently a professor of medicine at Pamo University of Medical Sciences (PUMS) in Port Harcourt, where she works in the Faculty of Clinical Sciences. She has also served as a visiting consultant and lecturer in the Department of Family Medicine at Rivers State University. Oreh served as the 27th Commissioner of Health for River State between 2003 to 2025. She is a 2019 Aspen Institute New Voices Fellow.

== Early life and education ==
Adaeze Oreh was born in Benin City, Edo State to a medical doctor's father (Peter Odili) and a judicial officer's mother (Mary Odili). She is the eldest of four children. She received her primary education at The Play Pen Child Development Centre in Port Harcourt and her secondary education at the University Demonstration Secondary School, University of Port Harcourt. She proceeded to the college of medicine, University of Nigeria, Nsukka, and graduated with a Bachelor of Medicine, Bachelor of Surgery degree in 2003. After completing her medical degree, she commenced her internship at the Braithwaite Memorial Specialist Hospital of the Rivers State University in Port Harcourt. She proceeded to get a degree in International Health Management at the Imperial College Business School of the Imperial College London after the completion of her National Youth Service with the National Youth Service Corps. There, she majored in Global Health Systems, Healthcare Strategy, Healthcare Financing, Organizational Management, Health Informatics and Innovation. Dr Oreh also holds a master's degree in Public health from the London School of Hygiene & Tropical Medicine.

== Career ==
After the completion of her master's degree, she volunteered with the Federal Ministry of Health for about seven months, and then she was appointed Programme Coordinator of the Abuja Centre of the National Blood Transfusion Service – a partnership project of the United States Centers for Disease Control and Prevention (CDC) and Nigeria's Federal Ministry of Health funded under the United States President's Emergency Plan for AIDS Relief (PEPFAR). She held this position for five years between 2009 and 2014. In addition, she contributed towards the revision of the country's National Blood Policy in the National Health Act of 2014. She is a Fellow of the West African College of Physicians and a member of the National Postgraduate Medical College of Nigeria in Family Medicine and is certified in Leadership and Management in addition to Safety and Quality in Healthcare from Harvard T.H. Chan School of Public Health, University of Washington and University of Bath. She is a 2019 Aspen Institute New Voices Fellow. According to Nigerian Tribune, “she contributes to healthcare transformation through academic leadership, research, policy development, health systems strengthening and international collaboration”.

== Personal life ==
She is the daughter of the former governor of Rivers State, Dr Peter Odili, and Nigerian Supreme Court Justice, Justice Mary Odili.

She married Patrick Oreh, an electronics engineer and entrepreneur, in 2004. The couple have two children.

== Awards and recognition ==
- Recipient of Presidency of Nigeria’s Excellence in the Improvement of Population Health Outcomes Award.
- 50 Nigerian Power Women 2024 by This Day Newspaper
- The U.S. CDC Nigeria Public Health Excellence Award.
- The Kofi Annan Global Health Leadership Fellowship 2023/2024 (3rd) Cohort
- 100 Most Inspiring Women in Nigeria in 2021 by Leading Ladies Africa
- The Aspen Institute Global Health Senior Fellowship 2019.
- Fellow of Amujae Leadership Programme of the Ellen Johnson Sirleaf Presidential Center for Women and Development 2006-2018.
