= Wikeism =

Policies advocated by Ezenwo Nyesom Wike

Wikeism is the political and socio-economic policies advocated by the current Governor of Rivers State, Ezenwo Nyesom Wike. It has also been used to refer to political vigilance (Anyaneli) and the willingness to bridge the gap, listen to and empathize with the people.

Analysing the concept, John Bassey, a proponent of the People's Democratic Party, described Wikeism as an "ideology of salvaging the oppressed and downtrodden of the society". He added that its effective application contributed significantly to Wike's rise to power.

More recently, the ideology has grown to be regarded as a major political movement in Rivers State. Strong supporters of the Wike administration and Wikeism are known as Wikeists.
