= Rose A. George =

First Lady of Rivers State
- In office January 1992 – November 1993
- Succeeded by: Mary Odili

Personal details
- Born: Rose Asikiyeoforiye; 17 April 1946 Okrika, Rivers State, Nigeria
- Died: 27 October 2010 (aged 64) California, US
- Resting place: Forest Lawn Memorial Park, Glendale, California
- Spouse: Rufus Ada George

Rose Asikiyeoforiye George (17 April 1946 – 27 October 2010), was the First Lady of Rivers State from 1992 to 1993. She was the wife of Governor Rufus Ada George. At the age of 64, she was reported to have died of a protracted illness in Los Angeles, California. According to Tributes.com, she resided in Inglewood, California until her death and was interred in Forest Lawn Memorial Park Cemetery in Glendale.

== See also ==
- List of people from Rivers State
