= Judith Amaechi =

Nigerian advocate for the rights of women and children

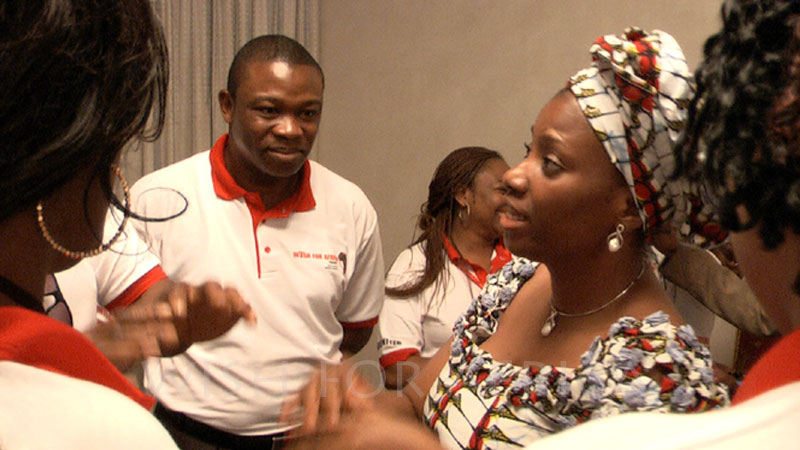
- Judith Amaechi chatting with volunteers at Government House in Port Harcourt (April 2009)

First Lady of Rivers State
- In office 26 October 2007 – 29 May 2015
- Governor: Chibuike Amaechi
- Preceded by: Mary Odili
- Succeeded by: Eberechi Wike

Personal details
- Born: Judith Obiajulu Nwankwo; 24 December 1970 (age 55) Enugu Ukwu, Anambra State, Nigeria
- Party: All Progressives Congress
- Spouse: Chibuike Amaechi (m. 1993)
- Children: 3
- Education: Rivers State University of Science and Technology

Dame Judith Obiajulu Amaechi // (née Nwankwo; born 24 December 1970) is the wife of former Rivers State Governor Chibuike Amaechi. She is head of the Empowerment Support Initiative (ESI) which campaigns against HIV/AIDS, advocates the rights of the women and children, and promotes gender equity and Girl Child education.

Amaechi was born on 24 December 1970 in Enugu Ukwu, Anambra State. She attended Federal Government Girls' College, Abuloma for her secondary education. She then attended Rivers State University of Science and Technology, where she graduated as an Urban and Regional Planning Professional. She married Chibuike Amaechi and they have three children.

Amaechi launched the Empowerment Support Initiative, a Non-Governmental Organization (NGO), on 16 October 2008. The NGO provides practical support and advice for women and children, particularly the most disadvantaged. In June 2009, speaking during International Widows Day, Amaechi called for review of native laws and customary practices that cause distress to widows, sometimes throwing them into abject poverty. In March 2010 she visited Israel with the State Commissioner for Women Affairs, Manuela George-Izunwa, to inspect farms and discuss training and development of agriculture among women in Rivers State.

In 2009 Amaechi sponsored a free mass de-worming program Rivers State children. She was a strong supporter of the Child Rights Act passed in Rivers state in 2010, aiming to prevent abuse of children. In August 2010 she opened a four-week Information and Communication Technology Farm, which provides free computer training in the holidays to junior and senior secondary school students.

According to Federal Capital Territory Minister Nyesom Wike, he accused her of receiving illicit funds monthly from the Niger Delta Development Commission and who called for the Federal Government to release the forensic audit of that commission that she received N48bn from NDDC in one year.

Honorary titles
Preceded by Mary Odili	First Lady of Rivers State; 26 October 2007 – 29 May 2015	Succeeded by Eberechi Wike
