= 1991 Rivers State gubernatorial election =

1991 gubernatorial election in Rivers State, Nigeria

Rivers gubernatorial election
- December 14, 1991
Nominee	Rufus Ada George
Party	NRC
Elected Governor
Rufus Ada George
NRC

The 1991 Rivers State gubernatorial election occurred on December 14, 1991. NRC candidate Rufus Ada George won the election.

== Conduct ==
The gubernatorial election was conducted using an open ballot system. Primaries for the two parties to select their flag bearers were conducted on October 19, 1991.

The election occurred on December 14, 1991. NRC candidate Rufus Ada George won the election.
