= Olawunmi =

Nigerian given name

- Language: Yoruba

Origin
- Origin: Nigeria
- Region of origin: South western Nigeria

Olawunmi (written as Ọláwùnmí) Olawunmi.ogg meaning (Wealth attracts me" or "I'm desirous of success,) is both a given name and a surname.

Notable people with the name include:

- Olawunmi Banjo (born 1985), Nigerian artist
- Bamike Olawunmi, Nigerian reality TV star and actress
- Ernest Olawunmi Adelaye (born 1942), Governor of Rivers State, Nigeria from July 1988 to August 1990
