= Fidelis Oyakhilome =

Nigerian politician

(Nigeria) Military Governor of Rivers State
- In office January 1984 – 26 August 1986
- Preceded by: Melford Obiene Okilo
- Succeeded by: Anthony Ukpo

Personal details
- Born: 13 April 1939 (age 86) Ishan, Edo State, Colony of Nigeria

Fidelis Oyakhilome (born 13 April 1939) was a Nigerian military governor of Rivers State from January 1984 until August 1986 during the administrations of Generals Muhammadu Buhari and Ibrahim Babangida.

== Birth and education ==
Oyakhilome was born on 13 April 1939 in Ewu, Ishan in Edo State. He joined the Nigerian Police Force in 1959. He studied law at the University of Ife (now Obafemi Awolowo University), Ile-Ife (1965–1968) and then at the Nigerian Law School, Lagos (1968–1969), being called to the Nigerian Bar on graduation.

== Police career ==
Oyakhilome became Chief Superintendent of Police, Criminal Investigation Division of the Rivers State Police, Port Harcourt (1972–1974). He served in Grenada (1975–1977). He became military governor of Rivers State in January 1984 after the military overthrow of the Nigerian Second Republic. On 19 April 1984, Oyakhilome signed the edict establishing the Rivers State School of Basic Studies, later to become the Rivers State College of Arts and Science in Port Harcourt. As governor he successfully increased agricultural output in the state. His "School to Land" program made headline news, but was later abandoned as enthusiasm waned. He was redeployed on 26 August 1986, replaced by Colonel Anthony Ukpo.

Oyakhilome was chairman of the National Drug Law Enforcement Agency (NDLEA) (1988–1991). He was dismissed after being accused of having a relationship with Jennifer Madike, a Lagos businesswoman and socialite who had been arrested for drugs-related offences. Before her arrest, she had a successful career with her company, Biofrika Ventures, and through real estate, and was a constant subject of the gossip columns. She was arrested on a charge of collecting US$80,000 from three men, claiming she was going to give the money to Oyakhilome to secure the release of two suspected drug dealers. The United States later unsuccessfully applied for extradition of one of the dealers on charges of heroin smuggling.

== Later career ==
After leaving the NDLEA, Oyakhilome became head of his own private law firm. He represented retired police officers at the National Political Reform Conference in 2005. In 2009, he was vice-chairman of the Association of Retired Police Officers of Nigeria (ARPON). He was an investor in EBS Nigeria, a previously unknown firm that in June 2006 gained a major contract for supply of anti-retroviral drugs from the Federal Ministry of Health. Other directors included retired military officers Brigadier General Abu Ahmadu and Major General David Jemibewon.

In 2008, as a consultant to the National Universities Commission (NUC) he gave a list of 33 "universities" that were operating illegally in Nigeria since they had not been licensed by the Federal Government and NUC.
