= Frank Eke =

Nigerian medical doctor and politician

1st Deputy Governor of Rivers State
- In office October 1979 – December 1983
- Governor: Melford Okilo
- Preceded by: None
- Succeeded by: Peter Odili

Personal details
- Born: 27 July 1931 Obio-Akpor, Rivers State
- Died: 4 January 2013 (aged 81)
- Party: National Party of Nigeria
- Spouse: Evang. Beatrice Chiebonam Eke
- Children: Leslie Nyebuchi Eke; Graham Ezebunwo Eke; Ada Eke; Ngozi Oyewole; Onyinye Unachukwu; Frank (Junior) Eke
- Profession: Medical doctor, politician

Frank Adiele Eke (27 June 1931 – 4 January 2013), was a Nigerian medical doctor and politician. He was the first Deputy Governor of Rivers State, serving from 1979 to 1983 under Governor Melford Okilo

== Education ==
he was first Ikwerre man to study at the Harvard University USA, where he earned a Master of Public Health in 1972. He was from Woji.

== Death ==
He died on 4 January 2013 after a short illness. Prior to his death, he was the paramount ruler of Evo Kingdom in Obio-Akpor local government area. His full title was HRM. King Dr (Amb) Sir Frank Adiele Eke (Eze Gbakagbaka of Evo land).

== Family ==
He was married to Evang. Beatrice Chiebonam Eke and had 6 children with her as follows: Leslie Eke, Graham Eke, Ada Eke, Ngozi Oyewole, Onyinye Unachukwu and Frank Eke.

== See also ==
- List of people from Rivers State
