= Adama Lamikanra =

Nigerian judge

Acting Chief Judge of Rivers State
- Incumbent
- Assumed office 15 January 2016
- Preceded by: Daisy W. Okocha

Personal details
- Born: Rivers State, Nigeria
- Profession: Lawyer

Adama Iye Iyayi Lamikanra is the current Chief Judge of Rivers State. She was sworn into office as acting Chief Judge on 15 January 2016 to replace Daisy W. Okocha who retired on the same day. She was then sworn in as Chief Judge on 8 March 2016.
