= Musa Shehu =

Musa Sheikh Shehu

Administrator of Rivers State
- In office 22 August 1996 – August 1998
- Preceded by: Dauda Musa Komo
- Succeeded by: Sam Ewang

Administrator of Plateau State
- In office August 1998 – May 1999
- Preceded by: Habibu Idris Shuaibu
- Succeeded by: Joshua Dariye

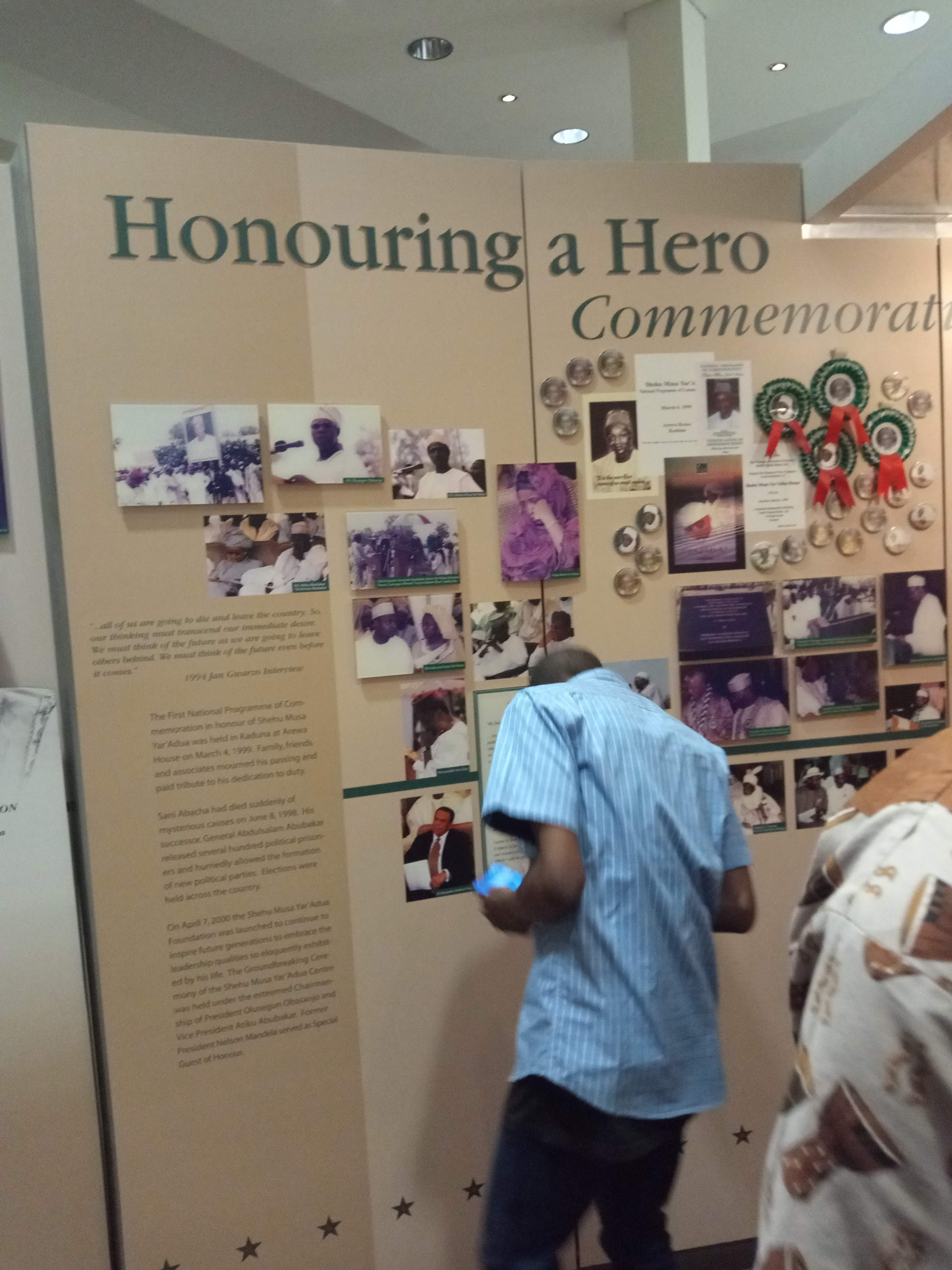
A memorial display at the Shehu Musa Yar'adua Center in Abuja, Nigeria, showing honors received by the late General

Colonel Musa Sheikh Shehu was Administrator of Rivers State, Nigeria from August 1996 to August 1998 during the military regime of General Sani Abacha, and then of Plateau State until the return to democracy in May 1999.

At the time of the coup of 27 August 1985, when General Ibrahim Babangida came to power, Captain Musa Shehu played a supporting role as second in command of the Recce Battalion in Jos.

While governor of Plateau state in 1999, Shehu received N200 million to clean up pollution from tin mining. The money was allegedly misappropriated.

Shehu remained politically active after retirement in 1999. In 2001, he was among former military administrators who formed the United Nigeria Development Forum, a political pressure group. In December 2009 he was among Northern leaders who opposed the transfer of power to vice-president Goodluck Jonathan during the illness of president Umaru Yar'Adua. In 2010 Shehu was Secretary General of the Arewa Consultative Forum, an influential group of Northern Nigerian leaders.
