= Martha Agbani =

Nigerian environmental activist

- Born: Khana, Nigeria
- Education: Kenule Beeson Saro-Wiwa Polytechnic
- Years active: 2003–
- Organization: Lokiaka Community Development Center
- Known for: Environmental activism
- Notable work: The founding director of the Lokiaka Community Development Center

Martha Agbani is a Nigerian environmental activist. She is the founding director of the Lokiaka Community Development Center, which advocates for the rights of indigenous Ogoni women farmers.

== Early life and education ==
Agbani was born in Khana, Nigeria. Her mother was an activist who protested against the multinational oil company Shell in the 1990s. As a teenager, she was a student in Bori City, and eventually attended Kenule Beeson Saro-Wiwa Polytechnic.

== Career ==
After the execution of Ken Saro-Wiwa in 1995 and her mother's death in 2001, Agbani joined the Movement for the Survival of the Ogoni People in 2003.

Following two oil spills in 2008 that damaged mangrove forests and fishing areas in Bodo, Nigeria, Shell had agreed to compensate the town approximately $83.5 million USD and replant mangroves. Agbani began to grow mangroves to sell to Shell and, in 2009, established the Lokiaka Community Development Center, a non-governmental organization that aims to support Ogoni women farmers to maintain the natural environment. According to Nigerian online newspaper TheCable, the organization sells mangroves to oil companies at a rate of approximately ₦500 – ₦1,000 (US$0.33 – US$0.66) per seedling.
