= Kenule Beeson Saro-Wiwa Polytechnic =

Polytechnic in Bori City, Rivers State, Nigeria

Kenule Beeson Saro-Wiwa Polytechnic (Kenpoly)
- Former name: Rivers State Polytechnic
- Motto: knowledge and skill development
- Type: Public
- Established: 1988
- Rector: Engr. Dr. Ledum Suanu Gwarah
- Location: Bori City, Khana, Rivers, Nigeria; 4°40′09″N 7°22′14″E
- Website: https://www.kenpoly.edu.ng/, https://ecampus.kenpoly.edu.ng/

Kenule Beeson Saro-Wiwa Polytechnic (formerly Rivers State Polytechnic) is a tertiary learning institution in Bori City, Khana Local Government Area in Rivers State, Nigeria. It has two campuses, one for the School of Management Sciences and the other for the School of Engineering. It is approved as a state-owned polytechnic by the National Board for Technical Education. Engr. Dr. Ledum Suanu Gwarah is the current Rector of the polytechnic.

== History ==
The polytechnic was established by the Rivers State Government on 13 May 1988. to provide instruction and research in applied science, technology, commerce and business management. The Military Governor, Anthony Ukpo, inaugurated the provisional council and his successor, Group Captain Ernest Adeleye signed the edict establishing the Polytechnic on 28 day of March 1989, it's located at bori the traditional headquarters of the ogoni people . And performed the formal ceremony of the institution on 19 May 1990.

In 2009, Senator Lee Ledogo Maeba noted that in 2007 he had obtained approval in principle from the Federal Government to upgrade the polytechnic to a Federal institution, but that the state government had yet to follow up on the opportunity.

In August 2009, the acting provost spoke of the problem with cultism among students, and possibly instructors, and described the decisive actions that the polytechnic was taking to combat it. Talking in November 2009 about efforts to clean up the environment from contamination by oil exploration, Rivers State Governor Rotimi Amaechi said that educational institutes including the polytechnic would assist in ensuring the success of the program.

== Notable alumni ==
- Martha Agbani

== Academic programmes ==
The Institution has 4 Schools (faculties) and they offer Academic courses for National Diploma (ND) and Higher National Diploma Degree (HND)

=== Schools and department ===
1. School of Applied Sciences

- Computer Science
- Science Laboratory Technology – ND
- Statistics
- Science Laboratory Technology (SLT)

Science Laboratory Technology HND options

- Biology
- Microbiology
- Chemistry
- Biochemistry
- Physics/Electronics

2. School of Engineering

- Civil Engineering
- Architectural engineering
- Electrical/Electronic Engineering – ND
- Electrical/Electronic Engineering

Electrical/Electronic Engineering HND Options

- Telecommunication and Electronics
- Power and Machine
- Mechanical Engineering – ND

Mechanical Engineering – HND options

- Manufacturing
- Power plant

3. School of Environmental Technology

- Estate Management
- Urban and Regional Planning
- Industrial Safety and Environmental engineering Technology

4. School of Management Sciences

- Accountancy
- Banking and Finance
- Business Administration & Management
- Marketing
- Office Technology and Management (OTM)
- Insurance
- Mass Communication
- Public Administration

== See also ==
- List of polytechnics in Nigeria
- Education in Nigeria
