= Dauda Musa Komo =

Nigerian military administrator (1959–2025)

Administrator of Rivers State
- In office 9 December 1993 – 22 August 1996
- Preceded by: Rufus Ada-George
- Succeeded by: Musa Shehu

Personal details
- Born: 1959
- Died: 30 May 2025 (aged 65) Port Harcourt, Rivers State, Nigeria

Lt. Colonel Dauda Musa Komo (1959 – 30 May 2025) was a Nigerian military administrator who was the Administrator of the Rivers State, Nigeria from December 1993 to August 1996 during the military regime of General Sani Abacha. He took office at a time of escalating violence between the Ogoni and Okrika people over crowded waterfront land, combined with Ogoni protest against Shell Oil activities and the environmental destruction of Ogoni land. He reacted aggressively, sending troops to break up demonstrations and arresting leaders of the Ogoni's MOSOP movement.

In January 1994 Shell and other oil companies said they had lost $200 million in 1993 due to unrest in the Delta area, and called for urgent measures. Komo formed the Rivers State Internal Security Task Force from army, navy, airforce, mobile police and state security personnel, headed by Major Paul Okutimo. The force acted brutally, destroying many Ogoni villages, killing or beating the people. A letter that Okuntimo wrote to Komo in May 1994 said "Shell operations still impossible unless ruthless military operations are undertaken". At a press conference on 2 August 1994, Komo and Okuntimo justified the use of terror to force the Ogoni into submission.

On 21 May 1994, four prominent Ogoni leaders were brutally murdered at a meeting of the Gokana Council of Chiefs and Elders. The next day author and MOSOP leader Ken Saro-Wiwa and others were arrested on charges of involvement in the murders. Komo proclaimed in advance that Saro-Wiwa was "guilty of murder". On 31 October 1995 a tribunal announced death sentences for Saro-Wiwa and eight other activists. All nine were executed on 10 November 1995. (In 2009, Royal Dutch Shell agreed a $15.5 million out-of-court settlement in a case brought by relatives of Saro-Wiwa and other Ogoni leaders who accused it of complicity in the human rights abuses at that time, although Shell denied wrongdoing).

Komo continued to detain supporters of the Ogoni people. The president of the National Union of Rivers State Students was arrested after organizing a demonstration on 10 December 1995, International Human Rights Day, to protest the execution of the Ogoni nine. Anyakwee Nsirimovu, executive director of the Institute of Human Rights and Humanitarian Law, Robert Azibaola, President of the Niger Delta Human and Environmental Rescue Organisation (NDHERO) and Stanley Worgu, Director of Human Rights (NDHERO) was detained in April 1996, apparently to prevent them from talking to members of a UN mission who were inquiring into the Saro-Wiwa case.

Komo was relieved of his position in August 1996. After the restoration of democracy in May 1999, he was forced to retire from the army, as were all other former military administrators. In the run-up to the 2003 elections for Kebbi State governor, Komo was among the contenders to be nominated as the People's Democratic Party (PDP) candidate, who by agreement was to come from the Zuru Emirate.

Komo died on 30 May 2025, at the age of 65.
