= Gabriel Toby =

Nigerian economist and politician

Deputy Governor of Rivers State
- In office 1999–2007
- Governor: Peter Odili
- Succeeded by: Tele Ikuru
- Constituency: Rivers State

Personal details
- Born: Gabriel Tamunobiebere George Toby Opobo, Rivers State, Nigeria
- Party: People's Democratic Party
- Spouse: Christie Toby
- Children: Sotonye Toby, Abinye Toby, Ibim Semenitari
- Education: University of Nigeria, Nsukka
- Profession: Economist, Politician

Gabriel Tamunobiebere George Toby is a Nigerian politician of the People's Democratic Party, an economist and a former civil servant who served as Deputy Governor of Rivers State under Governor Peter Odili from 1999 to 2007.

== Early life and education ==
Originally from Opobo, Toby is an alumnus of the University of Nigeria, Nsukka. He studied Economics and received a bachelor's degree in 1963.

== Career ==
Toby worked as a civil servant in various government ministries, rising to the rank of Director General before retiring in 1994. Other offices in which he has served include pro-chancellor, and chairman governing council, University of Benin, pro-chancellor and chairman, governing council, University of Port Harcourt and chairman of council, Rivers State Polytechnic, Bori. In 1999, Toby was chosen as the People's Democratic Party nominee for deputy governor. He was elected eventually and served under Governor Peter Odili. In 2006, he became the first Nigerian to earn the National Merit Award of Accomplished and most Outstanding Deputy Governor in the country.

== See also ==
- List of people from Rivers State
- Deputy Governor of Rivers State
