= Suleiman Saidu =

Nigerian politician

Rear Admiral Suleiman Saidu

Chief of the Naval Staff
- In office September 1993 – November 1993
- Preceded by: Vice Adm. D. P. Omotsola
- Succeeded by: Rear Adm. A. Madueke

Military Governor of Rivers State
- In office July 1978 – October 1979
- Preceded by: Zamani Lekwot
- Succeeded by: Melford Okilo

Personal details
- Born: 1942 (age 83–84) Zaria

Military service
- Allegiance: Nigeria
- Branch/service: Nigerian Navy
- Years of service: 1961-1993
- Rank: Rear admiral

Suleiman Saidu (born 23 February 1938) is a retired Nigerian Navy Rear Admiral who served as Chief of Naval Staff from September to November 1993.

Saidu joined the Nigerian Navy in 1961 and had his basic training at the Britannia Royal Naval College, Dartmouth in the United Kingdom. He took active part in the Nigerian Civil War (1967 - 1970) during the landings and subsequent operations. He attended the Armament Supply and Inspection course at Bombay, India in 1971. He qualified as a Long Gunnery Officer at HMS Excellent in Britain in 1972. Saidu was appointed military governor of Rivers State, Nigeria from July 1978 to October 1979 during the military regime of General Olusegun Obasanjo, handing over power to the elected civilian governor Melford Obiene Okilo at the start of the Nigerian Second Republic.

Saidu served as the captain of NNS Aradu. Prior to taking over the command of the vessel, he was Staff Officer 1 Administration at the Nigerian Defence Academy Kaduna, from where he went on to command the MK 9 corvette NNS Erin-Omi before proceeding to the Defence Services Staff College, Wellington, India in 1982.

Saidu also served as the Flag Officer Commanding Eastern Naval Command (1992-1993) and Flag Officer Commanding Western Naval Command (1993).

Saidu was confirmed by General Sani Abacha as Chief of Naval Staff in September 1993.

He was later replaced by Rear Admiral Allison Madueke for the sake of ethnic balancing.
