= Rivers State Ministry of Women Affairs =

Civil service department in Rivers, Nigeria

Ministry overview
- Jurisdiction: Government of Rivers State
- Headquarters: 4 Eastern By-Pass, Marine Base; Port Harcourt, Rivers State, Nigeria; 4°48′16.65″N 7°0′57.05″E
- Ministry executives: Ukel Oyaghiri, Commissioner; Atosemi Eson Teetito, Permanent Secretary

The Rivers State Ministry of Women Affairs is the civil service department of Rivers State charged with advising the government on policies and programs involving women and gender equality. The ministry was formed in 1997 and took over the functions of the former Rivers State Commission for Women. Its current headquarters are at Marine Base, Port Harcourt.

As of 2016, the commissioner in charge of the ministry is Ukel Oyaghiri while the permanent secretary is Atosemi Teetito.

The ministry implements various programs, including skills acquisition centers for women, the Widows Welfare Scheme, and the Women Development Center scheme for vocational training and empowerment of women across local government areas. It works with national agencies like the National Center for Women's Development and collaborates with women's rights groups and NGOs.

== Functions ==
1. Formulation of policies that promote gender equality and empower women
2. To formulate programmes that will develop the potentials of women and girls
3. To identify problems militating against women and girls
4. To collaborate with government agencies to address societal issues that militate against the advancement of women
5. To provide career guidance and counselling
6. To provide mass literacy involving informal and functional literacy

== List of commissioners ==
The following is a list of commissioners of the Rivers State Ministry of Women Affairs.

- Mediline Ingowari Tador (1997–1999)
- Gloria Fiofori (1999–2003)
- Ibitoru Linda Ofili (2003–2007)
- Nancy Nwankwo (2007)
- Manuela George-Izunwa (2007–2011)
- Joeba West (2011–2015)
- Ukel Oyaghiri (2015–)

== See also ==
- Gender equality
- Women empowerment
- Women in government
