= Vanguard Personality of the Year Awards =

Annual award organized by Vanguard

- Awarded for: To celebrate distinguished Nigerians from all walks of life.
- Country: Nigeria
- Presented by: Vanguard (Nigeria)
- First award: 2007; 19 years ago
- Website: https://www.vanguardngr.com/

Vanguard Personality of the Year Awards is an annual award organized by Vanguard (Newspapers) to honour distinguished Nigerians who have excelled in their chosen careers. The event premiered between 2007 and 2008 as the Bankers' award. It was on hold for four years until 2012, when it was re-introduced and rebranded as Vanguard Personality of the Year Awards. In 2022, the event celebrated its 10th edition in Lagos, Nigeria. Past recipients of the award include; Babajide Sanwo-Olu, Adegboyega Oyetola, Godwin Obaseki, Abdullahi Sule, Rotimi Akeredolu, and Afe Babalola.

== Notable awardees ==
S/n	Awardee	Profession
1	Bola Ajibola	Lawyer
2	Babajide Sanwo-Olu	Politician
3	Afe Babalola	Lawyer
4	Gboyega Oyetola	Politician
5	Aisha Buhari	First lady
6	Godwin Obaseki	Politician
7	Godwin Emefiele	Banker
8	Muhammad Inuwa Yahaya	Politician
9	Femi Otedola	Business man
10	Goodluck Jonathan	Politician and former Nigerian president
11	Azibaola Robert	Lawyer
