= Mu'azu Jaji Sambo =

Nigerian politician

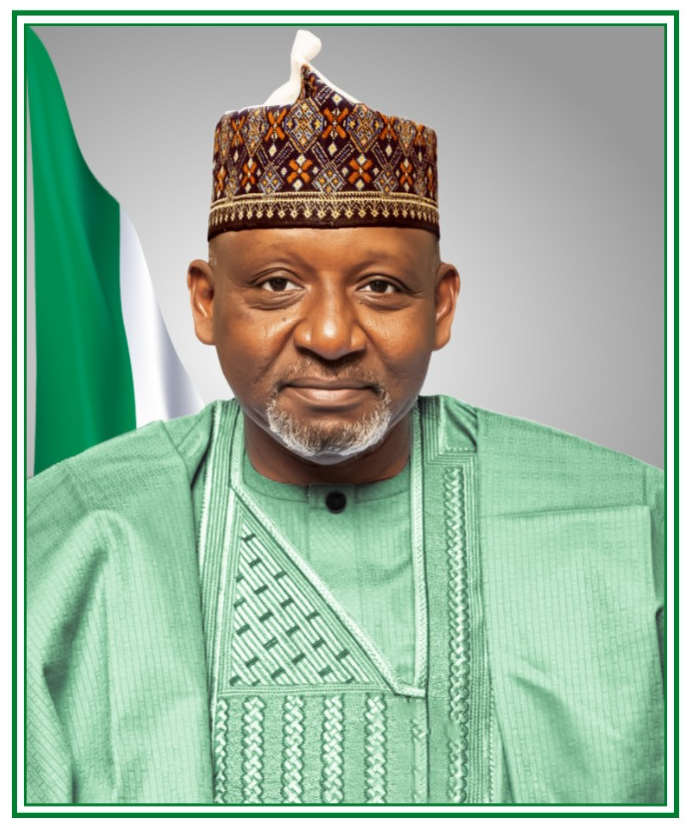

Ministry of Transportation
- In office 13 July 2022 – 29 May 2023
- President: Muhammadu Buhari
- Deputy: Ademola Adewole Adegoroye
- Preceded by: Rotimi Amaechi
- Succeeded by: Sa'idu Ahmed Alkali

Ministry of Works and Housing
- In office 24 December 2021 – 13 July 2022
- Succeeded by: Honourable Umar Ibrahim El-Yakub

Personal details
- Born: 7 September 1959 (age 67) Jalingo, Taraba State, Nigeria
- Party: All Progressive Congress (2014-present)
- Education: Ahmadu Bello University Zaria
- Website: jajisambo.com

Mu’azu Jaji Sambo FNIOB, MCORBON, MNIM, CON, is the former Minister of Transportation of the Federal Republic of Nigeria appointed by President Muhammadu Buhari on 6 July 2022. He was earlier appointed as the Minister of State for Works and Housing in 2021 before he was moved by the President to the Ministry of Transportation.

== Early life and education ==
Mu'azu Jaji Sambo was born in 1959 in Jalingo, Taraba State.

Sambo attended Ahmadu Bello University, Zaria, where he studied building.

== Career ==
In 1984, Sambo began his working career with the Nigerian Ports Authority (NPA), and rose to become Senior Civil Engineer. Later he was a manager at Savannah Bank of Nigeria. He moved to Allied Bank of Nigeria, NICON Insurance Corporation and finally became general manager, Lagos Zone, National Inland Waterways Authority; he retired in 2019.

== Political trajectory ==
Sambo was a member of the All Nigeria Peoples Party in Taraba State. Sambo was appointed Minister of State by the President, Commander-In-Chief of the Armed Forces of the Federal Republic of Nigeria, His Excellency Muhammadu Buhari, GCFR on 24 December 2021 and posted to the Federal Ministry of Works and Housing. On 6 July 2022, he was reassigned to the Ministry of Transportation as the Minister of Transportation.

In the run-up to the 2023 general elections, he was appointed as the Taraba State Coordinator of the Tinubu-Shettima Presidential Campaign Council. which saw the emergence of President Bola Ahmed Tinubu as the President, Commander-in-Chief of the Armed Forces of the Federal Republic of Nigeria.

== Awards and honours ==
In May 2023, he conferred the National Honour of Commander of the Order of the Niger by President Muhammadu Buhari.
