= Chief Judge of Rivers State =

Nigeria judicial position

Chief Judge
- Incumbent; Hon. Justice Simeon Chibuzor Amadi since 26 May 2021
- Judiciary of Rivers State
- Abbreviation: CJ
- Seat: High Court of Justice, Rivers State
- Appointer: Governor of Rivers State
- Term length: Age of 65 years
- Constituting instrument: Constitution of 1999 (Section 271)
- Formation: 1970
- First holder: Justice Michael Holden (1970 - 1976)
- Final holder: Justice Hon. Justice Simeon Chibuzor Amadi (2021-present)
- Website: The Chief Judge

The Chief Judge of Rivers State, also known as the Chief Judge of the High Court of Justice, is the title and office of the head of the judicial branch of Rivers State. The Chief Judge presides over the state's High Court, and is usually the most senior judge of that court.

As of 2021, Hon. Justice Simeon Chibuzor Amadi is currently the Chief Judge of Rivers State.

== Appointment ==
Appointment to the Office is made by the Governor on the recommendation of the National Judicial Council subject to confirmation of the appointment by the Rivers State House of Assembly.

== Duties and responsibilities ==
The Chief Judge of Rivers State has the responsibility of chairing the Judicial Service Commission as well as coordinating the judicial branch. As the judge with most seniority, the Chief Judge administers the oath of office at the Governor's inauguration and may create rules to regulate the operations of the High Court in the state.

== List of Chief Judges ==
No.	Image	Chief Judge	Term of Office
1		Michael H. F. Holden	1970 - 1976
2		Ambrose E. Allagoa	1976 - 1979
3		Donald Graham-Douglas	1979 - 1992
4		Koripamo D. Ungbuku	1992 - 1996
5		Felix N. N. Ichoku	1996 - 2001
6		Iche N. Ndu	2001 - 2013
7		Daisy W. Okocha	4 January 2016 – 15 January 2016
8		Adama Lamikanra	15 January 2016 – 26 May 2021
9		Hon. Justice Simeon Chibuzor Amadi	26 May 2021 - Present

== See also ==
- Judiciary of Rivers State
- Rivers State Ministry of Justice
- Attorney General of Rivers State
