= Government House, Port Harcourt =

Rivers State Government House
- Alternative names: The Brick House; Governor's House

General information
- Status: Completed
- Type: Office and residence of the Rivers State Governor
- Location: Old GRA, Port Harcourt, Rivers State, The Brick House, off Azikiwe Road, Old GRA, Port Harcourt, 500001, Rivers State, Nigeria, Port Harcourt, Nigeria
- Coordinates: 4°46′36″N 7°0′59″E
- Current tenants: Governor of Rivers State
- Opened: 1928
- Renovated: 2004
- Cost: ₦4.2 billion
- Owner: Government of Rivers State

The Rivers State Government House, also known as The Brick House or Governor's House, is the official residence and workplace of the Governor of Rivers State. Located in Old GRA, off Azikiwe Road in Port Harcourt, it has served as the governor's residence and office since its establishment in 1928. The name "Brick House" stems from its original structure, which was built using bricks.

It serves as the venue for the Governor's official business, as well as the many high-level government conferences, receptions, and functions hosted by the occupant. It is located very close to the state secretariat and the Rivers state High court. However it has been remodeled by past governments to suit their modern amenities.

Other events that take place at the Government House, include meetings such as that of the Executive Council, and the swearing-in of new cabinet members. The present occupant of the Brick House is the incumbent Governor of Rivers State, Sir Siminalayi Fubara.

== History ==
The original Brick House, was constructed in 1928, and initially served as the residence for British colonial administrators. After the creation of Rivers State in 1967, it was repurposed as the Governor's office.

In 1987, Military administrator and 5th Governor of Rivers State Anthony Ukpo, oversaw its renovation, which included the addition of a small chapel. The building was eventually retired as the Governor's office when a new Government House, also called the Brick House, was constructed within the same complex during the administration of the 13th Governor of Rivers State, His Excellency, Dr. Peter Odili.

The new Government House, developed as a landmark project by Julius Berger Plc, was executed in four phases. Phases I and II, comprising the Banquet Hall, Office Block, and the Governor's residential quarters, were completed and inaugurated by the 12th President of Nigeria, His Excellency, Chief Olusegun Obasanjo, GCFR on December 2, 2005. Initially budgeted at ₦4.2 billion, the total cost increased due to adjustments during construction and finishing. The foundation-laying ceremony for this ambitious project took place in May 2004.

In recent years, the original Brick House underwent significant renovations and landscaping by the 16th Governor of Rivers State, His Excellency, Barr. Nyesom Wike. Its surroundings were enhanced with gardens, fountains, and lush lawns, cementing its position as an iconic feature of the Government House complex.
