= Habibu Idris Shuaibu =

Nigerian politician

Administrator of Niger State
- In office August 1998 – May 1999
- Preceded by: Simeon Oduoye
- Succeeded by: Abdulkadir Kure

Administrator of Plateau State
- In office 22 August 1996 – August 1998
- Preceded by: Mohammed Mana
- Succeeded by: Musa Shehu

Personal details
- Born: 17 November 1955 (age 69)

Military service
- Allegiance: Nigeria
- Branch: Nigerian Army
- Rank: Colonel

Habibu Idris Shuaibu (born 21 November 1954) was the military administrator of Niger State in Nigeria from August 1998 to May 1999, when he handed over control to the democratically elected Abdulkadir Kure.

Habibu Shuaibu was an aide to General Ibrahim Babangida. In 1989, while at the U.S. Army Command and General Staff College, Fort Leavenworth, Kansas he wrote an unpublished thesis titled "Military Involvement in Politics in Nigeria: The Effect on Nigerian Army". Speaking as one of those who backed General Babangida's putsch on August 27, 1985, he claimed that the reason for the coup against Muhammadu Buhari was that Buhari did not distribute positions to junior officers.

Appointed administrator of Plateau State in August 1996, he persistently urged the people to support and cooperate with the Sani Abacha administration to enable it to accomplish the task ahead.

Habibu Shuaibu retired from the army as a colonel.
