= Azibaola Robert =

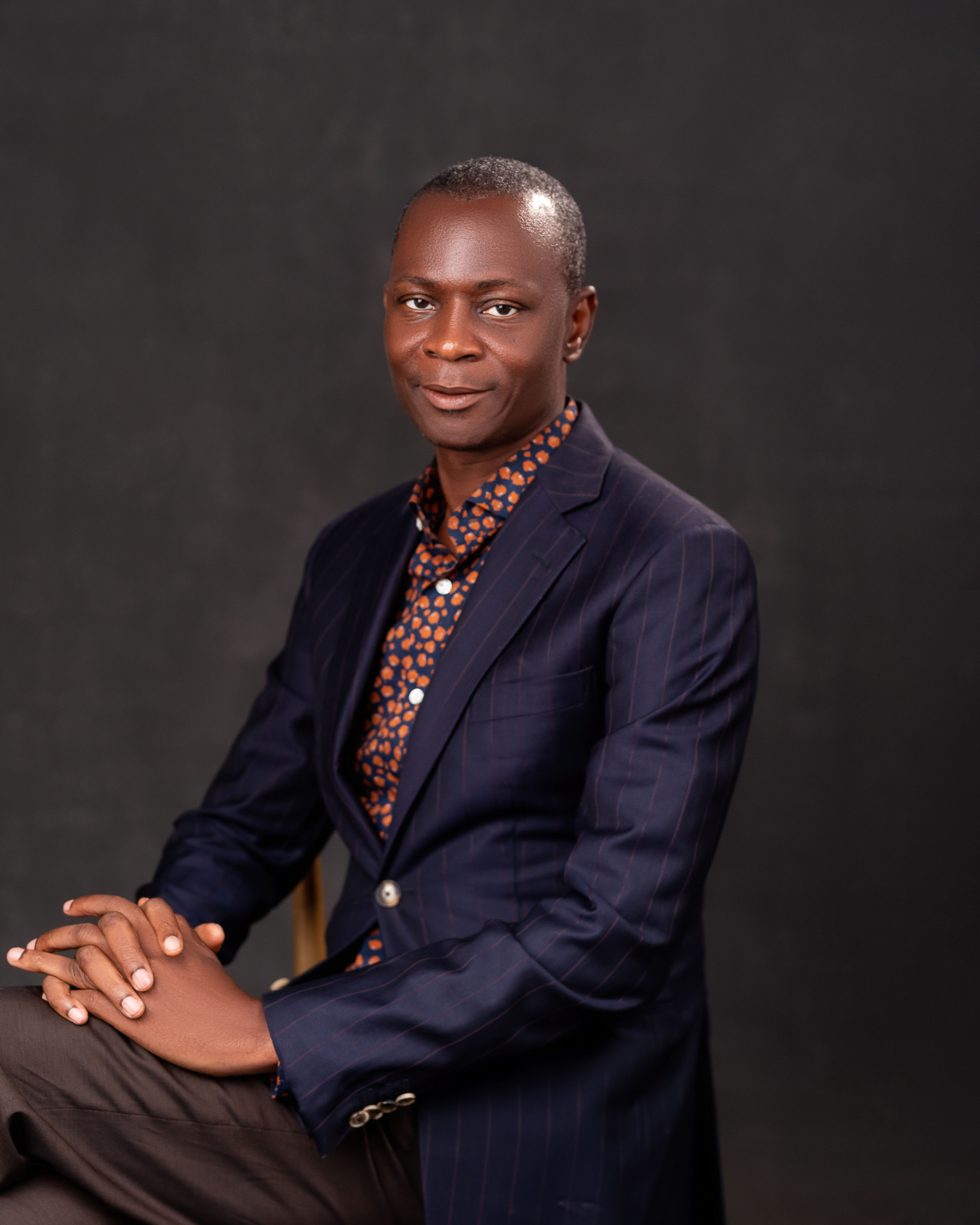
- Born: February 13, 1969 (age 57); Bayelsa State
- Education: Rivers State University
- Occupations: Entrepreneur, Lawyer, human rights and environmental advocate.
- Known for: Environmental advocate
- Awards: Vanguard Personality of the Year Awards

Azibaola Robert, (born 13 February 1969) is a Nigerian entrepreneur, Fellow of the Nigerian Society of Engineers (NSE), industrialist, lawyer, human and environmental rights advocate, founder of Zeetin Engineering Limited, managing director of Kakatar Group, Executive Vice President Preheat Energy, advocate of Tug of War and a receiver of Vanguard Personality award of the year. Robert studied law at the Rivers State University of Science and Technology, Port Harcourt, (now Rivers State University) and was called to the Nigerian bar in 1995.

== Early life and career ==
Robert, was born on 13 February 1969 in the Otakeme community, Bayelsa, in 1969. He studied law at the Rivers State University of Science and Technology before he was called to the Nigerian bar in 1995. In 1999, Robert founded Mangrovetech Limited, a civil engineering company that metamorphosed into Kakatar. In 2018, Azibaola founded Zeetin Engineering to produce high-end technology and heavy-duty equipment to produce the first electrical automobile in Nigeria. Later, the Nigerian Society of Engineers conferred on him a Fellow of the society. In 2021, he initiated a campaign to preserve rainforests and their wildlife in his country. He led the Niger Delta Human and Environmental Rescue Organisation (ND-HERO) to advocate peace and environmental justice in the Niger Delta region. As of 1993, Robert served as the NANS vice president. He is a cousin to Goodluck Jonathan, former president of the federal republic of Nigeria. Robert is an advocate of the re-inclusion of Tug of War into major events like the Olympic games and believes the game can serve as a panacea to save the world from the consequences of climate change. He organized the game at Ogbia Local Government area at Bayelsa State, South South, Nigeria In June 2025, Azibaola Robert was reported to be directly involved in construction work on his residence in Abuja. A photograph published by Vanguard showed him plastering a section of the building himself. According to the report, he stated that the construction site also served as a training space for secondary and university students interested in practical building skills.

== Adventure into the Niger-delta forest ==
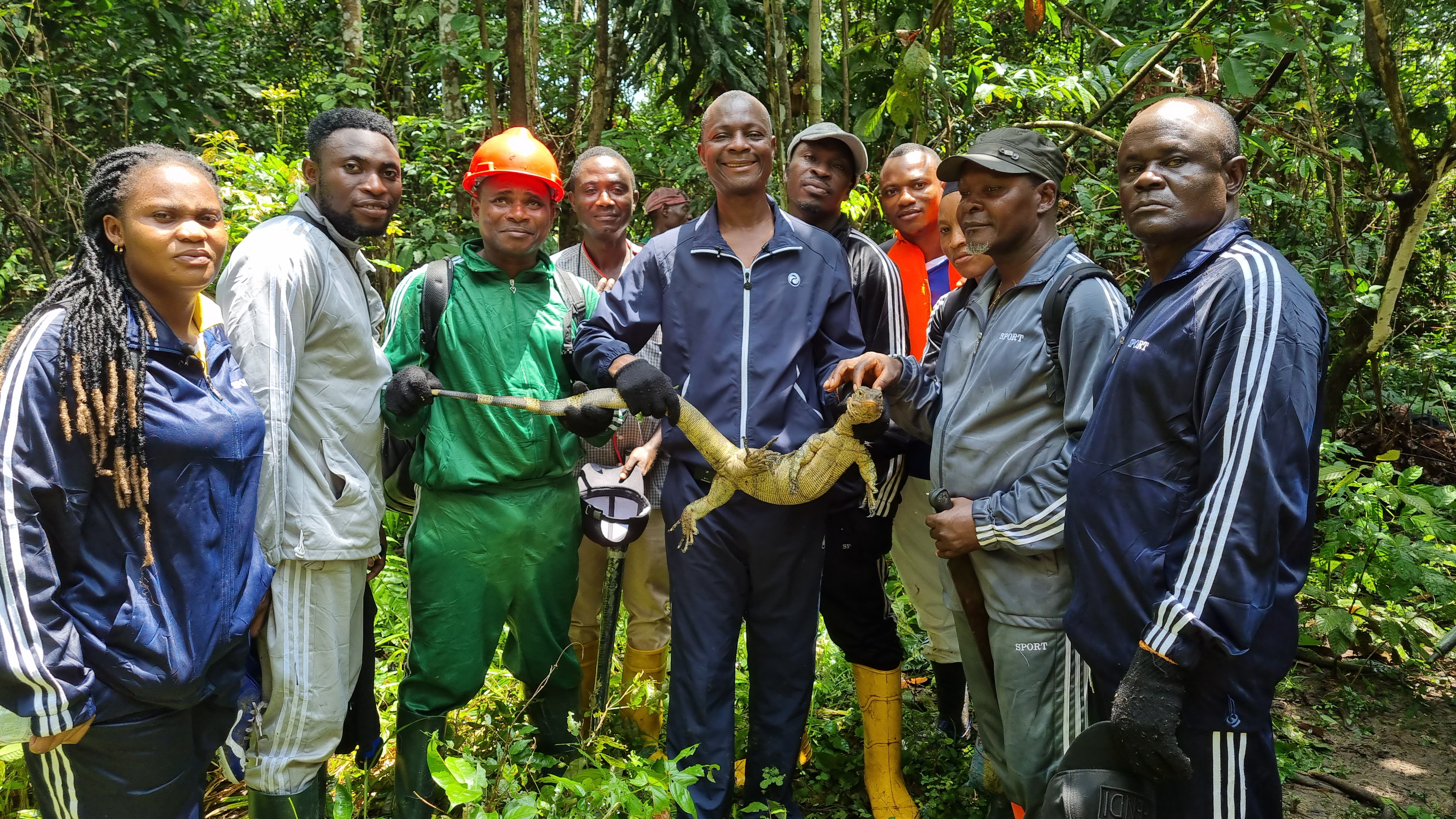
Azibaola rescued a Nile Monitor Lizard during his 14 Days Expedition into Deep Forest

Azibaola underwent a 14 days expedition into one of the Niger Delta deep forests, with his team aimed at showcasing the nature documentary, preservation, and impact of climate change on the entity as a result of the adverse environmental practices, by the inhabitants of the region by seeking collaboration with the ecological enthusiasts, government, and mission-aligned organizations. The two hour documentary-film series highlighted the story of his people and living in the creek. The adventure was a journey of 25 kilometers, from human civilization, while the team covered over 400 kilometers to explore the forest.

== Controversies ==
In 2016, Robert, and his company, One Plus Holding Limited faced charges from the Economic and Financial Crimes Commission (EFCC), for allegedly receiving $40 million from the Office of the former National Security Adviser [NSA], Col. Sambo Dasuki and converting same for personal use. However, he was later discharged and acquitted by a Federal High Court in Abuja.

The case began on June 7, 2016, with Robert and his wife being prosecuted and granted bail of N500million, after they pleading not guilty. The prosecution presented ten witnesses and various documents to support their case by January 23, 2017. On March 18, 2018, Robert's counsel filed a no-case submission, resulting in the court dismissing two out of the nine charges against him and excluding his wife from the case.

According to the Nigerian Tribune, Justice Nnamdi Dimgba of a Federal High Court in Abuja, delivered the case that the EFCC failed to provide enough evidence for the money laundering charge against him for receiving money from Sambo Mohammed Dasuki without any contract agreement. The case was later transferred to the Nigerian Court of Appeal, where a three-person panel led by Justice Stephen Adah decided that the prosecution failed to establish a prima facie case against the defendants.

== Awards ==
Awards and recognitions
Year	Event	Award	Result
2021	Vanguard Personality of the Year Awards 2021	The Innovator of The Year	winner
2022	The Suns Award	The Sun Public Service Award 2023	winner
2022	The Leadership Scorecard Integrated Media	Ecosystem Ambassador of the Year 2022	winner
2023	Annual General Meeting (AGM) and Investiture of the Nigerian Society of Engineers (NSE)	Fellow of the Nigerian Society of Engineers	winner
