= Ernest Olawunmi Adelaye =

Governor of Rivers State, Nigeria

(Nigeria) Military Governor of Rivers State
- In office July 1988 – August 1990
- Preceded by: Anthony Ukpo
- Succeeded by: Godwin Osagie Abbe

Personal details
- Born: 1942 (age 83–84)

Group Captain Ernest Olawunmi Adeleye was appointed military governor of Rivers State, Nigeria from July 1988 to August 1990 during the military regime of General Ibrahim Babangida.

He signed the edict establishing the Rivers State Polytechnic on March 25, 1989, and performed the formal ceremony of the institution on May 19, 1990.

He retired with the rank of air vice marshal.
