= Judiciary of Rivers State =

The Judiciary of Rivers State is a branch of the Government of Rivers State that has sole authority and responsibility for the interpretation and application of the state's laws as well as the adjudication of disputes or controversies.

== Governance ==
The Judiciary consists of eight courts: the High Court of Justice, the Magistrates Courts, the Customary Courts, the Juveniles Courts, the Revenue Courts, the Sanitation Courts, the Mobile Courts and Ports Related Offences Courts. It is governed mainly by the Chief Judge of the High Court of Justice. There are about 26 serving judges in the High Court of Justice, which comprises 10 Judicial Divisions including Port Harcourt, Ahoada, Degema, Nchia, Bori, Omoku, Isiokpo, Okrika, Okehi, and Oyigbo. There are also 44 serving magistrates in the magisterial districts of Abua, Ahoada, Akinima, Bonny, Bori, Port Harcourt, Degema, Elimgbu, Isiokpo, Kpor, Nchia, Ngo, Ndoni, Okehi, Okrika, Omoku, Elele, Oyigbo, Igwuruta, Rumuepirikom, Obio, Eberi-Omuma, Ozuoba, Rumuodomaya, Tai, Emohua, and Ubima. Customary Courts are found in almost every district of the state, although, unlike other courts may operate without legally trained magistrates.

== Judicial system ==
The administrative structure of the Rivers State judicial system is made up of Sections or Directorates under the office of the Chief Registrar. They include: the administration, the library services and documentation, litigation, appeals, magistracy, probate, sheriffs, accounts and records, courts, public relations/protocol, transport, and works/general duties. In some cases, the Chief Registrar may perform the role of the Head of Administration, the Probate Registrar, the Sheriff and the Chief Accounting Officer of the Judiciary. The Chief Registrar is supported by other officiers like the Deputy Chief Registrars handling administration and litigation. Non-judicial officers such as the Assistant Chief Registrars/Sectional Heads, Principal Registrars, Senior Registrars, Higher Registrars, Registrars, Clerical Officers and other categories of staff also assist the judges and magistrates in the administration of justice.

== See also ==
- Government of Rivers State
- Rivers State Police
