= Rufus Ada George =

Former Governor of Rivers State

2nd Governor of Rivers State
- In office January 1992 – November 1993
- Deputy: Peter Odili
- Preceded by: Godwin Osagie Abbe
- Succeeded by: Dauda Musa Komo

Personal details
- Born: 11 July 1940 (age 85) Okrika, Rivers State
- Spouse: Rose A. George

Rufus Ada George (born 11 July 1940) was the second Governor of Rivers State, Nigeria, holding office from January 1992 until November 1993 during the Nigerian Third Republic.

== Background ==
Ada George was born on 11 July 1940 at George-Ama, Okrika, Rivers State. He qualified as an accountant, and became a fellow of the Institute of Chartered Accountants of Nigeria. He was an accountant with Shell Petroleum Development Company of Nigeria from April 1972 to December 1979, where he left as Assistant Chief Accountant to join the Rivers State government. Under the administration of Chief Melford Okilo, he was the Secretary to the State Government and had held other positions including Director-General, Works Directorate and Director of Tribunals and Enquiries. Later he was the deputy managing director of the investment company Dangil Holdings Limited (1984–1991), before being elected governor of Rivers State.

== Governor of Rivers State ==
Ada George was elected on the National Republican Convention (NRC) platform as Governor of Rivers State in the preliminary elections sponsored by General Ibrahim Babangida as a step towards full democracy with the Third Republic. He took office in January 1992. His deputy governor was Peter Odili, who was himself elected governor in 1999. In 1993 the Ogoni people in Rivers State, led by the Movement for the Survival of the Ogoni People, protested against exploitation by Shell, Ada George's former employer. Violence resulted. The Ogoni considered that the governor was encouraging the conflict. There was a delay of two months before federal troops were deployed to restore the peace.

Ada George's tenure ended when General Sani Abacha took power in a military coup in November 1993. Ada George retired into private life until the ban on politics was lifted by Abacha's successor Abdulsalami Abubakar in 1998.

== Later career ==
After the return to democracy in 1999, Ada-George became a leader of the All Nigeria Peoples Party (ANPP) in Rivers State. Violence broke out in Okrika, Rivers State between 22 and 24 September 2001. During another outbreak of violence in Okrika in 2002, reportedly initiated by the ruling People's Democratic Party (PDP), both his houses were burned down. In June 2008 the state Truth and Reconciliation Commission heard accusations that Ada George had sponsored the bush boys in the September 2001 outbreak in an attempt to install the All People's Party (APP) in the area.

== See also ==
- List of governors of Rivers State
