= Tele Ikuru =

Nigerian engineer and politician

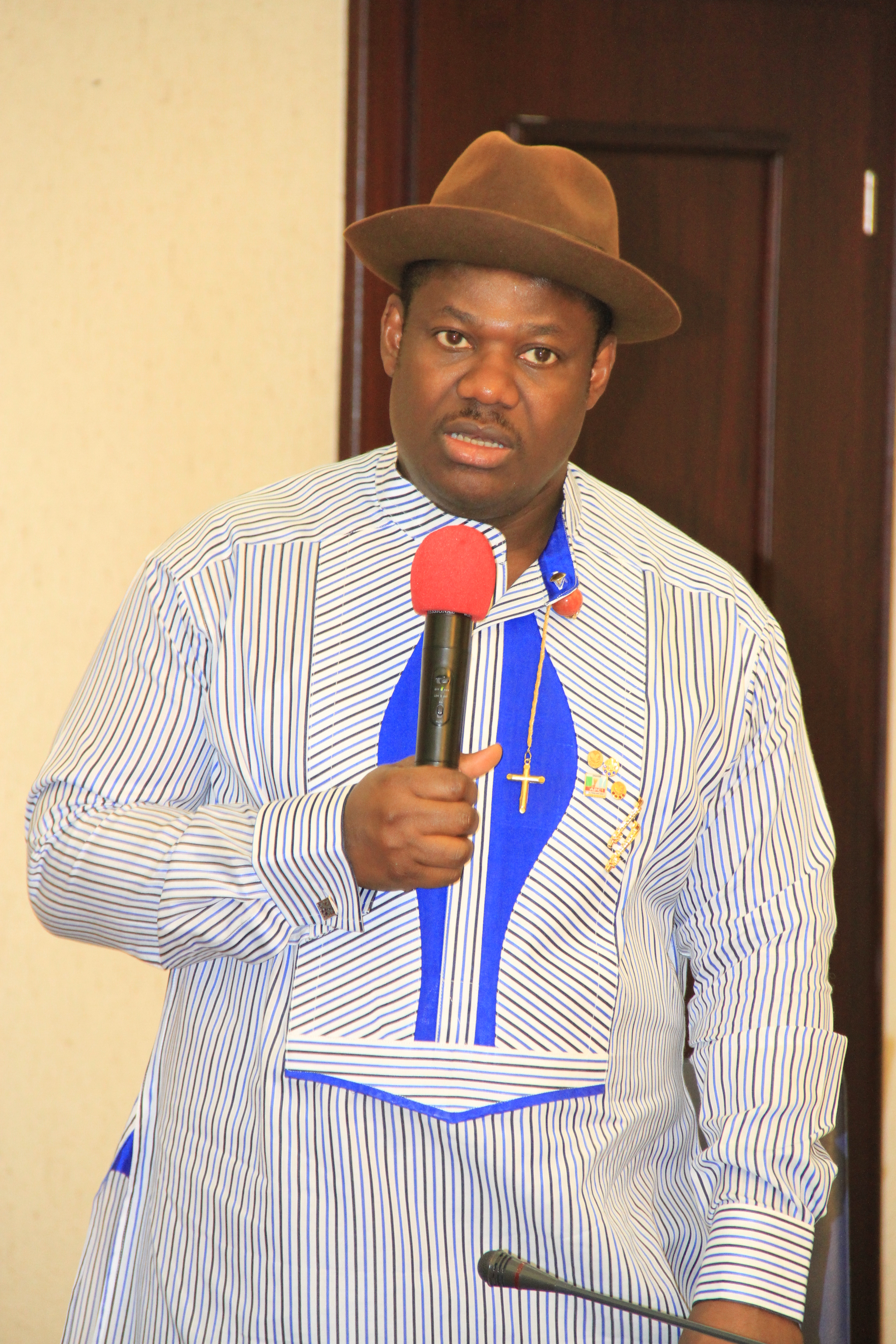

4th & 5th Deputy Governor of Rivers State
- In office 26 October 2007 – 29 May 2015
- Governor: Chibuike Amaechi
- Preceded by: Tele Ikuru
- Succeeded by: Ipalibo Banigo
- In office 29 May 2007 – 25 October 2007
- Governor: Celestine Omehia
- Preceded by: Gabriel Toby
- Succeeded by: Tele Ikuru

Personal details
- Born: Telenyem Renner Ikuru; 24 February 1966 (age 60) Port Harcourt, Rivers State, Nigeria
- Party: People's Democratic Party
- Spouse: Dr Mina Ikuru
- Education: Rivers State University of Science and Technology

Telenyem Renner Ikuru (born 24 February 1966), commonly known as AudioTele Ikuru, is a Nigerian engineer and politician. He was first elected Deputy Governor of Rivers State in 2007 on a PDP ticket with Gov. Celestine Omehia. After the court annulled Omehia's election that year, he was picked to serve under Chibuike Amaechi and was reelected to the office in 2011.

Ikuru was among state officials who joined the All Progressive Congress with Gov. Amaechi in 2013. He later defected back to the People's Democratic Party on 22 March 2015.

== Early life and education ==
Tele Ikuru was born and raised in Port Harcourt, Rivers State. His family roots are originally from Ikuru town Andoni. In 1992, he earned a Bachelor of Technology (B.Tech.) degree in mechanical engineering from the Rivers State University of Science and Technology.

== Career ==
Tele Ikuru was a Principal Technical Assistant at the Shiroro Hydroelectric Power Station during his National Youth Service Corps (NYSC) programme. After completing his service (which lasted a year), Ikuru worked for various investment and construction companies, then taught at Kenneth Commercial School and Allenco Comprehensive Secondary School. He also worked at the Logos Community Bank in Port Harcourt. In 1996, he got a job with the Shell Petroleum Development Company, where he worked as an Oil/Chemical Spill Clean-Up Supervisor until 1999.

Tele Ikuru served as Commissioner of Agriculture and Natural Resources from 1999 to 2003. He was moved to Housing and Urban Development as pioneer Commissioner from 2004 to 2006. In 2007, Ikuru ran for, and was elected Deputy Governor alongside gubernatorial candidate Celestine Omehia. After their election was annulled that year, he was adopted and served two terms in office under Governor Chibuike Amaechi.

== Personal life ==
Tele Ikuru is married to Dr Mina Ikuru, a pediatrician, and they have four children.

== Honors and awards ==
Ikuru has received several awards and honors, which include:

- Fellow, Institute of Corporate Executives of Nigeria (FICEN).
- Fellow, Nigerian Institute of Mechanical Engineers (FNIMechE).
- Fellow, Nigerian Society of Engineers (FNSE).
- Member, Council for the Regulation of Engineering in Nigeria (COREN).
- Member, American Society of Mechanical Engineers (ASME).

== See also ==
- List of people from Rivers State
- Deputy Governor of Rivers State
