= Deputy governor of Rivers State =

Second highest-ranking official in the executive branch of Rivers State in Nigeria

Deputy Governor of Rivers State
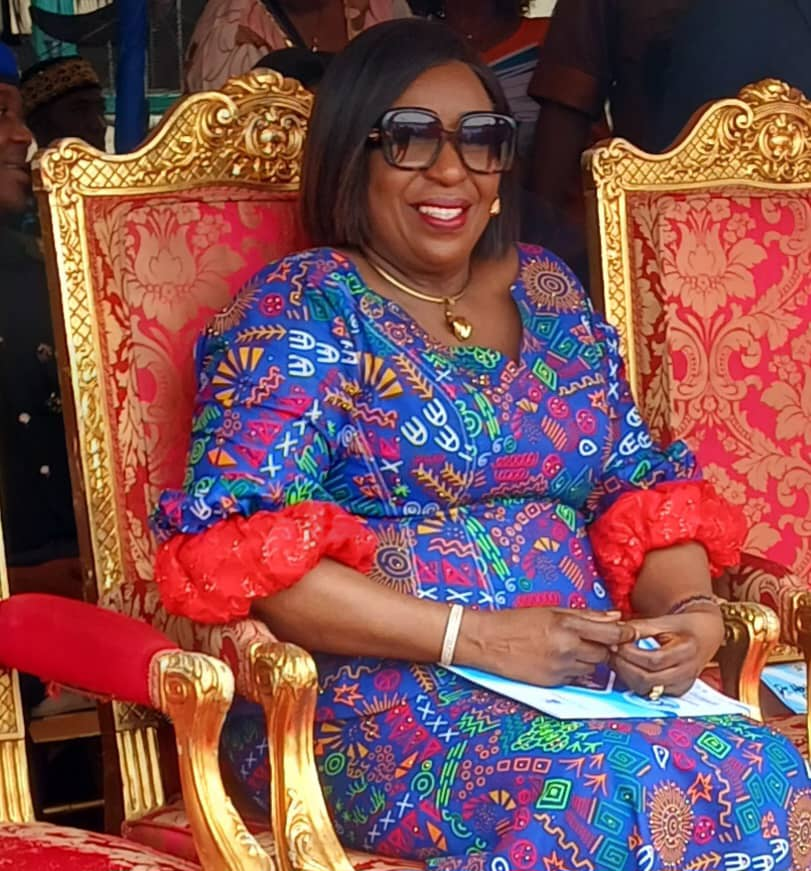
- Incumbent; Ngozi Odu since 29 May 2023 (Powers and duties suspended since 18 March 2025)
- Executive branch of the Government of Rivers State
- Style: Her Excellency; The Honorable (alternative)
- Member of: Executive Council
- Seat: Port Harcourt
- Term length: Four years
- Inaugural holder: Frank Eke
- Formation: 1 October 1979
- Salary: ₦2,112,215
- Website: http://www.riversstate.gov.ng

The deputy governor of Rivers State is the second highest-ranking official in the executive branch of Rivers State, after the governor. The Constitution of 1999 requires that the gubernatorial nominee of a party select his or her deputy governor running mate after the primary. The deputy governor's duties include assisting the governor and replacing them in the case of death, resignation, removal, impeachment, absence or incapacity due to illness.

Since 1999, individuals who have held this office have been members of the PDP. Ngozi Odu is the current deputy governor since 29 May 2023.

== Qualifications ==
As in the case of the governor, in order to be qualified to be elected as Deputy Governor, a person must:

- be at least thirty-five (35) years of age;
- be a Nigerian citizen by birth;
- be a member of a political party with endorsement by that political party;
- have School Certificate or its equivalent.

== Election and tenure ==
The deputy governor is elected through popular vote on a ticket with the governor for a term of four years. They may be re-elected for a second term but may not serve for more than two consecutive terms.

== List of deputy governors ==
| # | Picture | Name | Took office | Left office | Party |
|---|---|---|---|---|---|
| 1 | – | Frank Eke | October 1979 | December 1983 | NPN |
| 2 | – | Peter Odili | January 1992 | November 1993 | NRC |
| 3 | – | Gabriel Toby | 29 May 1999 | 29 May 2007 | PDP |
| 4 | – | Tele Ikuru | 29 May 2007 | 25 October 2007 (annulled) | PDP |
| 5 | | Tele Ikuru | 26 October 2007 | 29 May 2015 | PDP |
| 6 | | Ipalibo Banigo | 29 May 2015 | 29 May 2023 | PDP |
| 7 | | Ngozi Odu | 29 May 2023 | Suspended | PDP |
Parties: National Party of Nigeria (NPN), National Republican Convention (NRC), People's Democratic Party (PDP)

== See also ==
- Governor of Rivers State
- List of governors of Rivers State
