= Sam Ewang =

Nigerian military administrator (born 1952)

Group Captain Sam Ewang (born 1952) was Military Administrator of Ogun State, Nigeria from August 1996 to August 1998 during the military regime of General Sani Abacha, and then Administrator of Rivers State until May 1999 handing over power to the elected governor Peter Odili at the start of the Nigerian Fourth Republic.

Ewang ran for governor of Akwa Ibom in April 2007 on the All Nigeria People's Party (ANPP) platform. After the election he accused the People's Democratic Party PDP and Independent National Electoral Commission (INEC) of rigging the results. In November 2007, the ANPP declared that the purported suspension of Ewang, its governorship candidate for Akwa Ibom State in the 2007 general elections, was illegal.

In a June 2009 interview, Ewang held the present government of Akwa Ibom responsible for the recent spate of kidnappings, robbery and hired killings, accusing government agents of being involved. In February 2010, Chris Nyong Ekong, former commissioner for youths and sports in Akwa Ibom, was arraigned for kidnap, conspiracy and murder. There had been a series of recent kidnappings. Ewang alleged that prominent Ibibio people were being targeted.

Ewang is one of the leaders of the National Democratic Movement (NDM). In January 2010, the NDM was involved in talks with the "mega party" being planned by Mohammadu Buhari, Atiku Abubakar, Olu Falae, Bola Tinubu and Anthony Enahoro, with the purpose of defining a common platform to oppose the PDP. Ewang was appointed to an integration committee that also included Olu Falae, Balarabe Musa, Pat Utomi and Arthur Nwakwo, charged with ensuring the full coalition of all the parties and eminent stakeholders.
