= Melford Okilo =

Nigerian politician (1933–2008)

Melford Obiene Okilo

11th Governor of Rivers State
- In office October 1979 – December 1983
- Deputy: Frank Eke
- Preceded by: Suleiman Saidu
- Succeeded by: Fidelis Oyakhilome

Member of Parliament
- In office 1956–1964
- Constituency: Brass

Minister of Commerce and Tourism
- In office December 1993 – July 1994

Senator for Bayelsa East
- In office May 1999 – May 2003

Personal details
- Born: 30 November 1933 Emakalakala, Ogbia, Bayelsa State, Nigeria
- Died: 5 July 2008 (aged 74)

Melford Obiene Okilo (30 November 1933 – 5 July 2008) was a Nigerian politician who served as a member of parliament from 1956 to 1964 and as a minister during the Nigerian First Republic. He was the first elected governor of Rivers State, Nigeria, serving from 1979 to 1983 during the Nigerian Second Republic. Later he represented Bayelsa East as a senator in the Nigerian Fourth Republic from 1999 to 2003.

== Early career ==
Okilo was born on 30 November 1933 at Emakalakala, Ogbia, Bayelsa State, and was of Ijaw origin. He qualified as a lawyer, but entered politics at the age of 23. Okilo was a member of parliament between 1956 and 1959. In December 1959, he was re-elected to represent the Brass constituency on the Niger Delta Congress platform. The prime minister, Sir Abubakar Tafawa Balewa, later appointed him parliamentary secretary and minister. He played a significant role in the enactment of the Niger Delta Development Board (1961), which sought to address problems of the neglected Niger Delta region.

While visiting New York in 1965, he came across a book about Walter Russell, The Man Who Tapped the Secrets of the Universe, which had a profound influence on his thought. Walter Russell's University of Science and Philosophy later published his books, and in the late 1990s, he served as president of the university.

During the military regime of General Yakubu Gowon, Okilo served in the Rivers State government, first as Commissioner for Education, and then as Commissioner for Agriculture, Fisheries, and Natural Resources, from 1971 to 1975.

== Second republic ==
During General Olusegun Obasanjo's regime, he was a member of the Constituent Assembly (1977–78) leading to the Nigerian Second Republic. He was chairman of the Rivers State branch of the National Party of Nigeria (NPN) (1978–1983), and was elected on the NPN platform as governor of Rivers States in 1979. As governor, Okilo established the Rivers State University of Science and Technology. He opened the Independent Power Plant at Imiringi in Ogbia local government area, now in Bayelsa State, a major gas turbine power station. He created fifty development units for the much neglected rural areas, introducing a policy where local people were given the responsibility and power to govern and develop their local communities. He undertook programs to reclaim land, control erosion, construct roads and canals, and build rural housing scheme and industrial estates.

President Shehu Shagari awarded him the honour of Commander of the Order of the Federal Republic of Nigeria in 1983. He was re-elected on the NPN platform in 1983, losing office when General Muhammadu Buhari took power in a military coup in December 1983. Soon after taking power, Buhari established military tribunals to try public officers from the Shagari era who had been accused of embezzling public funds. In July 1986, he was acquitted of the charges against him and regained his freedom following a judicial review of the tribunals and later freed by Ibrahim Babangida.

== Later career ==
In June 1989, Okilo was a speaker at a conference on World Balance: Action to Save our Planet held in Aspen, Colorado. Writing in 1992 on the question of oil revenue sharing, Okilo referred to traditional morality, saying that "when an individual kills or finds a big fish or animal, the villagers or community expresses their appreciation ... by first giving him or her the best part of the animal or fish before the rest of the meat or fish is shared." He served as Minister of Commerce and Tourism during the General Sani Abacha regime. In January 1994, he was a member of a ministerial committee that toured Ogoniland following disturbances by Ogoni protesters against Shell activities in the area. Although the committee's report was sympathetic to the plight of minorities in the oil-producing areas, little was done.

Okilo was dropped from the government in July 1995 as the military consolidated their power. Returning to the United States, he became president of the University of Science and Philosophy, which had earlier published his philosophical writings including his 1991 book The Law Of Life.

== Fourth republic ==
In January 1999, shortly before the return to democracy and while running for office, Okilo was briefly detained by the outgoing military government following disturbances among the Ijaw in the Niger Delta. Okilo was elected Senator for Bayelsa East on the Peoples Democratic Party (PDP) platform, serving from May 1999 to May 2003, but failed to be re-elected in 2003. As senator, he served as vice-chairman of the committee on natural gas and chairman of the committee on identify card.

He remained a director of the University Of Science And Philosophy, and became a director of the board of Vision In Action, an institute formed in 2003 to share and communicate experience on issues of leadership, creativity, visionary and strategic thinking. In 2005, he read his own obituary following an erroneous story that he had died. Later he addressed a press conference, saying he was in a coma for four days and was mistaken for dead. Speaking in July 2006, in Brixton, London, Okilo called on leaders of the Ijaw to take their case over sharing oil and gas revenue to the International Court of Justice. At the same time, he asked youths of the area to give up violence, and seek peaceful means to address their grievances.

After a prolonged illness, Okilo was moved back to Bayelsa from his Abuja residence by his administrator, Hauwa Ogbeide-Ihama. Okilo died at the age of 74 in Yenagoa, Bayelsa State, on 5 July 2008.

== Bibliography ==
- Melford Okilo (1989). Nigeria: the search for political stability. Riverside Communications. ISBN 978-30333-4-4.
- Melford Okilo (1991). The law of life. University of Science and Philosophy. ISBN 1-879605-03-1.
- Melford Okilo (1992). Art of government and the Okilo administration. Riverside Communications. ISBN 978-30333-5-2.
