= Anthony Ukpo =

Nigerian governor (1947–2021)

Stephen Anthony Ukpo

Military Administrator and 5th Governor of Rivers State
- In office 26 August 1986 – July 1988
- Preceded by: Fidelis Oyakhilome
- Succeeded by: Ernest Olawunmi Adelaye

Personal details
- Born: 16 July 1947 Okpoma, Yala LGA, Cross River State, Nigeria
- Died: 6 September 2021 (aged 74)

Stephen Anthony Ukpo (16 July 1947 – 6 September 2021) was Minister of Information and Culture, and then Governor of Rivers State, Nigeria, from August 1986 until July 1988 during the military administration of General Ibrahim Babangida.

== Early life and education ==
Anthony Ukpo began his studies at St. Augustine's Seminary, which he attended from 1961 to 1965. Transitioning to a military career, he enrolled at the Nigerian Defence Academy, Kaduna and subsequently completed his cadet training at the Mons Officer Cadet School, Aldershot in the United Kingdom in 1968. Ukpo furthered his tactical instruction at the School of Infantry in the United States. Between 1976 and 1977, he undertook studies at the American-based LaSalle Extension University. He later attended the Armed Forces Command and Staff College, Jaji, from 1977 to 1978, followed by the United States Army Command and General Staff College in the United States from 1979 to 1980. Over the course of his education, Ukpo ultimately earned a Master of Science (M.Sc.) degree and his Pass Staff College (psc) designation.

== Military career ==
Ukpo was born in Okpoma, Yala, Cross River State, on 16 July 1947. Joining the army, he was appointed Company Commander (1968), Battalion Commander (1969 and 1971 – 1973), Brigade Major (1970) and Instructor, Nigeria Defence Academy, Kaduna (1973–1974).

He was a member of the inner circle of army officers who arranged the bloodless coup on 27 August 1985 when General Muhammadu Buhari was replaced by General Ibrahim Babangida. After the coup he was appointed a member of the AFRC.

He was appointed deputy director, Defence Intelligence Agency (1985).

On 12 September 1985, he was sworn in as Minister of Information and Culture.

He was appointed military governor of Rivers State on 26 August 1986. In this post, he inaugurated the provisional council of the Rivers State Polytechnic.

He reassigned to become principal staff officer to President Ibrahim Babangida in July 1988. In this role in April 1990 Ukpo told reporters that 10 officers and more than 150 soldiers from the lower ranks had been arrested in an attempted coup attempt against Babangida.

He was retired as a Brigadier.

== Later career ==
His wife, Sally Ufuoma Ukpo, was a teacher and in 2006 was running a travel and tours company.

After retirement, he became a member of the board of directors of Skye Bank.

When Cross River state Governor Donald Duke put up the Metropolitan Hotel for sale, Ukpo was said to have made the highest bid of N600 million. His offer was turned down, and the hotel later sold for N200 million.

In September 2008 he presented the results of a feasibility study for a mono-rail system of transportation in Port Harcourt. Ukpo was the leader of a partnership to construct the railway.

In October 2009 the Rivers State government signed an agreement with TSI Property and Investment Holdings to undertake the project at a cost of $318 million. Ukpo said that the mono-rail would be the first of its kind in Africa.

In an interview in July 2009, Ukpo protested strongly against the recent transfer of 76 oil wells from Cross River State to Akwa Ibom State, and expressed hope that a committee set up by President Umaru Yar'Adua would find a politically reasonable solution.

He has been a vocal voice in politics right from the grass root to the federal level.

In 2021 he died from COVID-19.
