= Rivers State High Court of Justice =

Highest court of Rivers State, Nigeria

The High Court of Justice is the highest court of Rivers State, Nigeria. It is composed of the Chief Judge of Rivers State and such number of judges appointed by the Governor on the recommendation of the National Judicial Council and subject to confirmation by the Rivers State House of Assembly.

The High Court of Justice has unlimited original jurisdiction with regard to civil and criminal legal cases. Furthermore, the High Court of Justice exercises appellate jurisdiction over lower courts within the state. At present, there are court branches at Isiokpo, Omoku, Port Harcourt, Degema and Ahoada.
