= Celestine Omehia =

Fourth governor of rivers state, Nigeria

4th Governor of Rivers State
- In office 29 May 2007 – 25 October 2007
- Deputy: Tele Ikuru
- Preceded by: Peter Odili
- Succeeded by: Chibuike Amaechi

Personal details
- Born: 15 September 1959 (age 66)
- Party: People's Democratic Party

Sir Celestine Ngozichim Omehia (born 15 September 1959) was the fourth Governor of Rivers State, Nigeria from 29 May 2007 to 25 October 2007. He is a member of the former national governing People's Democratic Party (PDP). He is married to Mrs. Anthonia Omehia (née Itakpe) and they have three children (Keturah, Kelechi and Kechikamma).

Omehia served as Rivers State Commissioner of Education between February 1992 and November 1993 and was later appointed an adviser to Governor Peter Odili.

Omehia was declared the winner of the Rivers State gubernatorial election of 2007, held on 14 April 2007, despite wide scale vote rigging and violence. He was sworn in as Governor of the oil-producing Niger Delta State on 29 May 2007, taking over from Dr. Peter Odili (also a member of PDP).

In June 2007, Shell Petroleum Development Company announced a plan to relocate its headquarters from Port Harcourt to Lagos for security reasons. Omehia appealed to the people to help fight against hostage takers, who were harming the state economy. In September 2007, Celestine Omehia won approval for a supplementary state budget of N53.2 billion in addition to the approved 2007 budget of N179 billion. The supplementary budget was almost entirely earmarked for capital projects. Tell Magazine stated that Omehia may have been under pressure to settle "election liabilities".

On 25 October 2007, the Supreme Court annulled Omehia's governorship election, ruling that Chibuike Amaechi, not Omehia, was the PDP's legitimate candidate. Amaechi had won the PDP primaries, but the party had substituted Omehia at the last moment due to allegations of graft. In October 2009, Omehia asked the supreme court to review their opinion but the court denied the request.
