= Peter Odili =

Nigerian politician (born 1948)

13th Governor of Rivers State
- In office 29 May 1999 – 29 May 2007
- Deputy: Gabriel Toby
- Preceded by: Sam Ewang
- Succeeded by: Celestine Omehia

2nd Deputy Governor of Rivers State
- In office 1992–1993
- Governor: Rufus Ada-George
- Preceded by: Frank Eke
- Succeeded by: Gabriel Toby

Personal details
- Born: 15 August 1948 (age 78)
- Party: Peoples Democratic Party
- Spouse: Mary Ukaego
- Occupation: Politician

Peter Otunuya Odili (born 15 August 1948) is a Nigerian politician who was the third elected Governor of Rivers State in Nigeria from 29 May 1999 to 29 May 2007. Odili is a member of the Peoples Democratic Party (PDP).

== Background ==
Peter Odili was born on 15 August 1948 in the Ogba/Egbema/Ndoni Local Government Area of Rivers State, Southern Nigeria. Odili graduated from the Medical School of the University of Nigeria, Nsukka, and pursued post-graduate work in Tropical Medicine at the University of Liverpool in the United Kingdom. Dr. Peter Odili is married to Justice Mary Ukaego Odili (b. 12 May 1952).

In 1988/89, Dr. Odili was elected member and leader of Rivers State Delegates to the Constituent Assembly. In 1992, he was elected as the Deputy Governor of Rivers State. After the Nigerian Third Republic ended, he was again elected to the National Constitutional Conference and became the Conference Committee Chairman on State Creation. Odili thereafter became the National Secretary of the defunct Democratic Party of Nigeria (DPN).

== Governorship ==
Odili was elected Governor of Rivers State during the 1999 Rivers State gubernatorial election, and was reelected in April 2003.

In September 2004, Amnesty International wrote an open letter to Odili expressing deep concerns for protection of human rights of civilians in and around Port Harcourt, detailing an increasingly alarming security situation in Rivers State, due to fighting allegedly between rival armed groups. In December 2004, a gang of armed youths believed to be members of the Egbesu cult attacked Odili's convoy along the East-West Road in Port Harcourt killing two people, one a policeman In March 2009, the Rivers State Truth and Reconciliation Commission, headed by retired Supreme Court Justice Kayode Eso, blamed the crisis during Odili's period of office on both the state and the Federal Governments, particularly the administration of President Olusegun Obasanjo. The report outlined interwoven problems of failed governance, chieftaincy tussles, cultism, politics of acrimony and insurgency.

During his governorship, Rivers State was in theory one of the wealthiest states in the country [i.e. Lagos state, Delta state and Rivers State, due to oil and other business infrastructure], but Odili instituted relatively few improvements. In January 2007, the Economic and Financial Crimes Commission (EFCC) under Nuhu Ribadu issued an interim report on the governor that pointed to severe implications of fraud, conspiracy, conversion of public funds, foreign exchange malpractice, money laundering, stealing and abuse of oath of office.

At around the same time Human Rights Watch issued a report detailing pervasive patterns of corruption and mismanagement at the state and local levels under Odili's administration. In February 2007, three months to the end of his second term in office, Odili filed a suit challenging the powers of the EFCC to probe his administration in Rivers State.

In November 2006, Odili announced that he would run for president in the 2007 election under the ruling PDP. However a day before the PDP's presidential primaries held on 16 December 2006, Odili stepped down from the contest, paving the way for another governor, Umaru Musa Yar'Adua, to emerge as the party's flag bearer.

== Later career ==
In June 2008, Odili defended his record before the Rivers State Truth and Reconciliation Commission, denying the charges that had been made against him.

As of December 2007, the office of Attorney General then headed by Michael Aondoakaa had refused to file any defense in court against Odili's claim that the EFCC was not authorized to investigate his administration. In March 2008, a Port Harcourt court ruled that the EFCC could not investigate state finances. In September 2009, a Federal High Court in Abuja issued an interim injunction stopping the EFCC from arresting, detaining, prosecuting or embarrassing Odili over a N189m bank debt. However, a few days later the EFCC summoned Odili over alleged debts owed to five banks whose Managing Directors and board had recently been removed by the Central Bank of Nigeria (CBN).

In December 2009, the New York Times published an article about the kidnapping industry in Africa. The author talked to a man called Adiele Nwaeze (a professional kidnapper), who accused Odili of having paid him to help rig an election ten years ago by robbing ballot boxes. Odili denied the accusation.

In September 2010, it was reported that former military head of state Ibrahim Babangida, who planned to be a presidential candidate in the 2011 election, was in discussions with Odili over being his running mate as vice-presidential candidate. The choice was due in part to a close relationship between Odili and Raymond Dokpesi, the director general of Babangida's campaign.

== See also ==
- List of governors of Rivers State
- Deputy Governor of Rivers State
