= Rotimi Amaechi =

Nigerian politician (born 1965)

Right Honourable Rotimi Amaechi CON
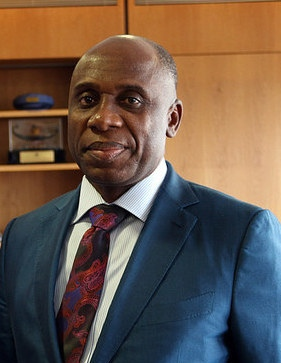

Minister of Transportation
- In office 21 August 2019 – 16 May 2022
- President: Muhammadu Buhari
- Preceded by: himself
- Succeeded by: Mu'azu Jaji Sambo
- In office 11 November 2015 – 28 May 2019
- President: Muhammadu Buhari
- Preceded by: Audu Idris Umar
- Succeeded by: himself

Governor of Rivers State
- In office 25 October 2007 – 29 May 2015
- Deputy: Tele Ikuru
- Preceded by: Celestine Omehia
- Succeeded by: Ezenwo Nyesom Wike

Speaker of the Rivers State House of Assembly
- In office 2 June 1999 – 4 June 2007

Personal details
- Born: Chibuike Rotimi Amaechi; 27 May 1965 (age 61) Ikwerre, Eastern Region (now in Rivers State), Nigeria
- Party: African Democratic Congress (ADC). (2025-Date)
- Other political affiliations: Peoples Democratic Party (1999–2014) All Progressives Congress (2014–2025)
- Spouse: Judith Amaechi
- Children: 3
- Education: Bachelor of Arts (Honours) in English Literature; Bachelor of Laws (Honours)
- Alma mater: University of Port Harcourt; Nigerian Law School; King's College London
- Occupation: Politician; lawyer
- Website: www.rotimiamaechi.com

Chibuike Rotimi Amaechi CON (born 27 May 1965) is a Nigerian politician, who served as the federal minister of transportation of Nigeria from 2015 to 2022 under the administration of President Muhammadu Buhari. He resigned to contest for Nigeria's presidency under the governing All Progressive Congress (APC). He had previously served as governor of oil-rich Rivers State, from 2007 to 2015 and earlier, as speaker of the Rivers State House of Assembly from 1999 to 2007. On 9 April 2022, Amaechi declared interest to contest in the presidential election in 2023. He polled second position in the APC presidential primaries held in June 2022 behind eventual president Bola Tinubu with 316 delegate votes against Tinubu's 1271 votes. He is currently a member of the African Democratic Congress (ADC).

== Background ==
Amaechi was born in Ubima Community, Ikwerre Local Government Area of Rivers State to the family of the late Elder Fidelis Amaechi and Mary Amaechi. His first and last names are Igbo meaning “God is strength or power” and “who knows tomorrow” respectively. He was raised in Diobu, a densely populated neighbourhood in Port Harcourt.

Amaechi had his primary education at St. Theresa's Primary School from 1970 to 1976. He later earned his West African Senior School Certificate in 1982 from Government Secondary School, Okolobiri. Amaechi received a Bachelor of Arts degree (Honours) in English Studies and Literature from the University of Port Harcourt in 1987, where he was the president of the National Union of Rivers State Students (NURSS).

He completed the mandatory National Youth Service Corps (NYSC) in 1988, and thereafter joined Pamo Clinics and Hospitals Limited owned by Peter Odili, where he worked until 1992. He was also a director of several companies, including West Africa Glass Industry Limited and Risonpalm Nigeria Limited.

== Early political career ==
During the transition to the Third Nigerian Republic, Amaechi was secretary of the National Republican Convention in Ikwerre Local Government Area of Rivers State. Between 1992 and 1994, he was special assistant to the deputy governor of Rivers State, Peter Odili, his boss believed in Amaechi as a young man with potential in politics and brought him under his wing. In 1996, he was the Rivers State's secretary of the Democratic Party of Nigeria (DPN) caretaker committee during the transition programme of General Sani Abacha.

== Rivers State House of Assembly (1999–2007) ==
In 1999, he contested and won a seat to become a member of the Rivers State House of Assembly to represent his constituency. He was subsequently elected speaker of the House of Assembly. Amaechi was elected chairman of Nigeria's Conference of Speakers of State Assemblies. In May 2003, he was re-elected speaker. In 2003, when the National Assembly moved to hijack the legislative functions of the State House of Assembly as enshrined in the constitution, he and his colleagues took the matter to the Supreme Court.

As speaker, Amaechi used his close working relationship with Governor Peter Odili to increase the harmonious relationship between the executive and legislative arms of government in Rivers State, until he launched a campaign against the state government, and verbally attacked the image of the state governor, in an effort to succeed Odili as governor in 2007.

== Governor of Rivers State ==
In 2007, Amaechi contested and won the People's Democratic Party (PDP) primary for Rivers State Governor in 2007. His name was substituted by the party, an action which he challenged in court. The case eventually got to the Supreme Court. He became governor on 26 October 2007, after the Supreme Court ruled that he was the rightful candidate of the PDP and winner of the April 2007 governorship election in Rivers State.

His administration invested in infrastructure development, construction of roads and bridges, sticking to the vision of connecting all parts of the state by road. The governor was also committed to urban renewal and modernization of transportation services. His administration began building a monorail to provide mass transportation within the city of Port Harcourt. Some power plant projects (Afam, Trans Amadi, Onne) were also built to improve power supply in the State.

He was re-elected for a second term on 26 April 2011. In August 2013, Amaechi was amongst seven serving governors who formed the G-7 faction within the PDP. In November 2013, Amaechi alongside five members of the G-7 defected to the new opposition party the All Progressives Congress (APC) where he became the director general of Muhammadu Buhari's presidential campaign.

In March 2026, Former Rivers State Governor and ex-Minister of Transportation, Rotimi Amaechi, joined the African Democratic Congress (ADC), completing his registration at Ward 8 in Ubima, Ikwerre Local Government Area of Rivers State.

In May 2026, he contested in the ADC presidential primaries which he lost to Former Vice President, Atiku Abubakar

Minister of Transportation

In 2015, following Buhari's election, Amaechi was appointed to his cabinet as federal minister of transportation. In July 2019, he was re-nominated for ministerial appointment by President Buhari. Amaechi was asked to take a bow and go during his screening by the Senate.

== Major Achievements as Minister of Transportation ==
- 326KM Warri - Itakpe Standard Gauge Rail line.
- 157KM Lagos - Ibadan Standard Gauge Rail line.
- Extension of 8.72KM Lagos - Ibadan Rail line to Lagos port complex to create port efficiency.
- Construction of 790KM segment 3 of Ibadan - Ilorin - Minna - Kano Rail line.
- 186KM Abuja - Kaduna Standard Gauge Rail line.
- 284KM Kano - Maradi Standard, with 103 km branch line to Kano - Dutse, Ground breaking.
- Rehabilitation of 1178 km Port-Harcourt - Maiduguri narrow Gauge Rail line.
- Transport University in Daura, Katsina State.
- Establishment of Kajola Wagon Assembly Plant.
- E - Ticketing on Abuja - Ibadan Route.
- Training of Engineers in China to Localise Technology.
- Rehabilitation of Railway Village Agbor.
- Construction of Railway Ancillary facility yard in Agbor.
- 18 new wagons delivery of narrow gauge line Lagos - Kano
- 150 qualified Nigerians given full international scholarship to undergraduate and graduate courses in China.
- 50 Engineers trained for Railway infrastructure development of standard gauge railway modernization.
- 23 officers for resident understudy training in China for maintenance of the new rolling stocks.
- 11,300 jobs created from the on-going rail modernization projects.
- 377 wagons, 64 coaches, 21 locomotive purchased including DMU.
- 32 train stations constructed in the three standard gauge routes.
- Construction of Rail line at the Kaduna Inland Dry Port to evacuate cargoes.
- Warri - Itakpe Train Service Commences haulage with 16 wagons of 96 NNPC gas pipes.
- Total sum of ₦460,464,002,77 was paid into the escrow account from revenue received from Abuja - Kaduna train services to repay the loan.
- Offa - Kano - Offa - Train Moving 2,000 passengers on a week.
- Rehabilitation of 41 km of road network with 50 number of culvert.
- Commissioning of the North - West zonal coordinating office complex by the Nigerian Shippers Council.
- Establishment of container loading and off-loading points along the railway tract at Ebute - Metta, Ijoko and Omi - Adio in Ibadan.
- Granting of Incentive to vessels on Harbour dues for the use of Eastern Port.
- Commissioning of Nigerian Shippers Council zonal office in Jos.
- Repossession of the Calabar port harbour village village which has been a subject of litigation for several years.
- Bonny Deep Seaport Project.
- Industrial Park in Port Harcourt.
- Construction of Lekki, Deep Seaport.
- Commissioning of Kaduna Inland Dry Port.
- Dala Inland Dry Port in Kano.
- Proposed Establishment of Maritime Bank, to develop the maritime sector in West Africa
- Restructuring of Maritime Academy of Nigeria to meet international standard, with international certification from UK.
- Building of faculties and purchase of simulators for first han training for cadets.
- Sponsorship of 400 cadets securing sea time berths of cadets trained under the Nigeria seafarers development programme.
- NIMASA secured sea time berths for over 550 cadets in various countries with issuance of CoC in 2020.
- Conversion of Lilly pond container terminal to a vehicle transit area for ease of cargo evacuation.
- Introduction of electronic Call - Up system by NPA to substantially address the problem of traffic gridlock using technology in Lagos ports.
- Ministry of transportation partners with Lagos State Government on defacing of the marina.
- Commissioning of six new Tugboat by NPA.
- Reconstruction of Wharf Road Apapa that was abandoned for over 10 years.
- Commissioning of the Port training institute and simulator facilities to boost human capacity development by NPA.
- First transport minister to visit NITT after 20 years by Governing Council.
- Completion of Jetty Construction at Yenagoa.
- Construction of Boat Terminal in Kogi and Adamawa State.
- Rehabilitation of Control Towers in Delta, Lagos, and TinCan Island Port.
- Ending of 10 years legal tussle between NIWA and Lagos State Government.
- Modular floating Dock by NPA.
- Purchase of 17 special mission vessels 2 special mission Aircraft and 3 Helicopters for Deep Blue Project.
- Nigeria receives the largest container vessel ever to berths at Onne-Port.

== Corruption allegations ==
Since leaving office in 2015, Amaechi has been the subject of corruption allegations by his successor Nyesom Wike. Wike accused him of using state funds to finance President Muhammadu Buhari's campaign during the 2015 presidential election through the sale of Rivers state-owned oil and gas assets, and fraudulently misappropriating the proceeds of the sale amounting to US$309 million. Amaechi has persistently denied the allegations against him. In 2018, he acknowledged that despite Buhari's anti-corruption war corruption still exists within the administration.

=== Controversy over fraud again in 2022 ===
In May 2022, the Supreme Court of Nigeria granted the Rivers State panel of enquiry to probe Amaechi over an alleged ₦96 billion fraud.

== Personal life ==
He is married to Judith Amaechi and they have three boys. He is a Catholic and a Knight of the order of Saint John (KSJ).

On 27 May 2021, Amaechi released his debut single titled 'Blessed The People The Lord Has Chosen As His Heritage' in collaboration with his wife, Judith in commemoration of his 56th birthday. On 19 November 2022, Amaechi announced on his Twitter handle that he is now a certified graduate of law alongside pictures of his convocation.

== Awards ==
Amaechi holds the national honour of Commander of the Order of the Niger (CON).

== See also ==
- List of people from Rivers State
- List of governors of Rivers State
- Cabinet of Nigeria
