= Governor of Rivers State =

Head of the government of Rivers

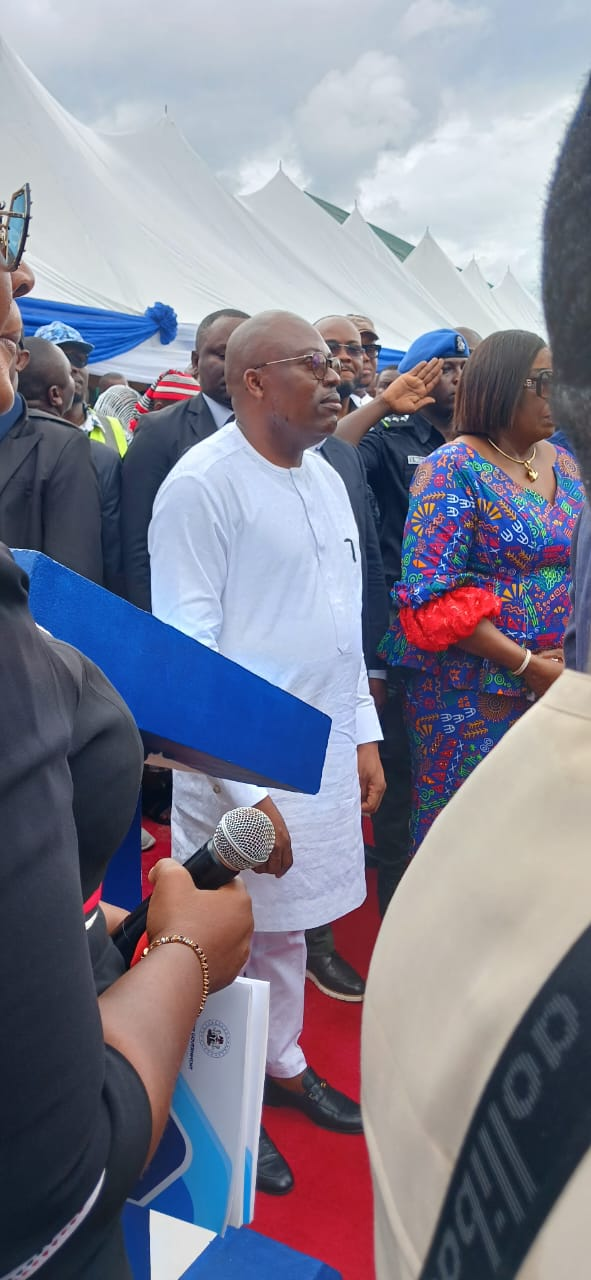
- Incumbent; Siminalayi Fubara since 18 September 2025
- Executive Branch of the Government of Rivers State
- Style: His Excellency
- Member of: Executive Council
- Residence: Brick House
- Seat: Port Harcourt
- Appointer: Direct Popular Vote
- Term length: Four years, renewable once consecutively
- Inaugural holder: Melford Okilo
- Formation: 1 October 1967 (59 years ago)
- Deputy: Deputy Governor of Rivers State
- Salary: ₦5,623,705 (2020)
- Website: governor.riversstate.gov.ng

The governor of Rivers State is the chief executive of the Rivers State government and is one of the governors of the thirty-six states of Nigeria. The governor is supported by the deputy governor, both popularly elected for a term of four years (maximum of two terms). The governor, as head of the executive branch, has the power to appoint and remove commissioners responsible for each of the state's ministries, the heads of parastatals and the state-owned bodies with specific regulatory or administrative duties. He appoints judicial officers based on the recommendation of the state judicial service commission. The Governor cannot be a member of the state's House of Assembly.

== History ==
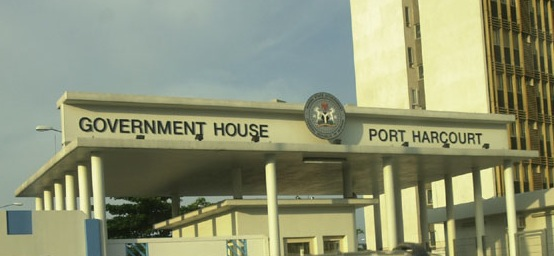
Government House, Port Harcourt

Since achieving statehood in 1967, seventeen individuals have held the power to govern Rivers State, a majority of whom were military officers. Alfred Diete-Spiff, a navy commander and member of the Supreme Military Council, served as the first military governor of the state, after it was created from part of the old Eastern Region, Nigeria. He held office from May 1967 until July 1975 during the administration of General Yakubu Gowon and is the state's only military governor to serve two consecutive four-year terms. In October 1979, Melford Okilo became the first elected governor of Rivers State and ruled until December 1983.

Three governors in the state's history have served two consecutive terms. They are: Dr. Peter Odili (1999–2007), Rt. Hon. Chibuike Amaechi (2007–2015) and Barr. Nyesom Wike, DSSRS (2015-2023). Rivers State's shortest-serving governor was Celestine Omehia who served only five months in office before the Supreme Court annulled his election on 25 October 2007.

== Election and qualification ==
The governor and deputy governor are directly elected on the same ticket by popular vote for four-year terms, and are limited to two consecutive terms, for a total of eight years. Qualifications required for an individual aspiring to become the governor of Rivers State are contained in section 177 of the 1999 Constitution, as amended. According to the Constitution, an individual may become governor if they meet the following criteria: at least thirty-five years of age, a birth citizen of Nigeria, a member of a political party with endorsement by that party, and education up to School Certificate level or equivalent.

== Powers and functions ==
=== Executive powers ===
Most executive power lies with the governor whose responsibility is to enforce state laws. They serve as the head of government with supreme authority over the Executive Council. Excluding the deputy governor, they appoint commissioners, heads of government agencies, special advisers and judicial officers subject to the House's approval. The governor has the duty to attract investments, promote business and implement political as well as economic initiatives.

=== Legislative powers ===
Under the Constitution, every bill passed by the House of Assembly must be presented to the governor for approval before it becomes law. The governor may choose to sign it and make it law, veto it and return it to the House, or take no action, however. If they veto the bill, a two-thirds majority of the House may override it, and the bill will become law without the governor's signature. If the governor does not act, the bill will automatically become law after a 30-day period.

=== Judicial powers ===
Judicial officers are appointed by the governor on the recommendation of the State Judicial Service Commission subject to confirmation of the appointment by the Rivers State House of Assembly. Should a vacancy arise in the office of the Chief Judge or the President of the Customary Court of Appeal, the governor can appoint the next most senior judge of those courts to act for a period of three months.

Section 212, subsection (1) and (2) further empowers the Governor to issue pardons and reprieves, commute sentences, or remit fines and forfeitures imposed for the commission of offenses against, or for the violation of the state laws. Such authority must be exercised on the advice of the Rivers State Advisory Committee on the Prerogative of Mercy, and should not be wielded independently.

== Oath of office ==
Governors take the following oath:

“I do solemnly swear that I will be faithful and bear true allegiance to the Federal Republic of Nigeria; that as the Governor of Rivers State, I will discharge my duties to the best of my ability, faithfully and in accordance with the Constitution of the Federal Republic of Nigeria and the law, and always in the interest of the sovereignty, integrity, solidarity, well-being and prosperity of the Federal Republic of Nigeria; that I will strive to preserve the fundamental objectives and directive principles of state policy contained in the Constitution of the Federal Republic of Nigeria; that I will exercise the authority vested in me as governor so as not to impede or prejudice the authority lawfully vested in the President of the Federal Republic of Nigeria and so as not to endanger the continuance of federal government in Nigeria; that I will not allow my personal interest to influence my official conduct or my official decisions; that I will to the best of my ability preserve, protect and defend the Constitution of the Federal Republic of Nigeria; that I will abide by the Code of Conduct contained in the Fifty Schedule to the Constitution of the Federal Republic of Nigeria; that in all circumstances, I will do right to all manner of people, according to law, without fear or favour, affection or ill-will; that I will not directly or indirectly communicate or reveal to any person any matter which shall be brought under my consideration or shall become known to me as Governor of Rivers State, except as may be required for the due discharge of my duties as governor; and that I will devote myself to the service and well-being of the people of Nigeria. So, help me God.”

== Gubernatorial removal ==
Although a governor is elected to serve a complete four-year term during the gubernatorial elections, in exceptional cases, before a term of such four years expires, the officeholder may be replaced or removed as the case may be, through death, or if an election is annulled by a competent court of law or impeachment by a two-thirds majority of the House of Assembly.

== See also ==
- List of governors of Rivers State
- Government of Rivers State
