= 2023 Rivers State gubernatorial election =

2023 gubernatorial election in Rivers State, Nigeria

- 18 March 2023
- Opinion polls
- Registered: 3,537,190
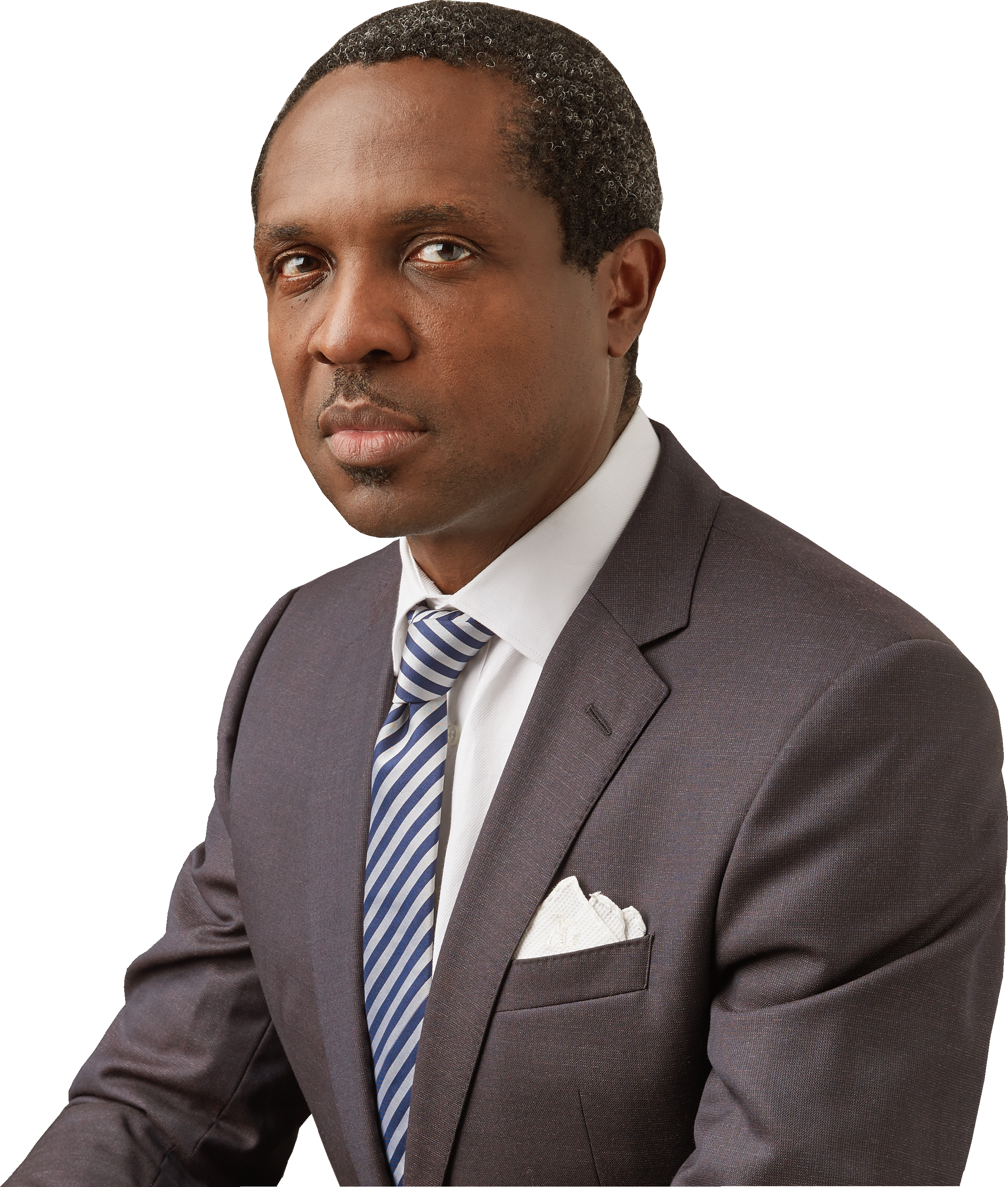
	PDP
Nominee	Siminalayi Fubara	Tonye Cole
Party	PDP	APC
Running mate	Ngozi Odu	Innocent Barikor
Popular vote	302,614	95,274
Percentage	62.53%	19.69%
	SDP	LP
Nominee	Magnus Abe	Beatrice Itubo
Party	SDP	LP
Running mate	Patricia Wudhiga Ogbonnaya	Kinanee Barikpoa
Popular vote	46,981	22,224
Percentage	9.71%	4.59%
Governor before election
Ezenwo Nyesom Wike
PDP
Elected Governor
Siminalayi Fubara
PDP

The 2023 Rivers State gubernatorial election was held on 18 March 2023, to elect the Governor of Rivers State, concurrent with elections to the Rivers State House of Assembly as well as twenty-seven other gubernatorial elections and elections to all other state houses of assembly. The election — which was postponed from its original 11 March date — will be held three weeks after the presidential election and National Assembly elections. Incumbent PDP Governor Ezenwo Nyesom Wike was term-limited and could not seek re-election to a third term.

Party primaries were scheduled for between 4 April and 9 June 2022 with the Peoples Democratic Party nominating former state Accountant-General Siminalayi Fubara on 25 May while the All Progressives Congress nominated businessman Tonye Cole on 26 May. On 25 October, a Federal High Court ruling nullified all Rivers APC primaries but the ruling was overturned by the Court of Appeal in January 2023.

After collation completed on the day after the election, INEC declared Fubara as the victor. In the official results, Fubara won about 303,000 votes (~63% of the vote) to defeat Cole with about 95,000 votes (20% of the vote), Abe with nearly 47,000 votes (~10% of the vote), and Itubo with roughly 22,000 votes (5% of the vote). The results were immediately rejected by the runners-up due to widespread reports of irregularities and violence. The ensuing legal challenge case eventually reached the Supreme Court, which upheld the election of Fubara in a ruling in January 2024.

== Electoral system ==
The Governor of Rivers State is elected using a modified two-round system. To be elected in the first round, a candidate must receive the plurality of the vote and over 25% of the vote in at least two-thirds of state local government areas. If no candidate passes this threshold, a second round will be held between the top candidate and the next candidate to have received a plurality of votes in the highest number of local government areas.

== Background ==
Rivers State is a highly populated, diverse state in the South South with major oil and natural gas reserves along with industrial centres. Despite its vast oil revenues, the state has several major issues with pirates and illegal oil bunkering gangs in riverine areas while urban areas have overcrowding and intense environmental pollution.

Politically, the 2019 elections were a continuation of the state PDP's control as the state APC's inability to hold valid primaries led to its disqualification by a court. PDP presidential nominee Atiku Abubakar won the state by 50% and the party gained all three senate seats while also sweeping the House of Representatives elections. On the state level, the PDP also retained its House of Assembly majority and Wike won the gubernatorial election by a wide margin

Ahead of Wike's term, the aims for his second term were infrastructure, fiscal discipline, economic development, and unity. In terms of his performance, Wike was commended for infrastructural development, healthcare improvements, investments in sport, and pushing against illegal oil bunkering. However, his administration was criticized for its months-long delay in forming a cabinet, his unconstitutional declaration of Rivers as a "Christian state" and poor response to the demolition of a mosque, spending billions of naira to purchase luxury cars for lawmakers and judges, attempting to illegally ban protests during the height of the 2020 End SARS demonstrations, his perceived obsession with starting public disputes with other elected officials, the irregular payment of government salaries and pensions, and disrespecting traditional rulers. Wike also came over fire for his autocratic moves to crackdown on opposition by banning protests multiple times and most notably, when he had intraparty rival and House of Representatives member Farah Dagogo arrested and jailed for weeks to prevent him from running for governor. Another key source of controversy was his handling of the Oyigbo killings in November 2020, when Army personnel went on rampage attacks against Igbo young men in Oyigbo after five soldiers were killed by IPOB; Wike repeatedly denied any Army wrongdoing and justified the week-long military occupation of the area.

== Primary elections ==
The primaries, along with any potential challenges to primary results, were to take place between 4 April and 3 June 2022 but the deadline was extended to 9 June. Leaders in ethnic groups like the Ogoni called on parties to nominate a non-Ikwerre as Ikwerres have held the governorship since 2007. Furthermore, despite making up a significant percentage of Rivers' population, no Ogoni person has ever held the governorship or deputy governorship, leading to calls for the formal zoning of party nominations to the Ogoni-majority Rivers South East Senatorial District. These calls, coupled with other claims that the governorship ought to rotate between upland and riverine areas, have led to pressure on parties to nominate someone from riverine areas or more specifically, Ogoni-majority areas. However, no major party has yet closed their primaries to candidates from the other districts. While neither major party formally zoned their nominations, both the APC and PDP nominated politicians from riverine areas.

=== All Progressives Congress ===
The long-running dispute between former governor and federal Minister of Transportation Rotimi Amaechi and former senator Magnus Abe which led to the Rivers APC's disqualification in 2019 continued ahead of the primary as their factions held separate party congresses and elected different leadership in 2021; national APC leadership later accepted the results of the Amaechi-supported congress as legitimate. As an extension of the party crisis, there were disputes in the Rivers APC over the prospect of zoning the gubernatorial nomination as Amaechi was in favor of zoning to the South East while Abe fought against making a formal zoning decision. By April 2022, it was clear that the party rift had not been bridged as Amaechi and his allies met to select a "consensus party nominee," settling on Tonye Cole who would have been the APC nominee in 2019 if the party was not disqualified. While some aspirants agreed to the arrangement and dropped out, Abe and his allies made it clear that they did not recognize Cole as the party's choice with an Abe-aligned politician deriding Cole as simply "a business associate of" Amaechi. There were also protests from others within the party that decried the opaque process and the choice of Cole as he has never held elected office and supposedly lacks political structures in the state. Despite the objections, the party confirmed Cole as its consensus pick; although the press release noted that since the meeting was not a formal party process, Cole was not formally the party nominee. However, the party backing of Cole did not resolve the controversy as more candidates questioned the pick and its process.

On 20 April 2022, the APC National Executive Committee announced the party's schedule for gubernatorial primaries, setting its expression of interest form price at ₦10 million and nomination form price at ₦40 million with a 50% nomination form discount for candidates younger than 40 while women and candidates with disabilities get free nomination forms. Forms were to be sold from 26 April to 6 May until the deadline was later extended to 10 May then 12 May. After the submission of nomination forms by 13 May, candidates were screened by a party committee on 14 and 15 May while 16 May was the date for the screening appeal process. Ward congresses and LGA congresses were set for between 7 and 9 May to elect delegates for the primary. Candidates approved by the screening process advanced to a primary set for 26 May, in concurrence with other APC gubernatorial primaries; challenges to the result could be made the next day.

In the days before the primary, the party crisis deepened as Abe's camp rejected the ad hoc delegate congresses and protested at the state party secretariat. On the primary date, Abe boycotted and preemptively rejected the primary's proceedings before the indirect primary held and resulted in Cole emerging as the APC nominee after results showed Cole winning over 77% of the delegates' votes. In his acceptance speech, Cole thanked delegates and Amaechi before asking Abe and others to unite the party. He would go onto select former MHA Innocent Barikor—an ethnic Ogoni from Gokana—as his running mate. Despite the unification plea, Abe and two other former primary aspirants left the party in July. Abe would go on to obtain the SDP gubernatorial nomination. However, a lawsuit from Abe-supporting delegates who alleged that they were refused the ability to vote in primaries led to the annulment of the APC primary by a Federal High Court on 25 October. The Rivers APC protested the ruling, claiming that the court had no jurisdiction over an internal party matter. The Court of Appeal sided with the APC in January 2023, reinstating Cole as the nominee.

==== Nominated ====
- Tonye Cole: businessman and son of former ambassador Patrick Dele-Cole
  - Running mate—Innocent Barikor: former House of Assembly member for Gokana

==== Eliminated ====
- Magnus Abe: member of the NNPC Board (2020–present) and former senator for Rivers South East (2011–2015; 2016–2019) (defected after the primary to successfully run in the SDP gubernatorial primary)
- Sokonte Davies: former Nigerian Ports Authority official
- Ojukaye Flag-Amachree: former Asari-Toru Local Government Chairman
- Ibinabo Michael West: former Commissioner for Transportation
- Bernard Mikko: former House of Representatives member for Khana/Gokana (1999–2003)

==== Withdrew ====
- Biokpomabo Awara: 2019 AAC gubernatorial nominee
- Francis Ada Ebenezer: accountant and preacher
- Dawari George: former House of Representatives member for Akuku Toru/Asari Toru and former Commissioner for Energy & Natural Resources (defected after the primary to successfully run in the AA gubernatorial primary)
- Dakuku Peterside: former Director-General of the Nigerian Maritime Administration and Safety Agency (2016–2020), former House of Representatives member for Andoni–Opobo–Nkoro (2011–2015), 2015 APC gubernatorial nominee, former Commissioner of Works (2007–2011), and former Opobo–Nkoro Local Government Chairman (2002–2003)
- Tonye Princewill: 2015 LP gubernatorial nominee, 2007 AC gubernatorial nominee, and son of former Amanyanabo of the Kalabari Kingdom Theophilus J.T. Princewill (defected after the primary)
- Mina Tende: former Ogu–Bolo Local Government Chairman

==== Results ====
Candidates' vote share
1. Tonye Cole (77.6%)
2. Ojukaye Flag-Amachree (14.9%)
3. Other candidates (7.47%)

APC primary results
Party	Candidate	Votes	%
APC	Tonye Cole	986	77.58%
APC	Ojukaye Flag-Amachree	190	14.95%
APC	Sokonte Davies	49	3.86%
APC	Ibinabo Michael West	43	3.38%
APC	Bernard Mikko	2	0.16%
APC	Magnus Abe	1	0.08%
Total votes		1,271	100.00%
Invalid or blank votes		12	N/A
Turnout		1,283	Unknown

=== People's Democratic Party ===
Unlike the state APC, the Rivers PDP did not face much internal strife directly ahead of the party primary as Wike held direct control over much of the party. However, as the primary neared, struggles over the primary method and Wike's leadership style began to be unveiled from reports culminating in a large protest at the Rivers PDP secretariat on 13 April 2022. A backer of the protest and intraparty Wike opponent, House of Representatives member Farah Dagogo was running for governor until Wike accused Dagogo of sponsoring thugs to attack the party secretariat on 27 April and ordered the police to arrest him the day before PDP gubernatorial screening. Dagogo, who had already bought and submitted forms to run in the primary, attempted to attend the mandatory party screening exercise on 28 April but was detained by police and held in jail indefinitely. Dagogo's aides along with civil society groups decried the arrest as politically motivated and called for Dagogo's release but the PDP simply disqualified him from the primary due to 'non-attendance at screening.'

On 16 March 2022, the national PDP announced its gubernatorial primaries' schedule, setting its expression of interest form price at ₦1 million and the nomination form price at ₦20 million with a 50% discount for candidates between 25 and 30. Forms were to be sold until 1 April but the party later extended the deadline four times before reaching a final deadline of 22 April. After the submission of nomination forms by 25 April, candidates were screened by a party committee on 28 April while 2 May was the rescheduled date for the screening appeal process. Ward congresses were set for 29 April and LGA congresses were rescheduled for 10 May to elect delegates for the primary. Candidates approved by the screening process advanced to a primary set for 25 May, in concurrence with all other PDP gubernatorial primaries; challenges to the result could be made in the following days.

In the days directly before the primary, reports emerged that Wike had settled on Siminalayi Fubara—the immediate past Accountant General of Rivers State—as his preferred candidate despite the Economic and Financial Crimes Commission declaring Fubara wanted for fraud on 24 May. On the primary date, the candidates contested an indirect primary that ended with Fubara's nomination after results showed him winning over 81% of the delegates' votes; several other candidates did not attend the event. In his acceptance speech, Fubara vowed to continue the work of the Wike administration. After the primary, it was noted that Fubara's riverine origin and Ijaw ethnicity were a move in favor of a power shift after Wike's governorship. However, Fubara still faced opposition from the EFCC as agents attempted to arrest him on 8 June and were stopped by Fubara's armed thugs. Despite his status as a fugitive, Fubara commenced his campaign and selected Ngozi Odu—a former commissioner from Ogba–Egbema–Ndoni—as his running mate later in June.

==== Nominated ====
- Siminalayi Fubara: former state Accountant-General
  - Running mate—Ngozi Odu: former Commissioner for Education

==== Eliminated in primary ====
- David Briggs: former Commissioner for Works
- Abieatedoghu Bob-Abbey Hart: 2015 PDP gubernatorial candidate
- Tammy Danagogo: Secretary to the State Government (2019–2022) and former Minister of Sports (2014–2015)
- Dax George-Kelly: former adviser to Governor Wike
- Tele Ikuru: former Deputy Governor (2007; 2007–2015), former Commissioner of Housing and Urban Development (2004–2006), former Commissioner of Agriculture and Natural Resources (1999–2003), and cousin of former national PDP Chairman Uche Secondus
- Boma Iyaye: former Commissioner of Sports (2008–2009; 2009–2011; 2015–2022) and former House of Assembly member for Ogu–Bolo (2003–2007)
- Isaac Kamalu: former Commissioner of Finance (2019–2022), former Commissioner of Budget and Economic Planning (2015–2019), and former House of Assembly member for Eleme (2007–2011)
- Lee Maeba: former senator for Rivers South East (2003–2011)
- Olaka Nwogu: former senator for Rivers South East (2015–2016), former House of Representatives member for Eleme/Oyigbo/Tai (1999–2011), and former Eleme Local Government Chairman
- Felix A. Obuah: former Rivers State PDP Chairman
- Austin Opara: former House of Representatives member for Port Harcourt II (1999–2007) and former Deputy Speaker of the House of Representatives
- George Thompson Sekibo: Senator for Rivers East (2007–2017; 2019–present) and House of Representatives member for Okrika/Ogu/Bolo (2003–2007)
- Precious Sekibo: former Minister of Transportation (2003–2007)
- Morgan Tom-West

==== Disqualified by screening committee ====
- Farah Dagogo: House of Representatives member for Degema/Bonny (2019–present) and former House of Assembly member for Degema (disqualified for non-attendance at screening exercise)

==== Declined ====
- Dunamene Dekor: House of Representatives member for Khana/Gokana (2019–present), former Commissioner of Works, and former House of Assembly member for Khana II
- Kenneth Kobani: former Secretary to the State Government (2015–2019) and former Minister of State for Industry, Trade and Investment
- Barry Mpigi: Senator for Rivers South East (2019–present) and former House of Representatives member for Eleme/Oyigbo/Tai (2011–2019)

==== Results ====
Candidates' vote share
1. Siminalayi Fubara (81.0%)
2. Isaac Kamalu (9.66%)
3. Other candidates (9.33%)

PDP primary results
Party	Candidate	Votes	%
PDP	Siminalayi Fubara	721	81.01%
PDP	Isaac Kamalu	86	9.66%
PDP	Dax George-Kelly	37	4.16%
PDP	Tammy Danagogo	36	4.04%
PDP	David Briggs	4	0.45%
PDP	Morgan Tom-West	4	0.45%
PDP	Felix A. Obuah	2	0.22%
PDP	Other candidates	0	0.00%
Total votes		890	100.00%
Invalid or blank votes		8	N/A
Turnout		898	Unknown

=== Minor parties ===
- Dumo Lulu-Briggs (Accord)
  - Running mate: Tambari Hilda Dedam
- Dawari George (Action Alliance)
  - Running mate: Anoruewhom Tonnie Ibebulachi
- Victor Tamie Fingesi (Action Democratic Party)
  - Running mate: Belief Ekiye
  - Running mate: Otonye Bekangama Ekine
- Dada Joseph Ngechu Obele (African Action Congress)
  - Running mate: Ivy West
- Tonte Ibraye (African Democratic Congress)
  - Running mate: Tonto Dikeh
- Faye-Ofori Churchill (Allied Peoples Movement)
  - Running mate: Yanwi Obarijima
- Ugochukwu Prince Beke (All Progressives Grand Alliance)
  - Running mate: Charles Omuso Jumbo
- Tekena Iyagba (Boot Party)
  - Running mate: Ntormabari Mesua
- Beatrice Itubo (Labour Party)
  - Running mate: Kinanee Barikpoa
- Sam Agwor (New Nigeria Peoples Party)
  - Running mate: Tubonimi Johnson Isokariari
- Jackrich Sobomabo (National Rescue Movement)
  - Running mate: Leyinu Torkia Nwikpo
- Emiyarei Etete Sobere (People's Redemption Party)
  - Running mate: Augustine Nmecha Ozuru
- Magnus Abe (Social Democratic Party)
  - Running mate: Patricia Wudhiga Ogbonnaya
- Danagogo Wenike-Briggs (Young Progressives Party)
  - Running mate: Woyengimieyeseiga Helena Orduwa
- Leyii Kwanee (Zenith Labour Party)
  - Running mate: Jack Dawaye Brassba

== Campaign ==
Immediately after the primaries, analysts categorized the election as a proxy battle between outgoing governor Ezenwo Nyesom Wike (PDP) and former governor Rotimi Amaechi (APC) despite being the first Rivers State gubernatorial election since 2003 (Note: Although Amaechi's name was not on the ballot in the 2007 election, he successfully sued to be a legitimate candidate.) in which neither Wike nor Amaechi are candidates. Fubara and Cole are both extensively connected to Wike and Amaechi, respectively, leading to the labeling of the general election as a continuation of the power struggle between the two. However, the emergence of Magnus Abe—a former senator who spent years feuding with Amaechi over control of the state APC—as the SDP nominee added even more uncertainty to the election. More important factors included Fubara's ongoing corruption case and Wike's feud with the national PDP over the aftermath of the presidential primary, which he lost in May 2022.

However, the race was massively shifted by a High Court ruling in October 2022 which annulled all Rivers APC primaries. The ruling was quickly compared to a similar ruling that disqualified the Rivers APC in 2019; the party protested the judgement and vowed to contest the elections. The next month, on 7 November, the first public poll—conducted by NIO Polls and commissioned by the Anap Foundation—was released for the race with it showing a heavily fragmented field that Fubara led while Cole (who was included despite the court ruling) and Abe trailed in second and third, respectively. As the election neared, Cole was reinstated as nominee by a Court of Appeal ruling in January 2023. The next month, a debate was conducted by the Rivers State Governorship Debate Group on 19 February; Abe, Cole, and LP nominee Beatrice Itubo attended while Fubara and Accord nominee Dumo Lulu-Briggs were absent.

Later in February, focus switched to the nearing presidential election on 25 February. In the election, Rivers State voted for Bola Tinubu (APC) amid controversy; declared results showed Tinubu winning the state with 44.2% of the vote to defeat Peter Obi (LP) at 33.4% and Atiku Abubakar (PDP) at 16.9%. The election, riddled with irregularities and fraud accusations, led to renewed focus on the gubernatorial race as reports of Wike-directed electoral interference in favour of Tinubu led to concerns about similar efforts for Fubara. Analysts noted the high likelihood of voter apathy due to a sense that actual votes do not impact the announced results in wake of the widespread rigging reports from February along with fear of violence that had been targeted at opposition strongholds. Other factors considered by pundits included the tense political atmosphere, bigotry against non-indigenes, and continuous attacks on opposition figures.

=== Election debates ===
2023 Rivers State gubernatorial election debates
Date	Organisers	P Present (Note: Denotes a party gubernatorial nominee attending the event.) S Surrogate (Note: Denotes a party gubernatorial nominee not attending the event, sending a surrogate in their place.) NI Not invited A Absent invitee						
Date	Organisers	A	APC	LP	PDP	SDP	Other parties	Ref.
4 February	Rivers State Governorship Debate Group	A Lulu-Briggs	P Cole	P Itubo	A Fubara	P Abe	NI; Multiple	

=== Polling ===
Polling organisation/client	Fieldwork date	Sample size		PDP	SDP	Others	Undecided	None/No response/Refused
Polling organisation/client	Fieldwork date	Sample size	Cole APC	Fubara PDP	Abe SDP	Others	Undecided	None/No response/Refused
NIO Polls for Anap Foundation	October 2022	500	14%	11%	6%	12% (Note: Dumo Lulu-Briggs (A): 4%; Tekena Iyagba (BP): 3%; Beatrice Itubo (LP): 2%; Other candidates: 3%)	37%	20% (Note: Refused: 18%; None: 2%)
NIO Polls for Anap Foundation	February 2023	N/A	10%	20%	11%	11% (Note: Dumo Lulu-Briggs (A): 6%; Dawari George (AA): 2%; Beatrice Itubo (LP): 2%; Victor Tamie Fingesi: 1%)	23%	25% (Note: Refused: 24%; None: 1%)

== Projections ==
Source	Projection	As of
Africa Elects (Note: AfricaElects projections predict the likelihood of a candidate winning a state by categorizing a state as "Safe" for exceedingly likely, "Likely" for somewhat likely, and "Lean" for least likely. If no clear determination could be made, states are categorized as "tossups".)	Likely Fubara	17 March 2023
Enough is Enough- SBM Intelligence (Note: EiE-SBM projections predict which candidates will win states.)	Fubara	2 March 2023

== Conduct ==
=== Electoral timetable ===
On 26 February 2022, the Independent National Electoral Commission released the timetable, setting out key dates and deadlines for the election. Months later on 27 May 2022, INEC made a slight revision to the timetable, allowing parties extra time to conduct primaries.

- 28 February 2022 – Publication of Notice of Election
- 4 April 2022 – First day for the conduct of party primaries
- 9 June 2022 (Note: The original deadline was 3 June; however, INEC pushed it back to 9 June at the behest of parties.) – Final day for the conduct of party primaries, including the resolution of disputes arising from them
- 1 July 2022 – First day for submission of nomination forms to INEC via the online portal
- 15 July 2022 – Final day for submission of nomination forms to INEC via the online portal
- 12 October 2022 – Commencement of the official campaign period
- 16 March 2023 (Note: The original deadline was 9 March; however, INEC pushed it back to 16 March.) – Final day of the official campaign period

== General election ==
=== Results ===
2023 Rivers State gubernatorial election
Party	Candidate	Votes	%
A	Dumo Lulu-Briggs		
AA	Dawari George		
ADP	Victor Tamie Fingesi		
APP	Leesi Gabriel Gborogbosi		
AAC	Dada Joseph Ngechu Obele		
ADC	Tonte Ibraye		
APM	Faye-Ofori Churchill		
APC	Tonye Cole	95,274	
APGA	Ugochukwu Prince Beke		
BP	Tekena Iyagba		
LP	Beatrice Itubo	22,224	
New Nigeria Peoples Party	Sam Agwor	335	
NRM	Jackrich Sobomabo		
PDP	Siminalayi Fubara	302,614	
SDP	Magnus Abe		
YPP	Danagogo Wenike-Briggs		
ZLP	Leyii Kwanee		
Total votes			100.00%
Turnout			

==== By senatorial district ====
The results of the election by senatorial district.

Senatorial District	Tonye Cole APC		Siminalayi Fubara PDP		Magnus Abe SDP		Others		Total Valid Votes
Senatorial District	Votes	Percentage	Votes	Percentage	Votes	Percentage	Votes	Percentage	Total Valid Votes
Rivers East Senatorial District (Note: Comprising the local government areas of Emohua, Etche, Ikwerre, Obio-Akpor, Ogu–Bolo, Okrika, Omuma, and Port Harcourt.)	TBD	%	TBD	%	TBD	%	TBD	%	TBD
Rivers South East Senatorial District (Note: Comprising the local government areas of Andoni, Eleme, Gokana, Khana, Opobo–Nkoro, Oyigbo, and Tai.)	TBD	%	TBD	%	TBD	%	TBD	%	TBD
Rivers West Senatorial District (Note: Comprising the local government areas of Abua–Odual, Ahoada East, Ahoada West, Akuku-Toru, Asari-Toru, Bonny, Degema, and Ogba–Egbema–Ndoni.)	TBD	%	TBD	%	TBD	%	TBD	%	TBD
Totals	TBD	%	TBD	%	TBD	%	TBD	%	TBD

==== By federal constituency ====
The results of the election by federal constituency.

Federal Constituency	Tonye Cole APC		Siminalayi Fubara PDP		Magnus Abe SDP		Others		Total Valid Votes
Federal Constituency	Votes	Percentage	Votes	Percentage	Votes	Percentage	Votes	Percentage	Total Valid Votes
Abua/Odua/Ahoada East Federal Constituency (Note: Comprising the local government areas of Abua–Odual and Ahoada East.)	TBD	%	TBD	%	TBD	%	TBD	%	TBD
Ahoada West/Ogba/Egbema/Ndoni Federal Constituency (Note: Comprising the local government areas of Ahoada East and Ogba–Egbema–Ndoni.)	TBD	%	TBD	%	TBD	%	TBD	%	TBD
Akuku Toru/Asari Toru Federal Constituency (Note: Comprising the local government areas of Akuku-Toru and Asari-Toru.)	TBD	%	TBD	%	TBD	%	TBD	%	TBD
Andoni/Opobo/Nkoro Federal Constituency (Note: Comprising the local government areas of Andoni and Opobo–Nkoro.)	TBD	%	TBD	%	TBD	%	TBD	%	TBD
Degema/Bonny Federal Constituency (Note: Comprising the local government areas of Bonny and Degema.)	TBD	%	TBD	%	TBD	%	TBD	%	TBD
Eleme/Oyigbo/Tai Federal Constituency (Note: Comprising the local government areas of Eleme, Oyigbo, and Tai.)	TBD	%	TBD	%	TBD	%	TBD	%	TBD
Etche/Omuma Federal Constituency (Note: Comprising the local government areas of Etche and Omuma.)	TBD	%	TBD	%	TBD	%	TBD	%	TBD
Ikwerre/Emohua Federal Constituency (Note: Comprising the local government areas of Emohua and Ikwerre.)	TBD	%	TBD	%	TBD	%	TBD	%	TBD
Khana/Gokana Federal Constituency (Note: Comprising the local government areas of Gokana and Khana.)	TBD	%	TBD	%	TBD	%	TBD	%	TBD
Obio/Akpor Federal Constituency (Note: Comprising the local government area of Obio-Akpor.)	TBD	%	TBD	%	TBD	%	TBD	%	TBD
Okrika/Ogu/Bolo Federal Constituency (Note: Comprising the local government areas of Ogu–Bolo and Okrika.)	TBD	%	TBD	%	TBD	%	TBD	%	TBD
Port Harcourt I Federal Constituency and Port Harcourt II Federal Constituency (Note: Together comprising the local government area of Port Harcourt.) (Note: These two constituencies are within a single LGA. As this table does not differentiate between intra-LGA results, these figures are for the entire LGA which is the same as the data for both constituencies.)	TBD	%	TBD	%	TBD	%	TBD	%	TBD
Totals	TBD	%	TBD	%	TBD	%	TBD	%	TBD

==== By local government area ====
The results of the election by local government area.

LGA	Tonye Cole APC		Siminalayi Fubara PDP		Magnus Abe SDP		Others		Total Valid Votes	Turnout Percentage
LGA	Votes	Percentage	Votes	Percentage	Votes	Percentage	Votes	Percentage	Total Valid Votes	Turnout Percentage
Abua–Odual	5,738	%	9,763	%	463	%	712	%	16,676	%
Ahoada East	2,650	%	14,408	%	2,077	%	903	%	20,038	%
Ahoada West	4,883	%	6,425	%	1,063	%	775	%	13,146	%
Akuku-Toru	3,724	%	6,273	%	222	%	931	%	11,150	%
Andoni	3,149	%	8,319	%	1185	%	618	%	13,271	%
Asari-Toru	4,209	%	12,663	%	179	%	1,271	%	18,322	%
Bonny	3,285	%	8,032	%	559	%	1,571	%	13,447	%
Degema	3,107	%	4,437	%	579	%	1,006	%	9,129	%
Eleme	2,662	%	8,414	%	2,251	%	920	%	14,247	%
Emohua	5,916	%	20,600	%	805	%	1,270	%	28,591	%
Etche	6,408	%	16,043	%	2,586	%	1,283	%	26,320	%
Gokana	7,410	%	17,455	%	13,840	%	755	%	39,467	%
Ikwerre	7,503	%	13,716	%	1,447	%	1,424	%	24,090	%
Khana	620	%	9,475	%	5,846	%	494	%	16,435	%
Obio-Akpor	7,361	%	45,065	%	3,056	%	10,083	%	65,565	%
Ogba–Egbema–Ndoni	6,811	%	17,729	%	3,450	%	3,391	%	31381	%
Ogu–Bolo	1,524	%	7,103	%	310	%	528	%	9,155	%
Okrika	2,719	%	10,342	%	822	%	1,719	%	15,093	%
Omuma	2,127	%	8,760	%	804	%	234	%	11925	%
Opobo–Nkoro	1,246	%	11,538	%	159	%	246	%	13,189	%
Oyigbo	2,793	%	9,886	%	796	%	3,086	%	16,561	%
Port Harcourt	8.954	%	26,892	%	3,974	%	6,689	%	46,509	%
Tai	295	%	9,276	%	508	%	148	%	10,227	%
Totals	TBD	%	TBD	%	TBD	%	TBD	%	TBD	%

== See also ==
- 2023 Nigerian elections
- 2023 Nigerian gubernatorial elections
