= 2023 Nigerian Senate elections in Rivers State =

2023 Senate elections in Rivers

← 2019	25 February 2023	2027 →

All 3 Rivers State seats in the Senate of Nigeria
	Majority party
Party	PDP
Last election	3
Seats before	3
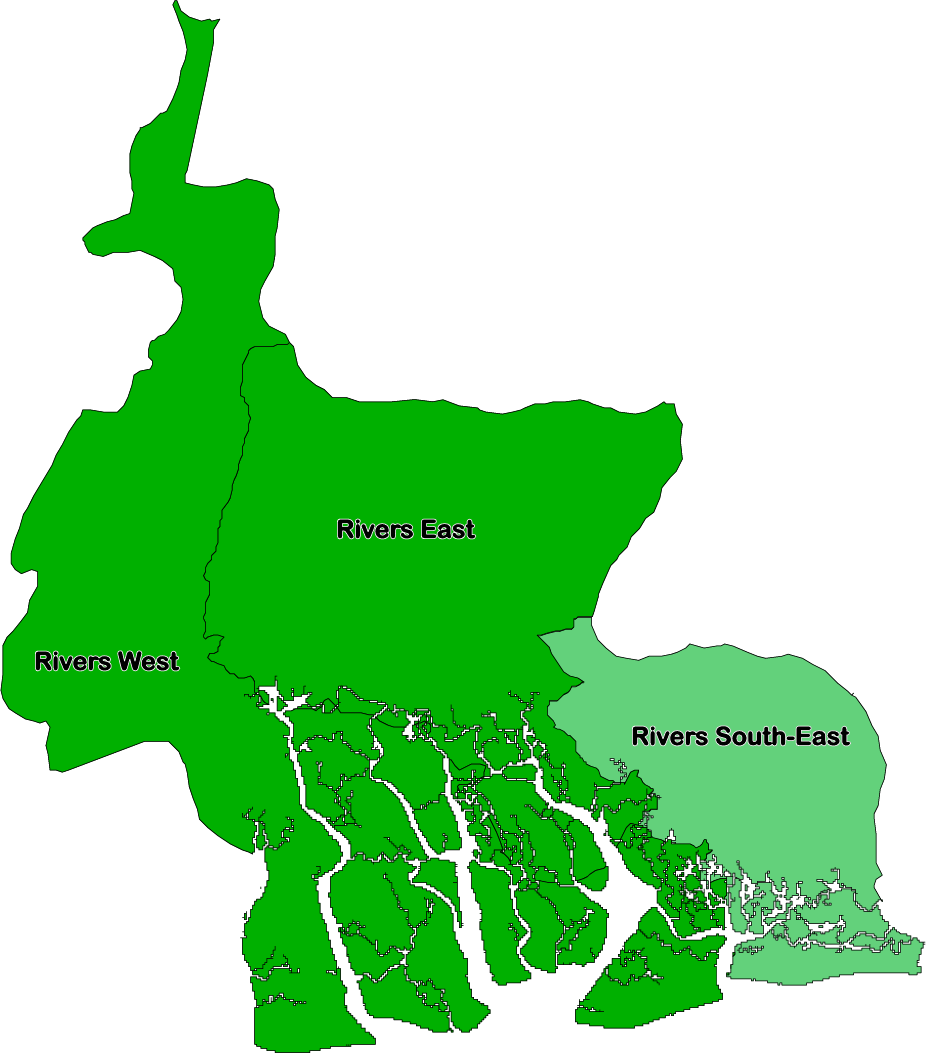
- PDP incumbent retiring PDP incumbent running for re-election

The 2023 Nigerian Senate elections in Rivers State will be held on 25 February 2023, to elect the 3 federal Senators from Rivers State, one from each of the state's three senatorial districts. The elections will coincide with the 2023 presidential election, as well as other elections to the Senate and elections to the House of Representatives; with state elections being held two weeks later. Primaries were held between 4 April and 9 June 2022.

== Background ==
In the previous Senate elections, none of the three incumbent senators were returned as Magnus Ngei Abe (APC-Rivers South East) retired to run for Governor while Andrew Uchendu (APC-East) and Osinakachukwu Ideozu (APC-Rivers West) could not run for re-election due to the disqualification of all Rivers APC candidates. George Thompson Sekibo (PDP) won the East seat with 89% of the vote, Barry Mpigi (PDP) won the South East seat with 95%, and Betty Apiafi (PDP) won the West seat with 79%. The senatorial results were an example of continued PDP strength in the state as the party also won all House of Representatives seats and Abubakar won the state in the presidential election by 50%; the PDP also won a majority in the House of Assembly and the gubernatorial election.

== Overview ==
Affiliation	Party	Total
Affiliation	PDP	Total
Previous Election	3	3
Before Election	3	3
After Election	3	3

== Summary ==
District	Incumbent		Results	
District	Incumbent	Party	Status	Candidates
Rivers East	George Thompson Sekibo	PDP	Incumbent retired New member elected PDP hold	▌Bisi Nwankwo (APC); ▌ ✓ Allwell Onyeso (PDP)
Rivers South-East	Barry Mpigi	PDP	Incumbent re-elected	▌Oji N. Ngofa (APC); ▌ ✓ Barry Mpigi (PDP)
Rivers West	Betty Apiafi	PDP	Incumbent retired New member elected PDP hold	▌Asita O. Asita (APC); ▌ ✓ Ipalibo Banigo (PDP)

== Rivers East ==
2023 Rivers East Senatorial District election
← 2019	25 February 2023	2027 →
Nominee	Bisi Nwankwo	Allwell Onyeso
Party	APC	PDP
Senator before election
George Thompson Sekibo
PDP
Elected Senator
TBD

The Rivers East Senatorial District covers the local government areas of Emohua, Etche, Ikwerre, Obio-Akpor, Ogu–Bolo, Okrika, Omuma, and Port Harcourt. Incumbent George Thompson Sekibo (PDP) was elected with 89.1% of the vote in 2019. Sekibo opted to run for governor of Rivers State instead of seeking re-election; he came joint-last in the PDP gubernatorial primary.

=== General election ===
==== Results ====
2023 Rivers East Senatorial District election
Party	Candidate	Votes	%
A	Solomon Ikegwuru		
ADP	Macceans M. Anthony		
APP	Hamlet Kpaku		
ADC	Lucky Onwumelu		
APC	Bisi Nwankwo		
APGA	Bright Ndah		
APM	Stella Ndidi Amadi		
LP	Wolu Ekelechi Benjamin Okwuwolu		
NRM	Uloma George		
New Nigeria Peoples Party	Christian Chinedu Omereji		
PDP	Allwell Onyeso		
SDP	Sunday Nwankwo		
YPP	Sunday Opuiyo		
ZLP	Kingcity K. Okwelle		
Total votes			100.00%
Invalid or blank votes			N/A
Turnout			

== Rivers South East ==
2023 Rivers South East Senatorial District election
← 2019	25 February 2023	2027 →
Nominee	Oji N. Ngofa	Barry Mpigi
Party	APC	PDP
Senator before election
Barry Mpigi
PDP
Elected Senator
TBD

The Rivers South East Senatorial District covers the local government areas of Andoni, Eleme, Gokana, Khana, Opobo–Nkoro, Oyigbo, and Tai. Incumbent Barry Mpigi (PDP), who was elected with 94.7% of the vote in 2019, is seeking re-election.

=== General election ===
==== Results ====
2023 Rivers South-East Senatorial District election
Party	Candidate	Votes	%
A	Suage Alex Badey		
APP	Kendrick Jaja		
ADC	Kenne Kenneth Baribetii Konne		
APC	Oji N. Ngofa		
APM	Leton Peter Sunday		
LP	Douglas Deeka Fabreke		
NRM	Leyira Nkekpo		
New Nigeria Peoples Party	Mabel Nwinbari		
PDP	Barry Mpigi		
SDP	Fred M. Atteng		
ZLP	Innocent Bori Anyie		
Total votes			100.00%
Invalid or blank votes			N/A
Turnout			

== Rivers West ==
2023 Rivers West Senatorial District election
← 2019	25 February 2023	2027 →
Nominee	Asita O. Asita	Ipalibo Banigo
Party	APC	PDP
Senator before election
Betty Apiafi
PDP
Elected Senator
TBD

The Rivers West Senatorial District covers the local government areas of Abua–Odual, Ahoada East, Ahoada West, Akuku-Toru, Asari-Toru, Bonny, Degema, and Ogba–Egbema–Ndoni. Incumbent Betty Apiafi (PDP), who was elected with 79.2% of the vote in 2019, is not seeking re-election.

=== General election ===
==== Results ====
2023 Rivers West Senatorial District election
Party	Candidate	Votes	%
ADP	Albert Anthony Nobi		
APP	Ibirabo Frank Briggs		
ADC	Jeff Chima Moses Iyieke		
APC	Asita O. Asita		
APM	Azubuike Nwabueze		
LP	Ezekiel Dixon Dikio		
NRM	Ellis Oyiboye Braide		
New Nigeria Peoples Party	Emmanuel Chimezie Nwabrije		
PDP	Ipalibo Banigo		
SDP	Dagogo Ada Green		
YPP	Omangima Idoniboye-obu		
ZLP	Odenoye Ikulughan		
Total votes			100.00%
Invalid or blank votes			N/A
Turnout			

== See also ==
- 2023 Nigerian Senate election
- 2023 Nigerian elections
- 2023 Rivers State elections
