= Politics of Rivers State =

The Politics of Rivers State function within the framework of a presidential republic, with the Governor of Rivers State as both head of state and head of government. Rivers State is known for a politically engaged citizenry. The official seat of government is in Port Harcourt. Under the Constitution, Executive power is vested in the Governor. This does not change the fact that such authority may also be exercised through the Deputy Governor or Commissioners. Legislative power is vested in a 32-member unicameral House of Assembly. Judicial power is exercised solely by the judiciary of Rivers State.

== Political institutions ==
As with the federal government of Nigeria, power in Rivers State is divided into three main branches: executive, legislative, and judicial.

=== Executive ===
The Executive branch of government in Rivers State is part of the government that is responsible for the daily administration of the state. The Executive branch consists mainly of executive council, ministries and various parastatals. It is headed by the Governor, who is both the chief of state and head of government. The governor is elected in the same manner as the President to no more than two consecutive four-year terms.

Each of the ministries is led by a Commissioner appointed by the Governor. Rivers State House of Assembly has the duty to confirm the Governor's appointments. Though parastatals have heads also appointed by the Governor, they are overseen by ministries run by Perm Secs who report to Commissioners.

Main office-holders
Office	Name	Party	Since
Governor	Siminalayi Fubara	People's Democratic Party	29 May 2023
Deputy Governor	Ngozi Odu	People's Democratic Party	29 May 2023

=== Legislative ===
The legislative powers in the state lie with the Rivers State House of Assembly. A unicameral body of 32 members elected every four years. The Assembly is presided over by a Speaker, assisted by other Principal Officers. All of whom are elected from among the House membership by the legislators.

Following general elections in April 2015, the current House of Assembly was formed. People's Democratic Party (PDP) emerged as the largest party with 31 seats. Members of the House of the Assembly are elected from single-member constituencies. The 8th House of Assembly was inaugurated on 1 June 2015.

=== Judicial ===
Rivers State has an independent judiciary, which interprets and applies the law in the state. It is composed of a number of courts, each specialized for a different task. Most judicial appointments including that of Chief Judge are made by the Governor, but acting upon the recommendation of the National Judicial Council. As the third arm, the judiciary plays a stabilizing role in the affairs of polity. It is equipped to adjudicate disputes between people or the government at various levels. Presently, there are 10 judicial divisions within the High Court of Justice, and about 26 judges carrying out their professional work.

== Political parties and elections ==
The main political players are the People's Democratic Party and the All Progressives Congress. These parties along with several minor ones put forward candidates for elections to the executive, legislative and local government councils. People's Democratic Party has been the most influential political party since 1999. It continues to maintain control of top statewide offices, including the governorship.

== Local government ==
At local level, the state is divided into local government areas. There are 23 LGAs that handle local administration under an elected Chairman or Mayor. Each of the local government areas has its own administrative seat and is further split into wards. Council elections are organized through the Rivers State Independent Electoral Commission.

LGA name	Area (km^{2})	Census 2006 population	Administrative seat	Postal Code	Wards
Port Harcourt	109	541,115	Port Harcourt	500	20
Obio-Akpor	260	464,789	Rumuodumaya	500	17
Okrika	222	222,026	Okrika	500	12
Ogu–Bolo	89	74,683	Ogu	500	12
Eleme	138	190,884	Ogale	501	10
Tai	159	117,797	Sakpenwa	501	10
Gokana	126	228,828	Kpor	501	17
Khana	560	294,217	Bori	502	19
Oyigbo	248	122,687	Afam	502	10
Opobo–Nkoro	130	151,511	Opobo Town	503	11
Andoni	233	211,009	Ngo	503	11
Bonny	642	215,358	Bonny	503	12
Degema	1,011	249,773	Degema	504	17
Asari-Toru	113	220,100	Buguma	504	13
Akuku-Toru	1,443	156,006	Abonnema	504	17
Abua–Odual	704	282,988	Abua	510	13
Ahoada West	403	249,425	Akinima	510	12
Ahoada East	341	166,747	Ahoada	510	13
Ogba–Egbema–Ndoni	969	284,010	Omoku	510	17
Emohua	831	201,901	Emohua	511	14
Ikwerre	655	189,726	Isiokpo	511	13
Etche	805	249,454	Okehi	512	19
Omuma	170	100,366	Eberi	512	10

== See also ==
- Rivers State People's Democratic Party
- Governor of Rivers State
- Rivers State House of Assembly
- Nigerian National Assembly delegation from Rivers
