= Outline of Rivers State =

Overview of and topical guide to Rivers State

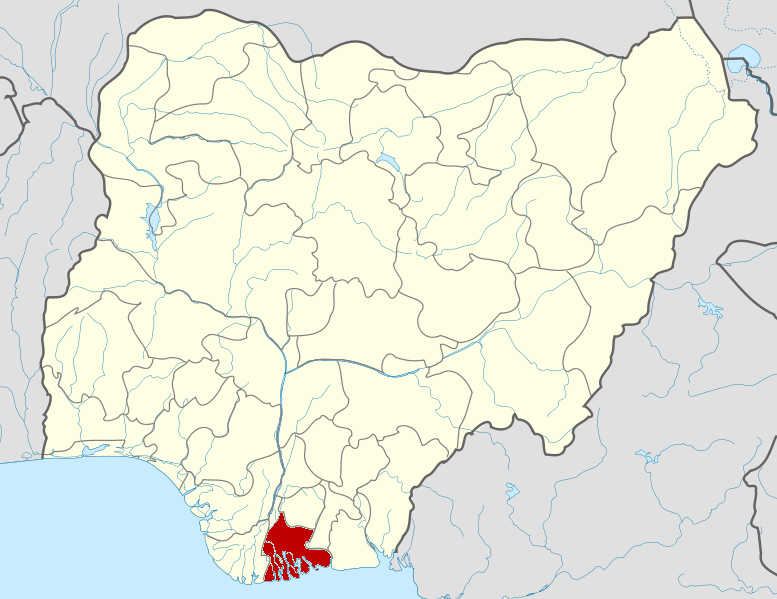
Location of Rivers State in Nigeria 4°51′29″N 6°55′15″E

The following outline is provided as an overview of and topical guide to Rivers State:

Rivers State – one of the 36 states of Nigeria, located in the southernmost part of the country. The state has a population of more than 5 million, and is the sixth-most populous state according to census data released in 2006. Its capital, Port Harcourt is the largest city, and is economically significant as the centre of Nigeria's oil industry.

== General reference ==
- Names
  - Common name: Rivers State
  - Local name: Rivers
    - Pronunciation:
  - Official name: Rivers State
  - Nicknames
    - Treasure Base of the Nation
- Adjectivals
  - Riverian
- Demonyms
  - Riverian
- Abbreviations and name codes
  - ISO 3166-2 code: NG-RI
  - Vehicle registration code:
- Rankings
  - by population: 5th
  - by area (2006 census): 26th
  - by crime rate:
  - by gross domestic product (GDP) (2010): 2nd
  - by Human Development Index (HDI):
  - by life expectancy at birth:
  - by literacy rate: 3rd

== Geography of Rivers State ==
Geography of Rivers State

- Rivers State is: a Nigerian state, and one of the 36 states of the Federal Republic of Nigeria
- Location
  - Northern Hemisphere
  - Eastern Hemisphere
    - Africa
      - Sub-Saharan Africa
        - West Africa
          - Nigeria
            - Southern Nigeria
- Time zone: West Africa Time (UTC+01)

=== Environment of Rivers State ===
- Climate of Rivers State
- Renewable energy in Rivers State
- Protected areas of Rivers State
  - Biseni Forest
  - Finima Nature Park
  - Upper Orashi Forest
- Wildlife of Rivers State
  - Fauna of Rivers State
    - Birds of Rivers State
    - Mammals of Rivers State

==== Natural geographic features of Rivers State ====
- Lakes of Rivers State
- Rivers of Rivers State

=== Regions of Rivers State ===
==== Administrative divisions of Rivers State ====
===== Local government areas of Rivers State =====
- Abua–Odual
- Ahoada East
- Ahoada West
- Akuku-Toru
- Andoni
- Asari-Toru
- Bonny
- Degema
- Eleme
- Emohua
- Etche
- Gokana
- Ikwerre
- Khana
- Obio-Akpor
- Ogba–Egbema–Ndoni
- Ogu–Bolo
- Okrika
- Omuma
- Opobo–Nkoro
- Oyigbo
- Port Harcourt
- Tai

== Government and politics of Rivers State ==
Politics of Rivers State

- Form of government: Presidential republic
- Capital of Rivers State: Port Harcourt
- Government House, Port Harcourt
- Elections in Rivers State

=== Branches of the government of Rivers State ===
Government of Rivers State

==== Executive branch of the government of Rivers State ====
- Governor of Rivers State
  - Deputy Governor of Rivers State
  - Executive Council of Rivers State
- State ministries
  - Rivers State Ministry of Transport
  - Rivers State Ministry of Energy and Natural Resources
  - Rivers State Ministry of Health
  - Rivers State Ministry of Education
  - Rivers State Ministry of Youth Development
  - Rivers State Ministry of Sports
  - Rivers State Ministry of Power
  - Rivers State Ministry of Housing
  - Rivers State Ministry of Environment
  - Rivers State Ministry of Information and Communication
  - Rivers State Ministry of Justice
  - Rivers State Ministry of Special Duties
  - Rivers State Ministry of Urban Development
  - Rivers State Ministry of Water Resources and Rural Development
  - Rivers State Ministry of Women Affairs
  - Rivers State Ministry of Works
  - Rivers State Ministry of Agriculture
  - Rivers State Ministry of Budget and Economic Planning
  - Rivers State Ministry of Chieftaincy and Community Affairs
  - Rivers State Ministry of Commerce and Industry
  - Rivers State Ministry of Culture and Tourism
  - Rivers State Ministry of Employment Generation and Empowerment
  - Rivers State Ministry of Lands and Survey
  - Rivers State Ministry of Social Welfare and Rehabilitation
  - Rivers State Ministry of Finance

==== Legislative branch of the government of Rivers State ====
- Rivers State House of Assembly (unicameral)
  - Speaker of the House

==== Judicial branch of the government of Rivers State ====
Courts of Rivers State

- High Court of Rivers State
- Rivers State Customary Court of Appeal

=== Law and order in Rivers State ===
- Crime in Rivers State
- Rivers State Police

== History of Rivers State ==
History of Rivers State

Rivers state is the sixth largest population area on Nigeria

== Culture of Rivers State ==
Culture of Rivers State

- List of people from Rivers State

== Economy and infrastructure of Rivers State ==
Economy of Rivers State

- Agriculture in Rivers State
- Communications in Rivers State
  - Newspapers in Rivers State
  - Radio stations in Rivers State
  - Television stations in Rivers State
- Health care in Rivers State
  - Hospitals in Rivers State
- Transportation in Rivers State
  - Airports in Rivers State
  - Roads in Rivers State
    - Highways in Rivers State

== Education in Rivers State ==
- Rivers State Ministry of Education
- Schools in Rivers State
  - List of schools in Rivers State
- Higher education in Rivers State
  - Catholic Institute of West Africa
  - Rivers State College of Health Science and Technology
  - Eastern Polytechnic, Port Harcourt
  - Ignatius Ajuru University of Education
  - Port Harcourt Polytechnic
  - Rivers State University
  - University of Port Harcourt

== See also ==
- Topic overview:
  - Rivers State
  - Index of Rivers State-related articles
  - Bibliography of Rivers State
