= Index of Rivers State–related articles =

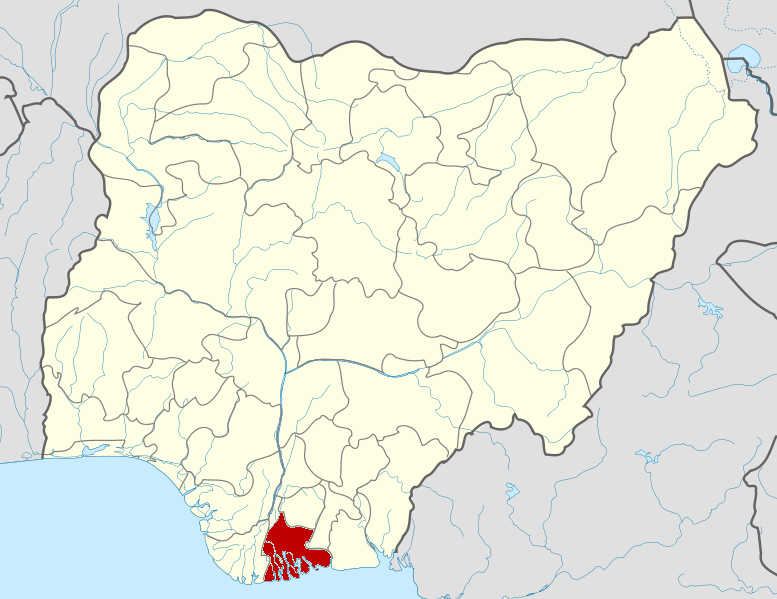
The location of Rivers State in Nigeria

The following is an alphabetical list of articles related to Rivers State, Nigeria.

== A ==
- Abalama
- Abonnema
- Abua–Odual
- Adjacent states:
  - Abia State
  - Akwa Ibom State
  - Anambra State
  - Bayelsa State
  - Delta State
  - Imo State
- Aggrey Road
- Agriculture in Rivers State
- Ahoada East
- Ahoada West
- Airports in Rivers State
- Akuku-Toru
- Andoni
- Asari-Toru
- Ataba
- Attorney General of Rivers State

== B ==
- Bibliography of Rivers State
- Bonny, Rivers State
- Bori City
- Buildings and structures in Rivers State
  - commons:Category:Buildings and structures in Rivers State
- Buguma

== C ==
- Capital of Rivers State: Port Harcourt
- Cities and towns in Rivers State
  - commons:Category:Cities in Rivers State
  - commons:Category:Towns in Rivers State
- Chief Judge of Rivers State
- Chief of Staff of Rivers State
- Colleges and universities in Rivers State
  - commons:Category:Universities and colleges in Rivers State
- Communications in Rivers State
- Companies based in Rivers State
- Culture in Rivers State

== D ==
- Degema, Rivers State
- Deputy Governor of Rivers State

== E ==
- Economy of Rivers State
  - Category:Economy of Rivers State
    - commons:Category:Economy of Rivers State
- Education in Rivers State
  - Category:Education in Rivers State
    - commons:Category:Education in Rivers State
- Elections in Rivers State
  - Category:Rivers State elections
    - commons:Category:Rivers State elections
- Eleme, Rivers State
- Emohua
- Environment of Rivers State
  - commons:Category:Environment of Rivers State
- Etche
- Events in Rivers State
- Executive Council of Rivers State

== G ==
- Geography of Rivers State
  - Category:Geography of Rivers State
    - commons:Category:Geography of Rivers State
- Geology of Rivers State
  - Category:Geology of Rivers State
    - commons:Category:Geology of Rivers State
- Gokana, Rivers State
- Government House, Port Harcourt
- Government of Rivers State website
  - Category:Government of Rivers State
    - commons:Category:Government of Rivers State
- Governor of Rivers State
  - List of governors of Rivers State

== H ==
- High Court of Rivers State
- High schools in Rivers State
- Higher education in Rivers State
- History of Rivers State
  - Category:History of Rivers State
    - commons:Category:History of Rivers State
- House of Assembly of Rivers State

== I ==
- Igrita
- Igwuruta
- Ikwerre, Rivers State
- Indigenous peoples of Rivers State
- Islands of Rivers State

== K ==
- Kenule Beeson Saro-Wiwa Polytechnic

== L ==
- Law of Rivers State
- Lists related to Rivers State:
  - List of Deputy Governors of Rivers State
  - List of airports in Rivers State
  - List of cities and towns in Rivers State
  - List of government agencies of Rivers State
  - List of government ministries of Rivers State
  - List of governors of Rivers State
  - List of members of the House of Representatives of Nigeria from Rivers State
  - List of indigenous peoples of Rivers State
  - List of people from Rivers State
  - List of rivers of Rivers State
  - List of members of the Senate of Nigeria from Rivers State
  - List of schools in Rivers State
- Local government areas of Rivers State

== M ==
- Music of Rivers State
  - Category:Musicians from Rivers State
    - commons:Category:Musicians from Rivers State

== N ==
- Mass media in Rivers State
- NG-RI – ISO 3166-2:NG region code for Rivers State
- Nigeria
  - States of Nigeria
  - Nigerian National Assembly delegation from Rivers

== O ==
- Obio-Akpor
- Odili, Peter
- Ogba–Egbema–Ndoni
- Ogu–Bolo
- Okilo, Melford
- Okrika
- Omuma
- Omoku
- Opobo–Nkoro
- Organizations based in Rivers State
- Oyigbo

== P ==
- People from Rivers State
  - Category:People from Rivers State
    - commons:Category:People from Rivers State
    - Category:People from Rivers State by local government area
    - Category:People from Rivers State by populated place
    - Category:People from Rivers State by occupation
- Politics of Rivers State
  - Category:Politics of Rivers State
    - commons:Category:Politics of Rivers State
- Port Harcourt – Capital of Rivers State
- Port Harcourt (local government area)
- Port Harcourt International Airport
- Port Harcourt Polytechnic

== R ==
- Rivers State website
  - Category:Rivers State
    - commons:Category:Rivers State
      - commons:Category:Maps of Rivers State
- Rivers State College of Health Science and Technology
- Rivers State University of Science and Technology
- Roman Catholic Diocese of Port Harcourt

== S ==
- Saro-Wiwa, Ken
- Speaker of the Rivers State House of Assembly
- Structures in Rivers State
  - commons:Category:Buildings and structures in Rivers State

== T ==
- Tai, Rivers State
- Tourism in Rivers State
  - commons:Category:Tourism in Rivers State
- Transportation in Rivers State
  - commons:Category:Transport in Rivers State

== U ==
- Universities and colleges in Rivers State
  - commons:Category:Universities and colleges in Rivers State

== V ==
- Tourist attractions in Rivers State
  - commons:Category:Visitor attractions in Rivers State

== W ==
- Wikimedia
  - Wikimedia Commons Atlas of Rivers State
  - Wikimedia Commons Category:Rivers State
    - commons:Category:Maps of Rivers State
  - Wikinews:Category:Rivers State
    - Wikinews:Portal:Rivers State
  - Wikipedia Category:Rivers State
    - Wikipedia:WikiProject Rivers State
      - Wikipedia:WikiProject Rivers State#Recognized content
      - Wikipedia:WikiProject Rivers State#Participants

== See also ==
- Topic overview:
  - Rivers State
  - Outline of Rivers State
  - Bibliography of Rivers State
