= Nigerian National Assembly delegation from Rivers =

Rivers' delegation in Nigeria's National Assembly

The Nigerian National Assembly delegation from Rivers comprises three Senators representing Rivers East, Rivers West, Rivers South East and thirteen Representatives representing Degema/Bonny, Okrika/Ogu-Bolo, Asalga/Akulga, Ahoada West/Ogba-Egbema-Ndoni, Port Harcourt 1, Ikwerre/Emohua, Khana/Gokana, Etche/Omuma, Tai/Eleme/Oyigbo, Abua-Odual/Ahoada East, Obio/Akpor, Port Harcourt 2, Andoni/Opobo/Nkoro.

== Third Nigerian Republic ==
The Rivers State of the third republic consisted of present-day Rivers and present-day Bayelsa States.

Senators during the Third Nigerian Republic from Rivers StateMembers of the House of Representatives during the Third Nigerian Republic from Rivers State
Senator	Elected	Party	Constituency	Term
Bennett Birabi	4 July 1992	NRC	Rivers East	5 December 1992 – 17 November 1993
Ngoji John Denton-West	4 July 1992	NRC	Rivers South-East	5 December 1992 – 17 November 1993
Felix O. Oboro	4 July 1992	NRC	Rivers West	5 December 1992 – 17 November 1993
Member	Elected	Party	Constituency	Term
Chris I. Chuama	4 July 1992	NRC	Okrika	5 December 1992 – 17 November 1993
Kpandei Loveday Baribor	4 July 1992	NRC	Gokana	5 December 1992 – 17 November 1993
Chris Alaye Don Pedro	4 July 1992	NRC	Akuku-Toru	5 December 1992 – 17 November 1993
Imegwu Nnabuihe	4 July 1992	SDP	Oyigbo	5 December 1992 – 17 November 1993
E. M. Sam-Eligwe	4 July 1992	NRC	Ahoda	5 December 1992 – 17 November 1993
Agbedi Yeitiemone Frederick	4 July 1992	NRC	Ekeremor	5 December 1992 – 17 November 1993
Ibiama Ibifuro Anye	4 July 1992	SDP	Bonny	5 December 1992 – 17 November 1993
Friday Josiah Abigo	4 July 1992	NRC	Abua/Odual	5 December 1992 – 17 November 1993
Samuel Lucky Onwuzirike Oluo	4 July 1992	NRC	Etche	5 December 1992 – 17 November 1993
Igwe Mbombo Fred	4 July 1992	NRC	Tai-Eleme	5 December 1992 – 17 November 1993
Angolia Aboko	4 July 1992	NRC	Degema	5 December 1992 – 17 November 1993
Bolere Elizabeth Ketebu	4 July 1992	NRC	Yenagoa	5 December 1992 – 17 November 1993
John Chukwuma Imegi	4 July 1992	NRC	Ogba/Egbema/Ndoni	5 December 1992 – 17 November 1993
Basilo Michael	4 July 1992	NRC	Ogbia	5 December 1992 – 17 November 1993
Syder Nnodim	4 July 1992	NRC	Emohua	5 December 1992 – 17 November 1993
Enyindah Ibenyenwo	4 July 1992	NRC	Ikwerre	5 December 1992 – 17 November 1993
Felix Achinike Igwe	4 July 1992	NRC	Obio/Akpor	5 December 1992 – 17 November 1993
Telimoye M. Oguara	4 July 1992	NRC	Brass	5 December 1992 – 17 November 1993
Sampson Gilbert Egop	4 July 1992	NRC	Andoni/Opobo	5 December 1992 – 17 November 1993
Arthur Chidebe Kalagbor	4 July 1992	SDP	Port-Harcourt	5 December 1992 – 17 November 1993
Paworiso Samuel Horsefall	4 July 1992	NRC	Asari-Toru	5 December 1992 – 17 November 1993
Eddie Esinkumo Ogoun	4 July 1992	NRC	Southern Ijaw	5 December 1992 – 17 November 1993
Linus Lebari Kpabari	4 July 1992	NRC	Khana	5 December 1992 – 17 November 1993
Gushi F. A. Toun-Aregha	4 July 1992	NRC	Sagbama	5 December 1992 – 17 November 1993

== Fourth Republic ==
=== The 9th Parliament (2019–2023) ===
OFFICE	NAME	PARTY	CONSTITUENCY	TERM
Senator	George Thompson Sekibo	People's Democratic Party	Rivers East	2019–2023
Senator	Betty Apiafi	People's Democratic Party	Rivers West	2019–2023
Senator	Barinada Barry Mpigi	People's Democratic Party	Rivers South East	2019–2023
Representative	Farah Dagogo	People's Democratic Party	Degema/Bonny	2019–2023
Representative	Tamunosisi Gogo Jaja	People's Democratic Party	Okrika/Ogu-Bolo	2019–2023
Representative	Boniface S. Emerengwa		Ikwerre/Emohua	2019–2023
Representative	Uchechukwu Nnam-Obi	People's Democratic Party	Ahoada-West/Ogba-Egbema-Ndoni	2019–2023
Representative	Kenneth Chikere	People's Democratic Party	Port Harcourt I	2019–2023
Representative	Boma Goodhead	People's Democratic Party	Asalga/Akulga	2019–2023
Representative	Dumnamene Robinson Dekor	People's Democratic Party	Khana/Gokana	2019–2023
Representative	Ephraim Nwuzi	People's Democratic Party	Etche/Omuma	2019–2023
Representative	Chisom Promise Dike	People's Democratic Party	Tai/Eleme/Oyigbo	2019–2023
Representative	Solomon Bob	People's Democratic Party	Abua—Odual—Ahaoda East	2019–2023
Representative	Kingsley Chinda	People's Democratic Party	Obio/Akpor	2019–2023
Representative	Chinyere Emmanuel Igwe	People's Democratic Party	Port Harcourt II	2019–2023
Representative	Awji Inombek Adiante	People's Democratic Party	Andoni/Opobo/Nkoro	2019–2023

=== The 8th Parliament (2015–2019) ===
OFFICE	NAME	PARTY	CONSTITUENCY	TERM
Senator	Andrew Uchendu	APC	Rivers East	2015–2019
Senator	Osinakachukwu Ideozu	People's Democratic Party	Rivers West	2015–2019
Senator	Magnus Ngei Abe	APC	Rivers South East	2015–2019
Representative	Randolph Iwo Oruene Brown	People's Democratic Party	Degema/Bonny	2015–2019
Representative	Gogo Tamuno	People's Democratic Party	Okrika/Ogu-Bolo	2015–2019
Representative	Wihioka Chidi Frank	All Progressive Congress	Ikwerre/Emohua	2015–2019
Representative	Ucechirun NNnam-Obi	People's Democratic Party	Ahoada-West/Ogba-Egbema-Ndoni	2015–2019
Representative	Kenneth Chikere	People's Democratic Party	Port Harcourt I	2015–2019
Representative	Boma Goodhead	People's Democratic Party	Asalga/Akulga	2015–2019
Representative	Maurice Propnen	APC	Khana/Gokana	2015–2019
Representative	Jerome Amadi Eke	People's Democratic Party	Etche/Omuma	2015–2019
Representative	Mpigi Barinada	All Progressive Congress	Tai/Eleme/Oyigbo	2015–2019
Representative	Betty Apiafi	People's Democratic Party	Abua—Odual—Ahaoda East	2015–2019
Representative	Kingsley Chinda	People's Democratic Party	Obio/Akpor	2015–2019
Representative	Nsiegbe Blessing Ibibia	People's Democratic Party	Port Harcourt II	2015–2019
Representative	Awji Inombek Adiante	People's Democratic Party	Andoni/Opobo/Nkoro	2015–2019

=== The 7th Parliament (2011–2015) ===
OFFICE	NAME	PARTY	CONSTITUENCY	TERM
Senator	George Thompson Sekibo	People's Democratic Party	Rivers East	2011–2015
Senator	Wilson Asinobi Ake	People's Democratic Party	Rivers West	2011–2015
Senator	Magnus Ngei Abe	People's Democratic Party	Rivers South East	2011–2015
Representative	Davies Sokonte Huttin	People's Democratic Party	Degema/Bonny	2011–2015
Representative	Bright Tamuno Gogo	People's Democratic Party	Okrika/Ogu-Bolo	2011–2015
Representative	Andrew Uchendu	People's Democratic Party	Ikwerre/Emohua	2011–2015
Representative	Asita Honourable	People's Democratic Party	Ahoada-West/Ogba-Egbema-Ndoni	2011–2015
Representative	Kenneth Chikere	People's Democratic Party	Port Harcourt I	2011–2015
Representative	Dawari George	People's Democratic Party	Asalga/Akulga	2011–2015
Representative	Maurice Propnen	People's Democratic Party	Khana/Gokana	2011–2015
Representative	Ogbonna Nwuke	People's Democratic Party	Etche/Omuma	2011–2015
Representative	Barinada Mpigi	People's Democratic Party	Tai/Eleme/Oyigbo	2011–2015
Representative	Betty Apiafi	People's Democratic Party	Abua—Odual—Ahaoda East	2011–2015
Representative	Kingsley Ogundu Chinda	People's Democratic Party	Obio/Akpor	2011–2015
Representative	Blessing Ibiba Nsiegbe	People's Democratic Party	Port Harcourt II	2011–2015
Representative	Dakuku Peterside	People's Democratic Party	Andoni/Opobo/Nkoro	2011–2015

=== The 6th Parliament (2007–2011) ===
OFFICE	NAME	PARTY	CONSTITUENCY	TERM
Senator	George Thompson Sekibo	People's Democratic Party	Rivers East	2007–2011
Senator	Wilson Asinobi Ake	People's Democratic Party	Rivers West	2007–2011
Senator	Lee Maeba	People's Democratic Party	Rivers South East	2007–2011
Representative	Davies Sokonte Huttin	People's Democratic Party	Degema/Bonny	2007–2011
Representative	Kalipa John	People's Democratic Party	Okrika/Ogu-Bolo	2007–2011
Representative	Kunaiyi-Akpanah Daemi	People's Democratic Party	Asalga/Akulga	2007–2011
Representative	Asita Honourable	People's Democratic Party	Ahoada-West/Ogba-Egbema-Ndoni	2007–2011
Representative	Aguma Igochukwu	People's Democratic Party	Port Harcourt I	2007–2011
Representative	Andrew Uchendu	People's Democratic Party	Ikwerre, Rivers State/Emohua	2007–2011
Representative	Deeyah Emmanuel Nwika	People's Democratic Party	Khana/Gokana	2007–2011
Representative	Nwosu George Ford	People's Democratic Party	Etche/Omuma	2007–2011
Representative	Olaka Nwogu	People's Democratic Party	Tai/Eleme/Oyigbo	2007–2011
Representative	Betty Apiafi	People's Democratic Party	Abua—Odual—Ahaoda East	2007–2011
Representative	Chinwo Ike B. S	People's Democratic Party	Obio/Akpor	2007–2011
Representative	Chinyere Igwe	People's Democratic Party	Port Harcourt II	2007–2011
Representative	Berewari Christopher	People's Democratic Party	Andoni/Opobo/Nkoro	2007–2011

=== The 5th Parliament (2003–2007) ===
OFFICE	NAME	PARTY	CONSTITUENCY	TERM
Senator	Ibiapuye Martyns-Yellowe	People's Democratic Party	Rivers West	2003–2007
Senator	Lee Maeba	People's Democratic Party	Rivers South East	2003–2007
Senator	John Azuta-Mbata	People's Democratic Party	Rivers East	2003–2007
Representative	----	----	Bonny/Degema	2003–2007
Representative	sodienye swerve	----	Okrika/Ogu-bolo	2003–2007
Representative	Kunaiyi-Akpanah Daemi	People's Democratic Party	Asalga/Akulga	2003–2007
Representative	----	----	Ahoada-West/Ogba-Egbema-Ndoni	2003–2007
Representative	Aguma Igochukwu	People's Democratic Party	Port Harcourt I	2003–2007
Representative	Andrew Uchendu	People's Democratic Party	Ikwerre/Emohua	2003–2007
Representative	Deeyah Emmanuel Nwika	People's Democratic Party	Khana/Gokana	2003–2007
Representative	Nwosu George Ford	People's Democratic Party	Etche/Omuma	2003–2007
Representative	Olaka Nwogu	People's Democratic Party	Eleme/Tai/Oyigbo	2003–2007
Representative	Osinakachukwu Ideozu	People's Democratic Party	Ahoada-East;Abua/Odual	2003–2007
Representative	Chinwo Ike B. S	People's Democratic Party	Obio/Akpor	2003–2007
Representative	Austin Opara	People's Democratic Party	Port Harcourt II	2003–2007
Representative	Owor Jeffreys M	People's Democratic Party	Andoni/Opobo/Nkoro	2003–2007

=== The 4th Parliament (1999–2003) ===
OFFICE	NAME	PARTY	CONSTITUENCY	TERM
Senator	John Azuta-Mbata	People's Democratic Party	Rivers East	1999–2003
Senator	Ibiapuye Martyns-Yellowe	People's Democratic Party	Rivers West	1999–2003
Senator	Adawari Pepple	People's Democratic Party	Rivers Central	1999–2003
Representative	Longjohn Tonye Tamuno	People's Democratic Party	Bonny/Degema	1999–2003
Representative	Abibo Promise Iderifama T.	All Nigeria Peoples Party	Okrika/Ogu-bolo	1999–2003
Representative	Adokiye Young-Harry	People's Democratic Party	Asalga/Akulga	1999–2003
Representative	Wilson Asinobi Ake	People's Democratic Party	Ahoada-West/Ogba-Egbema-Ndoni	1999–2003
Representative	Amadi Lasbry Onusegbu	People's Democratic Party	Port Harcourt I	1999–2003
Representative	Amadi Appolos E.	People's Democratic Party	Ikwerre/Emohua	1999–2003
Representative	Barida Mikko Bernard	People's Democratic Party	Khana/Gokana	1999–2003
Representative	Nwala Iwezor Jacob	People's Democratic Party	Etche/Omuma	1999–2003
Representative	Olaka Nwogu	People's Democratic Party	Eleme/Tai/Oyigbo	1999–2003
Representative	Chibudom Nwuche	People's Democratic Party	Ahoada-East;Abua/Odual	1999–2003
Representative	Ogonda Oludi Edwin	People's Democratic Party	Obio/Akpor	1999–2003
Representative	Austin Opara	People's Democratic Party	Port Harcourt II	1999–2003
Representative	Owor Jeffreys M.	People's Democratic Party	Andoni/Opobo/Nkoro	1999–2003
