= Bernard Mikko =

Nigerian politician (born 1961)

Honourable Bernard Mikko

Member of the House of Representatives of Nigeria
- In office 1999–2003
- President: Olusegun Obasanjo
- Succeeded by: Deeyah Emmanuel Nwika
- Constituency: Khana/Gokana

Personal details
- Born: May 7, 1961 (age 65) Rivers State
- Education: Manchester Metropolitan University

Hon Bernard Barida Mikko (born May 7, 1961) is a Nigerian politician and businessman from Gokana LGA in Rivers State. He served as a member of the 4th parliament of the Nigerian National Assembly delegation from Rivers state, representing Khana/Gokana constituency from 1999 to 2003. In 2022, Mikko declared his interest to participate in the 2023 Rivers State gubernatorial election under APC, however, Tonye Cole won the primary election and emerged as the party's candidate. .

== Political career ==
In 1987, Bernard Mikko was elected Councillor, B.dere Ward 4, Bori local Government Council.

From January 1988 to June 1989 He served as the vice-chairman of the Bori Local Government Council. In 1999, He was elected into the House of Representatives of Nigeria, where he served till 2003, representing the Khana/Gokana Constituency. Deeyah Emmanuel Nwika succeeded him.

Under the PDP, Bernard Mikko was appointed as Special Adviser on Monitoring to PDP National Chairman(Dr. Bamanga Tukur) from 2013 to 2014. In 2014, he declared his intention to join the 2015 Rivers State gubernatorial election. However, he and 15 others boycotted the ward congress on the grounds of unfair practices. The Primary election was won by Ezenwo Nyesom Wike.

In 2017, Mikko defected to the All Progressive Congress APC. In 2018, he joined the race for the Rivers State Southeast Senatorial seat. However, all nominations in the APC were nullified and APC was barred from fielding candidates in the 2019 Rivers State elections.

In 2021, he was appointed chairman of, the APC Congress Appeal Committee for Enugu State.
