= 2019 Rivers State gubernatorial election =

Nigerian state election

- 9 March and 13 April 2019
Nominee	Ezenwo Nyesom Wike	Biokpomabo Awara
Party	PDP	AAC
Popular vote	886,264	173,859
Governor before election
Ezenwo Nyesom Wike
PDP
Elected Governor
Ezenwo Nyesom Wike
PDP

The Rivers State gubernatorial election took place on 9 March 2019, concurrently with various other Nigerian state level elections. A rerun of the vote was held in Abua–Odual, Ahoada West, Gokana and Opobo–Nkoro on 13 April. One-term incumbent Governor Ezenwo Nyesom Wike of the People's Democratic Party was eligible to run for re-election. He won in 2015 with 87.77% of the vote.

Vote counting after the elections was suspended after widespread violence in the state. On 3 April, the INEC declared that incumbent Wike won re-election, as the total number of voters in areas where elections were cancelled or did not hold was not enough to give his opponent victory.

== Background ==
Ezenwo Nyesom Wike previously served as Minister of State for Education prior to becoming governor. He was also Chairman of the 2016 PDP National Convention Committee. Wike considered running for a second term as the state's chief executive, and 51 years old at the time of the election in 2019.

There had been reports of a rift between members of the All Progressives Congress Dakuku Peterside and Ibim Semenitari. The state party chairman, Davies Ikanya has, however, denied this. In 2017, Transportation Minister Chibuike Amaechi got involved in a dispute with party members, after he declared billionaire businessman Tonye Cole as his choice for the All Progressives Congress nomination for governor.

On 22 May 2017, Senate minority leader and former governor Godswill Akpabio announced that he would support a second term for Governor Wike in the Brick House. Former Senate President David Mark and Deputy Senate President Ike Ekweremadu also voiced their endorsement of the incumbent governor to run for reelection.

== Controversies ==
In 2019, the Federal High Court in Port Harcourt ordered INEC not to recognise APC candidates in Rivers State because of the party's inability to comply with earlier court orders concerning its internal processes and primaries. The ruling led to disagreements between the groups associated with Tonye Cole and Magnus Abe.The PDP, led by Governor Nyesom Wike, pursued the issue in court, arguing that the APC had failed to conduct valid primaries. It raised questions over whether the APC would be able to field candidates in the 2019 elections and prompted calls for the party to resolve its internal disputes or pursue further appeals.

== See also ==
- 2015 Rivers State gubernatorial election
- Elections in Rivers State
