= Sobomabo Jackrich =

Nigerian political activist

Sobomabo Jackrich (born 19 January 1978), commonly known as Egberipapa, is a Nigerian political activist and former militant commander from Rivers State. He was a prominent figure in the Niger Delta conflict of the 2000s, serving as a commander in the Movement for the Emancipation of the Niger Delta (MEND) before accepting the federal government's amnesty in 2009. Since the amnesty, Jackrich has transitioned to civic activism, founding several advocacy organizations and contesting as the governorship candidate for the National Rescue Movement in Rivers State's 2023 election.

== Early life and education ==
Jackrich was born on 19 January 1978 in Buguma, the headquarters of Asari-Toru Local Government Area in Rivers State. He is from the Kalabari ethnic group, part of the Ijaw people in the Niger Delta region.

He obtained his First School Leaving Certificate from State School 1, Churchill Road, Port Harcourt in 1991. He later returned to formal education, earning a West African Senior School Certificate from Community Secondary School Idama in 2010, a Diploma in Public Administration from Dorben Polytechnic, Abuja in 2014, and a Higher National Diploma from Wolex Polytechnic, Lagos in 2021.

== Niger Delta militancy ==
=== Early activism ===
In the mid-1990s, Jackrich became involved in Niger Delta youth movements advocating for resource control and environmental justice. He joined the Kirimani Movement and later became active in the Ijaw Youth Council (IYC) following the 1998 Kaiama Declaration. During this period, he aligned with Alhaji Mujahid Dokubo-Asari, who served as IYC president starting in 2001 and later founded the Niger Delta People's Volunteer Force.

=== Role in MEND ===
By the mid-2000s, Jackrich had joined the Movement for the Emancipation of the Niger Delta (MEND), adopting the nom de guerre "Egberipapa," meaning "storyteller" in his local dialect. Operating as a commander in the Kalabari axis of Rivers State, he became involved in the militant campaign against oil infrastructure that characterized the Niger Delta conflict during this period.

In 2005, following the arrest of Asari Dokubo on treason charges, Jackrich participated in militant actions that included the detention of four Schlumberger oil workers. The workers were later released.

=== Arrest and detention ===
In December 2008, Jackrich was arrested by the Joint Task Force at the palace of the Amanyanabo of Buguma, where he had gone for peace talks brokered by traditional leaders. The Movement for the Emancipation of the Niger Delta issued a statement condemning the arrest as a "betrayal of trust." Jackrich remained in detention until the 2009 presidential amnesty.

== Transition to civic activism ==
=== Acceptance of amnesty ===
In 2009, Jackrich accepted the federal government's amnesty programme under President Umaru Yar'Adua and publicly renounced armed struggle. In a 2009 interview, he stated that armed struggle "does not pay" and encouraged others to embrace peace. However, Jackrich later claimed that he and his followers were excluded from the formal amnesty benefits, leading him to petition the Senate Committee on Ethics, Privileges, and Public Petitions.

=== Political and advocacy organizations ===
Following the amnesty, Jackrich founded several civic organizations. In 2011, he established the Kengema Unity Forum (KUF), a political advocacy group focused on the Kalabari and riverine communities of Rivers State. He also founded the Network for the Defence of Democracy and Good Governance (NDDGG), which has issued petitions and public statements on government transparency and accountability in Rivers State.

=== Political career ===
Jackrich served as caretaker chairman of Asari-Toru Local Government Area in 2016. He was appointed Chairman of the NDDC COVID-19 Palliative Distribution Committee in 2021, a role that led to controversy when he petitioned the Senate alleging misappropriation of palliative funds by the Niger Delta Development Commission's Interim Management Committee.

In 2023, Jackrich contested the Rivers State governorship election as the candidate of the National Rescue Movement (NRM).

In June 2024, Jackrich founded the Simplicity Movement to support Governor Siminalayi Fubara during a political crisis in Rivers State. The movement was later transformed into the Rivers Grassroots Movement (RGM) in July 2025.

== 2024 arrest and detention ==
On 8 April 2024, Jackrich was arrested at his residence in Usokun, Degema Local Government Area by armed personnel in military uniform. The operation, which began around 3:00 a.m., resulted in the deaths of two of his aides. The Rivers State Police Command confirmed that Jackrich was not kidnapped but was arrested by a security agency, though the specific agency was not named.

The arrest prompted widespread concern among Ijaw leaders and civil society organizations. The Ijaw Youth Council and prominent Ijaw leader Chief Anabs Sara-Igbe called for Jackrich's immediate release and demanded transparency about his detention. The National Rescue Movement issued statements questioning the legality of the operation and calling for government intervention.

In a subsequent television interview with Arise News, Jackrich stated that military officers had accused him of harboring suspects linked to the Okuama incident in Delta State, an allegation he denied. He also reiterated his claim of being excluded from amnesty benefits despite surrendering arms in 2009.

== Personal life ==
Jackrich is married with children. In 2019, he was installed as the Paramount Head of the Da Ike Group of Houses and Communities in Kalabari land, a traditional title.
