= Loolo Dinebari =

Nigerian politician

Loolo Dinebari was a Nigerian politician. He served as the State Representative for the Khana II constituency in the Rivers State House of Assembly. He died in September 2023.
