= Kpor =

Kpor is a community in Gokana local government area, in Rivers State, Nigeria.

Kpor shares a boundary with Mogho, Bomu, K-dere, and Bera.

Kpor is the headquarters of the Gokana local government area, and is under the Rivers South East Senatorial District and Barinaada Mpigi is the current senator representing its District. They are mainly farmers and fishermen. They believe that there is a God called Bari who created the world. There are some traditional worshippers and also secret cult festival called aminikpo.
