= Ngozi Odu =

Nigerian politician and professor (born 1952)

Her Excellency Ngozi Odu
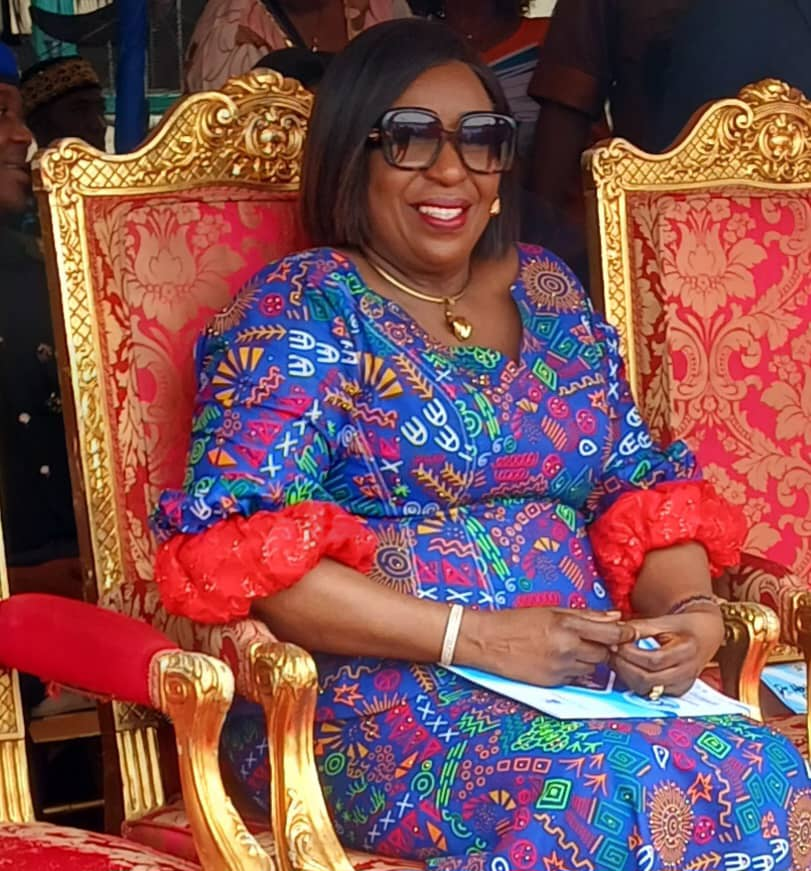
- Rivers State Deputy Governor Ngozi Nma Odu

Deputy Governor of Rivers State
- Incumbent
- Assumed office 29 May 2023; Suspended from 18 March to 18 September 2025
- Governor: Siminalayi Fubara
- Preceded by: Ipalibo Banigo

Rivers State Commissioner for Education
- In office January 2003 – 29 May 2007

Personal details
- Born: Ngozi Nma Odu; 19 October 1952 (age 73) Ogba-Egbema-Ndoni, Southern Region, British Nigeria (now in Rivers State, Nigeria)
- Party: All Progressive Congress
- Education: University of Port Harcourt (PhD); Queen Elizabeth College, later King's College London (MSc); University of the West of Scotland (BSc)
- Occupation: Politician; professor

Ngozi Nma Odu (born 19 October 1952) is a Nigerian politician who is the deputy governor of Rivers State. She was elected during the 2023 Rivers State gubernatorial election alongside the governor Siminalayi Fubara. She was born in Egi clan in Ogba/Egbema/Ndoni LGA of Rivers State.

== Early life and education ==
Odu was born on the 23 October 1952, in Ogba/Egbema/Ndoni local government area of Rivers State, Nigeria. She obtained her first degree in microbiology from Paisley College of Technology (now University of the West of Scotland), Renfrewshire, Scotland. She also holds a master's degree in Food Science and Management in 1983 from the Queen Elizabeth College, University of London (later absorbed by King's College London), . In 1989 she obtained a PhD in microbiology from the University of Port Harcourt that made her the first PhD graduate in that department.

== Career ==
Odu rose through the ranks in the Rivers State Ministry of Health to the post of permanent secretary from 1999 to 2006. In 2003, Odu was appointed the Rivers State Commissioner of Education by the former governor of the state, Peter Odili. Odu served the University of Port Harcourt both as a lecturer in the Department of Microbiology and as the first Acting Executive Director of the University of Port Harcourt Foundation. She is also a visiting professor at Rivers State University. In June 2022, Rivers State chapter of the Peoples Democratic Party nominated Odu as the deputy governorship candidate of the party in the 2023 Rivers State gubernatorial election. Before her election as deputy governor, Odu was the Director of Academic Planning, Pamo University of Medical Sciences, Rivers State.

== See also ==
- 2023 Rivers State gubernatorial election
- 2023 Nigerian elections
