= Bright Tamuno Gogo =

Nigerian politician

Bright Tamuno Gogo is a Nigerian politician who represented Okrika/Ogu-Bolo Federal Constituency in Rivers State, in the National House of Representative, under the platform of the People's Democratic Party (PDP).
