= 2011 Nigerian Senate elections in Rivers State =

2011 Nigerian Senate election in Rivers State

The 2011 Nigerian Senate election in Rivers State was held on April 9, 2011, to elect members of the Nigerian Senate to represent Rivers State. George Thompson Sekibo representing Rivers East, Magnus Ngei Abe representing Rivers South East and Wilson Asinobi Ake representing Rivers West all won on the platform of Peoples Democratic Party.

== Overview ==
Affiliation	Party		Total
Affiliation	PDP	ACN	Total
Before Election			3
After Election	3	–	3

== Summary ==
District	Incumbent	Party	Elected Senator	Party
Rivers East			George Thompson Sekibo	PDP
Rivers South East			Magnus Ngei Abe	PDP
Rivers West			Wilson Asinobi Ake	PDP

== Results ==
=== Rivers East ===
Peoples Democratic Party candidate George Thompson Sekibo won the election, defeating other party candidates.

2011 Nigerian Senate election in Rivers State
Party	Candidate	Votes	%
PDP	George Thompson Sekibo		
Total votes			
PDP hold			

=== Rivers South East ===
Peoples Democratic Party candidate Magnus Ngei Abe won the election, defeating other party candidates.

2011 Nigerian Senate election in Rivers State
Party	Candidate	Votes	%
PDP	Magnus Ngei Abe		
Total votes			
PDP hold			

=== Rivers West ===
Peoples Democratic Party candidate Wilson Asinobi Ake won the election, defeating party candidates.

2011 Nigerian Senate election in Rivers State
Party	Candidate	Votes	%
PDP	Wilson Asinobi Ake		
Total votes			
PDP hold			
