= Rivers State Ministry of Transport =

Nigerian Transport Ministry

Ministry overview
- Jurisdiction: Government of Rivers State
- Headquarters: 9th Floor, State Secretariat; Port Harcourt, Rivers State, Nigeria; 4°46′22″N 7°1′1″E
- Ministry executive: Chief Hon. Ibinabo Michael West, Commissioner; Permanent Secretary

The Rivers State Ministry of Transport is the government ministry responsible for matters concerning transportation issues and policy in Rivers State, Nigeria. The ministry has its headquarters on the 9th floor of the State Secretariat Building in Port Harcourt. Its current Commissioner is Chief Ibinabo Michael West.

== See also ==
- List of government ministries of Rivers State
