= Kenneth Chikere =

Nigerian politician

Member of the House of Representatives of Nigeria representing Port Harcourt I
- Incumbent
- Assumed office 2011
- Preceded by: Aguma Igochukwu

Personal details
- Party: PDP
- Profession: Politician

Kenneth Anayo Chikere (1955) is a Nigerian politician from People's Democratic Party. He represents Port Harcourt I constituency in the House of Representatives of Nigeria, a post he was elected to in 2011. He was a member of the People's Democratic Party (PDP). He later joined the All Progressives Congress (APC) in Rivers State.

== Background ==
Chikere attended St. Paul's Anglican School, Diobu, County Grammar School, Ikwerre-Etche, Port Harcourt University of Lagos, Nigerian Law School and London School of Economics.

== Political career ==
Chikere was elected to the Nigerian National House of Representatives in the general election of 2011 to represent Port Harcourt I. During this time he served as the Vice-Chairman at Federal Judiciary Committee (Reps) from June 2015 to June 2019, Committee Member at Legislative Budget and Research Committee (Reps) till May 2015 Committee Member at Aids, Loans and Debt Management Committee (Reps) till May 2015, Committee Member at Rules & Business Committee (Reps) till May 2015, Committee Member at Aviation Committee (Reps) till May 2015 and Committee Member at Sports Committee (Reps) till May 2015.
