= Tonye Princewill =

Nigerian investor, politician, film producer and philanthropist

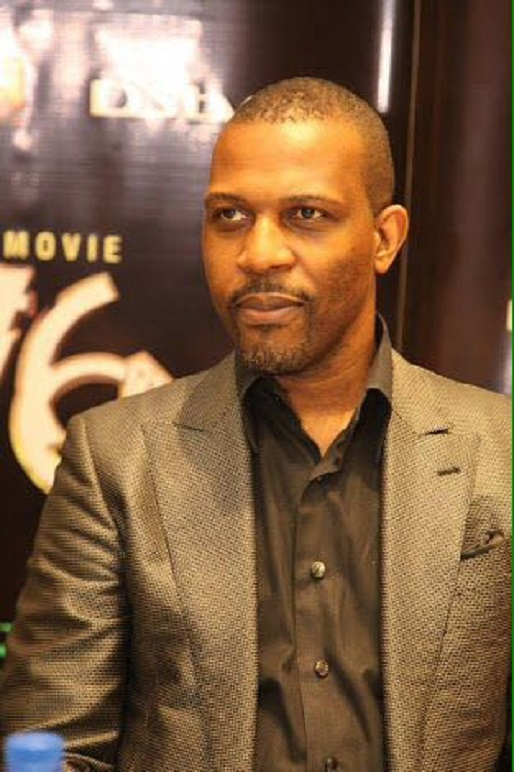
- Born: Tonye Princewill; 4 January 1969 (age 57); Kalabari Kingdom Rivers State, Nigeria)
- Education: Shire Oak, Leeds, United Kingdom St Gemmas, Leeds, United Kingdom Hillcrest School (Jos, Nigeria) Federal Government College, Port Harcourt University of Port Harcourt; Imperial College London
- Occupations: Paramount Ruler Nigerian Investor, Politician, Film Producer, Philanthropist
- Spouse: Rosemary
- Children: Azariah Princewill; Tamunotonye Princewill; Tamunopreye Princewill
- Website: https://www.rivexcelgroup.com

Tonye Princewill (born 4 January 1969) is a Nigerian investor, politician, film producer and philanthropist Currently the Paramount ruler of Da Ogo / Queen Elebabene Royal Group of Houses. He was the 2015 and 2007 candidate. for Governor of Rivers State. He was a member of the All Progressives Congress (APC) and the son of King T.J.T. Princewill of the Kalabari Kingdom of Rivers State, Nigeria. He resigned from All Progressives Congress APC because of same faith presidential ticket by the party.

== Early life and education ==
Tonye Princewill was born in the UK to the family of the King (Prof) T.J.T. Princewill, the Amanyanabo of Kalabari Kingdom of the Amachree Dynasty of Rivers State. His father was a Professor of Medical Microbiology before he became a monarch. His mother, Ibiere Princewill, an entrepreneur and notably successful in distribution and farming, died in 2000.

Princewill started his early education in the United Kingdom before returning with his parents to Nigeria, where he enrolled at Hillcrest High School in Jos from 1976–1980. He then attended Federal Government College (Port Harcourt) where he obtained his West African Senior Certificate/ General Certificate of Education O'Level in 1985. In 1990 he attained a BEng in Petroleum engineering at the University of Port Harcourt and later returned to the UK to successfully complete a master's degree in mineral resources engineering at the Imperial College London in 1994.

== Entertainment ==
Princewill produced the film Kajola, a film that explored the implications of the continuous neglect of the masses, the widening gap between the rich and poor and the ensuing catastrophic outcomes stemming from such neglect. Princewill also produced the film, Nnenda, which was geared towards creating awareness for the less-privileged in society. He produced other films such as Valour, a movie that deals with the Niger Delta and Boko Haram issues.

He is one of the executive producers of '76 (film).

== Politics ==
Princewill's political career started when he was nominated as the gubernatorial candidate of the Action Congress for the governorship of Rivers State in 2007. He was supported by the then former Vice-President of Nigeria and the AC Presidential candidate in 2007 elections, Atiku Abubakar and former Governor of Lagos and National Leader of ACN, Asiwaju Bola Tinubu. Princewill's campaign attracted significant grassroots support. He lost the election under contested circumstances to the People's Democratic Party's (PDP) candidate, Celestine Omehia.

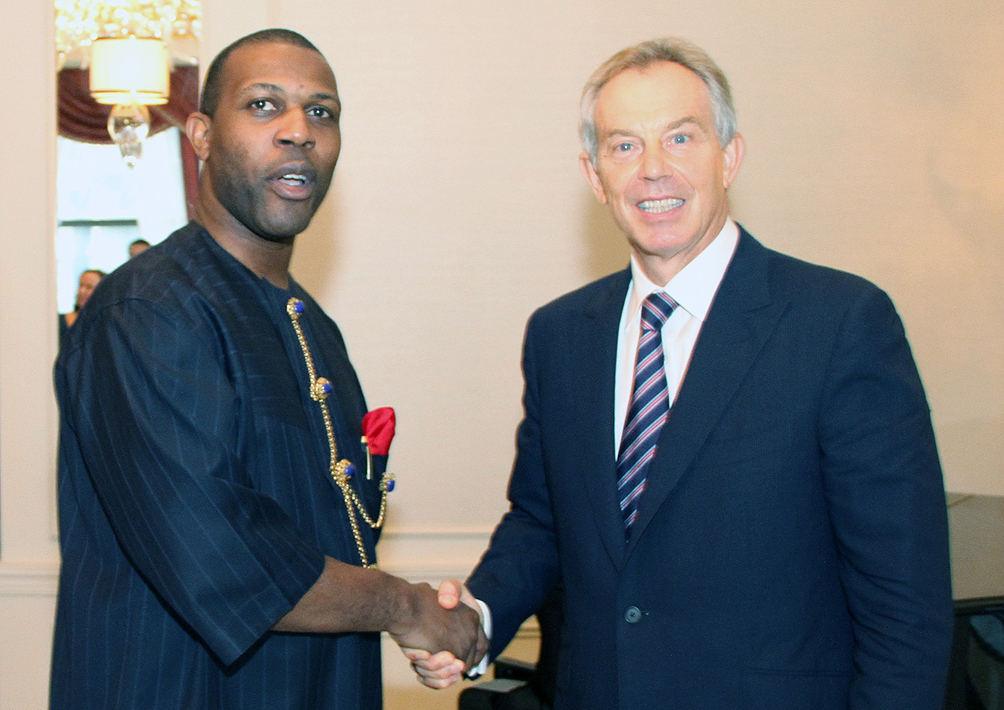
Princewill and former Britain's Prime Minister Tony Blair, April 2017

Princewill launched a legal challenge against the newly elected governor shortly after the election results were released. He offered evidence to prove to the electoral tribunal that the election was rigged. In a newspaper interview, he alleged that Celestine Omehia offered him a Naira 1.5 billion (approximately USD 10 million) bribe to withdraw the case before the tribunal, which he rejected.

Following a Supreme Court decision to replace Celestine Omehia with another People's Democratic Party candidate Rotimi Amaechi, he withdrew his case at the tribunal following a local party decision of the Action Congress in Rivers State, a move which drew criticism from some quarters. Tonye Princewill said in a report that "we took the decision at the time that the enemy of your enemy is your friend," indicating his opponents were Celestine Omehia and his 'godfather', Dr. Peter Odili, the former governor of Rivers State, when Rotimi Amaechi was installed by the court. He claimed that the decision to withdraw the case was made even easier because the same people who offered to give him 1.5 billion to withdraw his case, came back to offer him 1.5 billion and evidence of how they rigged the election against him to keep his case in court. This was hoping he would remove Amaechi.

Princewill later led members of the opposition parties in Rivers State under the banner of the Forum of Organized Opposition Political Parties to form a unity government with Amaechi's administration. Tonye Princewill's support of the Amaechi's government received mixed reviews. Some viewed it with scepticism, while others saw it as necessary for the development and stability of Rivers State. His announcement in 2010 that he was returning to the People's Democratic Party was controversial and weakened opposition in the state. But he insisted that threats being issued by national officers in AC to hand the structure of the party to his opponents if he didn’t bring money from Amaechi were no longer tenable. He joined PDP, but took a back seat.

In 2013, he joined the management committee of People's Democratic Movement (PDM), the founding movement behind the People's Democratic Party. Princewill has since removed his support of the PDP but PDM remains a movement. He currently serves as its Vice Chairman Southern Nigeria.

Statement of political plans

At the beginning of 2014, after several months of speculation on his political future, Princewill indicated his interest to succeed Rotimi Amaechi, the governor of Rivers State. Then in April 2014, he announced the formation of a committee to explore the viability of his candidacy of running for governor of Rivers State. Princewill was a governorship aspirant candidate for the People's Democratic Party, but in November 2014 announced that he had been disqualified on the instruction of Nyesom Wike, former minister of State for Education and fellow Governorship aspirant on the grounds of "not being a PDP member".

Princewill left PDP and in January 2015 was chosen as the governorship candidate of the Labour Party in Rivers State. Again, he lost that election in what was described as the most violent election ever as PDP and APC exchanged gunfire. In 2017 Princewill joined APC to challenge the PDP government.

Princewill was appointed Director of Strategic Communication for APC’s Tonye Cole during his 2018 gubernatorial campaign in Rivers state. The APC was prevented from contesting in the 2019 election courtesy of a controversial court judgement

In 2022, he considered a run for the Governor's office again but was discouraged by his friend Rotimi Amaechi who preferred him to play more national. In July 2022, he resigned from the APC and has since taken a back seat from active party politics, only occasionally commenting on the politics of the day.

== Professional career ==
Princewill was a PRINCE 2 certified Technical Project Manager and has held various key positions at Sun Microsystems, Panasonic, Citibank, Sony and HMCE in the United Kingdom, before returning to Nigeria to start up Delta Plus. He is currently Executive Chairman of the RivExcel Group and Member of the Board, American Hospital Dubai Nigeria Limited.

== Public affairs ==
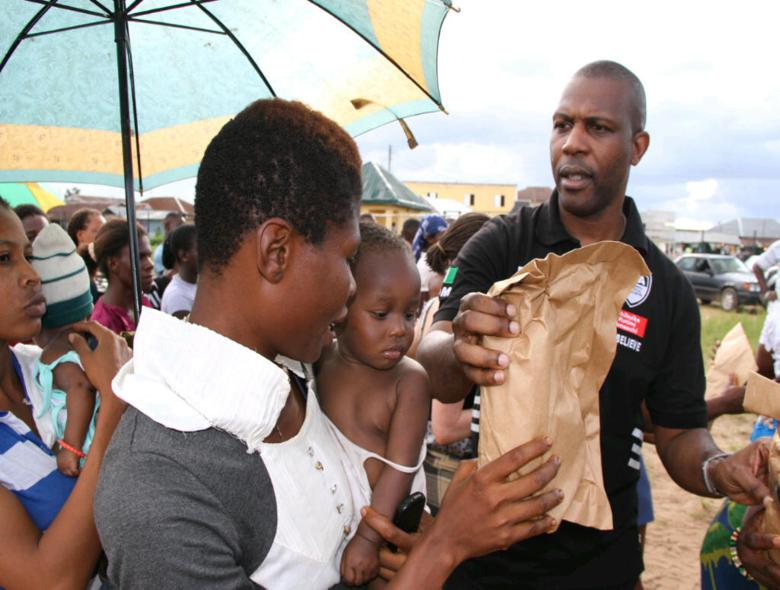
Princewill with victims of flooding

Princewill writes a weekly column in the Vanguard newspaper. He has expressed concern about the use of youth in Nigeria, particularly during elections, for violence and thuggery.

Following the heavy floods that ravaged parts of Nigeria in 2012, he organised relief activities for Niger Delta communities through the Princewill Trust. He has launched several initiatives to support Nigerian youth, rural women, orphans and widows. In June 2012, Princewill sponsored Nigerian youth delegations on tours to Dubai and Ghana to learn about entrepreneurship, governance, leadership and self-development.

In January 2013, in celebration of his 44th birthday, Princewill released a documentary titled "Man. Mentor. Maverick" in which he speaks about his vision of equal opportunities for all.

Princewill sponsored several baseline studies in 2013, covering the state of education, environment, and health in Rivers State. In education, research showed that a large number of Model Secondary and Primary Schools were not finished and had been abandoned. The management of oil spillages in Rivers State, a catalyst for youth restiveness, was seen as ineffective across local governments in the State. Survey respondents reported that funds which ought to have gone into cleaning and sanitisation of their communities were diverted by local officials. These findings also support press reports about corruption in government allocations to oil-producing areas. In the area of health, there is widespread disenchantment about the lack of improvement within the sector. Weak health service delivery in Rivers State is forcing many patients to seek medical attention at unregulated traditional medicine shops.

On the 4th of July, 2025, he was appointed chairman of the Board Trustees of the University of Port Harcourt Alumni association for a tenure of 4 years.

He is currently the Paramount ruler of Da Ogo / Queen Elebabene Royal Group of Houses.
