= Farah Dagogo =

Nigerian politician (born 1982)

Hon. Doctor Farah Dagogo
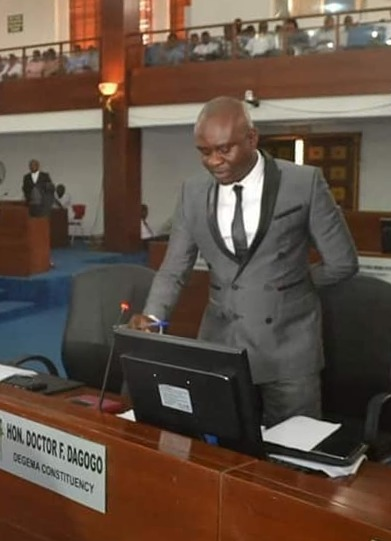

Member of the House of Representatives of Nigeria for Degema/Bonny
- Incumbent
- In office May 2019 – Present
- Preceded by: Randolph Iwo Oruene Brown

Personal details
- Born: 29 November 1982 (age 43) Port Harcourt
- Party: People's Democratic Party
- Occupation: politician

Farah Dagogo (born 29 November 1982) is a Nigerian politician. Hon. Dagogo was born in Port Harcourt. In 2019 he was elected as the representative of Degema/Bonny Federal Constituency in Rivers State for the People's Democratic Party. Prior to this he served as a lawmaker in the Rivers State House of representative.

== Background ==
Hon. Farah Dagogo holds a BSc in Sociology.

Before entering politics, he was a MEND field commander. He surrendered his weapons and accepted a government amnesty on 6 August 2009.

== Political career ==
Hon. Dagogo was elected to the Nigerian National House of Representatives in the general election of 2019 and was inaugurated on 29 May 2019.

Previously, he served as a lawmaker in the Rivers State House of Assembly Representing Degema Constituency. During this time he was the chair for the House committee on Education, focusing on the diversification of Rivers State University subject focus and upon funding sources for the states wider education system. He has also addressed issues regarding climate change and environmental degradation in the Niger Delta.
