= Afam, Rivers State =

Town in Rivers State, Nigeria

Afam
- Village
- Interactive map of Afam
- Country: Nigeria
- State: Rivers State
- Local Government Area: Oyigbo

Afam is a town in Oyigbo Local Government Area, Rivers State, Nigeria. The headquarter of Oyigbo is in Afam.

The community has a power generation hub and a gas plant. There is a 450 megawatt gas-fired power plant called Afam IV.
