= Bori City =

City in Khana, Rivers, Nigeria

- City
- Location within Nigeria
- Coordinates: 4°40′22″N 7°22′13″E
- Country: Nigeria
- State: Rivers State
- LGA: Khana

Government
  - Type: Local Government Area
  - Hon: Thomas Bariere Ariar

Area
  - Land: 50 km^{2} (19 sq mi)

Population (250,000)
  - Total: 250,000
  - Density: 5,000/km^{2} (13,000/sq mi)
- Time zone: UTC+1 (WAT)
- Postal code: 504

Bori City (audio) is an ancient city in Khana Local Government Area, Rivers State, southern Nigeria. It is the birthplace of author and activist Ken Saro-Wiwa.

Bori is the traditional headquarters of the Ogoni people. It serves as a commercial center for the Ogoni, Andoni, Opobo Annang and other ethnic nationalities of the Niger Delta Benue Congo. Bori is the host of the Kenule Beeson Saro-Wiwa Polytechnic.

The Bori Urban area communities are as follows including Bori Town, Kaani, Kor, Yeghe, Zaakpon, Betem 3, and Bo-Ue.

Bori is the second largest city in Rivers state after Port Harcourt and the commercial center of the Rivers southeast senatorial district in Rivers state.

Bori is an agricultural hub in Rivers state involving the production of yams, garri, maize, cocoyam, palm oil and vegetables. Also available are fishes and meat.The Bori main market is a daily market where these products can be bought in large quantities for local or export market.

Its also five minutes drive from the Nigeria Police Force Bori Area Command.

== Commission of Camp ==
The Nigerian Army in 2025 commissioned a new military camp in Bori City.

== Bori Market ==
Bori Market is a market in Bori.

== Notable People From Bori ==
- Lee Maeba
- Ken Saro Wiwa
- Muekara Monday
- Noo Saro Wiwa
- Owens Wiwa
