= Rivers South East senatorial district =

Senatorial district in Nigeria

Rivers South East senatorial district is one of the three senatorial districts in Rivers State, Nigeria. It is currently represented by Barinada Mpigi

== District profile ==
The district covers these local government areas: Andoni, Eleme, Gokana, Khana, Opobo–Nkoro, Oyigbo and Tai. In 2014, it had a projected population of 1,720,790.

LGA	Projected population (2014)	Wards
Andoni	275,718	11
Eleme	249,421	10
Gokana	299,002	17
Khana	384,443	19
Opobo–Nkoro	197,974	11
Oyigbo	160,311	10
Tai	153,921	10

== Election results ==
=== 2015 ===
Rivers South East Senate district election, 2015
Party	Candidate	Votes	%
PDP	Olaka Nwogu	408,353	94.66
APC	Magnus Abe	23,052	5.34
Total votes		431,405	100.00
PDP hold			

=== 2023 ===
Rivers South East Senate district election, 2023
Party	Candidate	Votes	%
PDP	Mpigi Barinada	53,734	94
APC	Ngofa Nyimenuate	24,123	6
Total votes		77,857	100.00
PDP hold			

== List of senators ==
- Adawari Pepple (1999 – 2003)
- Lee Maeba (2003 – 2011)
- Magnus Abe (2011 – 2015, 2016 – 2019)
- Olaka Nwogu (2015)
- Barry Mpigi (2019 - Present)
