= 2015 Rivers State gubernatorial election =

- 11 April 2015
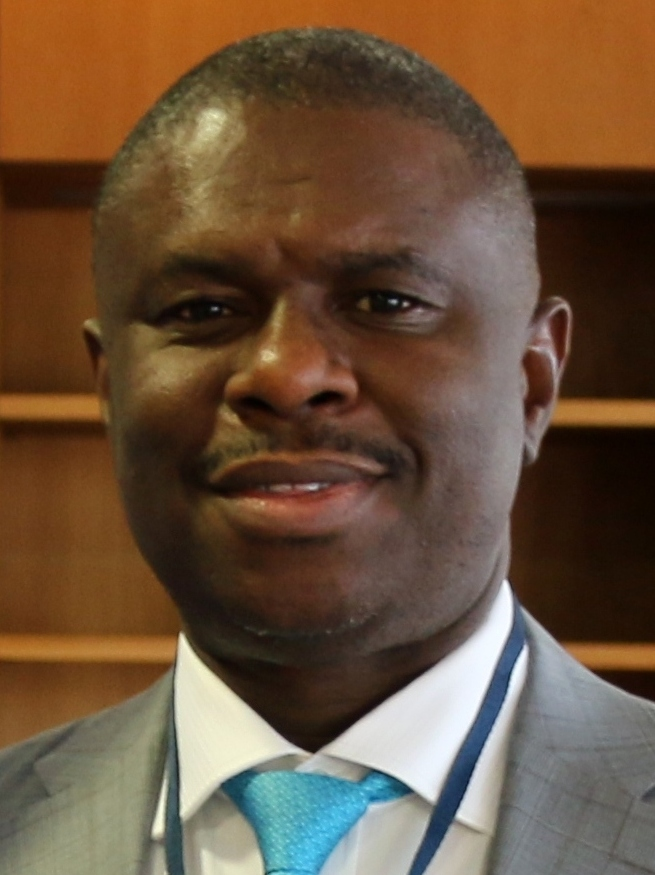
	PDP
Nominee	Ezenwo Wike	Dakuku Peterside
Party	PDP	APC
Running mate	Ipalibo Banigo	Okorie Asita
Popular vote	1,029,102	124,896
Percentage	87.77%	10.65%
Governor before election
Chibuike Amaechi
All Progressives Congress
Elected Governor
Ezenwo Wike
People's Democratic Party

The election for Governor of Rivers State took place on 11 April 2015. People's Democratic Party candidate Ezenwo Wike, a former Minister of State for Education defeated All Progressives Congress candidate Dakuku Peterside and Labour Party candidate Tonye Princewill.

The Governor and Deputy Governor of Rivers State are elected on the same ticket.

== PDP primary ==
People's Democratic Party candidate Ezenwo Wike ran an effective campaign and was unopposed for the 8 December 2014 Primary. He won with 97.65 percent of the vote against four other opponents, including Lee Maeba, the senator for Rivers State South East constituency.

=== Candidates ===
- Ezenwo Wike, former Minister of State for Education
- Dumbari Dimkpa
- West Ibinabo
- Emmanuel Georgewill
- Lee Maeba, Senator

=== Results ===
PDP primary results
Party	Candidate	Votes	%
PDP	Ezenwo Wike	1,083	97.65
PDP	Dumbari Dimkpa	21	1.89
PDP	West Ibinabo	3	0.27
PDP	Emmanuel Georgewill	1	0.09
PDP	Lee Maeba	1	0.09
Total votes		1,109	100

== APC primary ==
=== Candidates ===
- Dakuku Peterside, member of the House of Representatives

=== Results ===
APC primary results
Party	Candidate	Votes	%
APC	Dakuku Peterside	3,773	96.39
Invalid or blank votes		140	3.57
Total votes		3,914	100

== General election ==
=== Results ===
Rivers State gubernatorial election, 2015
Party	Candidate	Votes	%	±%
PDP	Ezenwo Wike	1,029,102	87.77	
APC	Dakuku Peterside	124,896	10.65	
LP	Tonye Princewill	10,142	0.86	
APGA	Priye Harry	3146	0.27	
PPA	Boma Jacks	868	0.07	
SDP	Minaibim Harry	843	0.07	
UPP	Akuro Parker	792	0.068	
ID	Nelson Amieye	604	0.052	
APA	Livingstone Nodi	370	0.03	
DPP	Nsirim Chima	324	0.028	
AA	Senabo Jaja	285	0.02	
HDP	Okechukwu Ehogwo	266	0.023	
NNPP	Godwin David	261	0.02	
KOWA	Kemka Elenwo	187	0.016	
AD	Uchechukwu Ichenwo	125	0.01	
CPP	Enyida Udo	119	0.01	
NCP	Anatasia Tepikor	104	0.01	
ACPN	Chinemike Orgwu	101	0.01	
Majority		904,206	77.12	
Turnout		1,172,535		
PDP hold		Swing		

== See also ==
- Nigerian National Assembly election, 2015 (Rivers State)
