= Ibinabo Michael West =

Nigerian politician (born 1963)

Ibinabo Michael West (born 23 January 1963) is a Nigerian politician and the current Commissioner of Transport in Rivers State.

Before he was appointed as a commissioner in March 2018, he contested in the PDP governorship primaries and lost to the current governor of Rivers state, Nyesom Ezenwo Wike. In 2003 West was elected as an Hon. Assembly Member in Rivers State House of Assembly. He served for two terms before stepping down to make space for others seeking to represent their constituencies. While in Rivers State House of Assembly, he was known for various constituency projects and empowerment projects.
