= Magnus Ngei Abe =

Nigerian politician (born 1965)

Senator for Rivers South East
- Incumbent
- Assumed office 15 December 2016
- In office May 2011 – May 2015
- Preceded by: Lee Maeba
- Succeeded by: Barry Mpigi

Minority Leader of the Rivers State House of Assembly
- In office 1999–2003
- Governor: Peter Odili
- Succeeded by: Gabriel Pidomson

Commissioner for Information
- In office May 2003 – May 2007

Personal details
- Born: 24 May 1965 (age 61) Nchia, Eleme, Rivers State
- Party: Social Democratic Party

Magnus Ngei Abe (born 24 May 1965) is a Nigerian politician, and a lawyer who served as a Senator for the Rivers Southeast Senatorial District of Rivers State, Nigeria. He was first elected to the Nigerian Senate in 2011 in the April 2011 Federal elections and again in a rerun poll in December 2016. In the 2015 general elections, he had lost a return bid to Senator Olaka Nwogu. Before the poll, like others in Rivers, was invalidated by the court, necessitating a rerun poll. In 2019, Abe was succeeded by Hon. Barry Mpigi. He was nominated by President Bola Ahmed Tinubu to be the chairman of the board, of the Nigerian Upstream Petroleum Regulatory Commission in April 2026.

== Early life and education ==
Magnus Ngei Abe was born on 24 May 1965 in Nchia, Eleme Local Government Area of Rivers State. He attended St. Patrick College, Ikot-Ansa, Calabar (the capital city of Cross River State) and Akpor Grammar School, Ozuoba.

== Law career ==
After obtaining an LL.B degree in law, he was called to Nigerian Bar in 1987, starting work as a Pupil State Counsel for the Federal Ministry of Justice, Lagos State. He went into private practice as a junior partner with Okocha & Okocha, Manuchim Chambers, later becoming a managing partner with Etim-Inyang, Abe in Port Harcourt.

== Political career ==
Abe entered politics in 1999 when he was elected into the Rivers State House of Assembly, serving as a Minority Leader. In 2003, he defected to the Peoples' Democratic Party (PDP), and from 2003 to 2007 he was Commissioner of Information in Rivers State in the administration of Governor Peter Odili. When Governor Chibuike Amaechi entered office in May 2007, Abe was appointed as Secretary to the State Government.

In the April 2011 elections, Abe gained 154,218 votes, ahead of Dr. Nomate Toate Kpea of the Action Congress of Nigeria (ACN) with 34,978 votes. Senator Magnus Abe defected to All Progressives Congress (APC) on 29 January 2014. In 2019, he aspired to contest for the governorship of Rivers State but could not secure the party's nomination. In January 2025, President Bola Tinubu appointed him board chairman of the National Agency for the Great Green Walls.

He was nominated by President Bola Ahmed Tinubu, to be the Chairman of the board of the Nigerian Upstream Petroleum Regulatory Commission. He was confirmed by the Nigerian Senate, and officially assumed office on the 28th of April, 2026.
