= Opobo/Nkoro =

- LGA
- Interactive map of Opobo/Nkoro
- Location within Nigeria
- Coordinates: 4°34′5″N 7°33′10″E
- Country: Nigeria
- State: Rivers State
- Headquarter: Opobo

Government
  - Local Government Chairman: Enyiada Cooley-Gam (PDP)
  - Deputy Local Government Chairman: Angela Anthony Ojukemie (PDP)
  - Local Government Council: Ward 1: Adawari Gabriel Diri (PDP); Ward 2: Justice Dappa (PDP); Ward 3: Abinye M. Peterside (PDP); Ward 4: Somiari R. Cooked (PDP); Ward 5: Senibo Samuel Manilla (PDP); Ward 6: Michael D.P.C. Brown (PDP); Ward 7: Tumini Accra Jaja (PDP); Ward 8: Uranta Ruth Chinasa (PDP); Ward 9: Livingstone Elijah Joshua (PDP); Ward 10: Gabriel Gabriel (PDP); Ward 11: Miller Ibiba Augustus (PDP)
- Time zone: UTC+1 (WAT)

Opobo/Nkoro is a Local Government Area in Rivers State, Nigeria. It is part of the Andoni/Gokana/Khana/Oyigbo/Tai/Eleme constituency of the Nigerian National Assembly delegation from Rivers. The capital of Opobo/Nkoro is Opobo Town.

== Climate/Geography ==
Opobo Nkoro LGA features multiple rivers and streams that flow within its boundaries, along with an average temperature of 25 degrees Celsius (77 degrees Fahrenheit). There are two distinct seasons in the LGA; The rainy and The dry season. The LGA has sizable forest reserves. In Opobo Nkoro LGA, the average humidity is reported to be 79%.
