= Tonye Cole =

Nigerian businessman (born 1967)

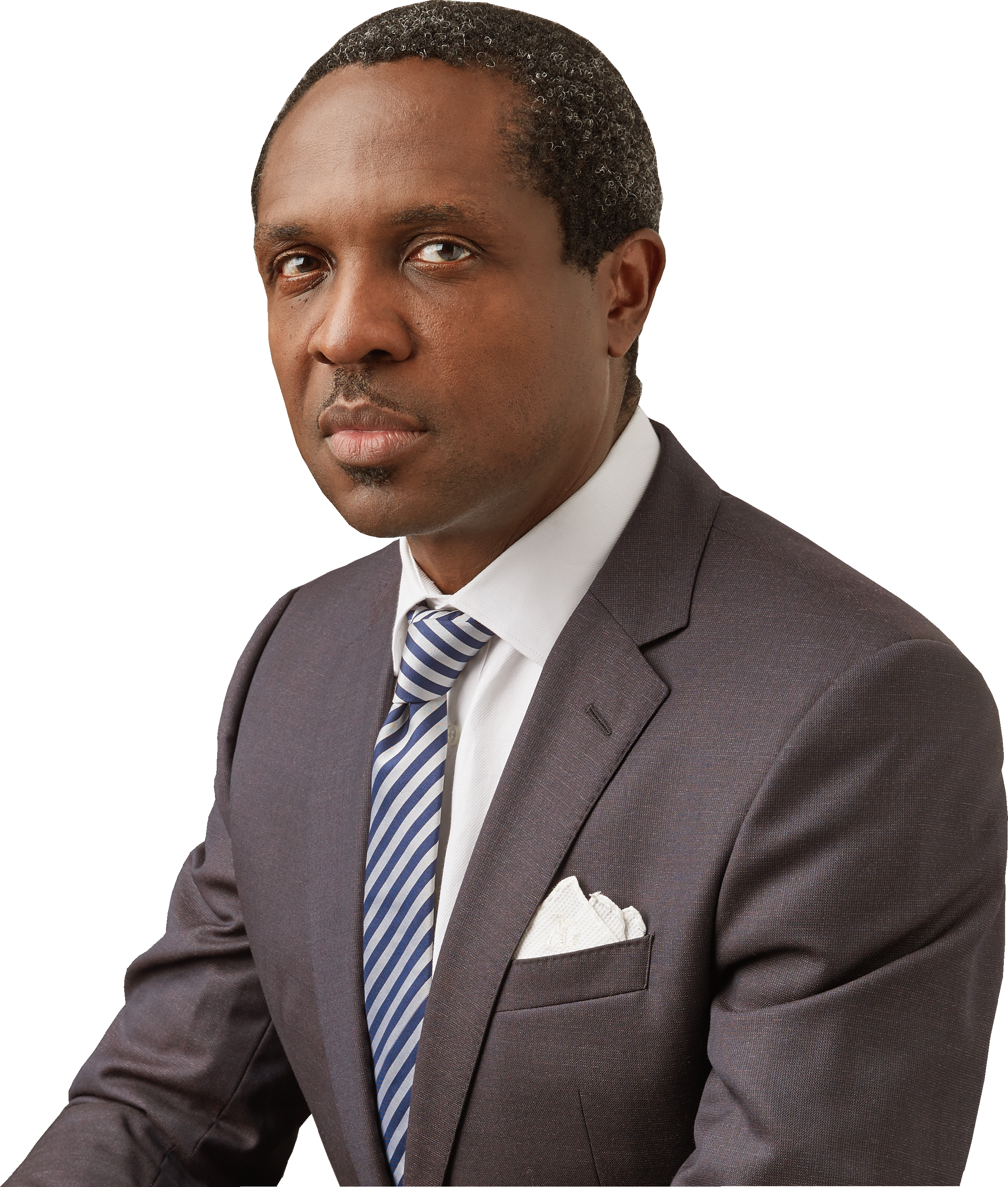
- Born: Tonye Patrick Cole; 11 January 1967 (age 59); Abonnema, Eastern Region, Nigeria (now in Rivers State, Nigeria)
- Education: Harvard Business School; University of Brasília; University of Lagos; King's Ely; King's College, Lagos; Corona School, Lagos, Nigeria
- Occupations: Co-Founder, Sahara Group
- Years active: 1996—2018
- Political party: All Progressives Congress
- Spouse: Sylvia Cole
- Children: Vanessa Cole; TJ Cole; Serena Cole
- Website: Official website

Tonye Patrick Cole (born 11 January 1967) is a Nigerian billionaire businessman, he is the co-founder and former Group Executive Director of Sahara Group an energy conglomerate with operations spanning the entire energy chain in Nigeria and neighbouring West African countries to East Africa and beyond. The Group operates in 38 countries around the world with over 4,000 employees and annual turnover of $11 billion. He was directly responsible for building the Group's global expansion and upholding her corporate governance principles, maintaining her status with global institutions like the World Economic Forum, where he was a key member of Partnering Against Corruption Initiative (PACI), The United Nations), where he was a pioneer member of the advisory board of the Private Sector Advisory Group for the UNDP Sustainable Development Group Fund (SDG-F), The African Philanthropy Forum amongst others.

In addition to founding and running one of Nigeria's largest energy conglomerates, he also spearheaded and developed work carried out for the Sahara Foundation globally. He continues working to inspire the youth of Africa through charities such as his NGO, Nehemiah Youth Empowerment initiative, which aims to influence change in Africa by bringing together young and emerging leaders to develop and implement practical strategies that will produce positive outcomes for millions and more recently, Behavioral Health Institute (BHI) that he set up for the study and management of behavioral health issues especially among the youths in Nigeria. In addition, he works closely with a number of foundations in Nigeria including the Down Syndrome Foundation, Slum-2-School Foundation, The Compassionate Center and various orphanages. He served as a board member for Atlas Mara, Bloomberg TV Africa, Enactus Nigeria, Nigerian Chamber of Shipping and Digital Jewels. He is also a member the Private Sector Advisory Group of the United Nations Sustainable Development Fund (UN SDG-F). and He was appointed to the World Bank Group's (WBG) Expert Advisory Council on Citizen Engagement.

== Biography ==
Tonye Cole was born in Port Harcourt, Rivers state on the 11 January 1967. He attended Corona School, Victoria Island and later King's college, Lagos before proceeding to King's Ely, Cambridgeshire, United Kingdom. He is also an alumnus of University of Lagos where he bagged a bachelor's degree in Architecture and Engineering, then a Portuguese Certificate from Universidade de Brasilia, Brazil. He is also a graduate of Harvard Business School's Advanced Management Program in 2014. The Brazilian architectural firm Grupo Quartro SA in Goiania Brazil was where he started his career as an Architect from 1990 to 1992. He was also involved in the design and implementation of the urban planning and city development of Palmas, the capital city to the state of Tocantins in miles away South America. He was also the architect responsible for the design of The Ministry of Justice Building, Palmas, Tocantins and the various residential houses in Goiania, Palmas and Brasilia among others. Tonye returned to Nigeria in 1993 and was quickly employed as the Director of Operations with the Nigerian office of Empressa Sul Americana de Montagens S.A.(EMSA) a Brazilian Civil Engineering Company from 1993 – 1996, which is allegedly the 7th largest engineering firm in Brazil that was awarded a World Bank – financed water project valued at about S5.8m for the Lagos Water Corporation. Mr. Cole is an ordained minister of the Redeemed Christian Church of God and leader of Team Nehemiah. A body within the church that is responsible for the delivering the vision of the church in transforming the Redemption Camp in Nigeria to a modern city. He is a motivational speaker, writer, teacher and mentor. He is the author of "Morning Reflections" a daily devotional published in 2013. He is the son of former managing director of the Daily Times Newspaper and former Ambassador of Nigeria to Brazil Patrick Dele-Cole. He is married to Dr. Sylvia Cole and blessed with three adult children.

== Publication ==
- Author of "Morning Reflections". A Daily Devotional Published 2013.
- Author of "My God Thinks" (2016)
- Columnist to Thisday Style "Watchers of Times"

== Awards ==
- 2017 Oil & Gas Council Lifetime Achievement and Executive of The Year Award.
- 2014 Wharton Club Of Africa Award For Best Company To Work For.
- 2013 Forbes/Ebonylife TV Best of Africa Award
- 2011 African Property Awards/Bloomberg TV For Highly Commendable Office Architecture
- 2011 Ernst & Young Entrepreneur Of The Year Finalist
- 2010 Thisday Award As Young Global Champions In Oil And Gas
- 2009 Role Model Award By We Are The Future Of Our Nation In Recognition Of Contribution In Oil And Gas Sector
- 2007 Merit Award By University Of Lagos Alumni Association For Outstanding Contributions And Commitment To National Development.

== Politics ==
In September 2018, Mr Cole made a decision to pursue a career in politics. He formally resigned from all board and executive roles held in Sahara Group as well as all his board positions elsewhere to contest for the gubernatorial seat in his home state of Rivers. This is an elective political position in Nigeria. He won the primaries under the national ruling party, the All Progressives Congress (APC) and declared the flag bearer but due to a protracted inter-party legal tussle, the party was removed from the ballot and prevented from contesting in the 2019 gubernatorial elections by the courts. Mr. Cole consolidated on the political gains made to build a formidable team ahead of future elections.

On 26 May 2022, Tonye Cole emerged as the flag bearer of the All Progressive's Congress (APC) for the 2023 gubernatorial elections after winning 77% of the delegate votes at the primaries. On 25 October 2022, a Federal High Court ruling annulled all Rivers APC primaries. The Rivers APC protested the ruling and Cole was reinstated by the Court of Appeal in January 2023.
