= Gokana, Nigeria =

Gokana
- LGA
- Interactive map of Gokana
- Location within Nigeria Location within Africa
- Coordinates: 4°36′N 7°18′E
- Country: Nigeria
- State: Rivers State
- Date created: 1991
- Seat: Kpor

Government
  - Local Government Chairman: Deko Confidence (PDP)
  - Deputy Local Government Chairman: Edith B. Vizung (PDP)

Area
  - Total: 126 km^{2} (49 sq mi)

Population (2006)
  - Total: 228,828
  - Density: 1,820/km^{2} (4,700/sq mi)
- Time zone: UTC+1 (WAT)
- Postal code: 504

Gokana (audio) is a Local Government Area in Rivers State, Nigeria. Its headquarters is in the town/community of Kpor, but the traditional headquarters is Giokoo. It happens to be a part of the Ogoni tribe.

It has an area of 126 km^{2} and a population of 228,828 at the 2006 census. The local language is the Gokana language. Gokana is also divided into two major divisions which are Dee-nwee Gokana also known as pa numuu and Dee-si Gokana also known as pa bookpo.

The postal code of the area is 504.

== Kingdom and administrative divisions ==
The Gokana kingdom is headed by a king called the "Gbere Mene" of Gokana Kingdom whose stool is situated at the traditional headquarters of Gokana (Giokoo). Gokana shares boundaries with Tai to the north, Ogu-Bolo to the west, Khana to the east, and Bonny to the south. Gokana is divided into seventeen towns/communities:

- Degen
- Deeyor
- Yeghe
- Biara
- Nwebiara
- Barako
- Nweol
- Giokoo
- Bera
- Lewe
- Bomu
- Mogho
- Kpor
- Baranyonwa Dere
- Kegbara Dere
- Goi
- Bodo

Each town is headed by a king. The seventeen towns/communities are further subdivided into villages. All seventeen towns have one common ancestry.

== Religion and culture ==
The main religions are christianity and traditional African religions; although most of its customs, traditions and festivals have become extinct due to urbanization and rural-urban migration, some have survived.

Amongst these is the "Naa Bira Dae" festival, celebrated around late March to early April in honour of the goddess of the night. It lasts for 15 days or three local weeks and during this period, no woman, child or uninitiated adult male is allowed to go out, except emergency services such as the police. Weddings, burials (of people who died in old age) and the naming of a child are important ceremonies among the people of Gokana and they are celebrated in style.

The native Gokana week is made up of five days namely: Maa, Bon, Zua, SJon, Koo (pronounced cur). Koo is the official sabbath or rest day when their indigenes were to stay at home and not go to the farm. However, it is worthy to note that the days of rest now differs as different communities now have their own days.

== Language ==
The Gokana language, of the Ogonoid group of the Cross-River branch of the large Niger-Congo language family, is the main spoken language.

== Climate and geography ==
Gokana experiences year-round heat and humidity due to its tropical location. At 126 km^{2} (49 sq mi), the average temperature is 26-27 degrees (79-81 degrees Fahrenheit), and the average humidity is 80-87%. The Gokana Local Government is traversed by multiple rivers and tributaries.
