= Ogba–Egbema–Ndoni =

Ogba/Egbema/Ndoni (ONELGA), Rivers State Nigeria

- LGA
- Interactive map of Ogba–Egbema–Ndoni
- Location within Nigeria Location within Africa
- Coordinates: 5°20′30″N 6°39′20″E
- Country: Nigeria
- State: Rivers State
- Date created: 1991
- Seat: Omoku

Government
  - Local Government Chairman: Hon. Dr. Shedrack Chukwu Esq (APC)
  - Deputy Local Government Chairman: Agada Stella (PDP)
  - Local Government Council: Ward 1: Azubuike Ossia (PDP); Ward 2: Sarah Woko (PDP); Ward 3: Eze Ordu (PDP); Ward 4: Joy Omasikachukwu Olowu (PDP); Ward 5: Author Azubuike Uzor (PDP); Ward 6: Paul Ohaji Ikwuladi (PDP); Ward 7: Victor Ahiakwo (PDP); Ward 8: Bridget Oreke (PDP); Ward 9: Ndubuisi Egbe (PDP); Ward 10: Matthew Nwakoma Newman (PDP); Ward 11: Kenneth Nwadiaru (PDP); Ward 12: Ekwem Douglas (PDP); Ward 13: Obiosa Chinedu (PDP); Ward 14: Opene Chukwuwike (PDP); Ward 15: Eke Ebere Gloria (PDP); Ward 16: Onyeije Theophilus (PDP); Ward 17: Stanley Onisha Agilebu (PDP)

Area
  - Total: 1,621 km^{2} (626 sq mi)

Population (2006)
  - Total: 258,700
  - Density: 159.6/km^{2} (413.3/sq mi)
- Time zone: UTC+1 (WAT)

Ogba–Egbema–Ndoni (also written as Ogba/Egbema/Ndoni or ONELGA) is a Local Government Area of Rivers State, in South-South Nigeria (Old Ahoada LGA) under Rivers West Senatorial District, with its headquarters at Omoku. With about 258,700 People according to 2006 Census. It is bounded by Imo, Delta, Bayelsa, and Anambra States and also by Ahoada West, Ahoada East and Emohua Local Government Areas of Rivers State. They are part of the Igbo ethnic group in Rivers State with three tribes starting with Ogba as the dominant tribe with 12 legislative wards, the Egbema (which are also found in Imo state) and Ndoni people who are also found in Ukwuani L.G.A (in Delta State precisely) both with 2&3 legislative wards respectively. It is majorly upland and home to the highest upstream Oil and Gas exploration/exploitation activity in the State since the early 1960s with about 12 mining/producing fields operated by AGIP, Total Energies and Shell/NPDC with many other reserve/untapped fields. It is part of the Ogba / Egbema / Ndoni / Ahoada West constituency of the Nigerian House of Representatives. Sir. Dr. Chukwu Shedrack O. ESQ. DSSRS, JP. is the Executive Chairman of ONELGA. He came into office september 2025.

The ancient traditional stool of the area is: The Oba of Ogbaland, The Nze-Obi of Egbema Kingdom and the Awor of Ndoni howeverso, recently, The Eze Egi of Egi Kingdom in Ogbaland was also adopted and elevated to first-class status joining the former as revered traditional institutions in the LGA.

From the Local Government, it is possible to journey to the Onitsha World market through River Niger. The Local Government has arable and fertile land for agricultural and industrial uses.

== Population ==
The Ogba–Egbema–Ndoni Local Government Area is named after the three respective tribes who inhabit this territory, the Ogba, Egbemas whose brothers also occupy Ohaji/Egbema in Imo State, and the Ndoni people who are affiliated to their brothers in Ukwuani in Delta State and Ogbaru in Anambra State.

=== Secondary Schools ===
- Idu Comprehensive High School, Idu Obosiukwu
- Community Secondary School Obagi
- Community Girls Secondary School Omoku
- Egbema Grammar school
- Community Secondary School Aggah Community

== Notable people ==
- Peter Odili
