= Ogu–Bolo =

- LGA
- Nickname: Ogu Apu Tonye Mie
- Motto: Unity, Service and Development
- Interactive map of Ogu–Bolo
- Location within Nigeria Location within Africa
- Coordinates: 4°42′N 7°12′E
- Country: Nigeria
- State: Rivers State
- Date created: 1 October 1996
- Seat: Ogu Town

Government
  - Body: Local Government Council
  - Local Government Chairman: Engr. Ishmael Oforibika MNSE (APP)
  - Deputy Local Government Chairman: Barr. Christiana Tamunobereton-Ari (APP)
  - Local Government Council: Ward 1: Emmanuel Boma Igbikibereibima (APP); Ward 2: Tamunosiki Tende (APP); Ward 3: Samuel Afonka (APP); Ward 4: Amba Afamaboka (APP); Ward 5: Promise Tamunobelema (APP); Ward 6: Elliot Ada (APP); Ward 7: Toku Lawson Joshua (APP); Ward 8: Asiseamatonka Osaru (APP); Ward 9: Tamunoseipiriala Standford (APP); Ward 10: Amamina Tamunokuro (APP); Ward 11: Williams Hannah Ikpo (APP); Ward 12: Johnson Ishmael Ward (APP)

Area
  - Total: 89 km^{2} (34 sq mi)

Population
  - Estimate (2020): 119,000
- Time zone: UTC+1 (WAT)
- Postal Code: 500104

Ogu–Bolo (also spelled Ogu/Bolo) is a local government area (LGA) in Rivers State, Nigeria, with its administrative headquarters in the town of Ogu. It is situated in the eastern part of the Niger Delta, the Ogu–Bolo people are of Ijaw descent and represent one of the 11 local government areas in Rivers State with Ijaw heritage.

Ogu–Bolo Local Government Area (LGA) covers an area of 89 km² (34 sq mi) and had an estimated population of over 119,000 as of 2020, according to the Rivers State Primary Health Care Management Board. Located in the Rivers South East Senatorial District, it is neighboured by Eleme LGA in the west, Tai LGA in the north, Bonny LGA, Wakama Ama and Bolo communities in the south, and Okrika LGA in the southwest.

Farming is the predominant occupation of the people, with Christianity being the major religion, alongside a few adherents of African Traditional Religion. The primary ethnic group in the area is the Wakrikese, a sub-group of the larger Ijaw tribe. The postal code for Ogu–Bolo is 500104.

== About ==
Ogu/Bolo is neighboured by Eleme LGA in the west, Tai LGA in the north, Bonny LGA, Wakama Ama and Bolo communities in the south, and Okrika LGA in the southwest.

Ogu/Bolo LGA consists of the districts of Bolo, Ele, Ogu, and Wakama, along with many other communities such as Adiai-Obiofu, Agwe, Amuajie, Ase-Imonita, Ase-Azaga, Isara, and others. Nearby cities and villages include Tai, Gokana, and Okrika. Neighbouring communities in other LGAs include: Sime, Barale, Barayira, Eteo, Norkpo, and Nonwa in Tai LGA; Eteo and Onne in Eleme LGA; and Mgbemgbe Boko in Okrika LGA.

== Climate/Geography ==
Ogu Bolo LGA has an average temperature of 26 degrees Celsius (79 degrees Fahrenheit) and a total area of 89 square kilometres (34 square miles). The dry and wet seasons are the two distinct seasons that the LGA experiences. There are numerous rivers and streams that traverse the LGA.

The region can be accessed by sea or land. It has well over 50 satellite villages and fishing settlements which can be reached from the sea by Ogu Creek and the Bonny River. These include:

- Abereniboye Kiri
- Ada Ama I
- Ada Ama II
- Adokiye kiri
- Adolphus Nemieboka Kiri
- Adufe Ama
- Afaka Ama
- Agakien Ama
- Agakien Kiri
- Amabara Ama
- Anigoboka Ama
- Apanatibo Kiri
- Atubonacheofoin-a Ama
- Brown Ama
- Bumo Kiri
- Chuku Ama
- Chuku Ama II
- Daso Ama
- Febie Ama
- Fombo Ama
- Fulobele Kiri
- Gream Kiri
- Ibiebele Kiri
- Ibiorika Kiri
- Ichi Kiri
- Igafe Ama
- Igbikiyemieari Ama
- Ikikafipiri Ama
- Ikpokiri I
- Ikpokiri II
- Ikpokiri III (wharf)
- Ilanga/Yikabo Ama
- IpiangbafibumoKiri
- Iwomabie Ama
- Kulo Kiri
- Mbi Kiri
- Mgbemgbeboko (Fubara Kiri)
- Nemieboka Ama
- New Ogu (Kporo Ama)
- Niniapukiri
- Nyanabo Ama
- Odo Kiri
- Ogobo Ama
- Ogonotoru Ama
- Ogugu-Chuku Ama
- Ogweinbie Ama
- Olobulo Ama
- Olomusoko Ama
- Omodarani Ama
- Orabere Kiri
- Orubie Ama
- Otobipi Kiri
- Owuapuigbiki Kiri
- Owugono Ama
- Owukiri Ama
- Owupele Ama
- Piri Ama
- Sani Kiri
- Semenibipi/Iyo Kiri
- Siere Ama
- Tamuno Ama (Ofunguru Ama)
- Tende Ama
- Tendefe Ama
- Tombikuku
- Tububie Ama
- Yikabo Kiri
- Olobulo Ama
- Yude Ama

== Culture ==
The Ogu/Bolo people have a distinctive and diverse culture, showcased in their festivals, cultural attire, and food. Important traditions in the culture of Ogu/Bolo people are the Iria puberty and marriage ceremonies, wrestling, traditional plays, burial rites, installation of chiefs, traditional rulers' ceremonies, and rites connected with day-to-day life.

Masquerades play a particularly important cultural role. Some are colourful with make-ups or paraphernalia, and are a common sight throughout communities, especially during festive occasions. These performances are either religious, historical, or the personifications of legends, and are accompanied by song, music, and dance. Musical instruments used include pots and drums, wooden gongs, horns, and xylophones. All these are made locally by experts with an ancient tradition behind their craftsmanship.

Carving of masks and ceremonial canoes is a revered art, having matured in style and quality over generations. Gradually, the purely functional forms of these carvings were given new dimension and refinement which reflected a sense of aesthetic values.

The dances, plays, and masquerades depict the religious, social, and working life of the people. In turn, the life of the people has been greatly influenced by their culture. Thus, a spiritually ennobling circle has been set up.The cultural practices of the Ogu/Bolo people continue to shape community values and social norms across generations.

== Trade and commerce ==
Fishing and peasant farming are the main economic activities of Ogu/Bolo communities. Trading is principally done within the contiguous communities of Tai, Eleme, Bonny, and Andoni. The introduction of "legitimate" trade by Europeans in the mid-20th century increased the volume of commercial activities in Ogu.

== Religious activities ==
Christianity and Western education were introduced by missionaries. The St. Martin's Anglican Church in Ogu was completed in 1966. Even today, the church stands, not only as an architectural edifice, but also as a monumental and durable evidence of a peoples’ ancient devotion to progressive thought and action.

In 1973, the first post-primary school in Ogu/Bolo LGA was established: Government Secondary School, Ogu. For many years, this college remained distinguished from others by its priority. By the mid-1970s, Ogu had a modern hospital, good drinking water, and tarred roads.

== Sources ==
- Abomaye-Nimenibo, W.A.S.; Abomaye-Nimenibo, Comfort Tamunobarasinpiri; Minabere, Harry Abomaye (23 December 2017). "The Socio-Economic Dilemma And Challenges Of Population Growth Of Ogu Urban Town As A Nigerian Rural Community". Global Journal of Management and Business Research, E. Marketing. 1.0. 17 (4).
- Abomaye-Nimenibo, Williams Aminadokiari Samuel (2018). "The Socio-Economic and Pathological Effects of Youth Unemployment in Ogu/Bolo Local Government Authority Area of Rivers State, Nigeria". Global Journal of HUMAN-SOCIAL SCIENCE: E Economics. 1.0. 18 (3). eISSN 2249-460X. ISSN 0975-587X.
