= Degema, Nigeria =

Degema
- LGA and town
- Interactive map of Degema
- Location within Nigeria Location within Africa
- Coordinates: 4°48′N 6°48′E
- Country: Nigeria
- State: Rivers State
- Date created: 27 May 1967

Government
  - Local Government Chairman: Dr. Agiriye Monima Harry (APP)
  - Deputy Local Government Chairman: Hon. Mrs. Ibimina Jaja (APP)
  - Local Government Council: Ward 1: Enegberenaa Godspower (APP); Ward 2: Tekena Dapper (APP); Ward 3:Somina Longjohn (APP); Ward 4: Destiny Ago Walson (APP); Ward 5: Tombo Dohubo Benjamin (PDP); Ward 6: Elis Da-Ombu Faith (PDP); Ward 7: Alapuye Duke (PDP); Ward 8: Johnson E. Johnson (PDP); Ward 9: Agborubere Ngokombo B. (PDP); Ward 10; Patience Ikiroma-Owiye (PDP); Ward 11: Ideresin Garrick (PDP); Ward 12: Sweiyi Moses Benneth (PDP); Ward 13: Iwayivi Dede Solomon (PDP); Ward 14: Tamunoemi O. Harry (PDP); Ward 15: Lugard Cousin Daminabo (PDP); Ward 16: Elvis Osima Gogo (PDP); Ward 17: Mrs. Mfraka Benebo Omoni (PDP)

Area
  - Land: 1,011 km^{2} (390 sq mi)

Population (2006)
  - Total: 249,773
  - Density: 247.1/km^{2} (639.9/sq mi)
- Time zone: UTC+1 (WAT)
- Postal code: 504
- Website: www.degemalocalgovernmentarea.com.ng

Degema is a town and LGA situated in Rivers State in the South South geo-political zone of Nigeria.

The population of Degema Local Government Area is estimated at 138,941 inhabitants with the majority of the people residing there being members of the Degema and Ijaw tribal divisions. In the early 19th century, after slave trade it was a major exporter of kernels and palm oil and it is located in an area of mangroves, tropical forests and swamps. The Ijaw and Degema dialects are widely spoken in the area while Christianity is the common religion practiced in the area. Degema is home to a number of festivals which includes the Agiri and Igugule festivals while the popular landmarks in the area includes the Degema General Hospital, Medium Security Custodial Center, Degema, Zonal Hospital Degema, RT Hon. Tonye E. Harry Stadium, A Comprehensive Health center. It has an area of 1,011 km^{2} and a population of 249,773 at the 2006 census.

The postal code of the area is 504. Degema shares border with Asari Toru to the North, Akuku-Toru to the west, Okrika and Bonny to the east, and a river to the south.

== Climate ==
Degema has a hot, humid climate that experiences uncomfortable weather all year round. The wet season is warm and cloudy. It rarely drops below 64 °F or rises beyond 90 °F throughout the year, usually fluctuating between 71 °F and 87 °F yearly.

== List of communities and towns in Degema LGA ==
The towns and villages that make up Degema LGA includes Degema, Bakana, Usokun-Degema, Ogurama, Tombia, Ke, Bille, Obuama and Bukuma.
