= Khana, Nigeria =

Khana Kana Kana
- LGA
- Motto: Ka-aleneBari
- Interactive map of Khana
- Location within Nigeria
- Coordinates: 4°42′N 7°21′E
- Country: Nigeria
- State: Rivers State
- Date created: 1992
- Seat: Bori

Government
  - Type: Local Government Council
  - Local Government Chairman: Martins Nwigbo (APP)
  - Deputy Local Government Chairman: Ibrahim Nugbenekpugi (PDP)
  - Local Government Council: Ward 1: Kpae Dumale James (PDP); Ward 2: Ika Meesua Daniel (PDP); Ward 3: Joseph Kaborloobari Joy (PDP); Ward 4: Nkana Lesor (PDP); Ward 5: Agbuzi Clinton Lekia (PDP); Ward 6: Teeh Bariledum (PDP); Ward 7: Nwazim Clever Barikui (PDP); Ward 8: Nordee Robinson Nule (PDP); Ward 9: Barigbome Amos (PDP); Ward 10: Sorle Ikolebabari (PDP); Ward 11: Baridakara Harrison (PDP); Ward 12: Suale Faith Tigiri (PDP); Ward 13: Ipia Prince Barisua (PDP); Ward 14: Gobari Deebom (PDP); Ward 15: Numdaere Micah Dickson (PDP); Ward 16: Barinee Monday Nwigbara (PDP); Ward 17: Emmanuel Barisi Mercy (PDP); Ward 18: Nyobah Neeka (PDP); Ward 19: Isaiah Waale Goodness (PDP)

Area
  - Total: 560 km^{2} (220 sq mi)

Population (2006)
  - Total: 294,217
  - Density: 530/km^{2} (1,400/sq mi)
- Time zone: UTC+1 (WAT)
- Postal code: 502101

Khana (audio) is a Local Government Area located in the South-East senatorial district of Rivers State, Nigeria. Its administrative seat is in the town of Bori.

It has an area of 560 km^{2} and a population estimated about 294,217 at the 2006 census. The local language is the Khana language. The main occupation of Khana people are fishing, hunting, and farming. They produce yam, cassava, palm oil, coco-yam etc. These agricultural products are sold in the market to vendors who resale it at the city market of porthatcout and other markets in Rivers State and Akwaibom State.

The postal code of the area is 504. Khana is part of the Ogoni tribe

== Climate/Geography ==
Khana LGA has an average annual temperature of 25 degrees Celsius or 77 degrees Fahrenheit and a total area of 560 square kilometres or 220 square miles. Numerous rivers and their tributaries flow through the region. It is estimated that Khana LGA receives 2900 mm of precipitation annually.
