= Oyigbo =

Oyigbo Obigbo
- Town and LGA
- Interactive map of Oyigbo
- Location within Nigeria Location within Africa
- Coordinates: 4°52′41″N 7°07′42″E
- Country: Nigeria
- State: Rivers State
- Date created: 1991
- Seat: Afam

Government
  - Local Government Chairman: Nwaogu Akara (PDP)
  - Deputy Local Government Chairman: Juliana Ngozi Okorie (PDP)
  - Local Government Council: Ward 1: Kenneth Ogbuokwe (PDP); Ward 2: Nwogu Ihejika (PDP); Ward 3: Kenneth Enyeribeokere (PDP); Ward 4: Ekeke L. Nkemjika (PDP); Ward 5: Rejoice Nwankwo (PDP); Ward 6: John Chinedu Moses (PDP); Ward 7: Mrs Adele Goodness Nneoma (PDP); Ward 8: Felix Nwogu (PDP); Ward 9: Oyegorom G. Chukwudi (PDP); Ward 10: Amache Nwakanma (PDP)
- Time zone: UTC+1 (WAT)
- National language: Igbo

Oyigbo (called Obigbo by locals) is a town and Local Government Area located in Rivers State, Nigeria. It is a town, 30 kilometres (19 miles) from the Port city of Port Harcourt, 25 km from the city of Aba.

Sir Precious Oforji was elected Chairman of the Oyigbo LGA in 2008. EZE Mike Nwaji was enthroned as the crowned traditional king of Obigbo in 1998. The towns and villages in Oyigbo Local Government area include : Obigbo district; Asa, Komkom, Obeama, Oyigbo, while for the Ndoki district they include Afa Uku, Afam, Afam Nta, Azusogu, Egberu, Mgboji, Mrihu, Obeakpu, Obeta, Obumku, Okoloma, Okponta, Umuagbai, Umuosi.

Owing to the geographical location of Obigbo, there was a contention between the neighboring States, Rivers State and Abia State as to which of the States should rightfully own the Obigbo Local Government Area. After several deliberations between the two States involved, there was an agreement that Obigbo should remain as a part of Rivers State.

== Oil and gas exploration ==
Shell Petroleum Development Company (SPDC) operates an oil well in the LGA. Eastern Network Gas Pipeline (Alscon pipeline) passes through Oyigbo in the north. Nigerian National Petroleum Corporation, NNPC and the Rivers State Government under Gov. Rotimi Chibuike Amaechi pledged to work together to restore production activities at the Shell Petroleum Development Company, SPDC operated at Oyigbo Gas Plant. On November 1, 2013, citing considerable health and safety risk to people, Shell Petroleum Development Company of Nigeria Ltd (SPDC), JV shut down Oyigbo gas plant over encroachment on the right-of-way of gas pipelines.

On June 28, 2015, SPDC JV's announced that its Afam VI located in Okoloma village of Obigbo had delivered 20 million MWh of electricity into the national grid and created over 150 jobs.

== Economy ==
Obigbo LGA is rich in deposits of crude oil and natural gas with several oil mining corporations operating in the area which contribute to the economy.

Other notable economic activities in Obigbo LGA include farming, trade, and crafts making.

Obigbo accommodates a number of businesses in her locality. A good number of establishments owned by individuals and government can be found in Obigbo. These establishments include but are not limited to hotels, industries, commercial shops, among others.

== Climate/Geography ==
The average temperature of Oyigbo LGA is 25 degrees Celsius or 77 degrees Fahrenheit, and the region is home to numerous rivers and tributaries. According to estimates, the LGA has an average humidity level of 79% and an average wind speed of 12 km/h.
