= 2023 Nigerian presidential election in Rivers State =

- 25 February 2023
- Registered: 3,537,190
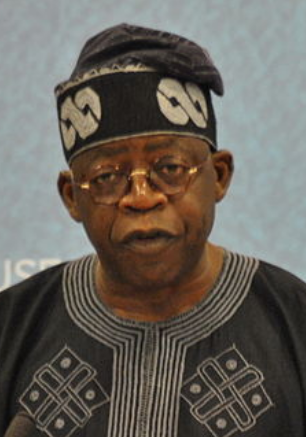

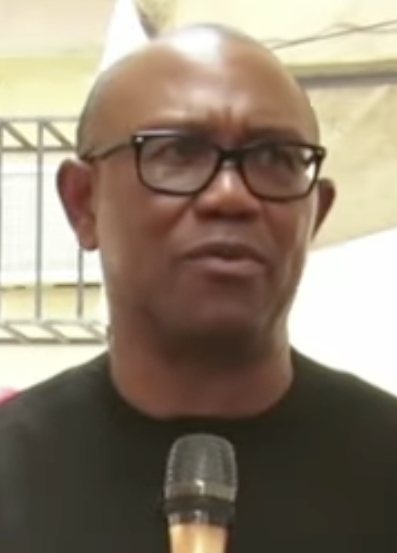

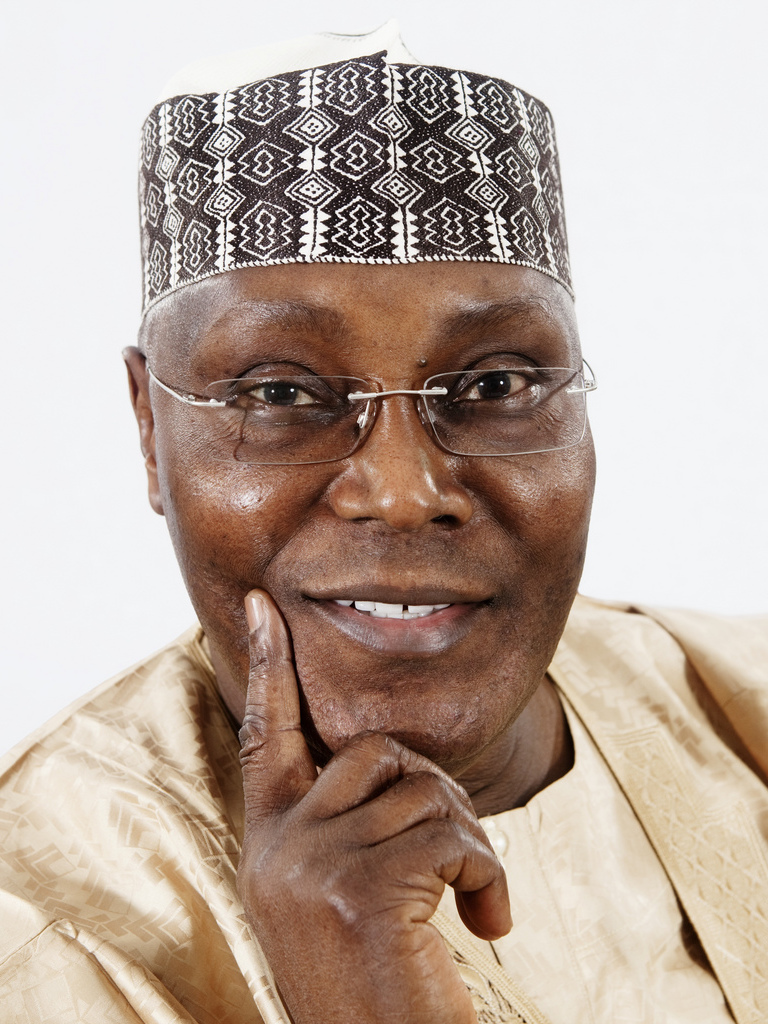
| Nominee | Bola Tinubu | Peter Obi |
| Party | APC | LP |
| Home state | Lagos | Anambra |
| Running mate | Kashim Shettima | Yusuf Datti Baba-Ahmed |
| Nominee | Rabiu Kwankwaso | Atiku Abubakar |
| Party | New Nigeria Peoples Party | PDP |
| Home state | Kano | Adamawa |
| Running mate | Isaac Idahosa | Ifeanyi Okowa |
President before election
Muhammadu Buhari
APC
Elected President
TBD

The 2023 Nigerian presidential election in Rivers State will be held on 25 February 2023 as part of the nationwide 2023 Nigerian presidential election to elect the president and vice president of Nigeria. Other federal elections, including elections to the House of Representatives and the Senate, will also be held on the same date while state elections will be held two weeks afterward on 11 March.

== Background ==
Rivers State is a highly populated, diverse state in the South South with major oil and natural gas reserves along with industrial centres. Despite its vast oil revenues, the state has several major issues with pirates and illegal oil bunkering gangs in riverine areas while urban areas have overcrowding and intense environmental pollution.

The 2019 Rivers elections were a continuation of the state PDP's control as the state APC's inability to hold valid primaries led to its disqualification by a court. PDP presidential nominee Atiku Abubakar won the state by 50% and the party gained all three senate seats while also sweeping the House of Representatives elections. On the state level, the PDP also retained its House of Assembly majority and incumbent Governor Nyesom Wike won the gubernatorial election by a wide margin.

== Polling ==
| Polling organisation/client | Fieldwork date | Sample size | | | | | Others | Undecided | Undisclosed | Not voting |
| Polling organisation/client | Fieldwork date | Sample size | Tinubu APC | Obi LP | Kwankwaso NNPP | Abubakar PDP | Others | Undecided | Undisclosed | Not voting |
|---|---|---|---|---|---|---|---|---|---|---|
| BantuPage | December 2022 | N/A | 2% | 88% | 2% | 3% | – | 2% | 2% | 0% |
| Nextier (Rivers crosstabs of national poll) | 27 January 2023 | N/A | 7.7% | 77.8% | 0.9% | 11.1% | – | 2.6% | – | – |
| SBM Intelligence for EiE (Rivers crosstabs of national poll) | 22 January-6 February 2023 | N/A | 9% | 65% | 1% | 18% | 6% | 2% | – | – |

== Projections ==
| Source | Projection | | As of |
|---|---|---|---|
| Africa Elects (Note: Africa Elects projections predict the likelihood of a candidate winning a state by categorizing a state as "Safe" for exceedingly likely, "Likely" for somewhat likely, and "Lean" for least likely. If no clear determination could be made, states are categorized as "tossups".) | Likely Obi | | 24 February 2023 |
Dataphyte (Note: Dataphyte projections predict candidates' projected votal shares in each state.)
| Dataphyte | Tinubu: | 14.49% | 11 February 2023 |
| Dataphyte | Obi: | 62.46% | 11 February 2023 |
| Dataphyte | Abubakar: | 19.27% | 11 February 2023 |
| Dataphyte | Others: | 3.83% | 11 February 2023 |
| Enough is Enough- SBM Intelligence (Note: EiE-SBM projections predict which candidates will win states.) | Obi | | 17 February 2023 |
| SBM Intelligence (Note: SBM projections predict which candidates will win states or, if no determination could be made, categorizes states as "Too close to call" (TCC).) | Abubakar | | 15 December 2022 |
ThisDay (Note: ThisDay projections predict candidates' projected votal shares in each state.)
| ThisDay | Tinubu: | 10% | 27 December 2022 |
| ThisDay | Obi: | 35% | 27 December 2022 |
| ThisDay | Kwankwaso: | – | 27 December 2022 |
| ThisDay | Abubakar: | 15% | 27 December 2022 |
| ThisDay | Others/Undecided: | 40% | 27 December 2022 |
| The Nation (Note: The Nation projections predict which candidates will win states or, if no determination could be made, categorizes states as "Battlegrounds.") | Battleground | | 12-19 February 2023 |

== General election ==
=== Results ===
2023 Nigerian presidential election in Rivers State
| Party | Candidate | Votes | % |
|---|---|---|---|
| A | Christopher Imumolen | | |
| AA | Hamza al-Mustapha | | |
| ADP | Yabagi Sani | | |
| APP | Osita Nnadi | | |
| AAC | Omoyele Sowore | | |
| ADC | Dumebi Kachikwu | | |
| APC | Bola Tinubu | | |
| APGA | Peter Umeadi | | |
| APM | Princess Chichi Ojei | | |
| BP | Sunday Adenuga | | |
| LP | Peter Obi | | |
| NRM | Felix Johnson Osakwe | | |
| New Nigeria Peoples Party | Rabiu Kwankwaso | | |
| PRP | Kola Abiola | | |
| PDP | Atiku Abubakar | | |
| SDP | Adewole Adebayo | | |
| YPP | Malik Ado-Ibrahim | | |
| ZLP | Dan Nwanyanwu | | |
| Total votes | | | 100.00% |
| Invalid or blank votes | | | N/A |
| Turnout | | | |

==== By senatorial district ====
The results of the election by senatorial district.

| Senatorial District | Bola Tinubu APC | | Atiku Abubakar PDP | | Peter Obi LP | | Rabiu Kwankwaso NNPP | | Others | | Total valid votes |
| Senatorial District | Votes | % | Votes | % | Votes | % | Votes | % | Votes | % | Total valid votes |
|---|---|---|---|---|---|---|---|---|---|---|---|
| Rivers East Senatorial District (Note: Comprising the local government areas of Emohua, Etche, Ikwerre, Obio-Akpor, Ogu–Bolo, Okrika, Omuma, and Port Harcourt.) | TBD | % | TBD | % | TBD | % | TBD | % | TBD | % | TBD |
| Rivers South East Senatorial District (Note: Comprising the local government areas of Andoni, Eleme, Gokana, Khana, Opobo–Nkoro, Oyigbo, and Tai.) | TBD | % | TBD | % | TBD | % | TBD | % | TBD | % | TBD |
| Rivers West Senatorial District (Note: Comprising the local government areas of Abua–Odual, Ahoada East, Ahoada West, Akuku-Toru, Asari-Toru, Bonny, Degema, and Ogba–Egbema–Ndoni.) | TBD | % | TBD | % | TBD | % | TBD | % | TBD | % | TBD |
| Totals | TBD | % | TBD | % | TBD | % | TBD | % | TBD | % | TBD |

==== By federal constituency ====
The results of the election by federal constituency.

| Federal Constituency | Bola Tinubu APC | | Atiku Abubakar PDP | | Peter Obi LP | | Rabiu Kwankwaso NNPP | | Others | | Total valid votes |
| Federal Constituency | Votes | % | Votes | % | Votes | % | Votes | % | Votes | % | Total valid votes |
|---|---|---|---|---|---|---|---|---|---|---|---|
| Abua/Odua/Ahoada East Federal Constituency (Note: Comprising the local government areas of Abua–Odual and Ahoada East.) | TBD | % | TBD | % | TBD | % | TBD | % | TBD | % | TBD |
| Ahoada West/Ogba/Egbema/Ndoni Federal Constituency (Note: Comprising the local government areas of Ahoada East and Ogba–Egbema–Ndoni.) | TBD | % | TBD | % | TBD | % | TBD | % | TBD | % | TBD |
| Akuku Toru/Asari Toru Federal Constituency (Note: Comprising the local government areas of Akuku-Toru and Asari-Toru.) | TBD | % | TBD | % | TBD | % | TBD | % | TBD | % | TBD |
| Andoni/Opobo/Nkoro Federal Constituency (Note: Comprising the local government areas of Andoni and Opobo–Nkoro.) | TBD | % | TBD | % | TBD | % | TBD | % | TBD | % | TBD |
| Degema/Bonny Federal Constituency (Note: Comprising the local government areas of Bonny and Degema.) | TBD | % | TBD | % | TBD | % | TBD | % | TBD | % | TBD |
| Eleme/Oyigbo/Tai Federal Constituency (Note: Comprising the local government areas of Eleme, Oyigbo, and Tai.) | TBD | % | TBD | % | TBD | % | TBD | % | TBD | % | TBD |
| Etche/Omuma Federal Constituency (Note: Comprising the local government areas of Etche and Omuma.) | TBD | % | TBD | % | TBD | % | TBD | % | TBD | % | TBD |
| Ikwerre/Emohua Federal Constituency (Note: Comprising the local government areas of Emohua and Ikwerre.) | TBD | % | TBD | % | TBD | % | TBD | % | TBD | % | TBD |
| Khana/Gokana Federal Constituency (Note: Comprising the local government areas of Gokana and Khana.) | TBD | % | TBD | % | TBD | % | TBD | % | TBD | % | TBD |
| Obio/Akpor Federal Constituency (Note: Comprising the local government area of Obio-Akpor.) | TBD | % | TBD | % | TBD | % | TBD | % | TBD | % | TBD |
| Okrika/Ogu/Bolo Federal Constituency (Note: Comprising the local government areas of Ogu–Bolo and Okrika.) | TBD | % | TBD | % | TBD | % | TBD | % | TBD | % | TBD |
| Port Harcourt I Federal Constituency and Port Harcourt II Federal Constituency (Note: Together comprising the local government area of Port Harcourt.) (Note: These two constituencies are within a single LGA. As this table does not differentiate between intra-LGA results, these figures are for the entire LGA which is the same as the data for both constituencies.) | TBD | % | TBD | % | TBD | % | TBD | % | TBD | % | TBD |
| Totals | TBD | % | TBD | % | TBD | % | TBD | % | TBD | % | TBD |

==== By local government area ====
The results of the election by local government area.

| Local government area | Bola Tinubu APC | | Atiku Abubakar PDP | | Peter Obi LP | | Rabiu Kwankwaso NNPP | | Others | | Total valid votes | Turnout (%) |
| Local government area | Votes | % | Votes | % | Votes | % | Votes | % | Votes | % | Total valid votes | Turnout (%) |
|---|---|---|---|---|---|---|---|---|---|---|---|---|
| Abua–Odual | TBD | % | TBD | % | TBD | % | TBD | % | TBD | % | TBD | % |
| Ahoada East | TBD | % | TBD | % | TBD | % | TBD | % | TBD | % | TBD | % |
| Ahoada West | TBD | % | TBD | % | TBD | % | TBD | % | TBD | % | TBD | % |
| Akuku-Toru | TBD | % | TBD | % | TBD | % | TBD | % | TBD | % | TBD | % |
| Andoni | TBD | % | TBD | % | TBD | % | TBD | % | TBD | % | TBD | % |
| Asari-Toru | TBD | % | TBD | % | TBD | % | TBD | % | TBD | % | TBD | % |
| Bonny | TBD | % | TBD | % | TBD | % | TBD | % | TBD | % | TBD | % |
| Degema | TBD | % | TBD | % | TBD | % | TBD | % | TBD | % | TBD | % |
| Eleme | TBD | % | TBD | % | TBD | % | TBD | % | TBD | % | TBD | % |
| Emohua | TBD | % | TBD | % | TBD | % | TBD | % | TBD | % | TBD | % |
| Etche | TBD | % | TBD | % | TBD | % | TBD | % | TBD | % | TBD | % |
| Gokana | TBD | % | TBD | % | TBD | % | TBD | % | TBD | % | TBD | % |
| Ikwerre | TBD | % | TBD | % | TBD | % | TBD | % | TBD | % | TBD | % |
| Khana | TBD | % | TBD | % | TBD | % | TBD | % | TBD | % | TBD | % |
| Obio-Akpor | TBD | % | TBD | % | TBD | % | TBD | % | TBD | % | TBD | % |
| Ogba–Egbema–Ndoni | TBD | % | TBD | % | TBD | % | TBD | % | TBD | % | TBD | % |
| Ogu–Bolo | TBD | % | TBD | % | TBD | % | TBD | % | TBD | % | TBD | % |
| Okrika | TBD | % | TBD | % | TBD | % | TBD | % | TBD | % | TBD | % |
| Omuma | TBD | % | TBD | % | TBD | % | TBD | % | TBD | % | TBD | % |
| Opobo–Nkoro | TBD | % | TBD | % | TBD | % | TBD | % | TBD | % | TBD | % |
| Oyigbo | TBD | % | TBD | % | TBD | % | TBD | % | TBD | % | TBD | % |
| Port Harcourt | TBD | % | TBD | % | TBD | % | TBD | % | TBD | % | TBD | % |
| Tai | TBD | % | TBD | % | TBD | % | TBD | % | TBD | % | TBD | % |
| Totals | TBD | % | TBD | % | TBD | % | TBD | % | TBD | % | TBD | % |

== See also ==
- 2023 Rivers State elections
- 2023 Nigerian presidential election
