= Ahoada =

City in Orashi, Rivers State, Nigeria

Ahoada Ehuda
- Interactive map of Ahoada
- Coordinates: 5°05′N 6°39′E
- Country: Nigeria
- State: Rivers State
- LGAs: Ahoada East; Ahoada West

Ahoada (Ehuda) is a city in Orashi Region of Rivers State, Nigeria, located northwest of Port Harcourt. In Ahoada, the Ekpeye language is majorly spoken, though there are other languages in Ahoada like: Engenni, Ogba, and Ikwerre. In Ahoada it is only Ekpeye language and it's variation that is mostly spoken.

Ahoada is divided into two local government areas; the Ahoada East, with its headquarters in Ahoada city, and Ahoada West having its headquarters at Akinima administratively. It has been the administrative headquarters of Old Ahoada division in the pre-independence era with Ogba, Egbema, Engenni, Abua-Odual, Etche, Omuma, Obio-Akpor, Ikwerre and some area within Port Harcourt. According to the National Population Commission Census (NPCC) in 2006, the population in Ahoada was 583,900 that is; 233,700 for Ahoada East and 350,200 for Ahoada West and projected to be 700,680 in 2018.

== Economy ==
The topography and its environment is favourable for agricultural activities since there is adequate rainfall within the year, this made the inhabitants of Ahoada base majorly on fishing and farming. The indigenes of Ahoada were predominantly farmers and fishermen and presently even through the petroleum exploitations in its region.

Rivers State University of Science and Technology (RSUST) has a campus known as satellite campus in Ahoada. And other places the RSUST campuses were built include, Etche and Emohua. According to the Vice Chancellor of Rivers State University of Science and Technology (RSUST), Prof. Nlerum Sunday Okogbule (as at the year 2021) the campus built in Ahoada is intended to boost the social and economic activities and as well help to improve the development of the host community and neighbouring communities.

== Geography ==
Its latitude 5° 4' 58" N, Longitude 6° 38' 59" E and both Latitude and Longitude 5.0828, 6.64981. Its climate type is a tropical monsoon climate.

== List of towns and villages ==
- Abarikpo
- Agbo/ Akogbologba
- Ahoada
- Akalamini
- Akinima
- Akol
- Anakpo
- Anwunugbokor
- Ebiriba/ Ikodu
- Ebiro
- Edeeha
- Edeoha
- Edugbari
- Ekpena
- Emezi
- Idoke
- Idu-Obosiuku
- Idu- Osobile
- Igbuduya
- Igoria
- Ihuaba
- Ihuechi
- Ihugbogo
- Ihubuluko
- Ihuowo
- Ihuaje
- Ikata
- Mbiama
- Oboh
- Odido
- Ogbo
- Odhiaje
- Uyakama
- Ubeta
- Ubarama
- UDEBU
- Ula-Upata
- Upatabo
