= Igbo yam festivals =

Annual Igbo cultural festival

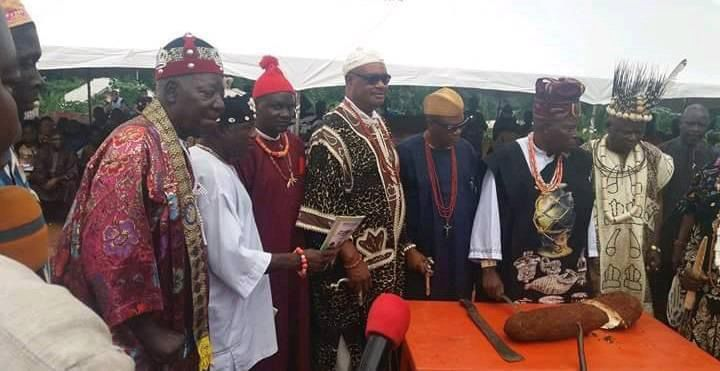
Igbo new yam festival (Ịrị ji ọhụrụ)

Igbo Yam Festivals (Igbo: Iri ji, Iwa ji, Iri ji Ọhụrụ, Ike ji, or Otute) refers to the multiple annual cultural festival by the Igbo people, held at the end of the rainy season in early August to mark the first harvest of yams and to offer thanksgiving for a successful agricultural year.

Yam (ji) holds a central place in traditional Igbo society as the most important staple crop. A longstanding customary prohibition forbids the consumption of newly harvested yams until the formal ritual has been performed by the appropriate community authority. The festival expresses gratitude to the earth deity Ala, the yam spirit (Ahiajoku / Ifejioku / Njoku ji), the ancestors, and the supreme being, while renewing the agricultural and social cycle.

== Names and local variants ==
Common designations include Iri Ji or Iri Ji Ọhụrụ ("eating the new yam"), Iwa Ji ("breaking/cutting the yam"), and Ike Ji. In some communities the festival is closely associated with the name of the yam deity itself (Ahiajoku or Ifejioku). Regional forms such as Afiaolu (Nnewi) also occur..

== Igbo tradition and importance of yam ==
Igbo people were widely regarded as highly skilled and productive farmers in West Africa, with yam cultivation forming the core of their agrarian economy and cultural identity. Contemporary observers recorded the careful attention and technical skill they applied to the crop. The botanist and ethnographer D. G. Coursey described the Igbo as “the most enthusiastic yam cultivators in the world,” while the missionary ethnographer Basden noted how yam is the equivalent for Igbo people how "potato does for the typical Irishman” and that a shortage of the crop caused genuine distress.

Yams are among the first set of crops to be planted at the beginning of the planting season. Between April and August, early crops such as maize, cocoyams, and pumpkins are harvested and eaten without fanfare. The New Yam Festival is, therefore, a celebration depicting the prominence of yam in the social-cultural life of the Igbo people. In some Igbo communities, all old yams (from the previous year's crop) must be consumed or discarded on the eve of the New Yam Festival. The next day, only dishes of yam are served at the feast, as the festival is symbolic of the abundance of the produce.

Though the style and methods may differ from one community to the next, the essential components that make up the festival remain the same. In some communities, the celebration lasts a whole day, while in many places it may last a week or more. These festivities normally include a variety of entertainments and ceremonies, including the performance of rites by the Igwe (King), or the eldest man, and cultural dances by Igbo men, women, and their children. The festival features Igbo cultural activities in the form of contemporary shows, masquerade dances, and fashion parades.

== Oba-Ji (Yam barn) ==
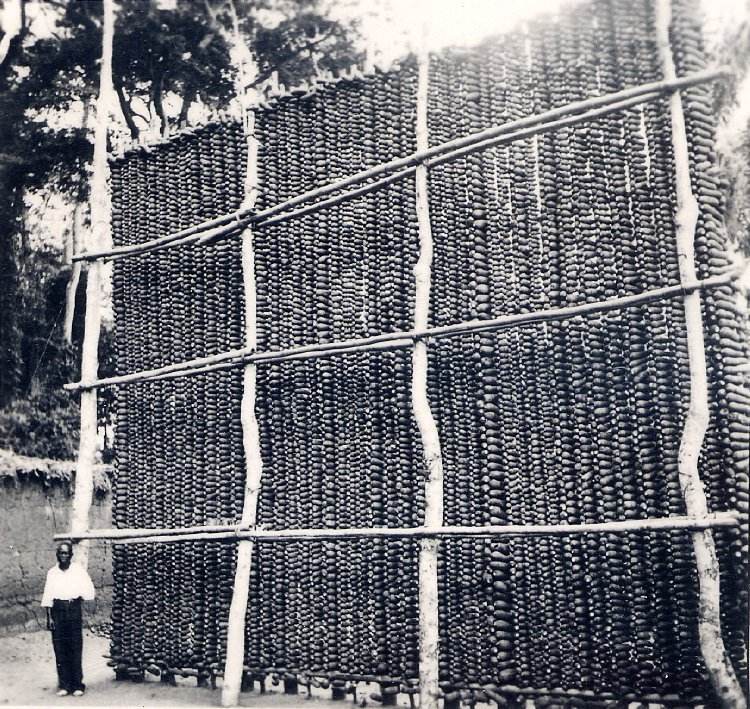
Igbo man with yam tied in an Igbo Yam barn . J. Stöcker 1880-1939

The Igbo yam barn (ọba ji) is a traditional structure used by Igbo farmers to store and preserve harvested yams. Yams were a major staple and an important agricultural crop in Igbo society, making their proper storage essential for maintaining the harvest over long periods. The open, elevated design of the barn allows air to circulate around the tubers, helping protect them from moisture, rot, pests, and excessive sprouting. Yam was regarded as the most important crop in traditional Igbo economy and culture, igbos were primarily agriculturalist. A man’s ability to fill a large Öba Ji demonstrated industry, foresight, and success as a farmer. The number of yams stored influenced a man’s capacity to marry additional wives, take titles, meet social obligations, and command respect. The typical ọba ji consists of a framework of vertical living or fixed posts (often living sticks that continue to grow and provide shade) with horizontal poles or bamboo supports. Individual yam tubers are tied in rows to the framework with ropes, usually of raffia or other local fibre. The open design allows free air circulation, which helps prevent rotting and excessive sprouting while protecting the tubers from ground pests and excessive soil moisture.

== Ịwa-jị ceremony ==
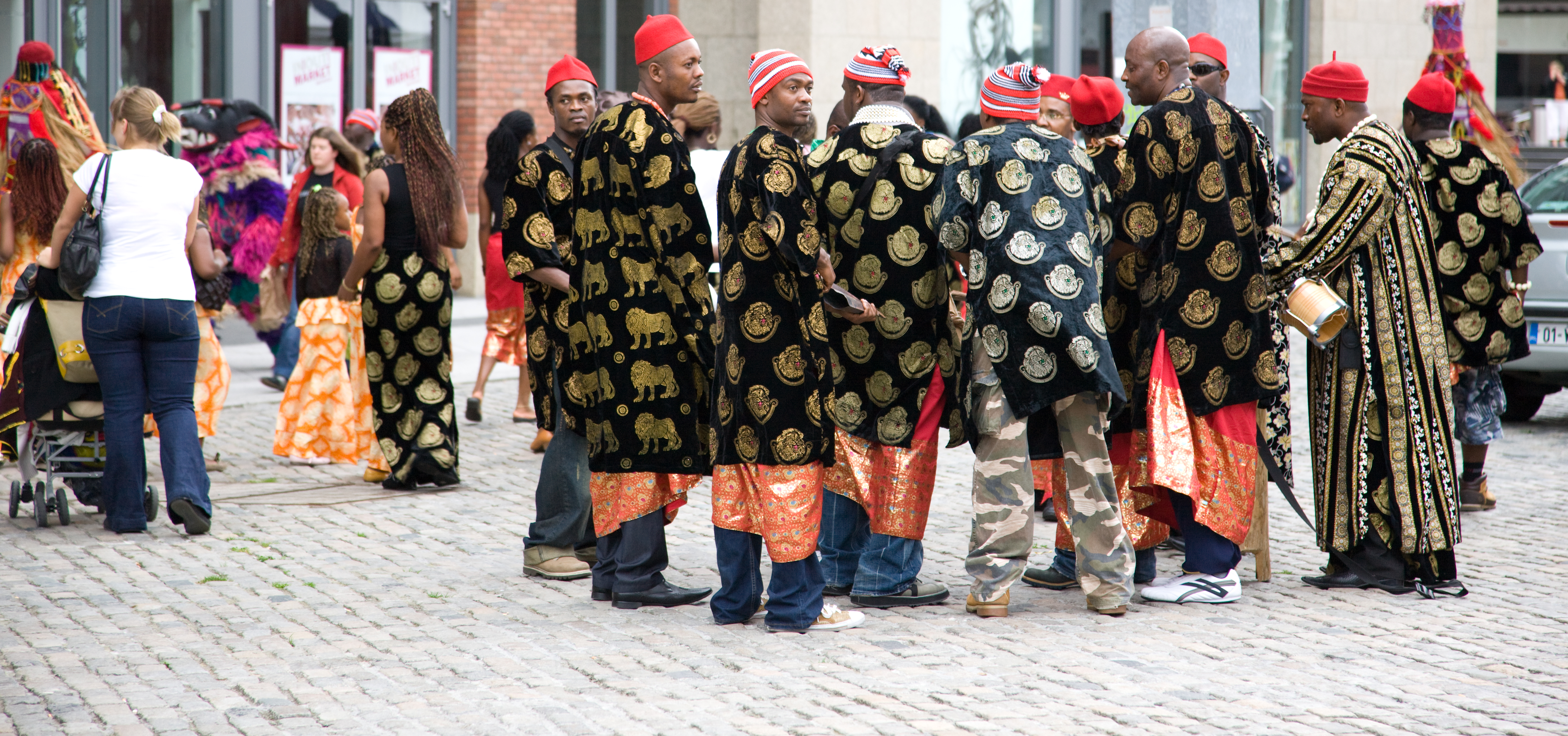
The Igbo New Yam Festival Dublin, Ireland

Usually, at the beginning of the festival, the yams are offered to the gods and ancestors first before distributing them to the villagers. The ritual is performed either by the oldest man in the community or by the king or eminent titleholder. This man also offers the yams to god, deities, and ancestors by showing gratitude to the supreme deity for his protection and kindness in leading them from lean periods to the time of bountiful harvest without deaths resulting from hunger. After the prayer of thanksgiving to their god, they eat the first yam because It is believed that their position bestows the privilege of being intermediaries between their communities and the gods of the land. The rituals are meant to express the gratitude of the community to the gods for making the harvest possible, and they are widely followed despite more modern changes due to the influence of Christianity in the area. This, therefore, explains the three aspects of the Igbo worldview, that they are pragmatic, religious, and appreciative.

The day is symbolic of enjoyment after the cultivation season, and the plenty is shared with friends and well-wishers. A variety of festivities mark the eating of new yam. Folk dances, masquerades, parades, and parties create an artistic experience; the colorful festival is a spectacle of exhibited joy, thanks, and community display.

The yam used for the main ritual at the festival is usually roasted and served with palm oil (mmanụ nri). Ịwa jị also shares some similarities with the Asian Mid-Autumn Festival, as both are based on the cycles of the moon and are essentially community harvest festivals.

This event is important in the calendar of Igbo people all over the world.

The harvest of yam and the celebration of the gods of the land through the New Yam festival is an epitome of the people's religious belief in the supreme deity. The coming of the new moon in August marks the preparation for the great "Iri Ji Ohu" festival, but the time and mode of preparation differs from community to community.

The New Yam festival is an art event. The festival is a visual spectacle of coherence, of dance, of joy and feasting, an annual display for community members, to mark the end of the cultivation season, a festival where the people express their gratitude to those that helped them reap a bountiful harvest.

Ntezi is one of the Koring speaking communities in Ebonyi state, southeast Nigeria.

== See also ==
- For the 1963 Fluxus Yam Festival see Fluxus
- Ikeji festival
- Ito Ogbo Festival
- Ogwu Ekpeye
