= Isu people =

Ethnic subgroup in Nigeria

Isu
Isuama

Total population
- 3 million

Regions with significant populations
- Nigeria

Languages
- Isu language, English

Religion
- Christianity 81%; Odinala 19%

Related ethnic groups
- Aguata, Aguleri, Arochukwu, Awka, Bende, Edda, Egbema, Ekpeye, Enuani, Etche, Ezza, Ibeku, Idemili, Igbanke, Ika, Ikwerre, Isobo, Ikwo, Izzi, Mbaise, Ndoki, Ngbo, Ngwa, Nkanu, Nnewi, Nsukka, Onitsha, Ogbaru, Ogba, Ohafia, Ohuhu, Okigwe, Owerri, Ukwuani, Waawa

The Isu people// are the largest group of the Igbo people of Nigeria. Isuama, in which the purest Igbo is said to be spoken, is to be found the heart of the Igbo nationality; consequently it is quite reasonable to look among its people for the original fountain-head from which all the other clans have sprung. This inference too is supported not only by the purity of the language, but by this right of dispensing or rather of confer-ring royalty which is undoubtedly the prerogative of the Nri or N'shi people. In the pre-colonial era, the Igbo people were protected from external invasion by the dense forests of the region, which also encouraged diversity. Thus as warriors the neighboring Oratta (Uratta) people (Owerri people) looked down on the Isu people, who were traders.

Isuama is the name given to the south-central part of Igboland, which was a major source of slaves during the period of the trans-Atlantic slave trade. The name has been carried across the Atlantic, where it is found in the name of Cuban society Carabali Isuama. This name pays homage to the group's ancestry in the Isuama area of Igboland to the north of the Kalabari Ijaw people. At one time the Isuama language was spoken in Cuba, but eventually it and other Cross River languages was displaced by the standard Abakua language called Brikamo.

There are the Isu of Isu-Ikwu-atọ, in Abia State comprising Imenyi, Amawụ and Oguduasaa, each with its own towns and villages. Isuikwuatọ is a local government in Abia State with headquarters at Mbalanọ. Eze Ezo Ukandu, the Enyi na Ọbịangwụ of Imenyi was the head of all the traditional rulers in Isuikwuatọ until his death in January 2024.

There's also Isuochi, in Nneocho local government of Abia Another Isu of note is Isu-Njaba in Imo State.

- Isu: In Isu, Imo State (The biggest of all the settlements).
- Isu Njaba: In Njaba, Imo State.
- Isuochi: in Umunneochi, Abia State
- Abor Isu: In Isiala Mbano, Imo State.
- Isu Achara: In Onicha, Ebonyi State.
- Isu Aba: In Arochukwu, Abia State.
- Afor Mgbaleze-Isu: In Onicha, Ebonyi State.
- Isu Agbabor: In Onicha, Ebonyi State.
- Agbaja Isu: In Nwangele, Imo State.
- Umuozu Isu: In Nwangele, Imo State.
- Isu Osuama: In Isiala Mbano, Imo State.
- Isu Amawu: In Isuikwuato, Abia State.
- Isu Amachi: In Arochukwu, Abia State.
- Isu Awaa: In Awgu, Enugu State.
- Isu Ofia: In Aguata, Anambra State.
- Isu Ulo: In Orumba South, Anambra State.
- Isu Owu: In Ozuzu, In Etche, Rivers State.
- Isu Ikem: In Isi-Uzo, Enugu State.
- Isu Okpu: In Aguata, Anambra State.

As of September 2010 the traditional ruler of Amandugba, in the north of Isu Local Government Area of Imo State was Eze Innocent Ikejiofor. That month he asked his kinsmen in the United States to support the reelection bid of Governor Ikedi Ohakim in the elections due in April 2011. The Isuama people inhabits the Isu, Njaba, Nkwere, Orlu, Orsu, Oru East, Oru West, Ideato North, Ideato South, Nwangele Local Government Area of Imo State and Ihiala Local Government Area of Anambra State. The Nwangele local government communities holds the annual Igba-nta celebration, a tourist attraction.

== Largest settlements in Eastern Nigeria ==
- Isu: In Isu, Imo State (The biggest of all the settlements).
- Isu Njaba: In Njaba, Imo State.
- Isuochi: in Umunneochi, Abia State
- Abor Isu: In Isiala Mbano, Imo State.
- Isu Achara: In Onicha, Ebonyi State.
- Isu Aba: In Arochukwu, Abia State.
- Afor Mgbaleze-Isu: In Onicha, Ebonyi State.
- Isu Agbabor: In Onicha, Ebonyi State.
- Agbaja Isu: In Nwangele, Imo State.
- Umuozu Isu: In Nwangele, Imo State.
- Isu Osuama: In Isiala Mbano, Imo State.
- Isu Amawu: In Isuikwuato, Abia State.
- Isu Amachi: In Arochukwu, Abia State.
- Isu Awaa: In Awgu, Enugu State.
- Isu Ofia: In Aguata, Anambra State.
- Isu Ulo: In Orumba South, Anambra State.
- Isu Owu: In Ozuzu, In Etche, Rivers State.
- Isu Ikem: In Isi-Uzo, Enugu State.
- Isu Okpu: In Aguata, Anambra State.
