= Ogba =

Ogba may refer to:

- Ogba people
- Ogba language
