= Robinson O. Robinson =

Eze Ekpeye Logbo II (1979–2019)

Eze Robinson O. Robinson
- His Royal Majesty

Paramount ruler of Ekpeye Kingdom
- In office: November 1979 – 29 January 2019
- Predecessor: Eze Edmund Unoshi Ashirim
- Successor: Eze Kevin Ngozi Anugwo
- Born: March 13, 1940; Ahoada, Southern Region, British Nigeria (now Ahoada, Rivers State, Nigeria)
- Died: 29 January 2019 (aged 78)
- Burial: Odiereke-Ubie palace, Ahoada, Rivers State, Nigeria
- Spouse: Felicia Funmilayo Robinson
- House: Ishikoloko of Odiereke-Ubie
- Religion: Christianity
- Occupation: • Military officer • Eze Ekpeye Logbo

Eze Robinson O. Robinson (13 March 1940 – 29 January 2019) was the second Eze Ekpeye Logbo (grand paramount ruler) of the Ekpeye Kingdom in Ahoada East and parts of Ahoada West, Rivers State, Nigeria. He was the first chairman of the Rivers State Council of Chiefs. After his demise, he was succeeded by Eze Kelvin N. Anugwo as Eze Ekpeye Logbo III in May 2022.

== Life and career ==
Robinson was born on 13 March 1940 at Odiereke-Ubie, Southern Region, Colonial Nigeria (now in Ahoada West, Rivers State, Nigeria) into a Christian home. He joined the Nigerian Army aged 16. In the army he served in the Reconnaissance Squadron, Kaduna, Lagos Garrison Organisation and Nigerian Army Ordinance Depot, Lagos. In 1966, he was transferred to the Nigerian Air Force, just two years after its formation. There, he served as the personal assistant to George T. Kurubo, the first indigenous Chief of Air Staff of Nigeria. He then became aide-de-camp to the Plateau State military governor, Dan Suleiman. He again served in the Nigerian Air Force Administrative School in Port Harcourt as a training instructor. In November 1979, he voluntarily retired from the Nigerian Air Force as a flight lieutenant.

== Personal life ==
In 1970, Robinson married Felicia Funmilayo, a 19-year-old Lagos-born Ekpeye lady while he was still in military service.

== Kingship ==
After the demise of the Eze Ekpeye Logbo I, Eze Edmund Unoshi Ashirim of Ihuaba in Upata kingdom (the Ekpeye kingdom consists of three constituent kingdoms) in 1977, a five-man committee was created to select the next king of Ekpeye from Ubie kingdom. The mantle fell on Robinson. In 1979, he accepted the call to ascend the throne of Ekpeye Kingdom as its paramount ruler, voluntarily retiring from active military service in the process and was enthroned as Eze Ekpeye Logbo II. In 1983, he was elected as the first chairman of the Rivers State Council of Traditional Rulers and Chiefs.

In 2013, he, alongside his council of chiefs laid curses on corrupt indigenes of Ekpeyeland who abuse the public trust invested on them.

== Awards ==
During his lifetime, Robinson was awarded by the Nigerian government with the Commander of the Order of the Niger (CON) honour.

== Demise ==
He died on 29 January 2019, after an ailment. He was buried at his palace in Obiereke-Ubie on 13 May 2019.

Robinson O. Robinson Ubie royal house Born: 13 March 1940 Died: 29 January 2019
Regnal titles
Preceded by Edmund Unoshi Ashirim	Eze Ekpeye Logbo; 1979–2019	Succeeded by Kevin Ngozi Anugwo
