= Ogbah =

Ogbah may be,

- Ogbah people
  - Ogbah language
- Emmanuel Ogbah
