= Amauju =

Community in Nigeria

- Autonomous community
- Interactive map of Amauju
- Country: Federal Republic of Nigeria
- State: Imo
- Local Government Area: Isu
- Senatorial Zone: Orlu
- Villages: List: Umunaa; Umuokwararo; Íshí Umulolo; Duruaku Umulolo; Umunwebele; Umuezealauko Umueleke; Umuizi Umujuka Umuchukwu

Government
  - Type: Autonomous community
- Time zone: UTC+1 (WAT)

Amauju is an autonomous community of Imo State in southeastern Nigeria. The town is part of Imo State's Isu Local Government Area, zoned to Orlu Senatorial Zone.

The people of Amauju are of the Nigerian Ibo ethnic group, and speak the Igbo language.
