= Igbo yam barn =

Oba-ji

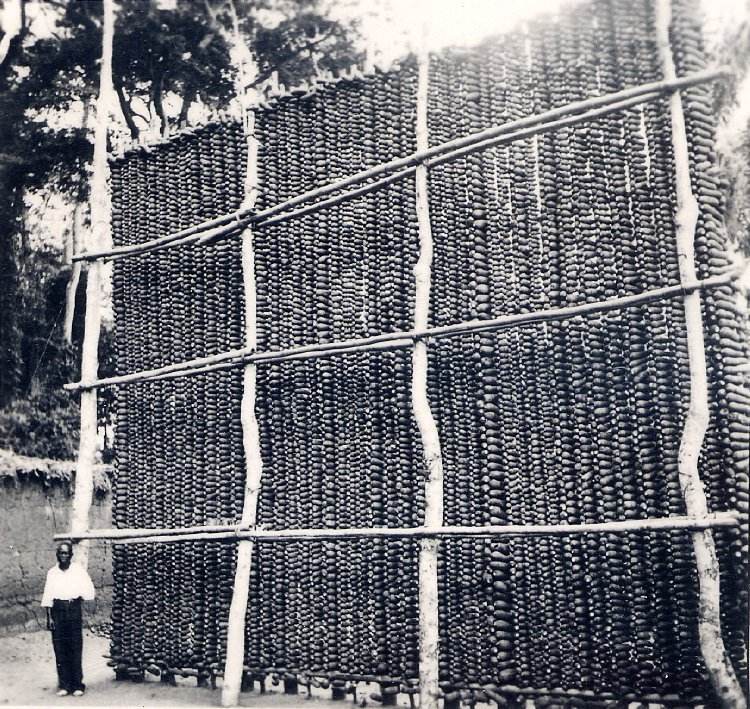
Igbo man with Yam barn (Oba Ji) 1880 - 1939

Igbo yam barn, (Igbo: Oba ji), is the traditional Igbo yam barn storage system, which is an open-air wooden structure used for storing harvested yams. Vertical posts and horizontal poles form a framework to which individual tubers are tied with rope, allowing air circulation that reduces rotting and pest damage while protecting the crop from ground moisture. The barn was ordinarily placed at the rear or side of a compound.

== Yam barns, material and procedure ==
Oba Ji were fenced, unroofed enclosures usually located on the outskirts of the village, towards the yam farm (ubi jị). They were commonly grouped in one shared area so they could be guarded when needed. These barns served as the key measure of a young farmer’s success: a man performed the Ike Oba (“barn-raising”) ceremony once he had produced enough eziji tubers to fill at least two full barns, roughly 3,000–4,000 yams when tied up. These barns are typically sited in shaded locations and built to promote good ventilation while shielding the tubers from flooding and insect damage. They consist of a vertical wooden framework to which individual tubers are attached; pairs of yams are commonly tied to each end of a rope and hung from horizontal poles set 1–2 m above the ground. Barns rarely exceed 4 m in height, though their length varies according to the volume of tubers and may extend 2 m or more. Ropes are usually made of fibrous material, or from raffia taken from the upper part of the palm-wine tree. Many farmers maintain permanent barns that require yearly upkeep at harvest time; in such cases living trees serve as the vertical posts and are periodically pruned of excess foliage. Palm fronds and the natural canopy of the trees themselves supply additional shade, protecting the tubers from intense solar heat and rain.

== Methods of storage ==
There are two common ways of storing yams in Igboland; the traditional yam barn system, or an underground storage system. A typical barn consists of three-meter vertical wooden poles spaced roughly 50 cm apart, frequently using oil-palm leaf midribs. These are stabilized by horizontal wooden crossbars and anchored by sturdy vertical logs driven into the soil. Farmers often use live, rooting posts for the main support logs, allowing the core frame to last for several years with only the vertical poles requiring annual replacement. Alternatively, farmers employ in-underground storage by leaving mature tubers in the soil until needed, though this technique remains effective only for a brief window before quality degrades.

Traditional yam barns in eastern Nigeria are designed as elevated, ventilated structures for storing harvested yam tubers. The barn consists of a vertical framework to which individual yam tubers are attached with twine. The framework is constructed from preferably living poles approximately 5–10 cm in diameter and spaced about 1 m apart, with the poles reaching approximately 6–7 m in height. Cross-members are commonly made from bamboo, raffia or palm-leaf midribs. Living plants incorporated into the structure provide shade, protecting the tubers from direct sunlight and helping to reduce the temperature within the storage space. Before storage, tubers are selected and graded according to size and cured for two to three days before being tied or placed on racks. The structures are generally temporary and may be reconstructed or repaired using locally available materials such as wood, bamboo, thatch and palm fronds. Yam storage can continue for approximately five to six months, during which the tubers are regularly inspected and sprouts removed when they appear. An improved form of the yam barn uses a more enclosed structure intended to provide greater protection against pests while maintaining ventilation. The improved barn described in the study has a corrugated-iron roof and steel-mesh walls, with openings large enough to permit aeration but sufficiently small to restrict rodents. Seed yams are stored on racks and in bins fitted with wire-gauze floors. Although the improved structure is described as more technically efficient than the traditional open barn, adequate aeration remains important because high ambient temperatures can occur during the dry-season period from January to March.

== Importance ==
The Igbo people were among the most skilled and productive farmers in West Africa, particularly in the cultivation of yam, which formed the foundation of their agrarian economy and identity. In traditional Igbo society the size of a man’s ọba ji was the primary indicator of wealth, agricultural competence, and social standing. Yam was the pre-eminent crop for Igbo people. The quantity of tubers a man could store determined his capacity to marry, take titles, meet social obligations, and command respect. Fathers frequently established their adult sons by providing seed yams and the means to start a first barn. Success in filling a barn was marked by formal rites, including Ike oba (the public tying of large numbers of yams, often several thousand) and igwa oba (barn sanctification). These ceremonies confirmed achievement and, in some communities, involved offerings linked to the yam deity (Njoku Ji / Ifejioku). A well-stocked barn was essential to full adult male status.

In certain traditional Igbo societies like Ohafia, a man’s social standing was closely tied to four major yam-related ceremonies that centred on the barn. The first was Ike Oba (Barn Raising), followed by Igwa Oba or Igwe Oba (Barn Sanctification), during which the Njoku Ji shrine was built and the largest edible yam from the harvest was placed upon it. Next came Igwa Nnu, the consecration of the first 400 yams, and finally Ime Okere Nkwa, a public drumming festival celebrating agricultural success. To stage the last of these, a farmer needed more than 2,800 yams. Although the use of traditional yam barns has declined, these structures remain innovative, especially for their time for their ability to keep tubers cool, well-ventilated and protected over long periods yams stored in modern underground structures retained roughly 55 % of tubers in good condition after five months, compared with under 20 % in traditional barns.

Early ethnographic observers noted the intensive care, technical proficiency, and cultural dedication they devoted to the crop. The botanist and ethnographer D. G. Coursey described Igbo people as “the most enthusiastic yam cultivators in the world” while the missionary ethnographer George Basden claimed yam is to Igbo people as potato is for the typical Irish man and that any shortage caused genuine distress, underscoring both the abundance they achieved through careful husbandry and the central place of farming in their society.

== See also ==
- Ito Ogbo Festival
