= EKP =

EKP may refer to:

- Communist Party of Estonia, 1920–1990 (Estonian: Eestimaa Kommunistlik Partei)
- Ekpeye language, spoken in Nigeria (ISO 636:ekp)
- European Central Bank, founded 1998 (Estonian and Finnish: EKP)
- Jewish Communist Party (Poalei Zion), 1919–1922 (Russian: Evreĭskaia kommunisticheskaia partiia)
