= Amandugba =

Town in Imo State, Nigeria

- Location within Nigeria
- Coordinates: 5°41′2″N 7°4′8″E
- Country: Nigeria
- State: Imo State
- LGA: Isu
- National language: Igbo

Amandugba,// also known as Amanduba or Amandugba Ancient Kingdom, is an autonomous kingdom in the Isu Local Government Area of Imo State, Nigeria. The community is predominantly inhabited by the Isu people, a subgroup of the Igbo ethnic group. The town derives its name from Ndugba, a prominent ancestral figure and founding father of the community.

== History and origin ==
Amandugba traces its origins to Ndugba, the son of Mbama Onyeukwu, who was a migrant farmer and warrior who settled in the region with his family. Ndugba established the town after discovering fertile land across the Okatankwu stream. His descendants formed the core lineages of present-day Amandugba, Ulo-ano Ndugba, Umundugba, and Ezisu Ndugba. Historically, Amandugba and neighboring Umundugba were part of a single settlement before administrative divisions. The community played a significant role in regional trade and governance during the pre-colonial and colonial eras, particularly under the leadership of warrant chiefs appointed by British colonial administrators.

== Governance and traditional institutions ==
Amandugba operates as an autonomous kingdom under a constitutional monarchy led by the Igwe (king). As of 2010, the town was ruled by HRH Eze Sir Innocent Obiajulu Udenwa Ikejiofor Nwigwe, a descendant of the Nwigwe Nwaneku lineage, who have been serving the community for well over a century. The Nwigwe Nwaneku royal lineage began with HRH Nwigwe Nwaneku, who served previously as a part of the Nze na Ozo council before being crowned King. Currently, members of the royal family opt to stylize their names with Ikejiofor, as their surname as opposed to their full lineage names with the convent of colonial naming systems. Ikejiofor was a king who ruled the community during the late 19th century through the 20th century, who oversaw the development of many changes to the area, including reorganizing land boundaries, and sponsoring schools and churches during the Biafran war, even opting to allow for the drilling of petroleum and administration to take place in Amandugba (then including Umundugba) in the late stages of the war. The traditional governance system includes councils of titled elders such as the Nze na Ozo, chiefs, and village heads, who oversee cultural and judicial matters.

=== Geography ===
Amandugba consists of several kindreds and villages, including:

- Umunumo
- Umunama
- Umuduru
- Umuezeala
- Umdurueze
- Umueye
- Umuelem
- Umuezealachukwu
- Umuoma
- Umudishi
- Umuokirika
- Umueze
- Umuama
- Umuokohia
- Umuokpara

Each village contributes to the town's cultural and social identity. These communities engage in collective festivals, local farming, and intermarriage, reinforcing intra-town solidarity.

=== Social institutions ===
The community celebrates several cultural festivals, including:

- Igu-Afor Festival: An annual thanksgiving ceremony held on December 29.
- Amandugba Day: Celebrated every January 1st, Amandugba Day serves as a reunion for the sons and daughters of the community. The event showcases cultural dances, social entertainment, and various competitions. It emphasizes community bonding, solidarity, and the importance of heritage.
- Oghoh Festival: A masquerade dance event originating from pre-colonial traditions. The Oghoh Festival is an exciting cultural dance event that encapsulates the spirit of Amandugba. It brings together community members in celebration and reinforces traditional values and cultural identity.
- New Yam Festival: The New Yam Festival is celebrated in honor of the harvest and the blessings of the yam, a staple crop in Igbo culture. This festival highlights gratitude for bountiful harvests and enhances community engagement through shared meals and traditional practices.

== Education and infrastructure ==
The economy of Amandugba is largely agrarian, with farming and trade being predominant activities. The community benefits from fertile land and a commitment to sustainable agricultural practices. Efforts are made to promote cooperative societies and market structures that bolster economic empowerment among residents. Efforts to improve infrastructure include a borehole project by Africa We Care, addressing water scarcity and reducing waterborne diseases.
