= Odiabidi =

- Town
- Interactive map of Odiabidi
- Coordinates: 4°57′N 6°38′E
- Country: Nigeria
- State: Rivers State
- LGA: Ahoada East
- City: Ahoada
- Time zone: UTC+1 (WAT)
- ZIP code: 510101

Odiabidi is a town located in Ahoada East Local Government Area of Rivers State, Nigeria. The postal code of Odiabidi is 510101.

== Notable events ==
- 2011: Singer and actress Muma Gee married her actor husband Prince Eke in a traditional wedding held in Odiabidi.
