= Boma Goodhead =

Nigerian politician

- In office 2019–2023
- Constituency: Asari-Toru Federal Constituency

Personal details
- Born: November 24, 1970 (age 55)
- Party: Peoples Democratic Party
- Relations: Asari Dokubo (sibling)
- Education: University of Port Harcourt
- Occupation: Politician

Boma Goodhead (born 24 November 1970) is a Nigerian politician and federal lawmaker representing Asari-Toru Federal Constituency in Rivers State. She is a member of the Peoples Democratic Party.

== Early life and education ==
Boma was born on 24 November 1970 to Melford Dokubo, a former high court judge in Nigeria. She is from Buguma in Asari-Toru local government area of Rivers State. She is the younger sister to Asari Dokubo.

== Political career ==
Boma started her political career as an assistant to former Delta State Governor James Ibori. In 2007, she contested for the chairmanship position of the Abuja Municipal Area Council (AMAC) under the All Nigeria Peoples Party (ANPP). She later joined the Action Congress of Nigeria (ACN) and contested for the party's nomination to represent the AMAC/Bwari Federal Constituency in the House of Representatives in 2011. In 2015, she was elected to represent the Asari-Toru/Akuku-Toru Federal Constituency of Rivers State in the House of Representatives under the Peoples Democratic Party (PDP). She was re-elected in 2019.

== Controversy ==
During a committee meeting in 2017, she allegedly threatened to “break the head” of a fellow lawmaker, Razak Atunwa who had written a letter to then President Goodluck Jonathan, asking him to appear before an ad hoc panel for a bribery scandal.
