= Umuakuru-Igbo =

Community in Rivers State, Nigeria

Umuakuru-Igbo is a community located in the north eastern area of Rivers State, Nigeria. The community's local government areas are Etche and Omuma. According to community sources, the area had an estimated population of about 5,700 out of which 2,565 were males and 3,135 were females. Livelihoods activities there include farming, trading and agro processing, although, collection and production of honey and other bee products have been the primary occupation of its inhabitants.
