= Ekpeye people =

Igbo ethnic group in Nigeria

Emene Ekpeye
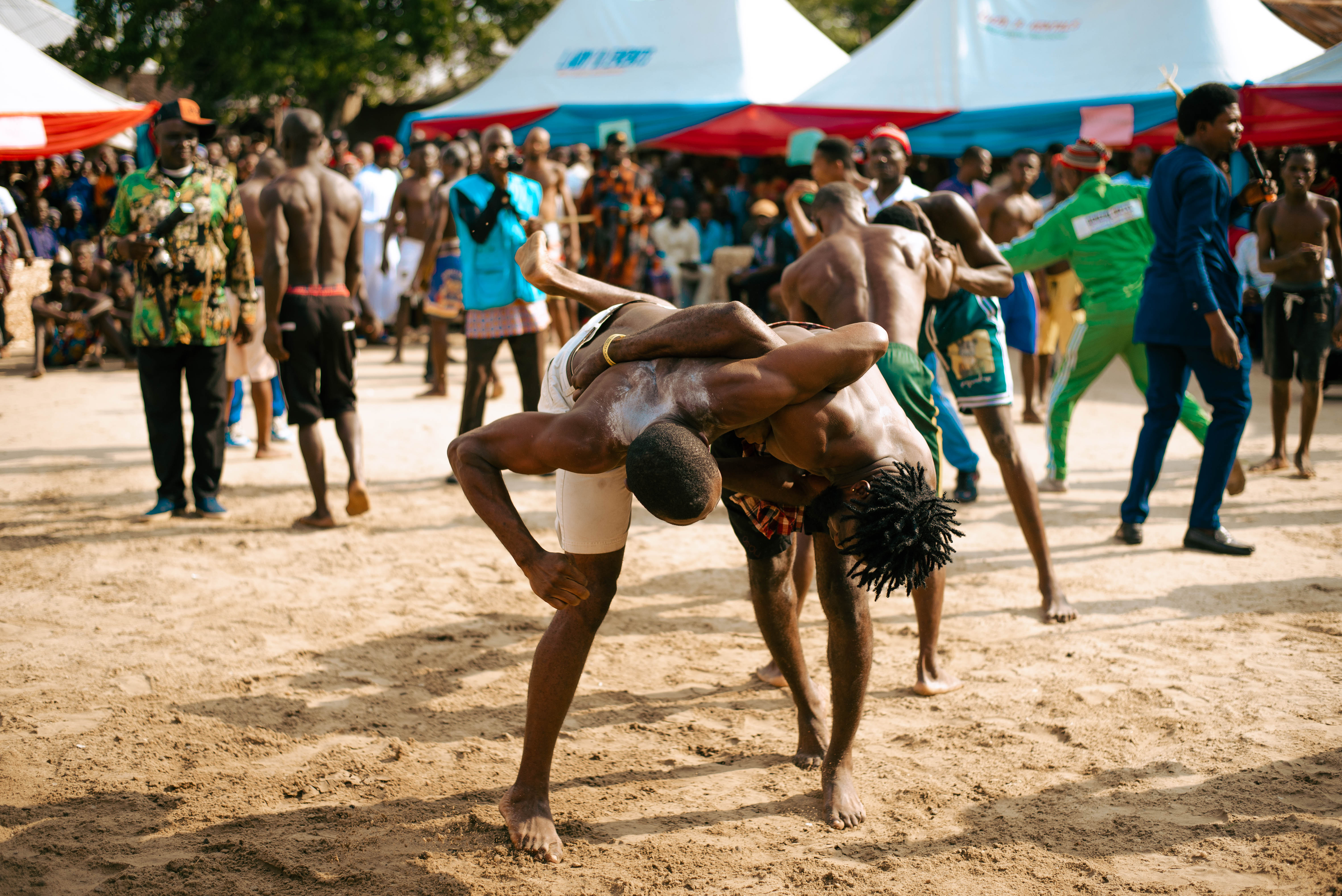
- Ekpeye Eta (Wrestling) Festival

Total population
- approx. 226,000

Regions with significant populations
- Rivers State, Nigeria

Languages
- Igbo

Religion
- Christianity . African Traditional Religion Omenela

Related ethnic groups
- Ikwerre, Ika people, Ogba

The Ekpeye is an ethnic group in Ahoada East and parts of Ahoada West Local Government Areas of Rivers State, in the Niger Delta region of Nigeria. The Ahoada metropolis serves as the administrative headquarters of the Ekpeye ethnic nation. The Ekpeye language is a distinct language. The Ekpeye people share close affinity and ancestral root with the Ikwerre and Ogba people of Rivers state.

The Ekpeye population is over 232,000.

== Politics ==
=== Traditional leadership ===
The Ekpeye ethnic nation is ruled by a king called the Eze Ekpeye Logbo also known as Ny'udu Ekpeye Logbo. The traditional stool that would unite the whole of Ekpeye people was created in 1977, with Eze Edmund Unoshi Ashirim of Ihuaba in Upata kingdom serving as the Eze Ekpeye Logbo I. After his demise, Eze Robinson O. Robinson of the Ubie kingdom ascended the throne in 1979 as Eze Ekpeye Logbo II. As of November 2024, the serving Eze Ekpeye Logbo is Eze Kelvin Ngozi Anugwo, who got enthroned on May 4, 2022.

The ethnic nation is divided into clans known as Igbu. As of 2024, there are seven major Igbus including:

1. Igbu Ehuda
2. Igbu Upata
3. Igbu Ubie
4. Igbu Akoh
5. Igbu Igbuduya
6. Igbu orlukwo
7. Igbu Ugbobi

== Language ==
The Ekpeye people speak Ekpeye, a language of the Volta-Niger branch of the Niger-Congo family.

== Festivals ==
Ogbumadube (Ekpeye Masquerade)

Owu Anakáni (Ekpeye masquerade)

The Ekpeye people celebrate several festivals such as the Eta, Ogwu Ekpeye, Owu, and Ugbokolo.
