= Owu-Aru-Sun Festival =

Festival celebrated by the kalabari people

Owu-Aru-Sun Festival is a two-day masquerade festival celebrated by the Kalabari people of Nigeria. The festival was first celebrated by Ekine Sekiapu under the leadership of the Opu Edi in Buguma City in 1908, 1927, 1973 and 1991.

On the first day of the Owu-Aru-Sun Festival, the heads of chief meet, perform sacrifices for protection, and opportunities are given for the asking of favours and protection. This day is referred to as the festival eve.

On the second day, masquerades are showcased by different groups. Later in the day, the masquerades proceed to the town hall where they are greeted by the chief drummer (Akwa Alabo). Each masquerade is then displayed. Once this is completed, a libation to mark the end of the masquerades is performed by the patron goddess of the masquerades (Ekine Alabo) with a bottle of gin and a glass. The Ekine Alabo asks for journey mercies back to the spirit world and assurance of their return at the next festival.
