= Eze Ekpeye Logbo =

List of Kings, who ruled Ekpeye Ethnic Nationality

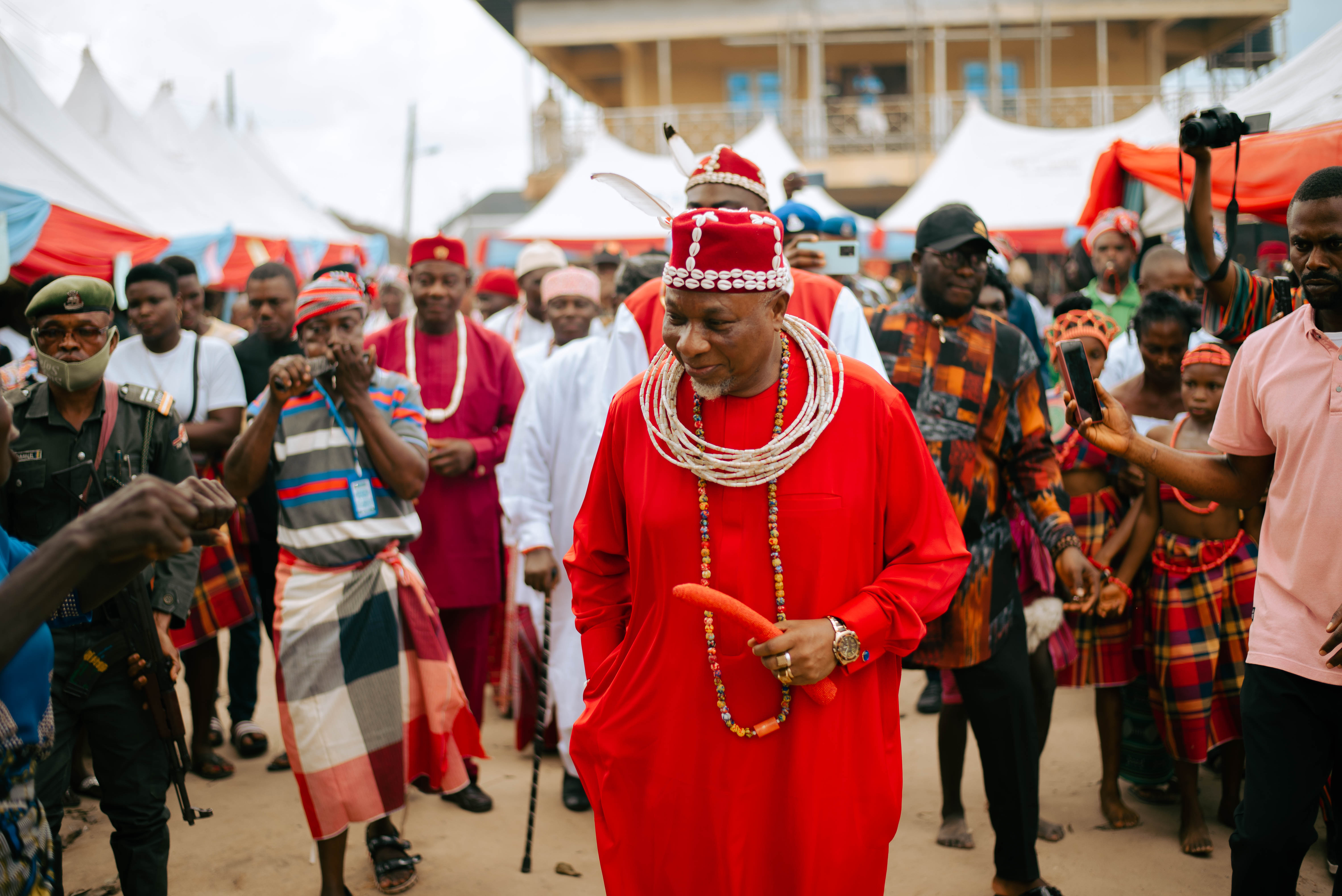
Eze Ekpeye Logbo III at the Eta Ekpeye 2024 festival

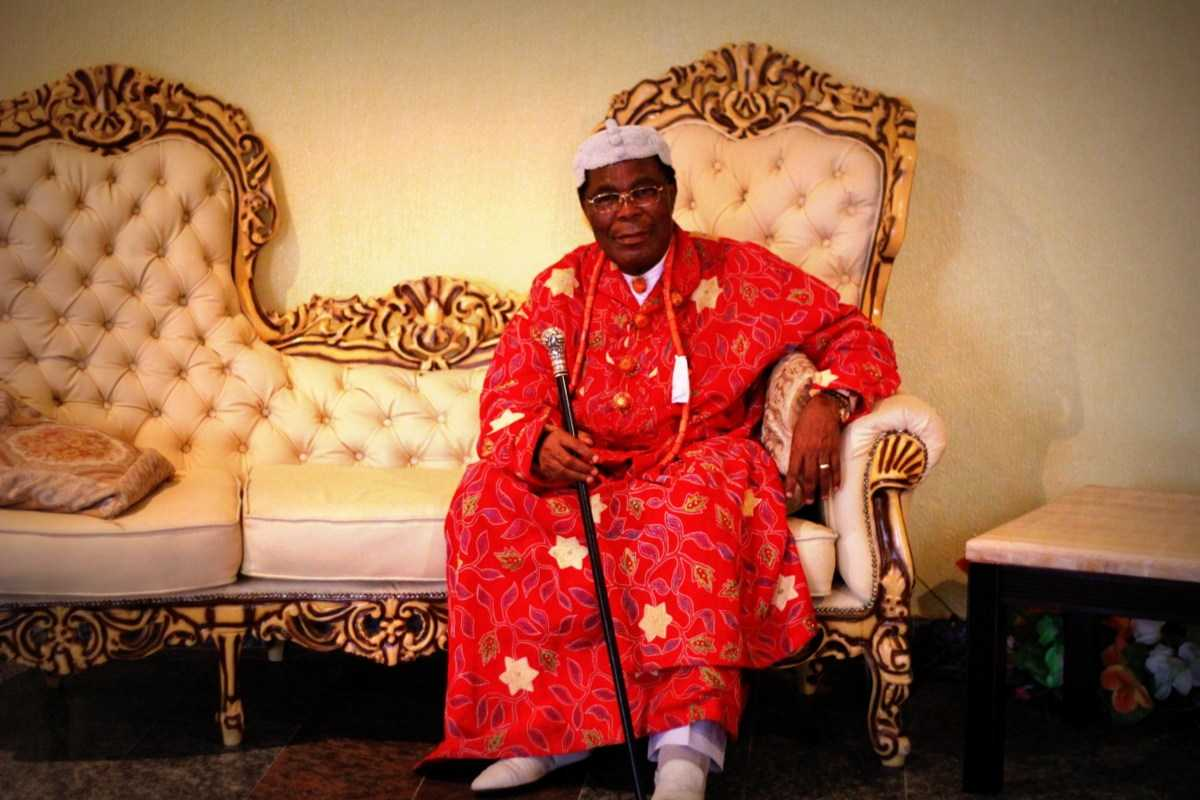
A photo of His Royal Majesty, Robinson O. Robinson, Eze Ekpeye Logbo II of Ekpeye Ethnic Nationality

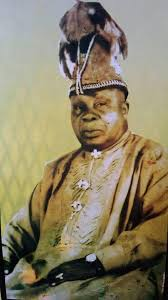
A photo of Eze Edmund Unoshi Ashirim, Eze Ekpeye Logbo I of the Ekpeye Ethnic Nationality

The Eze Ekpeye Logbo is the traditional ruler and the custodian of the culture of the Ekpeye people.

== List of Eze's of the Ekpeye Ethnic Nationality ==
- HRM, Eze Edmund Ashirim Unoshi, Eze Ekpeye Logbo I of Ekpeye Ethnic Nation. (1961–1976)
- His Imperial Majesty, Eze (Flt. Lt. Rtd.) Robinson Okpolunwo Robinson, CON, JP, Eze Ekpeye Logbo II of Ekpeye Ethnic Nation. (1976 - 2018)
- His Imperial Majesty Eze Sir (Amb) Kelvin Ngozi Anugwo, PhD, FNIM, MNIMN, JP, AP, Eze Ekpeye Logbo III of Ekpeye Ethnic Nation. (2022 - date)
