= Ogwu Ekpeye =

New yam festival of Ekpeye people

Ogwu Ekpeye festival
- Language: Igbo

Origin
- Meaning: Local Wrestling
- Region of origin: Igno Region, Nigeria

Ogwu Ekpeye is a festival traditionally celebrated by Ekpeye tribe in Rivers State. It is celebrated yearly and in the honour of the first daughters.

Before the commencement of this festival, the monarch, called Eze Igbu Ubie of Ubie kingdom in Ahoada West Local Government Area, Eze Maxwell A. Okpokiri, declares it open, after which there are traditional activities such as visitations, folklores, festival rites, masquerade display and others.
