= Tam David-West =

Nigerian politician

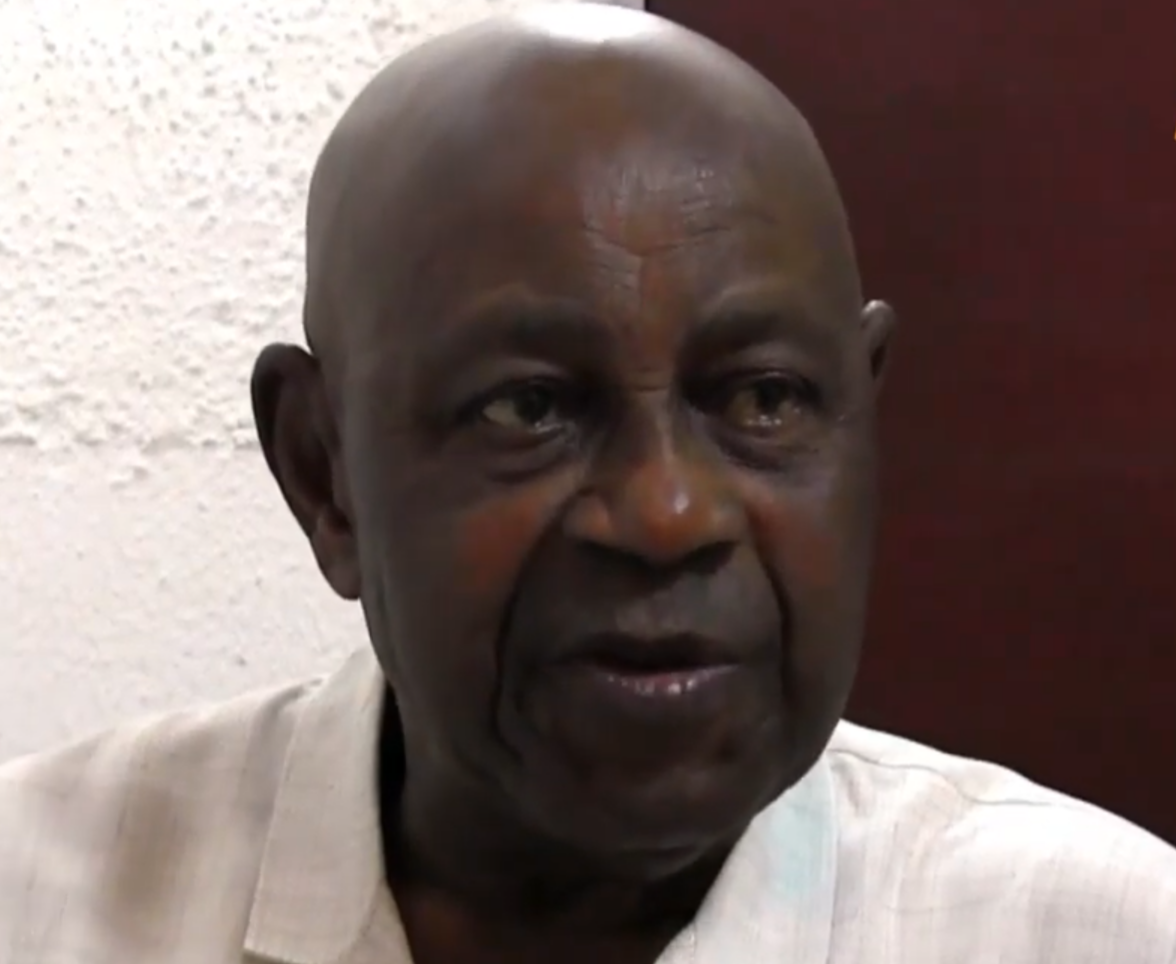
- Born: August 26, 1936; Buguma, Kalabari Kingdom
- Died: November 11, 2019 (aged 83)
- Occupations: academic, social critic, federal minister

Tamunoemi Sokari David-West (August 26, 1936 – November 11, 2019) was a Nigerian academic, social critic, and federal minister.

== Academia ==
David-West was born in Buguma, Kalabari, in what is now Rivers State. He received his higher education at the University of Ibadan (1956–1958) and earned a BSc degree at Michigan State University (1958–1960), an MSc degree at Yale University (1960–1962), and a PhD degree at McGill University (1964–1966). David-West was consultant virologist and senior lecturer at the University of Ibadan in 1969 and was subsequently promoted to professor of virology in 1975.

== Government ==
David-West served in Nigerian government as commissioner of education and a member of the Executive Council of Rivers State (1975–1979), as a member of the fifty-person Constitution Drafting Committee for the Federal Military Government of General Murtala Muhammed (1979), as federal minister of petroleum and energy under General Muhammadu Buhari (1984–1985), and as minister of mines, power, and steel under General Ibrahim Babangida (1986). He was eventually removed as minister and arrested by the Babangida regime for allegedly contributing to the economic adversity of the country; He was discharged and acquitted of these charges by Nigeria's Special Appeal Court on 8 August 1991.

== Politics ==
David-West was an outspoken and controversial critic of Nigerian government policy since his purge and arrest under the military regime of General Babangida. David-West criticized the unconstitutionality of the advisory council established by President Goodluck Jonathan in 2010, and he voiced caution against government unreservedly opening its doors to United States intelligence. Although he was not affiliated with any political party, David-West supported Chibuike Amaechi of the right-wing-leaning People's Democratic Party for reelection as governor of Rivers State.

== Personal life ==
David-West died on 11 November 2019. His death was mourned by President Muhammadu Buhari.

== Publications ==
David-West is the author of academic papers in virology that have appeared in scholarly journals such as Journal of Pathology and Bacteriology (1966), Transactions of the Royal Society of Tropical Medicine and Hygiene (1973), Intervirology (1974), and Journal of Hygiene (1974). He also wrote the book Philosophical Essays: Reflections on the Good Life (1980), in which he describes himself as a follower of British analytic philosopher and social critic Bertrand Russell. David-West's lecture in philosophy “God, Nature and the Universe” (1981) was delivered at the University of Ibadan.
