= Umundugba =

- Location of Umundugba in Nigeria
- Coordinates: 5°41′2″N 7°4′8″E
- Country: Nigeria
- State: Imo
- LGA: Isu
- ISO 3166 code: NG.IM.OE.OM
- National language: Igbo

Umundugba is a town in Isu Local Government Area of Imo State, Nigeria, and is the headquarters of Isu LGA.

== Location ==
Umundugba has been in existence since the 16th century. It is made up of nine autonomous communities. Most of the inhabitants are Christians. The town shares boundaries with the Isu Njaba, Ekwe, Amaigbo, Amandugba, and Ezuisu autonomous communities.

== Tradition ==
Umundugba is ruled by Umuezeala. Eze Isaiah Ugochukwu Anusionwu, Ezeahurukwe I of Amandugba was the father of Eze Onyegbuleonweya Christopher Ugochukwu, Ezeahurukwe II of Umundugba. The current traditional ruler is Eze Chukwuemeka Stephen Ugochukwu, Ezeahurukwe III of Umundugba. It is made up of two sub communities (Orori and Okwara). In Orori, are villages like Umuezeala, Okporo - Duru-aror, Okporo - Duru-njaba, and Umudike. While Okwara is made up of Umuokwara, Umuokebele, Umunwodor, Umuemeziem, and Umuokwara-oma. That's a total of nine villages. In Umezela, there are chiefs and Nze. Chief Akaraugo of Umundugba and Nze chiamaka who but hail from Umezela. In Umuokwara, also there're Chiefs and Ndi-Nze, like Chief Nwoke-iheoma-n'adi-mma, Nze-ako-n'obi, etc

The town has maintained its traditions and customs passed down from generation to generation. Among them being the "Oghu" festival celebrated around June to August, and shared with neighboring towns, like Amandugba, Ekwe, Amurie and Umuaka. Following the Oghu festival is the "Emume" which is also called "Iri-Ji" (New Yam Festival) which is celebrated second week(Saturday) of September at the Eze's palace. The Eze (ruler) of Umundugba is the custodian of this ceremony, and worthy sons and daughters of Umundugba, and deserving friends and in-laws of Umundugba are conferred chieftaincy titles during the ceremony. Is also blessed with strong and amiable political stalwart Chief Odogwu Chukwuma, Having hosted major football tournament in Umundugba,

== Recent times ==
One of the defunct Biafran refineries was located at the present day Umundugba during the Nigerian–Biafran civil war. The other refinery was located in Uzoakoli in present-day Abia State, Nigeria. Umundugba was among the first autonomous communities created during the time of Governor Samuel Onunaka Mbakwe, carved out from Amandugba town.

Both Umundugba and Amandugba have suffered from an unreliable water supply from streams and brooks that often dry up, and that are breeding grounds for malaria-carrying mosquitoes and sources of diseases such as cholera, diarrhea, dysentery, guinea worm, tape worm, and night blindness. A recent project by Africa We Care, a charity, has started to develop a supply based on a bore-hole.
