= Abalama =

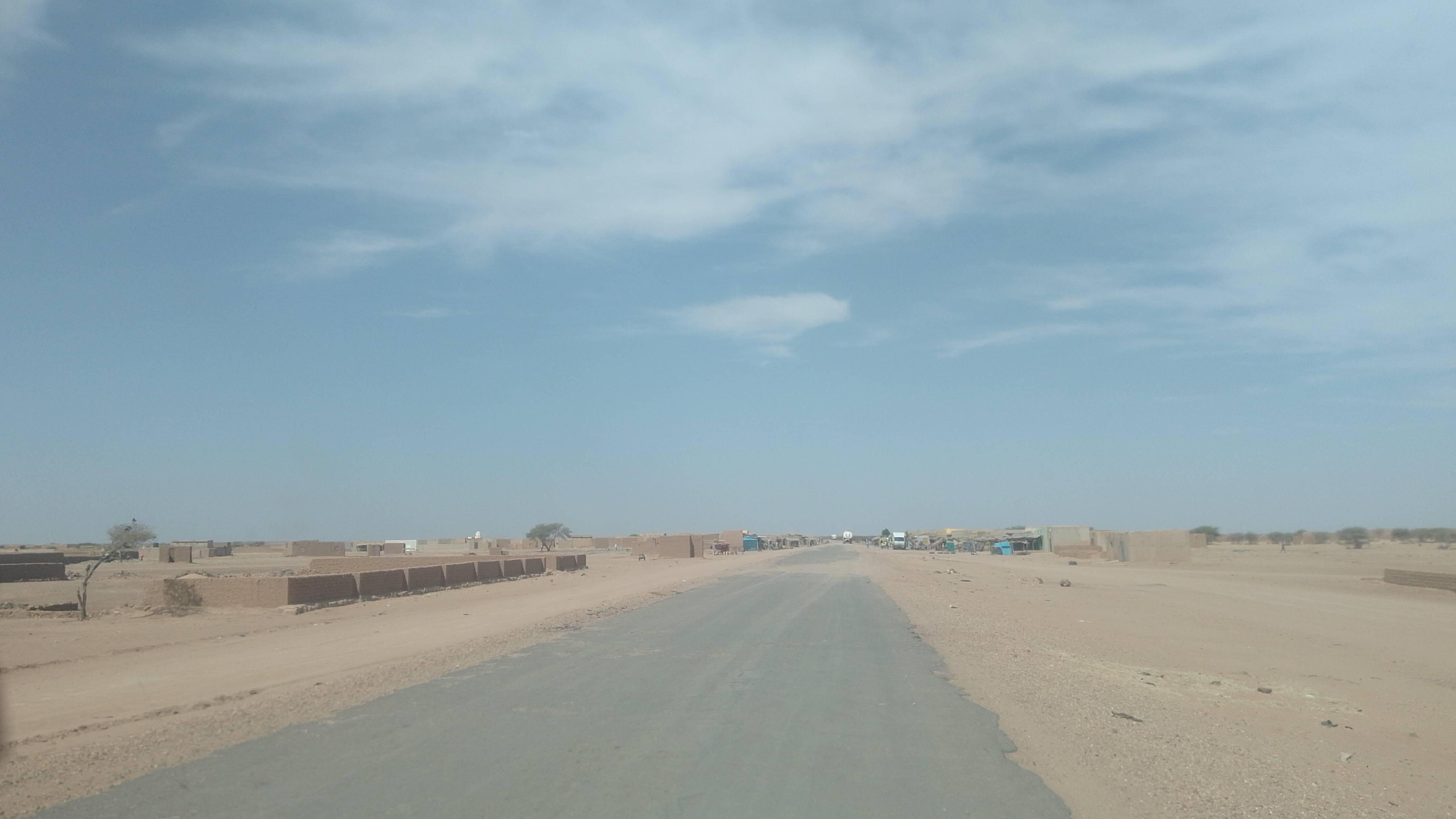

- Location within Nigeria
- Coordinates: 4°45′47″N 6°50′25″E
- Country: Nigeria
- State: Rivers State
- Local Government Area: Asari-Toru
- Established: 1880

Abalama is a Nigerian settlement 15 km southwest of Port Harcourt.

== Geography ==
Abalama is an island along Abalama Creek in the Asari-Toru Local Government Area in Rivers State, Nigeria. Like many areas in the Delta, water pollution is a problem.
