= 2019 Nigerian House of Representatives elections in Rivers State =

The 2019 Nigerian House of Representatives elections in Rivers State was held on February 23, 2019, to elect members of the House of Representatives to represent Rivers State, Nigeria.

== Overview ==
Affiliation	Party		Total
Affiliation	PDP	APC	Total
Before Election	10	3	13
After Election	13		13

== Summary ==
District	Incumbent	Party	Elected Reps Member	Party
Abua/Odua/Ahoada East	Apiafi Betty Okagua Jocelyn	PDP	Solomon Bob	PDP
Ahoada West/Ogba/Egbema/Ndoni	Nnam Obi Prince Uchechuku	PDP	Nnam Obi Prince Uchechuku	PDP
Akuku Toru/Asari Toru	Boma Goodhead	PDP	Boma Goodhead	PDP
Andoni Opobo/Nkoro	Awaji Inomeek Abiante	PDP	Awaji Inomeek Abiante	PDP
Degema/Bonny	Randolph Iwo Oraene Brown	PDP	Dagogo Doctor Festus	PDP
Eleme/Oyigbo/Tai	Mpigi Barinada	APC	Chisom Promise Dike	PDP
Etche/Omuma	Eke Jerome Amadi	PDP	Ephraim Nwuzu	PDP
Ikwerre/Emoha	Wihioka Chidi Frank	APC	Emerengwa Boniface Sunday	PDP
Khana/Gokana	Maurice Propnen	APC	Dumnmene Robison Dekor	PDP
Obio/Akpor	Chinda Kingsley	PDP	Chinda Kingsley	PDP
Okrika/Ogu/Bolo	Gogo Bright Tamuno	PDP	Gogo Bright Tamuno	PDP
Port Harcourt 1	Chikere Kenneth Anayo	PDP	Kenneth Anayo Chikere	PDP
Port Harcourt 2	Nsiegbe Blessing Ibibia	PDP	Igwe Chinyere Emmanuel	PDP

== Results ==
=== Abua/Odua/Ahoada East ===
A total of 8 candidates registered with the Independent National Electoral Commission to contest in the election. PDP candidate Solomon Bob won the election, defeating Omar Alfred Innocent of SDP and other party candidates.

=== Ahoada West/Ogba/Egbema/Ndoni ===
A total of 10 candidates registered with the Independent National Electoral Commission to contest in the election. PDP candidate Nnam Obi Prince Uchechuku won the election, defeating Godstime Ogbom Akaraka of Accord and other party candidates.

=== Akuku Toru/Asari Toru ===
A total of 15 candidates registered with the Independent National Electoral Commission to contest in the election. PDP candidate Boma Goodhead won the election, defeating Amachere Ibinabo Sonny of APGA and other party candidates.

=== Andoni Opobo/Nkoro ===
A total of candidates registered with the Independent National Electoral Commission to contest in the election. PDP candidate Awaji Inomeek Abiante won the election, defeating Dandison Jude of SDC and other party candidates.

=== Degema/Bonny ===
A total of 11 candidates registered with the Independent National Electoral Commission to contest in the election. PDP candidate Dagogo Doctor Festus won the election, defeating Inye Harry Marshal of Accord and other party candidates.

=== Eleme/Oyigbo/Tai ===
A total of 12 candidates registered with the Independent National Electoral Commission to contest in the election. PDP candidate Chisom Promise Dike won the election, defeating Nnamdi Ihute David of Accord and other party candidates.

=== Etche/Omuma ===
A total of 12 candidates registered with the Independent National Electoral Commission to contest in the election. PDP candidate Ephraim Nwuzu won the election.

=== Ikwerre/Emoha ===
A total of 16 candidates registered with the Independent National Electoral Commission to contest in the election. PDP candidate Emerengwa Boniface Sunday won the election, defeating Amadi Chidi Eleonu of APGA and other party candidates.

=== Khana/Gokana ===
A total of 23 candidates registered with the Independent National Electoral Commission to contest in the election. PDP candidate Dumnmene Robison Dekor won the election, defeating Anyie Innocent of ZLP and other party candidates.

=== Obio/Akpor ===
A total of 9 candidates registered with the Independent National Electoral Commission to contest in the election. PDP candidate Chida Kingsley Ogundu won the election, defeating Gboms King Tony of Accord and other party candidates.

=== Okrika/Ogu/Bolo ===
A total of 11 candidates registered with the Independent National Electoral Commission to contest in the election. PDP candidate Gogo Bright Tamuno won the election, defeating Gracetiti Fredson of GPN and other party candidates.

=== Port Harcourt 1 ===
A total of 9 candidates registered with the Independent National Electoral Commission to contest in the election. PDP candidate Kenneth Anayo Chikere won the election, defeating Tonye Rex Idaminabo of ADC and other party candidates.

=== Port Harcourt 2 ===
A total of 7 candidates registered with the Independent National Electoral Commission to contest in the election. PDP candidate Igwe Chinyere Emmanuel won the election, defeating Emmanuel Amadichukwu of Accord and other party candidates.
