= Uburu Ekwe =

- Autonomous Community
- Location within Nigeria
- Coordinates: 5°41′2″N 7°4′8″E
- Country: Nigeria
- State: Imo State
- Headquarters: Eziekwe

Government
  - Eze: Nicholas Nnanna Ibekwe
- Time zone: UTC+1 (WAT)
- Postcode: 474121
- National language: Igbo

Uburu Ekwe// is an autonomous community in Ekwe Community in Isu Local Government Area of Imo State, Nigeria. It comprises four main villages and several kindreds and clans. The villages that make up Uburu Ekwe are Umuduruehie, Umuokwara, Eziekwe and Odicheku. The headquarters of Uburu Ekwe is located at Eziekwe. Uburu Ekwe has an Anglican church (St Andrews) which everyone was worshiping with until the early 80`s when other Pentecostal churches came in. They have rich tradition and culture

== Location and geography ==
Uburu Ekwe is located in the northern part of Ekwe in southern part of Isu Local Government Area of Imo State. Uburu Ekwe is bounded to the East by Isu Njaba, to the South by Ekwe Nwe Orie, to the West by Ebenator and to the North by Okwudor.

== Notable people ==
- Apollos Okwuchi Nwauwa - Director, Africana Studies Program, Bowling Green State University, Ohio, USA
