= Apollos Okwuchi Nwauwa =

Nigerian-born historian and professor of Africana Studies

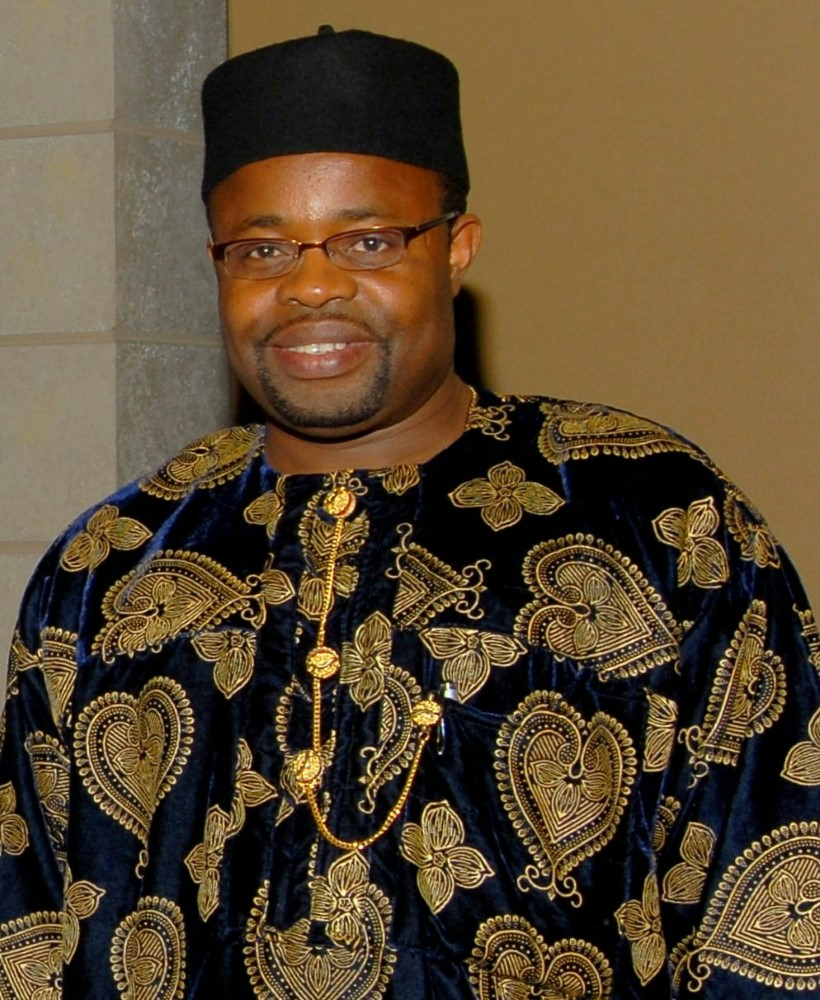
- Born: Ekwe-Orlu, Imo State, Nigeria
- Education: Dalhousie University, Halifax, Nova Scotia, Canada; Bendel State University, Ekpoma, Nigeria
- Writing career
- Subjects: Colonial history, history of education, intellectual history, historiography

Apollos Okwuchi Nwauwa is a Nigerian-born historian and professor of Africana Studies. He is currently the director of Africana studies, College of Arts and Sciences, Bowling Green State University, Bowling Green, Ohio. Nwauwa earned his Bachelor of Arts (B.A.) degree from the then Bendel State University (later renamed Ambrose Alli University) Ekpoma, Edo State, Nigeria. He received his M.A. and Ph.D. in History at Dalhousie University, Halifax, Nova Scotia Canada, in 1989 and 1993 respectively. Nwauwa is a member of many learned societies and served as President of the Igbo Studies Association from 2010-2014. He is the current editor of OFO: Journal of Transatlantic Studies. Nwauwa is author and editor of many book and scholarly journal articles.

== Academic training ==
Born to Nze David Nwauwa Irechukwu and Veronica Nwandawa Irechukwu (both late) of Uburuekwe in Isu Local Government Area of Imo State, Prof Nwauwa attended Community School, Ekwe and Umuaka High School. Thereafter, he proceeded to Federal School of Arts and Sciences, Aba where he spent less than two month before gaining admission into the new Bendel State University, Ekpoma in 1982. Nwauwa proceeded to Dalhousie University in Halifax, Nova Scotia, Canada where he earned his M.A. and PhD. degrees in 1989 and 1993 respectively. His doctoral dissertation was entitled "Britain and the Politics of University Education for Africans, 1860-1960".

== Professional career ==
Nwauwa taught at Bendel State University for a year before proceeding to Canada for graduate studies. After earning his doctorate, he accepted an offer at assistant professor of history at Rhode Island College from 1993–2000, and was also a visiting professor at Brown University. In 2000, Nwauwa left Rhode Island College to join the faculty of History at Bowling Green State University, Bowling Green, Ohio.

== Administrative service ==
Nwauwa is currently the director of Africana studies at Bowling Green State University, Bowling Green, Ohio.

== Community leadership ==
- From 2009 to 2011, Nwauwa served as the conference chair for the Igbo Studies Association (ISA), where he coordinated two consecutive annual conferences that attracted from all over the world for a three-day conference in Washington, D.C., US.
- From 2009 to 2011, Nwauwa served as the president of the Nigerian Association of Greater Toledo after serving for four years as vice president.
- From 2010 to 2014, Nwauwa served as the president of the Igbo Studies Association (ISA)
- Since 2014, Nwauwa has been serving as the vice president of the Nigerian Diaspora Organization in the Americas, Northwest Ohio Chapter (NIDOA-NWO).
- From 2015-2017, Nwauwa served as the general secretary, Nigerians in Diaspora Organizations in the Americas (NIDOA-USA).
- Since 2016, Nwauwa was elected the chief executive officer of Uburuekwe Development Foundation (UDF)
- In January 2017, Nwauwa was elected chairman of the Nigerian Diaspora Movement (NDM)

== Publications ==
Books include:

- Nigerian Political Leaders: Vision, Actions and Legacies (with Julius Adekunle), New Jersey: Goldline and Jacobs Publishing, 2015.
- Between Tradition and Change: Sociopolitical and Economic Transformation Among the Igbo of Nigeria (with Ebere Onwudiwe), New Jersey: Goldline & Jacobs Pub., 2012
- Against All Odds: The Igbo Experience in Post-Colonial Nigeria (with Chima Korieh), New Jersey: Goldline & Jacobs Publishing, 2011.
- Imperialism, Academe, and Nationalism: Britain and University Education for Africans, 1860 - 1960, London: Frank Cass, 1997.

Refereed Journal Articles include:

- '"Hypotheses of State Formation and the Evolution of Kingship (Ezeship) Tradition in Igboland: A Socio-Political Anatomy of the Origin of the Aro Kingdom,” International Journal of African Studies, Vol. 6, No. 2, 2008.
- “Politics of Race, Power and Ideology: The Fluctuating Fortune of African Studies in the United States”, UFAHAMU: Journal of African Studies, Vol. 34, Issue 3, 2008, pp. 25–65.
- “The Policies and Challenges of the Universal Basic Education Scheme in Nigeria” (with Ogechi Anyanwu), International Journal of Social & Management Sciences, Volume 1, No. 2, 2006.
- “Empire, Race and Ideology: Edward Blyden’s Initiatives for an African University, Africa-Centered Knowledge, 1872-1890,” International Journal of African Studies, vol. II, no. 2, 2001, 1-18.
- “Far Ahead of His Time: James Africanus Horton’s Initiatives for a West African University and His Frustrations, 1862-1871”, Cahiers D’Études Africaines, vol. 153, no. XXXIXIX-1, 1999, pp. 107–121.
- "University Education for Africans, 1900-1935: An `Anathema’ to British Administrative Policy", Asian and African Studies, vol. 27, No. 3, 1995, pp. 263–292.
- "The Aro Secondary Source-Material: A Biblio-Historiographical Review", Ife Journal of History (University of Ife, Ile-Ife, Nigeria), Vol. 2, No. 1, 1994, pp. 106–117
- "The British Establishment of Universities in Tropical Africa, 1920-1948: A Reaction Against the Spread of American `Radical' Influence", Cahiers D'Études Africaines, Vol. 130, No. XXXIII-2, 1993, 247-274.
- "The British Abolition of the Slave Trade: A Re-Appraisal of the Humanitarian and Economic Controversy", Africa Quarterly, Vol. 31, Nos. 3-4, 1992, pp. 45–59.
- "On Aro Primary Source-Material: A Critique of the Historiography", History in Africa: A Journal of Method, Vol. 19, 1992, pp. 377–385.
- "Integrating Arochukwu into the Regional Chronological Structure", History in Africa: A Journal of Method, Vol. 18, 1991, pp. 297–310.
- "The Dating of the Aro Chiefdom: A Synthesis of Correlated Genealogies", History in Africa: A Journal of Method, Vol. 17, 1990, pp. 227–245.
- "State Formation in Africa: A Reconsideration of the Traditional Theories", Africa Quarterly, Vol. XXVII, Nos. 3-4, 1989, pp. 23–35.

Other Publications include:

- “Nnamdi Azikiwe: High Priest of National Unity” in Apollos Nwauwa and Julius Adekunle (eds), Nigerian Political Leaders: Vision, Actions and Legacies, New Jersey: Goldline and Jacobs Publishing, 2015.
- “The Impact of British Rule in Igboland: A Survey of Political Disorder in Ekwe Town, Orlu District, 1900-2000,” Adam Paddock & Toyin Falola (eds), Themes and Methods in African Studies: Essays in Honor of Adiele E. Afigbo, Trenton, NJ: Africa World Press/The Red Sea Press, 2009.
- “K.O. Dike and the New African Nationalist Historiography," in Adam Paddock and Toyin Falola (eds), Themes and Methods in African Studies: Essays in Honor of Adiele E. Afigbo, Trenton, NJ: Africa World Press/The Red Sea Press, 2009.
- “Don was “Donatus” and he was “Ohadike,” commentary in Don C. Ohadike, Sacred Drums of Liberation: Religions and Music of Resistance in Africa and the Diaspora, Trenton, NJ: Africa World Press, 2007, pp.xxxvi-xlv.
- “Concepts of Democracy and Democratization in Africa Revisited,” in Charles Nieman (ed.), Democracy and Globalization, Kent State University Press, 2005.
- “The Legacies of Colonialism and the Politics of the Cold War,” in Toyin Falola (ed.), Africa, Volume 5: Contemporary Africa, Durham: Carolina Academic Press, 2003.
- “Educational Policies and Reforms,” in Toyin Falola (ed.) Africa, Volume 4: The End of Colonial Rule, Durham: Carolina Academic Press, pp. 167–183, 2002.
- “Creech Jones and African Universities, 1943-1950,” in Chris Youé and Timothy Stapleton (eds), Agency and Action in Colonial Africa, London: Palgrave Publishers (formerly Macmillan), 2001, pp. 126–140.
- "The Europeans in Africa: Prelude to Colonialism", in Toyin Falola (ed.), African History and Cultures to 1885, Durham, Florida: Carolina Academic Press, 2000, pp. 303–317.
