= Ekpeye language =

Distinct Igboid language spoken in Rivers State and Bayelsa State, Nigeria

Ekpeye
- ẹkpeye
- Native to: Nigeria
- Region: Rivers State
- Ethnicity: Ekpeye people
- Native speakers: 226,000
- Language family: Niger–Congo?: Atlantic–Congo; Volta–Niger; yeai; Igboid; Ekpeye

Language codes
- ISO 639-3: ekp
- Glottolog: ekpe1253

Ekpeye language is one of the languages spoken in Rivers State, Nigeria. It is spoken predominantly by the Ekpeye people of the Ekpeye ethnic group in Nigeria. According to Roger Blench, Ekpeye is classified as an Igboid language.

== Writing system ==
Ekpeye alphabet
a	b	bh	ch	d	dh	e	ẹ	g	gb	gw	h	i	ị	j	k	kp	kw
l	m	n	nw	ny	o	ọ	p	s	sh	t	u	ụ	w	wh	y	z	zh

== Phonology ==
=== Vowels ===
Ekpeye has nine vowel phonemes:

Vowels of Ekpeye
	Front	Back
Close	i	u
Near-close	ɪ	ʊ
Close-mid	e	o
Open-mid	ɛ	ɔ
Open	a	

The language has no long nasal vowels, no contrast between oral and nasal vowels, and no allophonic variants. The vowels carry tones, as Ekpeye is a tonal language. Ekpeye exhibits active synchronic vowel harmony.

== Distribution ==
- Rivers State: Ahoada East, Ahoada West.
