= Akinima =

Town in Ahoada West, Nigeria

Coordinates: 5°05′17″N 6°28′10″E

Akinima is a town in the region of Ahoada West Local Government Area in Rivers State, Nigeria. Akinima is the headquarter of Ahoda West. Akinima is in the north western part of Rivers State, under Rivers West Senatorial district in Port Harcourt city. Akinima is one of the areas that is being affected by annual flooding in Rivers State.

== Climate ==
In Akinima, the dry season is hot and largely cloudy, and the climate is oppressive all year long. The wet season is warm and cloudy. The average annual temperature ranges from 21 to 31 degrees Celsius (69 to 88 degrees Fahrenheit), rarely falling below 20 °C (68 °F) or rising over 33 °C (91 °F).
