= Rivers State Independent Electoral Commission =

The Rivers State Independent Electoral Commission (RSIEC), is a statutory body constituted by the Government of Rivers State, Nigeria, under section 5(a) of the Independent Electoral Commission Law (2000) to oversee the implementation of election procedures. Headquartered in Port Harcourt, the Commission's primary function is "to organize, undertake and supervise all elections to local government councils within the state." It consists of 7 members who are appointed by the Governor of Rivers State with confirmation by the Rivers State House of Assembly.

== Departments ==
The RSIEC is divided into the following departments:

- Media and Public Affairs
- Finance, Accounts and Legal Services
- Ad-hoc Recruitment
- Training and Deployment
- Political Affairs and Monitoring
- Election Planning and Monitoring
- Works, Transport and Logistics

== RSIEC Chairmen ==
- Sam Jaja (2000 - 2004)
- Nimi Briggs (2007 - 2011)
- Augustine Ahiauzu (2012 – 2015)
- Chukwunenye Uriri (2015 - 2020)
- George O. Omereji (2020 - 2023)
- Adolphus Enebeli (2023 - till date)
