= Asari-Toru =

Asari-Toru Asalga
- LGA
- Nickname: Pacesetting LGA
- Motto: We set the pace for others to follow
- Interactive map of Asari-Toru
- Location within Nigeria Location within Africa
- Coordinates: 4°42′N 6°48′E
- Country: Nigeria
- State: Rivers State
- Date created: 29 May 1989
- Seat: Buguma City

Government
  - Local Government Chairman: Engr. Sule Amachree PhD (APP)
  - Deputy Local Government Chairman: Hon. (Mrs) Tekena Daphne Wokoma (APP)
  - Local Government Council: Ward 1: Telema P. George (APP); Ward 2: Diepriye Nifeipiri (APP); Ward 3: Tombo M Kingmate (LP); Ward 4: Barr Tams Georgedouglas (APP); Ward 5: Gofabia Johnbull (APP); Ward 6: Nyo West (APP); Ward 7: Omuboye Braide (APP); Ward 8: Value Ibima Harry (APP); Ward 9: Owanate Afoma West (APP); Ward 10: Deinpiribo Promise Igonikon(APP); Ward 11: Martins Kombo (APP); Ward 12:Opiribo Clinton (APP); Ward 13: Bobmanuel (APP); Pst Egba Godknows, Council Secretary (APP); Gabriel Princewill, Chief Press Secretary (APP); Hon. Samson Davidwest, Chief of Staff (APP)

Area
  - Land: 113 km^{2} (44 sq mi)

Population (2016)
  - Total: 308,800
  - Density: 2,733/km^{2} (7,080/sq mi)
- Projection
- Time zone: UTC+1 (WAT)
- Nigeria Postal Code: 504101

Asari-Toru is a Local Government Area in Rivers State, Nigeria.

== General information ==
Asari-Toru Local Government Area was created out of the old Degema Local Government Area on May 16, 1989. Sule Amachree was announced as the Local Government Chairman winning his seat under the Peoples Democratic Party (PDP) in the April 17, 2021 Rivers State Local Government Elections conducted by the Rivers State Independent Electoral Commission (RSIEC).

Asari-Toru is the “Seat” of the Ancestral Stool of the Kalabari Speaking Dynasty which cuts across Akuku-Toru and Degema Local Government Areas.

== Climate/Geography ==
There are two main seasons in Asari Toru LGA, which is 113 square kilometres or 44 square miles in size: the dry and the rainy. The average temperature and humidity of Asari Toru LGA are 25 degrees Celsius (77 degrees Fahrenheit) and 91 percent, respectively. Numerous rivers and tributaries flow into Asari Toru LGA.

The Local Government Area upon creation presently encompasses Seventeen (17) Communities namely:

- Buguma,
- Abalama,
- Abiama,
- Angulama,
- Atuka,
- Ido,
- Ifoko,
- Illelema,
- Krakrama,
- Minama,
- Okpo,
- Omekweama,
- Omekwetariama,
- Oporoama,
- Sama,
- Agama,
- Tema.

Buguma City is the Headquarters of the Local Government Area and Seat of the King of Kalabari Kingdom: His Royal Majesty, King (Prof.) T.J.T Princewill, Abbi the XI, Amayanabo of Kalabari Kingdom.

These communities have been grouped into thirteen (13) electoral wards, ten (10) of these wards are within the capital, Buguma City; while the remaining are grouped into Isia Group I, Isia Group II and West Central Group.

The local government area has an estimated area of 113 km^{2} and a population of 308,800 by projection of March 21, 2016.

The postal code of the area is 504101 .
