= Isu, Nigeria =

Local Government Area in Imo State, Nigeria

Isu
- LGA
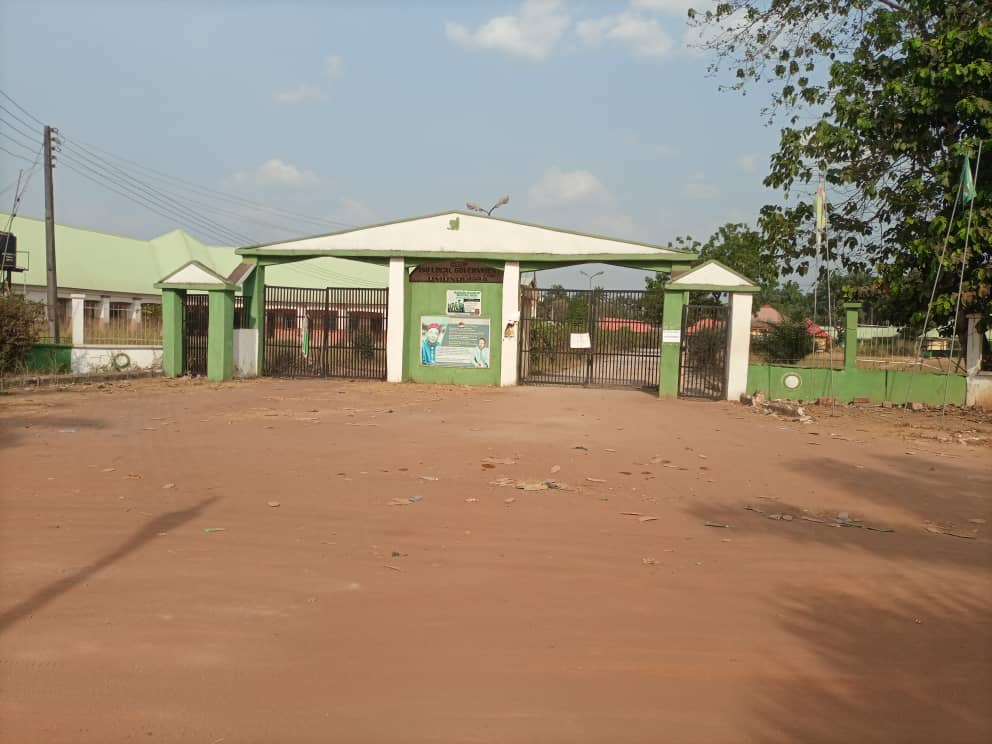
- Seal
- Nickname: Isu umu-oma
- Interactive map of Isu
- Location within Nigeria
- Coordinates: 5°41′2″N 7°4′8″E
- Country: Nigeria
- State: Imo State
- Headquarters: Umundugba

Government
  - Chairman: Kenneth Uka

Area
  - Land: 40 km^{2} (15 sq mi)

Population (2006)
  - Total: 164 428
  - Density: 4.1/km^{2} (11/sq mi)
- Time zone: UTC+1 (WAT)
- Website: http://www.isu.gov.ng/

Isu// is a local government area in Imo State of Nigeria. Its headquarters are in the town of Umundugba. Other communities are Amandugba, Ekwe, Uburu Ekwe, Isunjaba, Amurie Omanze, Ebenator Ekwe and Oboro Amurie. The name comes from the Isu people, a subgroup of the Igbo people.

Amandugba and neighboring Umundugba were originally one town. Both communities have suffered from a horrid water supply from streams and brooks that often evaporate at an alarming speed. The mentioned bodies of water also serve as breeding grounds for malaria-borne mosquitoes and are sources of diseases such as cholera, diarrhea, dysentery, and parasites such as the guinea worm and the tape worm. A recent project by Africa We Care, a charity, has started to develop a supply based on a bore-hole.

A local school in the area is known as the Missionary Institute of God's Image (MIGI) German Language School. This school is located in Amurie Omanze in Isu Local Government Area. The MIGI German Language School has the recognition of the Imo State Ministry of Tertiary Education. German language is being taught there for students who wish to study in Germany. Married couples that would like to join certain relatives also attend several lessons.

== Population ==
The estimated population of Isu LGA is 111,213, with the vast majority being members of the Igbo ethnic group. The Igbo language is extensively spoken in the LGA while Christianity is the widely practiced religion in the area. A number of colourful festivals are held in Isu LGA and these include the Igba nta festival.

== Geography ==
Isu LGA covers a total area of 40 km squared and has an average temperature of 26 °C. The LGA is forested with average wind speed in the area put at 11 km/h. The average humidity level of Isu LGA is 71 percent while the area has a number of rivers and streams flowing through its territory.

=== Climate ===
In Isu, the dry season is hot, muggy, and partly cloudy whereas the wet season is warm, oppressive, and overcast. The average annual temperature ranges from 18 °C (65 °F) to 31 °C (88 °F), with lows of 14 °C (58 °F) and highs of 33 °C (91 °F) being rare.

The best time of year to visit Isu for hot-weather activities, according to the beach/pool score, is from late November to early February.

== Economy ==
Farming is an important aspect of the economy of Isu LGA with the area known for the cultivation of a number of crops such as yam, cassava, and oil palm. Trade also flourishes in the LGA with a number of markets where a plethora of commodities are bought and sold found in the area. Other economic activities engaged in by the dwellers of Isu LGA include lumbering and blacksmithing.
