= Ogba people =

Ethnic group in Rivers State, Nigeria

Ogba
Ogba

Total population
- 531,000

Regions with significant populations
- Nigeria - 531,000

Languages
- Ogba

Religion
- Christianity 98%

Related ethnic groups
- Ikwerre, Ekpeye, Ndoki

Ogba is an ethnic group in Rivers State, Nigeria. The Ogba people speak the Ogba language . The Ogba reside in a local government called Ogba-Egbema-Ndoni in Rivers state Nigeria. The Ogba language is made up of two dialects, which are Egi and Igburu. The Ogba kingdom is made up of three clans: Egi, originally comprising 17 towns but 16 survived, Igburu, and Usomini. Its largest urban town is Omoku. Ogba people speak two dialects of the ogba language: the Egi and Igburu. Eligbo and Ukporomini are two Ogba communities in Ahoada East Local Government Area.

Ogba people share historical ties with the Ekpeyes and Ikwerre people.

== History ==
The Ogbas are in present-day Rivers State. They share historical ties with the Ekpeye people of Ahoada and Ikwerre. This history of the community, written by its current king, sets out to cover the entire sweep of its history, from 'the origin of the Ogbas' (attributed to the fourteenth century) to the colonial period (post-independence history being treated only cursorily). It is based mainly on local oral traditions, taken partly from colonial Intelligence Reports, but also including extensive new material collected by the author; some use is also made, for the colonial period, of contemporary documents from British and Nigerian archives, and for prehistory, of archaeological evidence.

== Politics ==
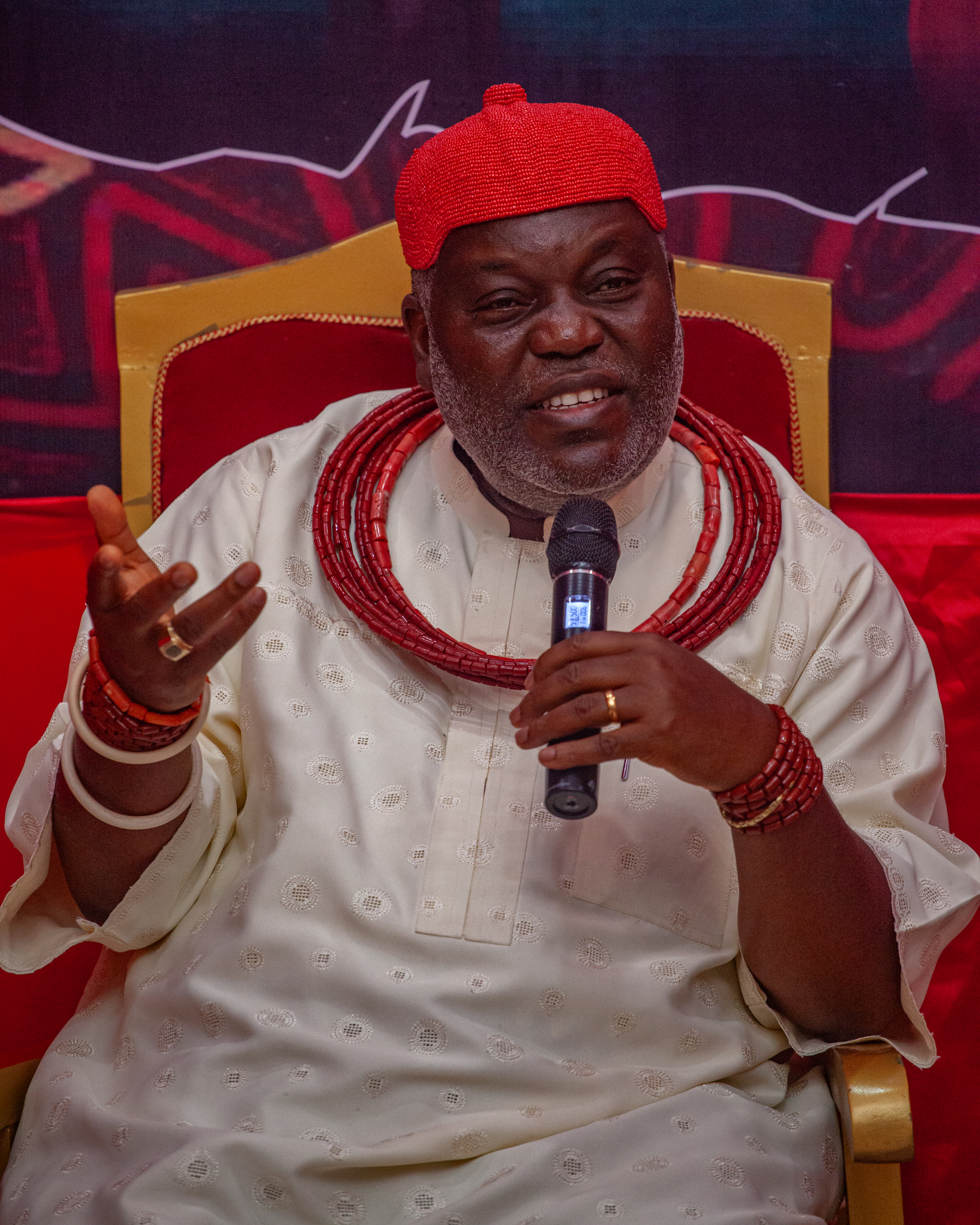
Oba of Ogba

The Ogba people are ruled by the Eze Ogba of Ogba land, Barr. Nwachukwu Nnam Obi III.

== Nchaka festival ==
NchakaEgwu Ogba is an annual cultural festival celebrated within November or December to mark harvest season to thank God (Chukwuabiama) and other divinities for giving them fertile soil and good harvest.

It is symbolized with Yam rituals. The festival begins with a royal proclamation made by the Eze (king) at the traditional market square known as Ahiankwo. The proclamation is marked with a royal feat when the Eze of Ogba Land entertains clan heads traditional title holders and other elites. The festival last for five days. Yam is the main food throughout the festival period. The festíval features sanitation and purification exercises involving painting and decoration of houses, clearing of shrines, bush paths, leading to farms, streams, sacred grounds, and market square. The festival features processions, courtesy visits and wrestling competitions. The climax of events is displayed by Nchaka dance and magical displays. There are two categories of Nchaka masquerade, namely Nchaka-ki Iyenwa (the female) and Nchaka ki-ikenwa (the male).

The festival offers an opportunity for all communities in the kingdom to come together also to interact with their neighbors. Ogbas particularly those in Diaspora seize the opportunity to return home, some with their foreign friend.

On the occasion of 2010 Nchaka festival, the reigning Monarch, The King. Chukwumela Nnam Obi II (0ON,JP) observed that:

"The objectives of any cultural policy for the country (Nigeria) should aim at ensuring the continuity of traditional skills. Sports, and cultural festivals and their progressive adaption to serve modern needs and establish a disciplined, moral and enterprising society".
