= Ito Ogbo Festival =

Igbo tribe festival

- Dates: holds every three years
- Years active: 1450
- Organiser: Obosi People

Ito Ogbo Festival is a festival predominantly common amongst the Obosi people at the Idemili North Local Government area at Anambra State. The festival aims at celebrating elders who are between 80 – 82 years old while they are alive. The festival holds every three years in the community, and it has been celebrating elderly who were born at the time that the community was established.

== History ==
The Ito-Ogbo Obosi festival is an agelong festival that dates back to over five hundred years. It is particularly aimed at celebrating and thanking God for the octogenarians (members of age group eighty years and above) in the kingdom. The festival is marked by various activities such as prayers, songs, dances, speeches, gifts, and feasts.

During the ceremony which holds every three years, both male and female octogenarians are honored with special titles and inducted into the octogenarian age grade. The festival has helped to harness and develop the tourism potentials of the Obosi Kingdom as it has attracted people from all walks of life.

== Festivity ==
The festival is usually celebrated with pomp and grand style as people from all walks of life come together to celebrate the elderly. The 2021 Ito Ogbo Obosi festival saw 131 octogenarians celebrated and honored specially. It was attended by citizens of the community, tourists and delegates from important offices including from the Federal Ministry of Information and also from the Ministry of Culture and Tourism.

The 2021 festival also featured the Minister of Information, Culture and Tourism, Lai Mohammed who was well represented the Permanent Secretary of the Ministry of Information, Dr. Mrs. Ifeoma Anyanwutaku said that the ministry will upgrade the longevity celebration to a national level and would also initiate the process of getting the festival recognized by UNESCO.

The program has been upheld and sustained by the custodians of the Obosi Culture who are well versed with the kingdom's agelong tradition.
