= George Basden =

Archdeacon of the Niger (1873–1944)

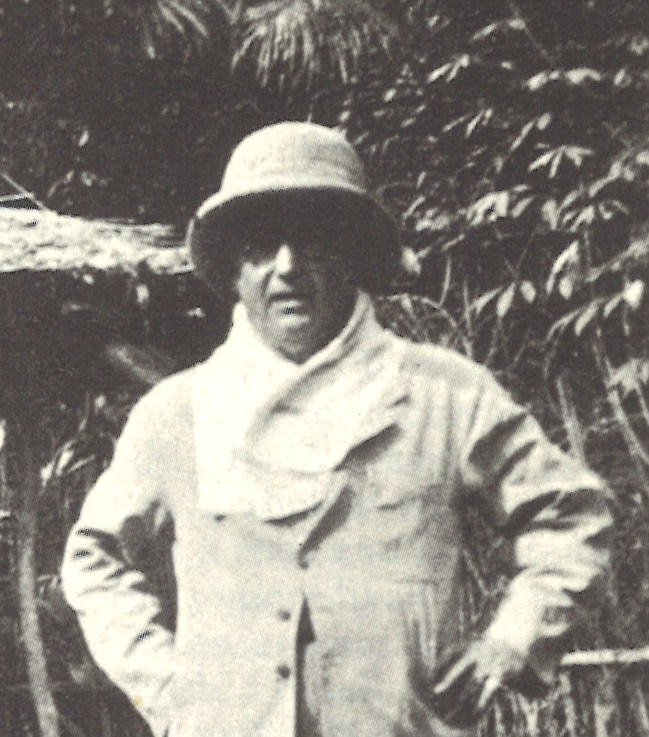
George Basden (1935)

George Thomas Basden OBE FRGS (31 October 1873 – 30 December 1944) was Archdeacon of the Niger from 1926 until 1936.

He was educated at the CMS College, Islington and Durham University. He was ordained in 1901 and was at Onitsha from 1902 until 1908. He was the Principal at Awka from 1908 until 1926 before his appointment as Archdeacon; and Rector of Jevington afterwards.

== Photographs by G.T. Basden ==
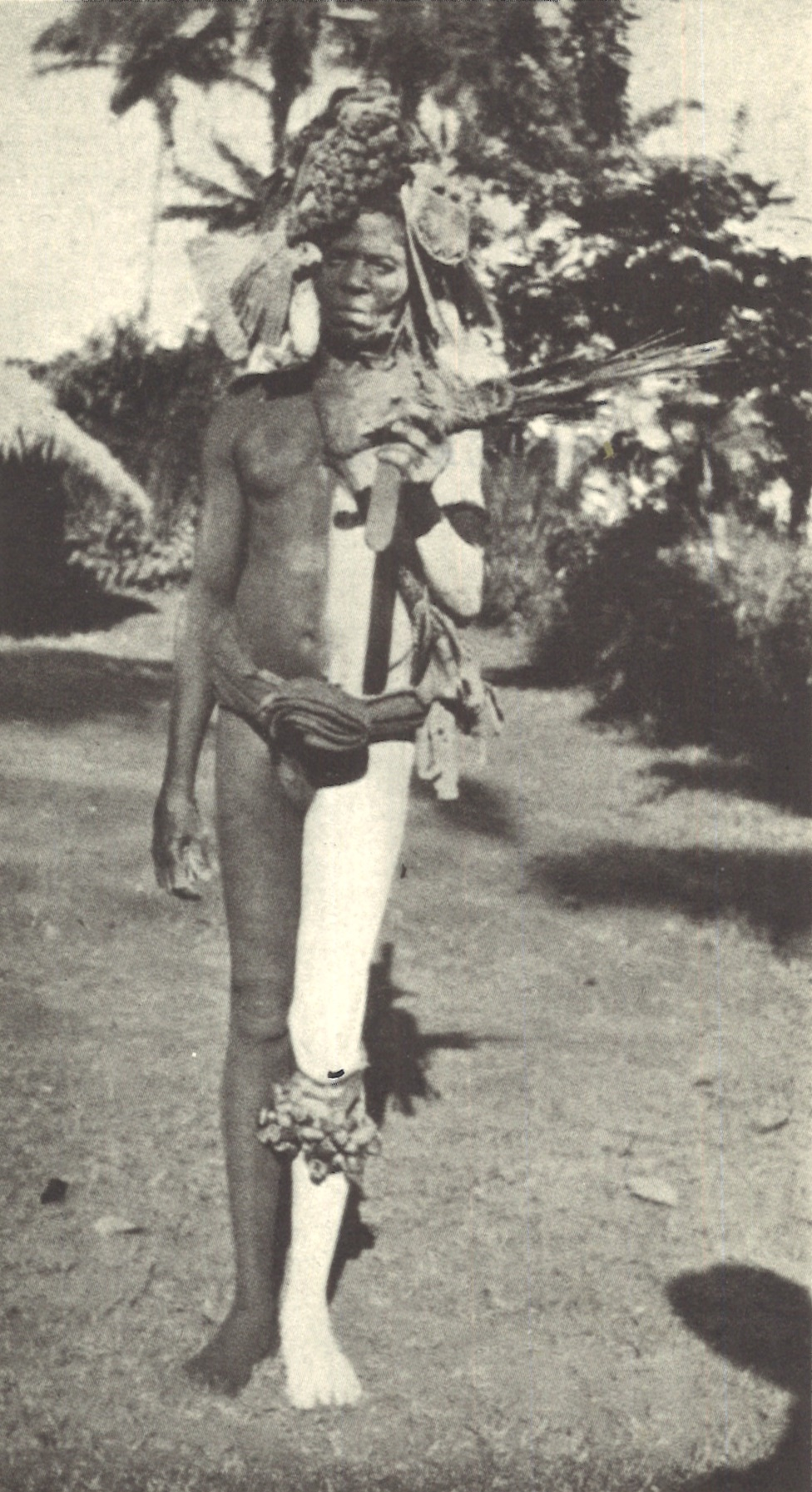
Half man, half spirit

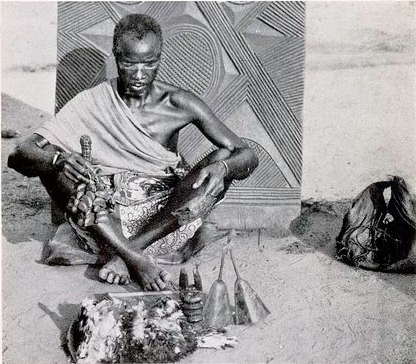
Igbo medicine man

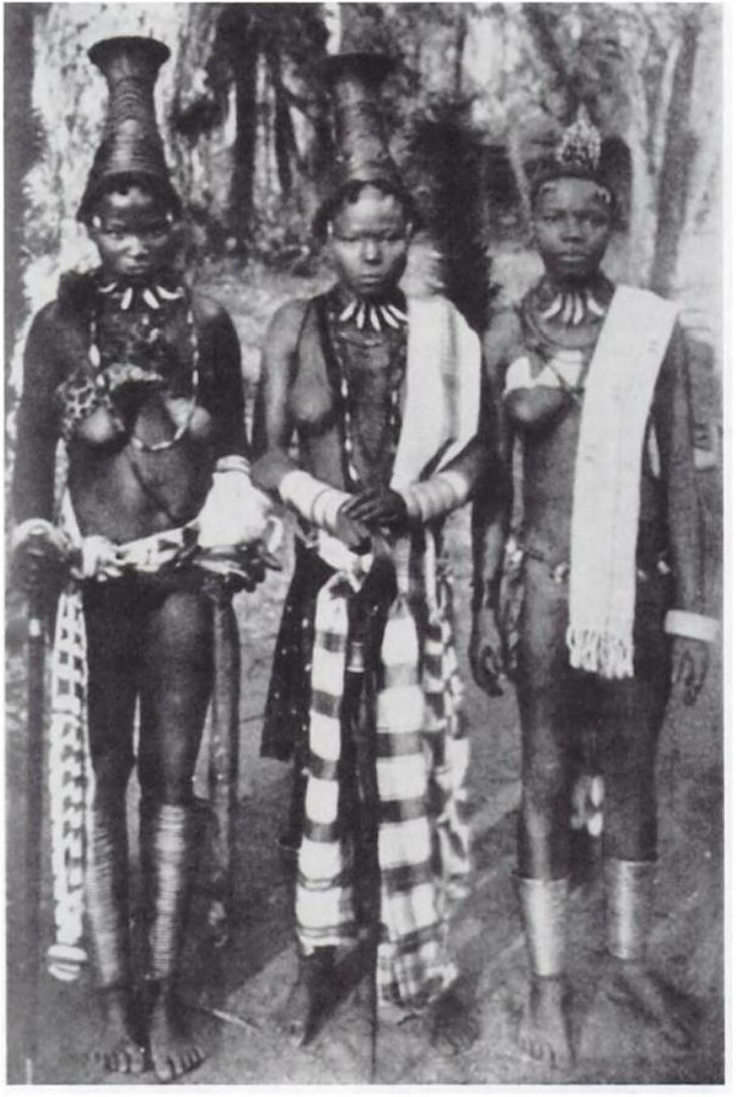
Igbo women: "A proud trio"

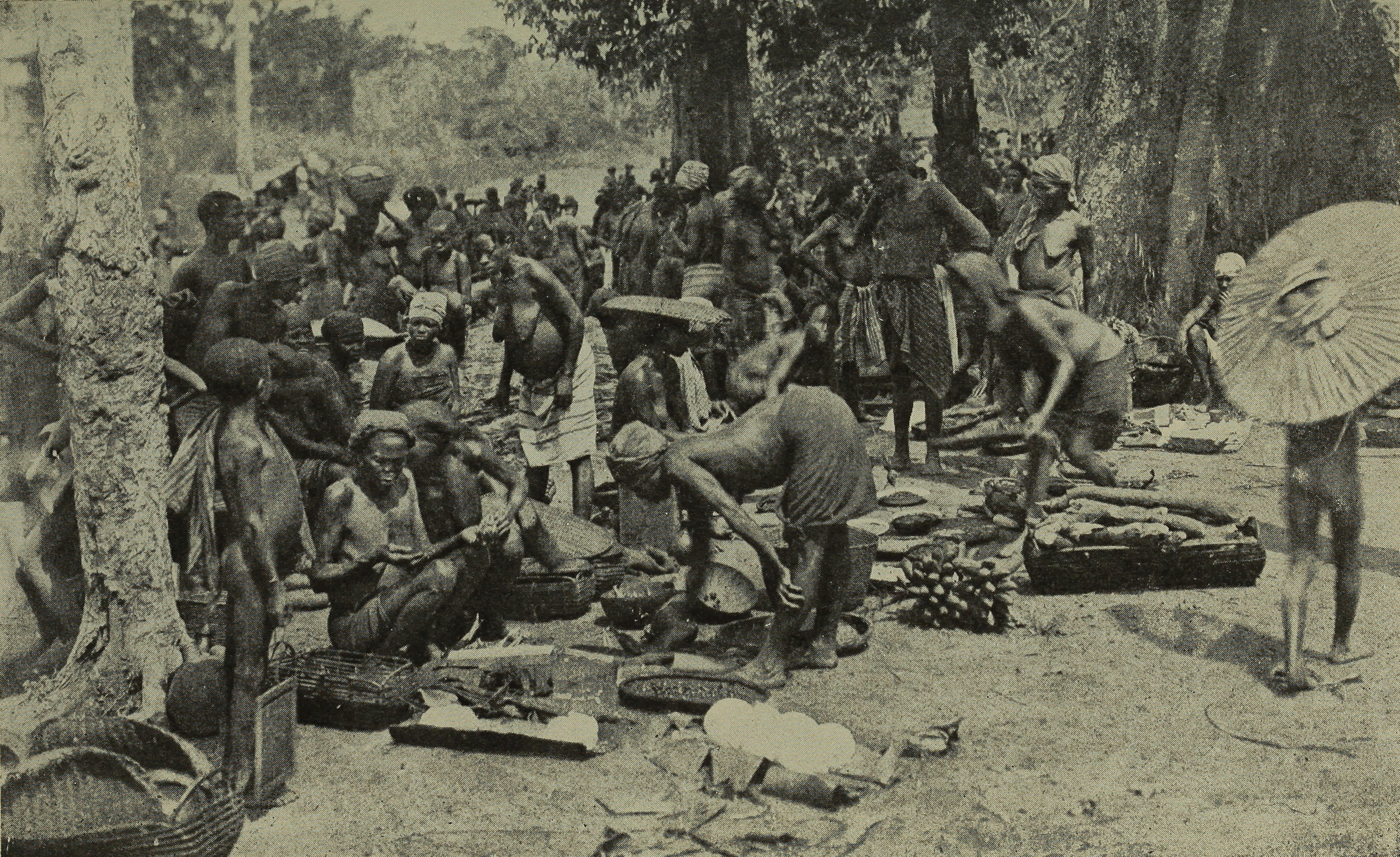
Igbo market: "A busy scene"

Basden published two books of ethnography on the Igbo people of Nigeria:

- George Thomas Basden (1921). Among the Ibos of Nigeria: An Account of the Curious & Interesting Habits, Customs, & Beliefs of a Little Known African People by One who Has for Many Years Lived Amongst Them on Close & Intimate Terms. J. B. Lippincott Company.
- George Thomas Basden (1938). Niger Ibos: A Description of the Primitives Lives, Customs and Animistic Beliefs, Etc., of the Ibo People of Nigeria. Seeley, Service and Company.
