= Buguma =

Town in Rivers State, Nigeria

Buguma Asari
- Town
- Location in Nigeria
- Coordinates: 4°44′N 6°52′E
- Country: Nigeria
- State: Rivers State
- LGA: Asari-Toru

Government
  - Type: Local Government Council Headquarter
  - Chairman/Mayor: Hon. Onengiyeofori George
- Time zone: UTC+1 (WAT)
- Nigerian Postal Code: 504101

Buguma is a large town in Rivers State, Nigeria. It is the headquarters of the Asari-Toru Local Government Area and base of the Kalabari Kingdom, a Nigerian traditional state.

The town has an official post office and a big set of commercial fish ponds set up by the state government. The current mayor, popularly addressed as chairman, of the LGA, which Buguma City is the headquarters, is Hon. Onengiyeofori George

It is also home to the great King Amachree of the Kalabari kingdom.

In 1983, Buguma was designated a city by the Government of Melford Okilo and that status subsists to date.

== Climate ==
In Buguma, the wet season is overcast and warm, the dry season is hot and mostly cloudy, and it is oppressive year round. Over the course of the year, the temperature typically varies from 22 °C (71 °F) to 31 °C (87 °F) and is rarely below 18 °C (64 °F) or above 32 °C (90 °F).

== Notable people ==
- Hilda Dokubo
- Taribo West
- Asari Dokubo
- Tam David-West
- Rex Lawson
