= Etche =

- Local Government Area
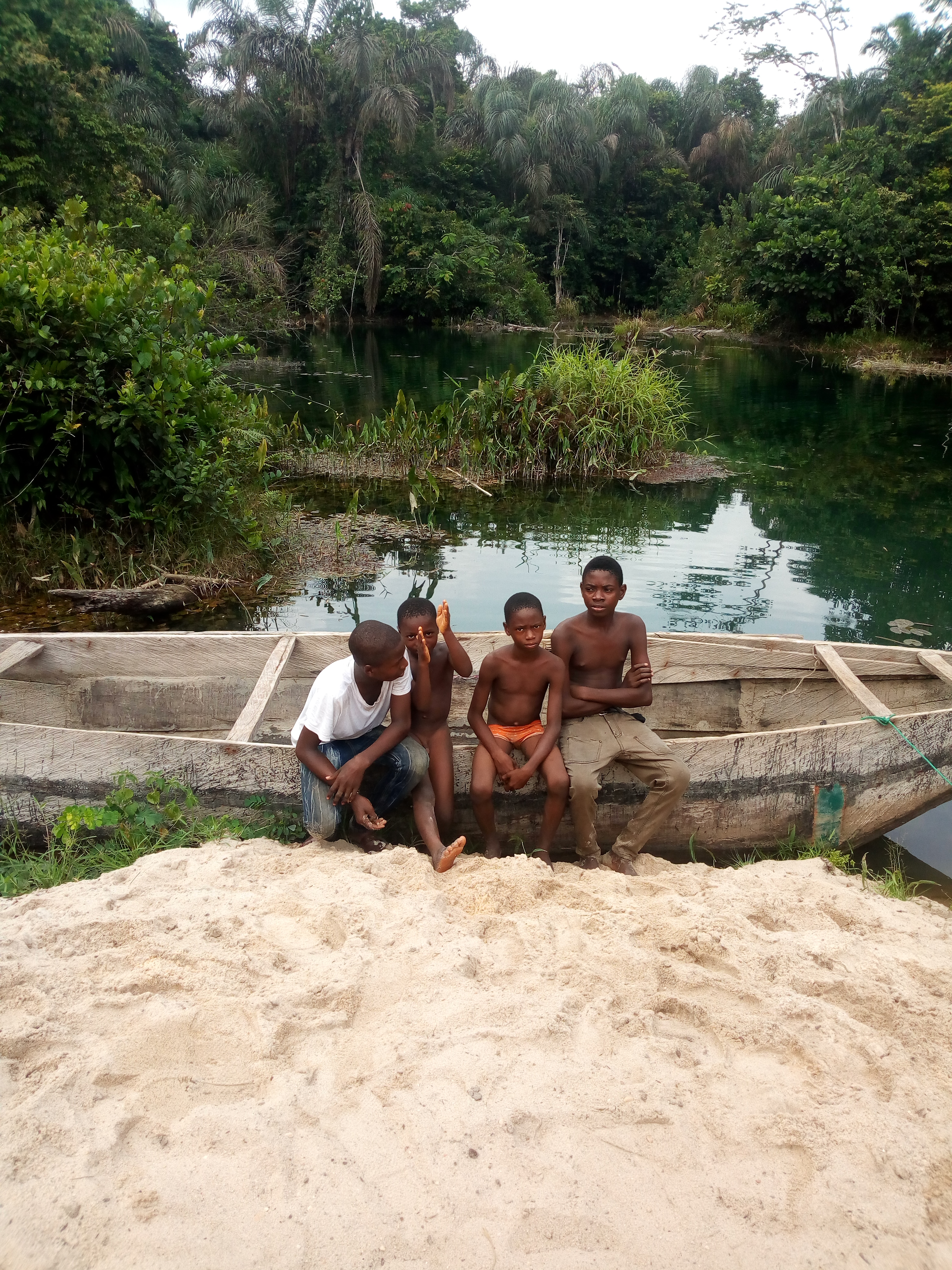
- A river in a village at Etche Rivers State
- Interactive map of Etche
- Etche shown within Nigeria
- Coordinates: 4.99°N 7.05°E
- Country: Nigeria
- State: Rivers State
- Headquarter: Okehi

Government
  - Local Government Chairman: Obinna Anyanwu (PDP)
  - Deputy Local Government Chairman: Gladys Onyekachi Nweke (PDP)
  - Local Government Council: Ward 1: Daniel Amadi (PDP); Ward 2: Cynthia Nwala (PDP); Ward 3: Martins Onyekachi Anderson (PDP); Ward 4: Faith N. Amadi (PDP); Ward 5: Princewill Heshiulor Ahunanya (PDP); Ward 6: Choko Chibuike (PDP); Ward 7: Rosemary Ezeigbo (PDP); Ward 8: Nwachukwu Promise (PDP); Ward 9: Egbegbu Uzondu (PDP); Ward 10: Nwabeke Chigozie (PDP); Ward 11: Nwankwo Gift (PDP); Ward 12: Ugochukwu Nwankwo (PDP); Ward 13: Iheanyichukwu Kingsley (PDP); Ward 14: Bestman Azuonwu (PDP); Ward 15: Loveday Emmanuel (PDP); Ward 16: Nkwocha Janet Nwaugo (PDP); Ward 17: Chika Anokwuru (PDP); Ward 18: ThankGod Egbule (PDP); Ward 19: Amaechi Ihuoma (PDP)

Population
  - Total: 16,347,829
- Time zone: UTC+1 (WAT)
- Language: Igbo

Etche is a local government area in Rivers State , Nigeria with its headquarters at Okehi.

The indigenous Igbo people known as Ndị Echie (also spelled Eche) are primarily found in Etche and Omuma both of which are among the 23 Local Government Areas of Rivers State. They are part of the 13 federal constituencies representing River State in Nigeria's National Assembly and part of the Rivers East Senatorial District. Its people are mostly farmers and Businessmen/Businesswomen, and they speak the Etche dialect of the broader Igbo language.

Okehi is the LGA Council Headquarters and political capital of Etche, while Eberi is the LGA Council Headquarters and political capital of Omuma.

There are 19 political wards in Etche and 10 in Omuma local government areas. There are several communities and towns in Etche, some of which include: Akwu/Obuor, Eberi, Amaji, Opiro, Chokocho, Umuakuru, Igboh, Egwi, Afara, Mba, Igbodo, Ofeh, Ohimogho, Obiohia, Umuogba, Umuajuloke Okehi, Obibi, Ozuzu, Isu, Odufor, Nihi, Okomoko, Ulakwo Umuselem, Umuakonu, Umuanyagu, Okoroagu, Obite, Umuoye, Igboh, Umuechem, Egbeke, Ndashi, Akwa, Akwukabi, Elelem, Owu, Umuaturu, Ogida, Aloma, Odagwa, etc.

== Economy ==
Umuechem in Etche is one of the oil producing communities in Nigeria since the beginning of exploration in the area in 1958. Today, Etche has over 250 producing oil wells and a host 3 of flow stations. It is also said to have the largest deposit of natural gas, south of the Niger river. The people of Etche are mostly engaged in agriculture, earning the nickname 'the food basket of the state'. Etche is one of the host communities of the government-owned multi-billion naira palm oil production company Risonpalm, as well as Delta Rubber Production Company. In recent times, real estate development has grown in the area with rapid expansion going on in Igboh-Agwuruasa, Ulakwo-Umuselem, and Okehi Clans. Cassava, plantain, banana and yam are important crops. Agricultural plantation (notably Rubber, palm oil, pineapple, and plantain) was encouraged by the then Eastern Regional government of Nigeria, but this has since lost steam. Agriculture is mostly not mechanized and the use of tractors for farming these crops has dropped slightly in the 1986–2004 period.

Shell Petroleum Development Company, the dominant oil operator in the area since the late 1950s, has only funded a largely ineffective and inefficient cassava processing mill at Umuebulu, and in 2000 it attempted albeit abysmally to provide training to local women in operation and management of the mill. Palm oil production by smallholders is a significant part of the economy.

== Political unrest ==
In October 1990, a demonstration was held in Umuechem, Etche to demand social amenities and compensation for oil pollution. State security agents reacted with tear gas and gunfire. 50 people died and about 550 houses were destroyed. The April 2003 national elections were marked by serious violence and intimidation in the Etche LGA, seriously compromising the free voters' process. In a 2007 report, Human Rights Watch said that "in recent years Etche has earned a degree of unwelcome notoriety due to allegations of corruption, thuggery, and murder leveled against politicians and public office holders from the area." The report stated that health and education facilities were in an advanced state of physical decay, with funds allocated for staffing and renovation being diverted for other purposes. In January 2009, the Etche legislative council impeached three of their members for "irrational and unconscionable behaviour, gross misconduct, misappropriation of legislative funds and abuse of office."

A training camp for ex-militants was established in Okehi in Etche LGA, teaching skills such as welding and fabrication, fitting, seafaring/marine, business and commerce and so on. In October 2009, 200 of the students demanded their allowances, threatening to return to the creeks to cause havoc if unpaid.

== Recent developments ==
In August 2009, a Marriage Registration Centre was opened in the LGA. In September 2009 the Niger Delta Development Commission opened a free medical mission in Omuma Local Government Council.
