= Omuma, Rivers State =

Omuma
- LGA
- Interactive map of Omuma
- Location within Nigeria Location within Africa
- Coordinates: 5°N 7°E
- Country: Nigeria
- State: Rivers State
- Date created: 1 October 1996
- Seat: Eberi

Government
  - Local Government Chairman: Christian Nwaiwu(PDP)
  - Deputy Local Government Chairman: Ubani Mary (PDP)
  - Local Government Council: Ward 1: Umesi Obioma (PDP); Ward 2: Promise Reginald (PDP); Ward 3: Ekpendu Prince Eze (PDP); Ward 4: Elike Nwaobia Samuel (PDP); Ward 5: Henry Okechukwu (PDP); Ward 6: Ugochukwu Orji (PDP); Ward 7: Cyril Oluo (PDP); Ward 8: Nwaodu Nnanyibu (PDP); Ward 9: Onyebuchi Onyeche (PDP); Ward 10: Okpoko Lucky (PDP)

Area
  - Total: 170 km^{2} (66 sq mi)

Population (2006)
  - Total: 100,366
  - Density: 590/km^{2} (1,500/sq mi)
- Time zone: UTC+1 (WAT)
- Postal code: 512

Omuma is a Local Government Area in Rivers State, South South geopolitical zone of Nigeria. Its headquarters are in the town of Eberi.

It has an area of 170 km^{2} (66 sq mi) and a population of 100,366 at the 2006 census.

The postal code of the area is 512. The local government area is made up of several towns and villages such as Umuabali, Umuroke, Eberi, Egbelu, Umuokwa, Umuoroyo and Umudik. A number of festival such as the Ogwu Ekpeye festival are held in omuma local government area. Christianity is widely practiced in Omuma local government area. With the average humidity level of 78 percent in the LGA, it hosts a number of Rivers and tributaries. it's has a vibrant trade sector and hosts a number of markets such as the Eketa market where a variety of commodities are bought and sold. Omuma local government area is also an agricultural hub with crops such as yam, maize, Palm oil and vegetables. Other economic activities engaged in by the people include fishing, crafts making, lumbering and hunting.
