= Ogba language =

Igboid language of Nigeria

Ogba
- Ọgbà
- Region: Rivers, Delta and Imo States, Nigeria
- Ethnicity: Ogba People; Igbo people
- Native speakers: 334,000 (2020)
- Language family: Niger–Congo?: Atlantic–Congo; Volta-Congo; Volta–Niger; yeai; Igboid; Nuclear Igboid; Ogba

Language codes
- ISO 639-3: ogc
- Glottolog: ogba1241

Ogba (also Olu Ogba, mobu onu Ogbah) is an Igboid language spoken by Ogba people of Nigeria mostly in River State. They are part of the Ogba/ Egbema/Ndoni Local Government Area in Rivers State. The king is referred to as the Eze-ogba and was politically influenced to change the title as 'Oba' just as the Bini people refer to theirs. Annually they celebrate the 'Egwu ogba' festival. The largest festival in the Egi land.

== Writing system ==
Ogba alphabet
Uppercase
A	B	Ch	D	E	Ẹ	F	G	H	I	Ị	J	K	L	M	N	O	Ọ	P	R	S	T	U	Ụ	V	W	Y	Z
Lowercase
a	b	ch	d	e	ẹ	f	g	h	i	ị	j	k	l	m	n	o	ọ	p	r	s	t	u	ụ	v	w	y	z

Certain digraphs and trigraphs are also used.

The tones are indicated with diacritics:

- the high tone is indicated by the absence of a diacritic:⟨a, e, ẹ, i, ị, o, ọ, u, ụ⟩ ;
- the low tone is indicated with the grave accent : ⟨à, è, ẹ̀, ì, ị̀, ò, ọ̀, ù, ụ̀⟩ ;
- the falling tone is indicated with the circumflex accent : ⟨â, ê, ệ, î, ị̂, ô, ộ, û, ụ̂⟩ ;
- the downstep is indicated with the macron : ⟨ā, ē, ẹ̄, ī, ị̄, ō, ọ̄, ū, ụ̄⟩.

== Phonology ==
Ogbah vowels
	Front	Back
Close	i ɪ	ʊ u
Close-mid	e	o
Open-mid		ɔ
Open	a	
