= Ahoada West =

Area in Rivers State, Nigeria

- LGA
- Interactive map of Ahoada West
- Location within Nigeria Location within Africa
- Coordinates: 4°48′N 7°00′E
- Country: Nigeria
- State: Rivers State
- Date created: 1996
- Seat: Akinima

Government
  - Local Government Chairman: Hon. Iyekor Ikporo (APP)
  - Deputy Local Government Chairman: Hon. Onisojikume Ayonoadu (APP)
- Time zone: UTC+1 (WAT)

Ahoada West (also spelt Ehuda West) is a Local Government Area of Rivers State, Nigeria, located Northwest of Port Harcourt. It was extracted in 1996 in the General Sani Abacha military regime from the old Ahoada Local Government that makes up the present Orashi Region of Rivers State. Its seat is in the town of Akinima.

The Local Government Area (LGA) comprises some Ekpeye speaking communities (mostly from the Ubie and Ibuduya clan) and Engenni and Ogbogolo communities. Thus there are three distinct languages namely, Ekpeye, Engenni and Ogbogolo.

Ahoada West is one of the popular Local Government Areas in Rivers State which seats in the South South Region of Nigeria, and they are also have rich cultural heritage.

The Orashi River criss-crosses which is at the lower basin of the Niger River, the entire Local Government area and its vegetation is mainly a high dense rain forest. Thus, the occupations of the Ahoada West people are mainly farming, fishing, and hunting.

Ahoada West Local Government Area is bounded by the following LGAs: Ogba/Egbema/Ndoni Local Government Area, Abua/Odual Local Government Area, Ahoada East Local Government Area on the east, we have Besini and Yenagoa both of Bayelsa State on the North and West respectively. The boundary between Rivers and Bayelsa States from the west is located at Engenni.

== Towns and Villages ==
1. Abarikpo

2. Agbo/Akogbologba

3. Akaramirin

4. Akinima

5. Akoh

6. Ala-Ahoada

7. Anakpa

8. Anwurugbokor

9. Better Land

10. Ebiriba/lkodi

11. Ebiro

12. Edeeha

13. Edeoha

14. Edugberi

15. Ekpene

16. Emeri

17. Ibrass

18. Idaki

19. Idu-Obosiuku

20. Idu-Osobile

21. Igovia

22. Ihuaba

23. Ihuechi

24. Thugboko

25. Ihuowo

26. Ijuaje

27. Ikata

28. Isua

29. Ususu

30. Joinkrama

31. Kunusha

32. Mbiama

33. Membe

34. Oboh

35. Obolobolo

36. Obumeze

37. Ochigba

38. Odawu

39. Odereke

40. Odiabidi

41. Odiapiti

42. Odido

43. Odleke

44. Odiemudie

45. Odiemusana

46. Odlerenguroji

47. Odiokwu

48. Ododi

49. Ogbede

50. Ogbelle

51. Ogbo

52. Ogoda

53. Ogua-Akmima

54. Ohigbo

55. Okarki

56. Okebe

57. Okogbe

58. Okolobiama

59. Okparaki

60. Okpoga-Ulo-Udo

61. Okponmini

62. Oluokobo

63. Oporowo

64. Orija

65. Oruama

66. Orupata

67. Oshi

68. Oshiebele

69. Oshika

70. Oshugboko

71. Oyiba I & II

72. Ozachi

73. Ubarama

74. Ubeta

75. Ubie

76. Ubio

77. Ukerede

78. Upata

79. Upatabo

80. Uyalama

81. Egboama

82. Kala ogbogolo Idu-Ekpeye

83. Opu ogbogolo

== Climate/Geography ==
The Ahoada West local government region experiences an average yearly temperature of 27 degrees Celsius or 80 degrees Fahrenheit and an estimated humidity of 88%. There are several rivers and tributaries in the area, the most notable of which being the Orashi river.
