= Ahoada East =

- LGA
- Interactive map of Ahoada East
- Location within Nigeria Location within Africa
- Coordinates: 5°06′N 6°42′E
- Country: Nigeria
- State: Rivers State
- Headquarters: Ahoada
- Date created: 1996

Government
  - Local Government Chairman: Benjamin Eke (PDP)
  - Deputy Local Government Chairman: Iyemewe Rose Ogbogo-Ololube (PDP)
  - Local Government Council: Ward 1: Abraham Beatrice (PDP); Ward 2: Bright Uwandu (PDP); Ward 3: Uzoma Miller (PDP); Ward 4: Chisa Aguiyi (PDP); Ward 5: Alabi Umegbewe (PDP); Ward 6: Ogbenma Idalunimulu C (PDP); Ward 7: Nnamdi Aguyi Abule (PDP); Ward 8: Jeff Leventis (PDP); Ward 9: Alali Justice Livingstone (PDP); Ward 10: Kingsley Igwe (PDP); Ward 11: Thankgod Unwe Bernard (PDP); Ward 12: Nicholas Reuben Bob (PDP); Ward 13: Chituru Edi (PDP)

Area
  - Land: 341 km^{2} (132 sq mi)
- Time zone: UTC+1 (WAT)

Ahoada East (also spelt Ehuda East) is a Local Government Area of Rivers State, Nigeria, located northwest of Port Harcourt. Its seat is in the city of Ahoada, located within the Niger Delta region. Towns in Ahoada East include Odiabidi, Edeoha, Idoke, Ogbo, Abarikpo, and Ihugbogo.

== Climate/Geography ==
The average temperature and humidity of Ahoada East are expected to be 27 degrees Celsius or 80.6 degrees Fahrenheit and 88 percent, respectively. The region has two distinct seasons: the dry and the rainy. The rainy season is distinguished by frequent and intense downpours.

== Commissioning of road ==
In 2021, the former governor of the State Nyesom Wike commissioned a road in Ahoada.The road is of economic importance to the Ahoada Town, due to the linkage of all the local roads to the main road commissioned.
