= 2008 Shell Bodo Oil Spill =

Environmental disaster in Nigeria

Bodo is a rural coastal community in Rivers State, Nigeria with a population of about 69,000.

In 2008, two significant spills from the Trans-Niger pipeline, a pipeline operated by Royal Dutch Shell, contaminated the local waterways and mangroves. According to members of the Bodo community, the first spill began on August 28, 2008. The second spill began on December 7, 2008. Together, at least 259,560 barrels of oil were spilled, a volume comparable to the Exxon Valdez oil spill.

The spill contamination caused widespread environmental destruction, including water contamination, soil infertility, loss of biodiversity, and mangrove destruction. Contamination to food and water sources caused a severe decline in public health and livelihood destruction, particularly the local fishing and farming economy.

The litigation between the Bodo community and Shell is ongoing.

== Spill details ==
On August 28, 2008, a spill was recorded by members of the Bodo community and reported to the Nigerian Ministry of Environment and National Oil Spill Detection and Response Agency (NOSDRA). Shell's report states the spill began on October 8, 2008. The cause of the spill was disputed. In lawsuits filed by the community, the cause was attributed to negligent maintenance of a pipeline over 50 years old. Shell attributed the leak to sabotage and bunkering practices. The spill flowed into the Bodo Creek until stopping on November 7, 2008.

The volume of the first spill is disputed. According to Joint Investigative Visit (JIV) reports, Shell claimed that 1,640 barrels were spilled. However, an independent investigation led by Accufacts Inc. estimated a volume range between 103,000 and 311,000 barrels.

The undisputed start date of the second spill was December 7, 2008, lasting until February 21, 2009. Shell claimed that 2,503 barrels were spilled, about 52% greater than the first spill. There was no independent investigation conducted for the second spill, as in order for NOSDRA to investigate the spill, they depended on oil companies for transportation and logistical support to reach spill sites. Researchers argued that this lack of capacity gave oil companies substantial control over the logistics and technical data in the official investigation process.

Additionally, there was no external evidence for independent experts to access. While there was no independent investigation for the second spill, researchers extrapolated that the total cumulative volume of both spills was between 259,560 and 472,700 barrels.

== Environmental impacts ==
The Bodo creek ecosystem consists of a complex network of mangrove swamps, brackish water creeks, and island forests spanning 9,230 hectares. Traditionally, this ecosystem supported a strong farming and fishing economy, often referred to as "the fish basket of Gokana".

The impacts of the spill contamination were catastrophic for the local environment and biodiversity. Thousands of hectares of mangrove forests were destroyed, while post-spill scientific surveys revealed a 91% reduction of animal diversity living in the sediments. Previously common shellfish populations in the creek were eliminated, including the common periwinkle, oyster, bloody cockle, dog whelk, swimming crab, purple mangrove crab, pink shrimp, and tiger prawn. Common fish species (mullets, snappers, tilapias, cichlids, croakers, grouper, mudskippers) died directly from oil toxicity or migrated to cleaner waters downstream. Planktonic organisms, the base of the aquatic food chain, suffered decreases.

In the water, researchers found concentrations of the hazardous trace elements cadmium, chromium, cobalt, lead, manganese, and nickel. Concentrations of iron, zinc, and copper were also found at levels exceeding the World Health Organization guidelines for both surface and drinking water. The contamination also spread to groundwater wells. A 2011 United Nations Environmental Programme (UNEP) report found hydrocarbon concentrations exceeding drinking standards in over 24 local water wells.

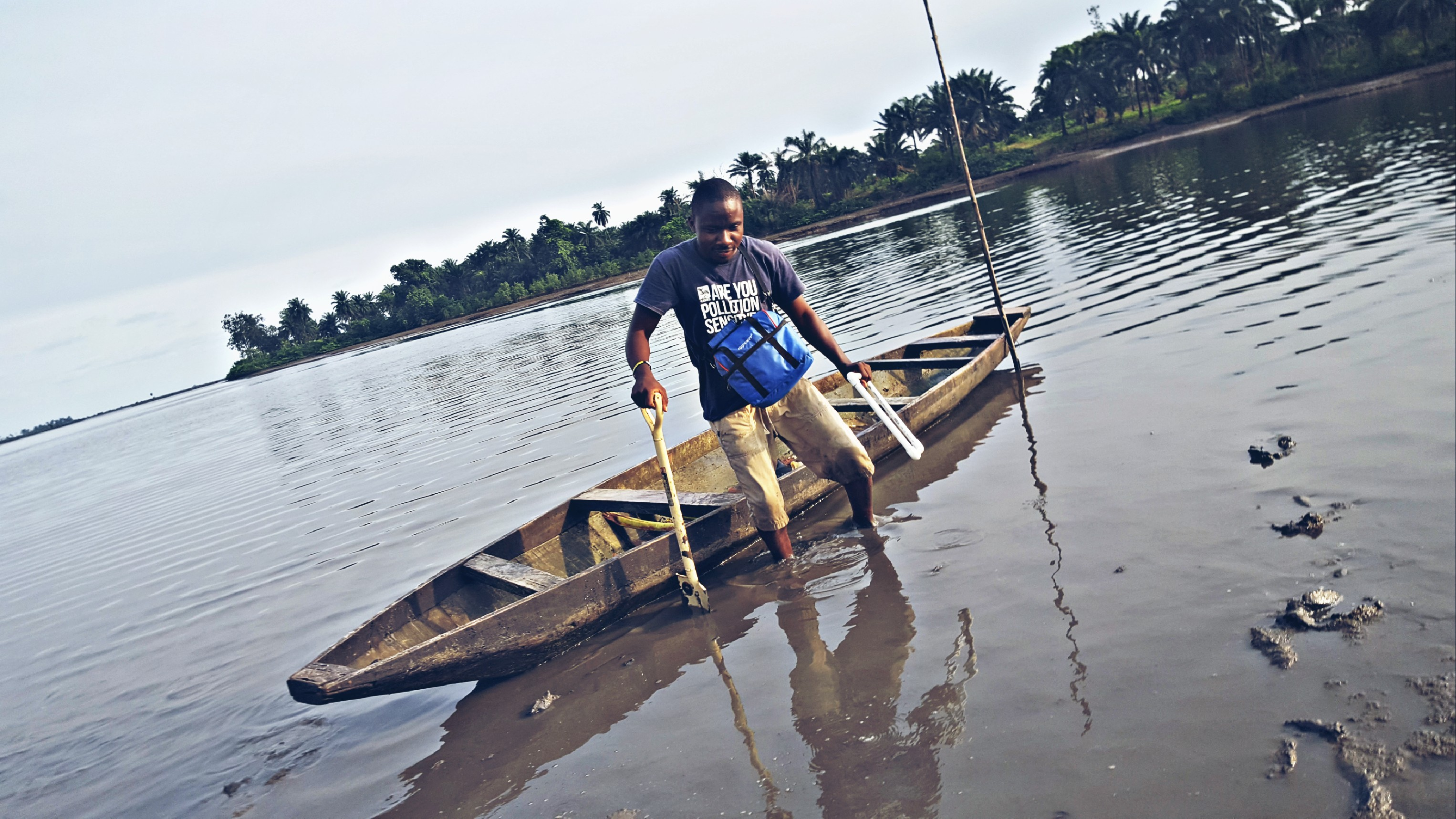
A researcher returning from a sampling expedition in Bodo Creek

In the soil, the heavy hydrocarbon concentrations destroyed vital nutrients for plants to grow and disrupted soil nutrient cycles. The contaminated land lost all agricultural viability, meaning community members could no longer grow vital crops used for food and sold at markets such as cassava, okra, peppers, fruits, and vegetables. Medicinal plants that the community previously relied upon were also lost.

== Legal aftermath ==
Following the spills, on May 2, 2008, Royal Dutch Shell's first offer of compensation consisted of 50 bags of rice, beans, garri; 50 cartons of sugar, milk powder, tea, tomatoes; and 50 tins of groundnut oil.

On March 12, 2012, a lawsuit by 15,000 Bodo community members was filed in the London High Court against Royal Dutch Shell, demanding compensation for lost livelihoods and the immediate clean-up of their environment.

On June 20, 2014, a landmark ruling by a UK judge established that Shell could be held liable for damages caused by bunkering and sabotage because of failure to protect and maintain its infrastructure.

In January 2015, Shell agreed to an out-of-court settlement of £55 million to fund cleanup initiatives and to compensate 15,603 families of the Bodo community. The funded cleanup operation, which was also sponsored by the Dutch government, was called the Bodo Mediation Initiative.

Following the settlement, several cleanup disputes emerged. In October 2016, community members claimed that Shell had not yet begun the cleanup process. In June 2017, Shell claimed the community members were interfering with cleanup processes, and sought to permanently strike out the lawsuit. The UK court dismissed this claim.

On March 24, 2018, a UK judge ruled that the Bodo community has the right to continue litigation if the quality of the cleanup process was not sufficient.

Concerns of poor cleanup quality led to multiple requests by the community to have an independent expert review, which Shell refused. In May 2023, the Bodo community claimed the cleanup was insufficient, and the UK court granted the community to a trial on the adequacy of the cleanup.

On March 13, 2025, Shell Petroleum Development Company of Nigeria was sold to Renaissance Africa Energy Company Limited (RAEC). Moving forward, the ongoing litigation will be against Renaissance.
