= Ihuo =

Coordinates: 05°34′N 07°06′E

Iho is an autonomous community in southeastern Nigeria, in Ikeduru, Imo state. It is located near Owerri. The name may be written and pronounced as Iho. The majority of inhabitants of this community refer to it as Iho-Dimeze and are sometimes referred to as "Dimeze"

== Geography ==
Iho Dimeze is made up of nineteen villages: Umuishi, Ishiafor Okpuala, Amukamara, Umuakpim, Ndiokwu, Obi-Umuori, Umunomo, Umuejike, Akpaka, Umuechem, Nowhere, Umushioke, Ezekwenjo, Umudim, Amaokwe-Okpuala, Umudimoche, Amueje, Umuezeala, and Umuagwu. Iho Dimeze is bordered by Akabo, Uzoagba, Ngugo, Atta (in Ikeduru LGA), Ogwa, and Mbieri (in Mbaitoli LGA).

== Facilities ==
Iho Dimeze has one of the most prominent markets in Ikeduru and Mbaitoli LGAs called "Eke Ije Dibia" (popularly "Eke Iho").

Workers from other LGAs and states find it difficult to leave. Workers in other LGAs still live in and commute to and from Iho. Some named their children "Ihomezie" or "Ihomezirim", meaning "Iho blessed me".

== Economy ==
Iho Dimeze people are predominantly farmers, traders and teachers.

Ihuo is the headquarters of the Ikeduru Local Government Area. Petroleum exploration in Africa started at Iho-Dimeze, in Igboland by Shell D’arcy in the 1930s. Iho holds a large deposit of hydrocarbons that have not yet been tapped. The first commercial field was discovered in 1956 at Oloibiri in the Niger Delta.

== History ==
The late ruler of Iho Dimeze was His Royal Highness Eze Ernest O. Onwuegbu Dimeze I of Iho Dimeze. Eze Onwuegbu ensured that traditions were maintained and respected.

Ihuo has served as a home for many indigenes. A son of Iho Dimeze, David, commented that in spite of the role played by this community, it has been neglected by various administrations, at both local and state levels. Mazi Obinna Edoziem noted that no son or daughter of Iho Dimeze has been elected or appointed as Ikeduru LG Chairman, or supervisor at the LG level, by either military or democratic administrations, despite the fact that the headquarters of Ikeduru LGA is located in Iho.

== Festivals ==
The people of Iho Dimeze are close-knit and celebrate many festivals and gatherings throughout the year.

Many years before, the people of Iho Dimeze celebrated "Onwa Asa" and villages such as Umuokoro and Umuawom celebrated it as the "Orisha festival". The influence of Christianity has lessened interest in the festivals. In April of each year, the people of Iho Dimeze celebrate the "Isu Achara Festival" (Bush Burning Festival), where Okpuala and Amararuru Villages exhibit their traditional right to fix a date for the festival and display their masquerade dance (Igba Nmanwu). This festival attracts visitors from near and far. Many youths look forward to the festival every year and travel from Lagos, Port- Harcourt and Aba. "Ukwa" (breadfruit), a food presented to guests, is one of the most valuable foods in Igboland. Another event celebrated by Amarauru and Okpuala villages is the "Festival of Nmanya Ama", or "Nmii Ama".

== Education ==
Iho Dimeze has one Secondary School, Iho Comprehensive Secondary School, and four elementary schools: Iho Central School, Iho Community School, Iho Community Primary School, and Iho Primary School.

== Religion ==
The major churches are the Holy Trinity Church, Saint Mary's Catholic Church, St. Monica's Catholic Church, Christ Church Okpuala, Cherubim, Seraphim, and Holiness Evangelistic Church.
