= OML29 =

Type of oil mining license in Nigeria

OML 29 (Oil Mining Lease 29)
- Country: Nigeria
- Block: OML29
- Offshore/onshore: Onshore
- Operators: Aiteo Eastern Exploration and Production Company
- Partners: NNPC

Production
- Producing formations: Agbada formations

OML 29

OML 29 is also known as Oil Mining Licence 29. Oil Mining Licence OML is one of the two types of licences issued to oil producers in Nigeria "with validity periods ranging from 5 to 20 years respectively." OML29 is a large block located in the southeastern Niger Delta containing 11 oil and gas fields. OML29 stretches over an area of 983 square kilometres. It includes the Nembe Oil Field, Santa Barbara Oil Field and Okoroba Oil Fields. It also include related facilities like the Nembe Creek Trunk Line NCTL. A 100 kilometres long pipeline with a capacity of 600 thousand barrels per day.

== Historical overview ==
The initial lease was granted by the Federal Government of Nigeria to Shell Petroleum Development Company in 1964 and renewed after twenty-five (25) years in July 1989, for a term of thirty (30) years expiring in June 2019. OML29 licence was formally held by Shell Petroleum Development Company of Nigeria Ltd Joint Venture (SPDC), comprising Total E&P Nigeria Limited and Nigerian Agip Oil Company Limited.

In September 2015, Aiteo Eastern Exploration and Production (E&P) Company Limited, a subsidiary of Aiteo Group announced their acquisition of (OML) 29 and the Nembe Creek Trunk Line (NCTL) and related facilities in the Eastern Niger Delta from the Shell Petroleum Development Company of Nigeria Limited (SPDC) at $1.7 billion.

== Production ==
OML29 consists of 9 fields including the iconic Oloibiri Oilfield (1st Commercial Oil Discovery in Nigeria) and holds 2.2 billion barrels of oil equivalent, BOE, while Its hydrocarbon fields could deliver as much as 160,000 barrels of oil per day, and 300 million cubic feet (8.5 million cubic metres) per day at standard conditions at peak output. It has 240,000 barrels of oil per day and 50 million ft^{3} (1.4 million m^{3}) per day at standard conditions of installed production capacity most of which have been impacted by sabotage, vandalism and theft within the Niger Delta Region. OML29 is currently producing from three fields (Nembe, Santa Barbara and Odeama Creeks) with over 120 thousand barrels (19,000 cubic metres) of oil per day production potential.

OML29 produced around 43,000 barrels of oil equivalent per day (100 per cent) in 2014. Wood Mackenzie, a global leader in commercial intelligence for the energy, metals and mining industries describes OML29 as “the biggest producing onshore oil field in the ‘SPDC/ NNPC’ JV”, and produced on average, around the equivalent of 43,000 barrels (6,800 m^{3}) of oil per day during 2014.

According to the Africa Oil & Gas Report, OML29 averaged about 50,000 barrels (7,900 m^{3}) of oil per day until mid 2015, with 22,500 barrels (3,580 m^{3}) of oil per day net to AITEO, and has now gone down to 35,000 barrels (5,600 m^{3}) of oil per day.

In March 2017, Aiteo Group announced that production levels at OML 29 had peaked at 90,000 barrels (14,000 m^{3}) per day, tripling existing production records for the onshore block. Announcing the news, Aiteo's CEO, Benedict Peters, highlighted several existing and developing projects engineered to raise asset production at OML 29 to over 150,000 barrels (24,000 m^{3}) per day.
