= Petroleum industry in Nigeria =

Oil production in Nigeria

Nigeria is the largest oil and gas producer in Africa. Crude oil from the Niger Delta basin mostly comes in two types: light, and comparatively heavy – the lighter crude has API gravity of approximately 36 while the heavier crude has API gravity range 20–25. Both types are paraffinic and low in sulfur. Nigeria's economy and budget have been largely supported from income and revenues generated from the petroleum industry since 1960. Statistics as at February 2021 show that the Nigerian oil sector contributes to about 9% of the GDP of the nation.

The operation of fossil fuel industries has left a significant environmental impact on the Niger delta, with oil spills, air pollution and destruction of sensitive waterways and wetlands in areas where oil production is common. Also the development of the oil industry in Nigeria has had significant conflicts: control of the industry was a contributing factor in the Nigerian Civil War, and multiple human rights groups have documented repression and chronic underdevelopment in the regions directly connected to the oil industry.

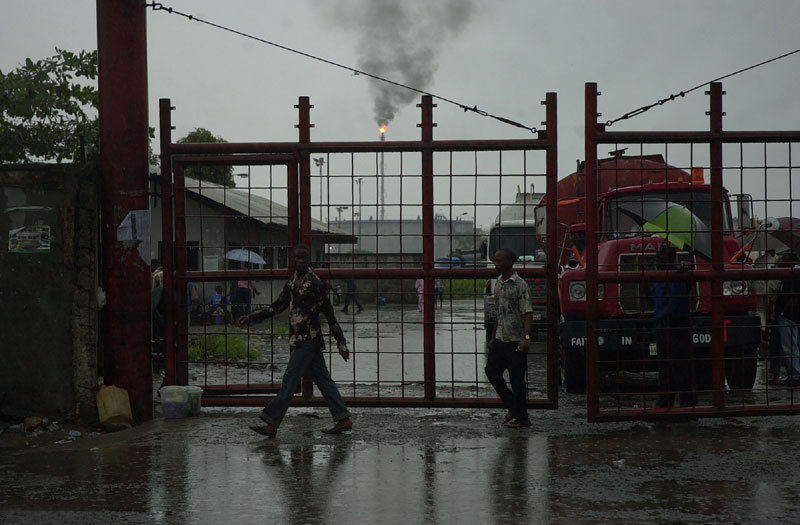
The gates of the oil refinery in Port Harcourt

== History of oil exploration ==
The history of oil exploration in Nigeria goes back to 1903, when the Nigerian Bitumen Corporation conducted exploratory work in the country. At the onset of World War I, the firm's operations were stopped. Due to lack of technological and financial resources of small oil companies, large and strong other oil companies took over the exploration of commercial oil in the country. Thereafter, licenses were given to D'Arcy Exploration Company and Whitehall Petroleum, but neither company found oil of commercial value and they returned their licenses in 1923. A new license covering 920,000 square kilometres (357,000 square miles) was given to Shell D'arcy Petroleum Development Company of Nigeria, a consortium of Shell and BP (then known as Anglo-Iranian). The company began exploratory work in 1937.

The association was granted license to explore oil all over the territory of Nigeria but, the acreage allotted to the company in the original license was reduced in 1951 and then, between 1955 and 1957. Drilling activities started in 1951 with the first test well drilled in Owerri area. Oil was discovered in non-commercial quantities at Akata, near Eket in 1953. Prior to the Akata find, the company had spent around £6 million on exploratory activities in the country. In the pursuit of commercially available petroleum, Shell-BP found oil in Oloibiri, Nigeria, in 1956. Other important oil wells discovered during the period were Afam and Bomu in Ogoni territory. Production of crude oil began in 1957, and in 1960, a total of 847,000 tonnes of crude oil was exported. Towards the end of the 1950s, non-British firms were granted license to explore for oil: Mobil in 1955, Tenneco in 1960, Gulf Oil, later Chevron in 1961, Agip in 1962, and Elf in 1962. Prior to the discovery of oil, Nigeria (like many other African countries) strongly relied on agricultural exports to supply its economy. However, after nearly 50 years searching for oil in the country, Shell-BP discovered oil at Oloibiri in the Niger Delta. The first oil field began production in 1958.

After that, the economy of Nigeria might have been expected to experience strong growth. However, competition for the profits from oil, coupled with the government keeping almost all of the profits for themselves, left little economic benefit for the people. In one interview with locals who were young at the time of oil discover, the blame was placed largely on the government and the greed of bureaucrats:

"I don't only blame the whites that came here, what about the government? People in the government get nearly all the money from the economy."

Many citizens of Nigeria believe that they have not been able to experience the economic benefits derived from oil extraction in Nigeria. In large part due to Nigerian government officials remaining majority shareholders in the profits created by the production of Nigerian oil, leading to government capturing of nearly all oil production, and citizens not seeing socio-economic benefits.

The president of Nigeria as of 2023, Bola Tinubu, has taken steps to privatize the oil and gas industry in Nigeria. Decades of government ownership and control of the industry left the people at large impoverished and unable to experience any of the economic gain related to oil and gas exploration and extraction, Tinubu hopes that privatization and free markets will allow for greater equity in the space that has been rife with corruption since the 1950s in Nigeria when petroleum products were first discovered.

== Production and exploration ==
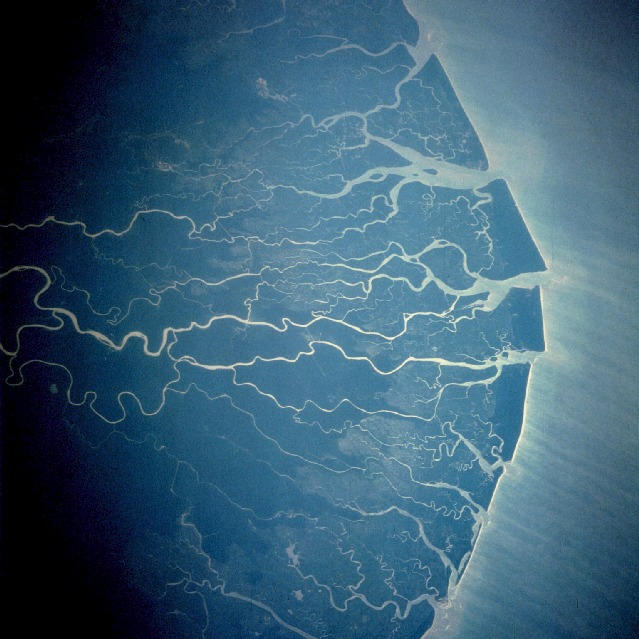
Satellite image of Niger Delta

As of 2000, oil and gas exports accounted for more than 98% of export earnings and about 83% of federal government revenue, as well as generating more than 14% of its GDP. It also provides 95% of foreign exchange earnings, and about 65% of government budgetary revenues.

Nigeria's proven oil reserves are estimated by the United States Energy Information Administration (EIA) at between 16 and 22 billion barrels (2.5×10^{9} and 3.5×10^{9} m^{3}), but other sources claim that there could be as much as 35.3 billion barrels (5.61×10^{9} m^{3}). Its reserves make Nigeria the tenth most petroleum-rich nation and by far, the most affluent in Africa. In mid-2001, its crude oil production was averaging around 2,200,000 barrels (350,000 m^{3}) per day. It is expected that the industry will continue to be profitable based on an average benchmark oil price of $85-$90 per barrel.

Nearly all of the country's primary reserves are concentrated in around the delta of the Niger River, but offshore rigs are also prominent in the well-endowed coastal region. Nigeria is one of the few major oil-producing nations still capable of increasing its oil output. Unlike most of the other OPEC countries. The reason for Nigeria's relative unproductivity is primarily OPEC's regulations on production, to regulate prices at the international market. More recently, production has been disrupted intermittently by the protests of the Niger Delta's inhabitants, who feel they are being exploited.

Nigeria has a total of 159 oil fields and 1481 wells in operation according to the Department of Petroleum Resources. The most productive region of the nation is the coastal Niger Delta Basin in the Niger Delta or "South-south" region, which encompasses 78 of the 159 oil fields. Most of Nigeria's oil fields are small and scattered, and in 1990, these small unproductive fields accounted for 62.1% of all Nigerian production. This contrasts with the sixteen largest fields, which produced 37.9% of Nigeria's petroleum at that time.

As a result of the numerous small fields, an extensive and well-developed pipeline network has been engineered to transport the crude oil. Also because of the lack of highly productive fields, money from the jointly operated (with the federal government) companies is constantly directed towards petroleum exploration and production.

Nigeria's petroleum is classified mostly as "light" and "sweet", as the oil is largely free of sulfur. Nigeria is the largest producer of sweet oil in OPEC. This sweet oil is similar in composition to the petroleum extracted from the North Sea. This crude oil is known as "Bonny light". Names of other Nigerian crudes, all of which are named according to export terminal, are Qua Ibo, Escravos blend, Brass River, Forcados, and Pennington Anfan.

In 2010, Nigeria provided about 10% of the United States' oil imports and ranked as the fifth-largest source for oil imports in the U.S. However, Nigeria ceased exports to the U.S. in July 2014 due to increasing competition from U.S. domestic oil production, itself the result of the massive growth of the oil shale industry. India is the largest consumer of Nigerian oil as of 2021.

There are six petroleum export terminals in the country. Shell owns two, while Mobil, Chevron, Texaco, and Agip which is currently operated by Oando after being sold by the former own one each. Shell also owns the Forcados Terminal, which is capable of storing 13 million barrels (2,100,000 m^{3}) of crude oil in conjunction with the nearby Bonny Terminal. Mobil operates primarily out of the Qua Iboe Terminal in Akwa Ibom State, while Chevron owns the Escravos Terminal located in Delta State and has a storage capacity of 3.6 million barrels (570,000 m^{3}). Agip operates the Brass Terminal in Brass, a town 113 kilometres (70 miles) southwest of Port Harcourt and has a storage capacity of 3,558,000 barrels (565,700 m^{3}). Texaco operates the Pennington Terminal.

=== Offshore ===
As of 2005, oil companies in Africa investigated offshore production as an alternative area of production. Deepwater production mainly involved underwater drilling that exists 400 metres (1,300 ft) or more below the surface of the water to expand the possible sources for finding new oil reserves. As of 2005, 50% more oil could be extracted through deep water drilling, than before. In 2003, the amount of oil extracted from Nigeria was expected to expand from 15,000 barrels per day (2,400 m^{3}/d) to 1.27 million barrels per day (202,000 m^{3}/d) in 2010.

Deepwater oil production is less vulnerable to disturbance by local militant attacks and seizures, due to civil conflicts, and sabotage. These advancements offer more resources and alternatives to extract the oil from the Niger Delta, with less exposure to conflict versus the operations on land. As of 2014, an open-air market for illegal crude oil operates off the Niger Delta, called the Togo Triangle.

As of 2021, Angola and Nigeria were the largest oil producers in Africa. In Nigeria, the deepwater sector still has a large avenue to expand and develop. The Agbami oilfields hit full production in 2005, at 250,000 barrels (40,000 m^{3}) a day. Operated by Chevron's Star Deep and a company called Famfa, Agbami is only one offshore concession; there are others named Akpo, Bonga and Erha.

=== Natural gas ===
Natural gas reserves are well over 5,300 km^{3} (187×10^{12} cu ft). The gas reserves are three times as substantial as the crude oil reserves. Much of Nigeria's natural gas is flared off. The biggest natural gas initiative is the Nigerian Liquified Natural Gas Company, which is operated jointly by several companies and the states. It began exploration and production in 1999. In 2008, the government prepared a Gas Master Plan that was intended to promote natural gas production and encourage the supply of natural gas to domestic power stations so as to help alleviate the country's electricity shortages. An export pipeline, the West African Gas Pipeline (WAGP), has encountered numerous setbacks. The pipeline allows for transportation of natural gas to Benin, Ghana, and Togo. There are plans for an African Atlantic Gas Pipeline to extend the WAGP to Morocco and for a Trans-Saharan Gas Pipeline to Algeria.

=== Downstream ===
A decade from 1979 to 1989, motor spirit consumption in Nigeria increased from 2.3 million metric tons (MMT) to 4.4 MMT, an average annual increase of 7.5%. In 1989, motor spirit consumption grew by 12.8%. Nigeria's total petroleum refining capacity currently is 450,000 barrels (72,000 m^{3}) per day, however, only 240,000 barrels (38,000 m^{3}) per day was allotted during the 1990s. Subsequently, crude oil production for refineries was reduced further to as little as 75,000 barrels (11,900 m^{3}) per day, during the regime of Sanni Abacha. There are four major oil refineries: the Warri Refining and Petrochemicals Company plant, which can process 125,000 barrels (19,900 m^{3}) of crude per day, the New Port Harcourt Refinery, which can produce 150,000 barrels (24,000 m^{3}) per day (there is also an 'Old' Port Harcourt Refinery with negligible production), as well as the now defunct Kaduna Refinery. The Port Harcourt and Warri Refineries both operate at only 30% capacity. The Dangote Refinery, expected to open during the fourth quarter of 2022 will have a daily refining capacity of 650,000 barrels (103,000 m^{3}), increasing Nigeria's refining capacity to over 1,000,000 barrels (160,000 m^{3}) per day.

== History and politics ==
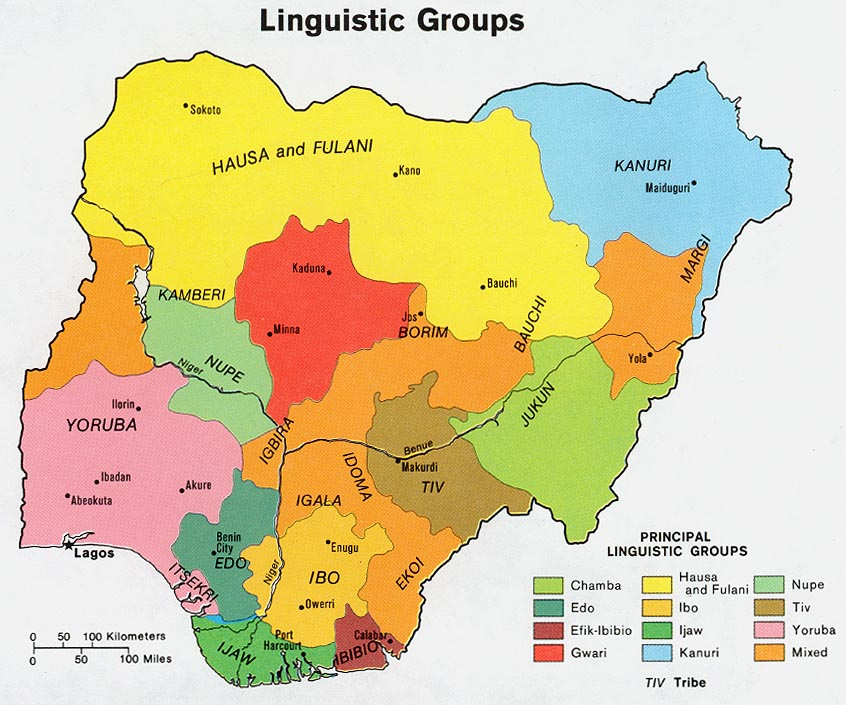
An Ethno-linguistic map of Nigeria

Prior to its official amalgamation into the Colony and Protectorate of Nigeria by the military forces of the British Empire in 1914, the territory of Nigeria was a loose collection of autonomous states, villages, and ethnic communities. Many of these established themselves as pillars of art, trade, and politics in West Africa as late as the 19th century; four of these cultural entities, the Hausa-Fulani, the Igbo (sometimes spelled Ibo), the Yoruba and the Efik grew extremely prominent in the region before the arrival of foreigners, dictated British colonial policies, and dominate national politics in Nigeria to this day.

The modern Hausa and Fulani societies in northern Nigeria are the cultural successors of the Sokoto Caliphate, a theocratic state founded by Muslim reformer empire-maker Uthman dan Fodio in 1817. Geographically isolated in the north, the Caliphate was governed by Islamic laws as prescribed by dan Fodio's Kitab al-Farq and maintained greater links commercially and culturally to North Africa and the Arab states than to West Africa and the Atlantic.

By contrast, the Yoruba, the Igbo and the Efik in the south had regularly experienced contact with Europeans since at least the 16th century. A minority of southerners converted to Christianity even prior to the establishment of permanent British control, but the majority followed traditional indigenous religions, worshipping myriad deities with vast domains spanning both cosmic and terrestrial spheres.

Coastal Nigerians established thriving trade both regionally and abroad, fashioning the coast into a hub for products like palm oil, a good sought after by rapidly industrialising Europe, while also serving as key source for the slave trade prior to its international banning (the region came to be known as the Slave Coast as a result).

The Niger Delta region, which is roughly synonymous with the Niger Delta province in location and the contemporary heart of the petroleum industry, is and was a zone of dense cultural diversity and is currently inhabited by roughly forty ethnic groups speaking an estimated 250 dialects. Some of the more relevant ethnic groups in the western part of the Niger Delta region include the Ijaw, Itsekiri, and Ogoni. The Ijaw (sometimes spelled Ijo), the fourth most populous tribe in Nigeria and by far the largest in the Delta region, lived during late medieval times in small fishing villages within the inlets of the delta; however by the 16th century, as the slave trade grew in importance, Ijaw port cities like Bonny and Brass developed into major trading states which served as major exporters of fish and other goods regionally. Other states such as those of Itsekiri domain of Warri sprang up at this time as well.

The eastern Niger Delta region has the Efik people (Annang / Efik / Ibibio who are all related with a common language and ancestors who were all referred to as Efik or Calabar people in early Nigerian history). Their capital city of Calabar, located at the coastal southeast of Nigeria (eastern Niger Delta) served as the major trading and shipping center during the pre-colonial and colonial period. Calabar also served as the first capital of Nigeria and the point of entry of Western religion and Western education into southeastern Nigeria. The combined population of the Ibibio, Annang, and Efik people is the fourth largest language group in Nigeria.

=== Colonial legacy (1800s–1960s) ===
Even before the combination of British control over all of present-day Nigeria's borders in 1914 from the protectorates of Southern and Northern Nigeria, British forces had begun imposing drastic political and economic policies on the Nigerian people which would lead to important consequences in the future. Originally this was done primarily through the government-owned Royal Niger Company. The company was crucial in securing most of Nigeria's major ports and monopolised coastal trade; this resulted in the severing of the ties which had linked the area to the flourishing West African regional trade network, in favour of the exportation of cheap natural resources and cash crops to industrialising nations. Most of the population eventually abandoned food production for such market-dependent crops (peanuts and cotton in the north, palm oil in the east, and cocoa in the west). From the beginning, divide and rule tactics were employed by both traders and administrators, highlighting ethno-religious differences and playing groups against one another. After 1914, the north was permitted a system of indirect rule under authoritarian leaders, while in the south the British exercised control directly.

Interest in Nigerian oil originated in 1914 with an ordinance making any oil and mineral under Nigerian soil legal property of the Crown. By 1938 the colonial government had granted the state-sponsored company, Shell (then known as Shell D'Arcy) a monopoly over the exploration of all minerals and petroleum throughout the entire colony. Commercially viable oil was discovered by Shell in 1956 roughly 90 kilometres (56 mi) west of the soon-to-be oil capital of Port Harcourt at Oloibiri, now in Bayelsa State; initially a 50–50 profit sharing system was implemented between the company and the government. Until the late 1950s concessions on production and exploration continued to be the exclusive domain of the company, then known as Shell-BP. However, other firms became interested and by the early 1960s Mobil, Texaco, and Gulf had purchased concessions.

In October 1960, Nigeria gained full independence from Britain with the British monarch continuing to preside as Head of State, but the country quickly altered its relationship with its former colonizers by declaring Nigeria a republic of three federated states (the Eastern, Western and Northern Regions). But the flaring of ethnic tensions assured that this new republic would be short-lived, as on 15 January 1966, a small group of army officers consisting mostly of southeastern Igbos, staged a successful coup d'état against the civilian government. The federal military government which assumed power under General Aguiyi-Ironsi was unable to quiet ethnic tensions or produce a constitution acceptable to all sections of the country. In fact, its efforts to abolish the federal structure exacerbated the growing unrest and led to another coup, led by largely northern officers in July of the same year. This second coup established the regime of Major General Yakubu Gowon. Subsequently, the massacre of thousands of Igbo in the north prompted hundreds of thousands to return to the southeast, where increasingly strong Igbo secessionist sentiment emerged under the leadership of the Igbo military governor Lieutenant Colonel Chukwuemeka Odumegwu Ojukwu.

With tensions stoked between the Eastern region and Gowon's federal government, on 4–5 January 1967, in compliance with Ojukwu's desire to meet for talks only on neutral soil, a summit attended by Gowon, Ojukwu and other members of the Supreme Military Council was held at Aburi in Ghana, the stated purpose of which was to resolve all outstanding conflicts and establish Nigeria as a confederation of regions. The outcome of this summit was the Aburi Accord, the differing interpretations of which would soon cause Ojukwu to declare Biafran independence and plunge Nigeria into civil war.

=== Implications and causes of civil war (1966–1970) ===
Map showing the location of the secessionist Republic of Biafra within Nigeria

Igbo withdrawal arose in part from the pogroms in the North that were aimed at Eastern people, most specifically, the Igbo. However, since the southeast encompassed most of the petroleum-rich Niger Delta, the prospect emerged of the Eastern Region gaining self-sufficiency and increasing prosperity. The exclusion of easterners from power caused many in the east to fear that oil revenues would be used to benefit areas in the north and west rather than their own. The desire to accrue profits from oil revenues combined with ethnic tensions acted as a catalyst for the Igbo-spearheaded secession.

Additionally, despite his denials in later years, it appears that Ojukwu's insistence on secession at the time was heavily influenced by his knowledge of the extent of the area's oil reserves. Recent evidence has suggested a tax battle waged by American oil companies contributed to the regional and ethnic tensions that would lead to the outbreak of war. It was also during this period that, again thanks to the Americans, the opacity and concomitant corruption of Nigerian oil began to crystallise. However, evidence from leaked US State Department documents have proven that Britain, through Shell-Mex & BP, still held the most influence over the Nigerian oil industry at the time the war broke out. The United States declared neutrality, with US Secretary of State Dean Rusk stating that "America is not in a position to take action as Nigeria is an area under British influence".

On top of scores of deaths, the war had a largely negative impact on the oil industry. Strife caused production of crude to drop significantly, particularly in Biafra. Total crude output decreased from 420,000 barrels per day (67,000 cubic metres per day) in 1966 at the start of the war, to only 140,000 barrels per day (22,000 cubic metres per day) in 1968. Shell alone saw a drop from 367,000 barrels per day (58,300 cubic metres per day) in 1966, to 43,000 (6,800) in 1968. And in addition to concerns about production, oil companies began experiencing uncertainty as to the future of their investments depending on who prevailed in the war. This led to relations between oil companies and the federal government becoming strained, with the government at one point accusing the oil company Safrap (now TotalFinaElf, but Elf until 1974) of favouring Biafra and enlisting the aid of France for the Biafran cause. Shell, the other major holder of concessions in the southeast, was concerned but placated and limited politically by Britain's staunch support of the Nigerian government in the war effort.

Despite oil's prominent role in national affairs, up to this time, the Nigerian federal government had only limited involvement in the oil industry, and the government confined its financial involvement in the oil industry to taxes and royalties on the oil companies. The companies were subsequently able to set their own price on the petroleum they extracted, and dominated petroleum to such a point that laws governing the oil sector were having a negative effect on Nigerian interests. However, even during the conflict with Biafra would force changes to the relationship between federal government and the petroleum industry. Gowon's military government instituted the 1969 Petroleum Decree which dismantled the existing revenue allocation system that had divided revenue from oil taxes equally between federal and state government, instead favouring an allocation formula in which the federal government controlled the dispensation of revenues to the states.

After the loss of over 2,000,000 lives, the war concluded in 1970 and resulted in a victory for the Nigerian state, as the withdrawing regions were subsequently brought back into the Nigerian fold.

=== Industry Nationalisation (1970–1979) ===
In May 1971 the Nigerian federal government, then under the control of General Yakubu Gowon, nationalised the oil industry by creating the Nigerian National Oil Corporation via a decree. Following the war with Biafra, the government felt it necessary to secure and gain more control over the oil industry. Nationalization of the oil sector was also precipitated by Nigeria's desire to join OPEC, which was encouraging member states to acquire 51% stakes and become increasingly involved in the oil sector. Although the Nigerian government had maintained involvement in the industry prior to 1971, this was accomplished mainly through business deals on concessions of the foreign firms in operation. The creation of the NNOC made government participation in the industry legally binding. The federal government would continue to consolidate its oil involvement throughout the next several decades.

However, it was during the years of Gowon and his successors Murtala Mohammed and Olusegun Obasanjo known officially as the Heads of the Federal Military Government of Nigeria, who ruled amidst the oil boom of the 1970s that the political economy of petroleum in Nigeria truly became characterised by endemic patronage and corruption by the political elites, which plagues the nation to this day. At both state and federal government levels, power and therefore wealth has typically been monopolised by select lobby groups who maintain a strong tendency to 'look after their own' by financially rewarding their political supporters. At the state or community level this means that interest groups in power will reward and protect their own; this is typically based on ethnic/tribal or religious affiliation of the interest group. The heavy patronage based on tribal affiliation has fueled ethnic unrest and violence throughout Nigeria, but particularly in the Niger Delta states, where the stakes for control of the immense oil resources are very high. At the federal level, political elites have utilised patronage to consolidate power for the ruling government, not only by rewarding their political friends in the federal government, but also by paying off major interest groups at the state or tribal level in order to elicit their cooperation. Inevitably these financial favours are distributed unequally and inefficiently, resulting in concentration of wealth and power in the hands of a small minority. Nigeria is ranked by the Corruption Perceptions Index 136st out of 180 countries total (for comparison, this is the same as Russia).

Following the NNOC's genesis, the Nigerian government continued to garner control over oil revenues. In 1972 it declared that all property not currently owned by a foreign entity was legally the property of the government, which gained jurisdiction over the sale and allocation of concessions to foreign investors. The military regime oversaw the implementation of a number of other important milestones related to oil:

1974: Participation in oil industry by government increases to 55%.

1975: Decree 6 increases federal government share in oil sector to 80%, with only 20% going to the states.

1976: First exploration and development venture by NNOC undertaken and drills to uncover commercial quantities of petroleum offshore.

1978: Perhaps most importantly, the federal government created the Land Use Act which vested control over state lands in military governors appointed by the federal military regime, and eventually led to Section 40(3) of the 1979 constitution which declared all minerals, oil, natural gas, and natural resources found within the bounds of Nigeria to be legal property of the Nigerian federal government.

1979: In an effort to establish further control over the industry, the government merges and restructures the NNOC and the Ministry of Petroleum to form the Nigerian National Petroleum Corporation, an entity which would exert more power over the allocation and sale of concessions than the NNOC. By 1979, the NNPC had also gained 60% participation in the oil industry.

=== Attempted democracy and debt (1979–1983) ===
Despite the vast revenues accrued by Gowon and his heirs, the junta succumbed to the demands of the civilian population, and in 1979 military head of state Olusegun Obasanjo handed over power to elected National Party of Nigeria (NPN) candidate Shehu Shagari. This event coincided with the declaration of Nigeria's Second Republic. At this juncture, the oil producing states of the Niger Delta were accounting for 82% of all federal government revenue but the population of these areas received very little compensation and demands for adequate reimbursement for the black gold extracted from their land could be heard at this time. Overall, petroleum accounted for 96% of all government external revenue but a mere 27% of the nation's GDP. However, the advent of democracy did not improve the situation.

A 1982 Revenue Act implemented by the Shagari government would eventually be modified by yet another military regime in 1984 via Decree 36 which reduced the government share of oil revenue from 80% to 55%. States got 32.5% and 10% went to local governments. The remaining 1.5% was earmarked as a special fund to new develop oil-producing areas, but during the Shagari regime the corruption in Nigerian governance reached its zenith and capital flight out of Nigeria peaked, while people in the oil-producing areas continued to receive little or none of the oil profits. Additionally, 1980 saw oil-generated revenues attain an all-time high of US$24.9 billion but Nigeria still managed an international debt of $9 billion.

Shagari's NPN government was viewed by the majority of Nigerians as incorrigibly corrupt by the time the national elections of 1983 came about. Shagari and his subordinates steadily transformed Nigeria into a police state where Nigerian military and police forces were permitted to utilise force quite liberally in order to control the civilian population. Such repressive measures were employed to ensure victory in the forthcoming elections, and this outcome was achieved largely through the bankrupting of the federal government's treasury.

Another disturbing trend had also been gaining steam in Nigeria since the early 1970s: a steep drop in agricultural production correlating roughly with the rise in federal revenues from petroleum extraction. Whereas previously Nigeria had been the world's lead exporter of cocoa, production of this cash crop dropped by 43%, while productivity in other important income generators like rubber (29%), groundnuts (64%), and cotton (65%) plummeted as well between 1972 and 1983. The decline in agricultural production was not limited to cash crops amid the oil boom, and national output of staple foodstuffs also fell. This situation contrasts to Nigeria in 1960 just after independence, when despite British underdevelopment, the nation was more or less self-sufficient in terms of food supply, while crops made up 97% of all revenue from exports. The drop in production was so substantial that by the early 1980s the NPN government was forced to implement a now notorious import license scheme which essentially involved Nigeria, for the first time in its history, importing basic food items. However, as Nigerian activist and Nobel Laureate Wole Soyinka asserts, "the import license scam that was used by the party as a reward and enticement for party loyalists and would-be supporters cost the nation billions of dollars...while food production in the country virtually ceased".

=== Return to military rule and electoral annulment (1983–1993) ===
For these reasons, seizure of power by General Muhammadu Buhari a short time after the NPN government was fraudulently re-elected was initially perceived as a positive development by civilians. Buhari charged out of the gate in December 1983, declaring himself Head of the Supreme Military Council of Nigeria, he condemned the civilian government's blatant corruption and instituted programs supposedly designed to eliminate the disease of corruption. However, these measures were largely transparent and the looting of federal coffers by Nigeria's rulers continued largely unabated, "as Shagari's officers – both within party and government – left the country, came in and out as they pleased, while Buhari's tribunal sentence opposition figures to spells of between a hundred and three hundred years in prison for every dubious kind of crime". The Buhari government neglected to punish even Shagari himself, a consistent trend in Nigerian's long line of dictatorial rulers, who almost universally been spared any kind of justice.

In 1985, another general, this time General Ibrahim Babangida, stole power and again alleged that his predecessors were corrupt violators of human rights and promised to rectify the situation, committing to a return to democracy by 1990. Nigeria had been saddled with a crushingly large international debt at this point. This was because, despite over 101 billion US dollars having been generated by the oil industry between 1958 and 1983, nearly all of these funds had been siphoned into the private bank accounts and the state sponsored pet projects maintained by the succession of Nigerian governmental elites.

Immediately prior to Babangida's rise to power, which is viewed by some as having been orchestrated by international oil and banking interests, the International Monetary Fund was exerting increasingly acute pressure on the Nigerian government to repay its massive debts, of which 44% of all federal revenue was already servicing. Therefore, it was unsurprising when Babangida implemented the IMF's Structural Adjustment Program in October 1986 in order to facilitate debt repayment. The SAP was extremely controversial while it was in effect between 1986 and 1988. While it did permit Nigerian exports to become more competitive internationally and spurred a degree of economic growth, the SAP also incurred a dramatic drop in real wages for the majority of Nigerians. This, combined with major cuts to important public services, incited public unrest so extreme that Babangida's Armed Forces Ruling Council was obliged to partially reverse the SAP initiatives and return to inflationary economic policies. Babangida's rule also oversaw the annihilation of the Nigerian economic middle class, and Nigeria's entry to the Organisation of the Islamic Conference, despite Muslims accounting for less than 50% of the Nigerian populace.

The 1980s military juntas conducted several attempted re-organisations of the NNPC to increase its efficiency. However, according to most sources by the early 1990s the NNPC was characterised by chronic inefficiency and waste. Red tape and poor organisation are standard, with the NNPC being divided into several sub-entities, each fulfilling a particular function. This is despite the NNPC's growing participation in the industry, including development and exploration of numerous off-shore wells. As a result, the functionality of the industry is dependent on foreign corporations, not the NNPC.

The sudden jump in oil prices caused by the First Gulf War in 1990 and 1991, as most researchers confirm, was at best squandered. The Babangida junta has been widely accused of "mismanaging" the oil windfall from the Gulf War price jump, which accounted for about $12.5 billion in revenues. Another alleges that the federal government siphoned off about $12.2 billion between 1988 and 1994 into private accounts or expenditures, "clandestinely undertaken while the country was openly reeling with a crushing external debt".

Under these circumstances, Babangida eventually allowed for nationwide elections on 12 June 1993. These elections were declared universally free and fair (at least in comparison to past elections) by all major international election monitors, and the eventual winner of the presidential race was the Chief M.K.O. Abiola [of the newly formed SDP]. However, the military regime cynically pronounced the election, in which fourteen million Nigerians participated, to be null and void due to "electoral irregularities". The Nigerian people took to the streets in large numbers to protest the election's annulment. As civil unrest continued, Babangida was forced to cede power to the caretaker government of Ernest Shonekan.

=== Environment of crisis (1993–present) ===
Shonekan's interim government would be short-lived, as on 17 November 1993, Babangida's former Chief of Army Staff and Minister of Defence Sani Abacha overthrew the caretaker regime and installed himself as Head of State. Popular opposition to the junta was widespread and public demonstrations were taking place on a regular basis. Immediately upon taking power, Abacha commenced the brutal repression of these subversive elements which would make his tenure notorious on a global basis.

Throughout the early 1990s such popular unrest grew steadily, particularly in the Niger Delta region, where various ethnic groups began demanding compensation for years of ecological damage as well as control over their land's oil resources. This unrest manifested itself at the outset as peaceful activist organisations that united their members on the basis of ethnicity.

One of the most prominent of these organisations to emerge in the region was the Movement for the Survival of the Ogoni People (MOSOP). The group declared that the Ogoni people, a small minority in Rivers State of Nigeria, were slowly being annihilated as the arable terrain of their homeland (known as Ogoni land) was degraded by pollution from oil production by Chevron and primarily Shell.

Conflict in the Niger Delta arose in the early 1990s due to tensions between the foreign oil corporations, the Nigerian federal government, and a number of the Niger Delta's ethnic groups who felt they were being exploited, particularly minority groups like the Ogoni as well as the Ijaw in the late 1990s. Ethnic and political unrest has continued throughout the 1990s and persists as of 2006 despite the conversion to a more democratic, civilian federal system under the Obasanjo government in 1999; democracy has to some degree fan the flames as politicians seeking office may now employ militia groups to coerce voters and generally disrupt the election process. Competition for oil wealth has fueled violence between innumerable ethnic groups, causing the militarisation of nearly the entire region by ethnic militia groups as well as Nigerian military and police forces (notably the Nigerian Mobile Police). Victims of crimes are fearful of seeking justice for crimes committed against them because of growing "impunity from prosecution for individuals responsible for serious human rights abuses, [which] has created a devastating cycle of increasing conflict and violence". The regional and ethnic conflicts are so numerous that fully detailing each is impossible and impractical.

On 30 January 2013, a Dutch court ruled that Shell can be held accountable for the pollution in the Niger Delta.

== Operating agreements ==
As of 1999, details and nature of the relationship between the government and the operating companies were governed by three types of agreements, joint ventures, production sharing contracts and service contracts.

=== Joint-venture companies ===
Shell Plc. (British)
Shell Petroleum Development Company of Nigeria Limited (SPDC), usually known simply as Shell Nigeria: A joint venture operated by Shell accounts for 50% of Nigerian's total oil production (899,000 barrels (142,900 m^{3}) per day in 1997) from more than eighty oil fields. The joint venture is composed of NNPC (55%), Shell (30%), TotalFinaElf (10%) and Agip (5%) and operates largely onshore on dry land or in the mangrove swamp in the Niger Delta. "The company has more than 100 producing oil fields, and a network of more than 6,000 kilometres of pipelines, flowing through 87 flowstations. SPDC operates 2 coastal oil export terminals". The Shell joint venture produces about 50% of Nigeria's total crude. Shell Nigeria owns concessions on four companies, they are: Shell Petroleum Development Company (SPDC), Shell Nigeria Exploration and Production Company (SNEPCO), Shell Nigeria Gas (SNG), Shell Nigeria Oil Products (SNOP), as well as holding a major stake in Nigeria Liquified Natural Gas (NLNG). Shell formerly operated alongside BP as Shell-BP, but BP has since sold all of its Nigerian concessions. Most of Shell's operations in Nigeria are conducted through the Shell Petroleum Development Company (SPDC).

Chevron (American)
Chevron Nigeria Limited (CNL): A joint venture between NNPC (60%) and Chevron (40%) has in the past been the second largest producer (approximately 400,000 barrels per day (64,000 cubic metres per day)), with fields located in the Warri region west of the Niger river and offshore in shallow water. It is reported to aim to increase production to 600,000 barrels per day (95,000 cubic metres per day).

ExxonMobil (American)
Mobil Producing Nigeria Unlimited (MPNU): A joint venture between the NNPC (60%) and ExxonMobil (40%) operates in shallow water off Akwa Ibom state in the southeastern delta and averaged production of 632,000 barrels per day (100,500 cubic metres per day) in 1997, making it the second largest producer, as against 543,000 barrels per day (86,300 cubic metres per day) in 1996. Mobil also held a 50% interest in a Production Sharing Contract for a deep water block further offshore and was reported to plan to increase output to 900,000 barrels per day (140,000 cubic metres per day) by 2000. Oil industry sources indicated that Mobil was likely to overtake Shell as the largest producer in Nigeria within the next five years, if current trends continue, mainly due to its offshore base allowing it refuge from the strife Shell has experienced onshore. It has been headquartered in Eket and operating in Nigeria under the subsidiary of Mobil Producing Nigeria (MPN).

Agip (Italian)
Nigerian Agip Oil Company Limited (NAOC): A joint venture operated by Agip and owned by the NNPC (60%), Agip (20%) and ConocoPhillips (20%) produced 150,000 barrels per day (24,000 cubic metres per day) mostly from small onshore fields.

Total (French)
Total Petroleum Nigeria Limited (TPNL): A joint venture between NNPC (60%) and Elf (now Total) produced approximately 125,000 barrels per day (19,900 cubic metres per day) during 1997, both on and offshore. Elf and Mobil are in dispute over operational control of an offshore field with a production capacity of 90,000 barrels per day (14,000 cubic metres per day).

Texaco (now merged with Chevron)
NNPC Texaco-Chevron Joint Venture (formerly Texaco Overseas Petroleum Company of Nigeria Unlimited): A joint venture operated by Texaco and owned by NNPC (60%), Texaco (20%) and Chevron (20%) produced about 60,000 barrels per day (9,500 cubic metres per day) from five offshore fields in 1999.

=== Independent and indigenous oil and gas companies ===
- Addax Petroleum Nigeria Limited
- Aiteo Group
- AMNI International Petroleum Development Company Ltd.
- Consolidated Oil Limited.
- Dubri Oil Company Ltd.
- Emerald Energy Resources Ltd
- Lekoil Nigeria Ltd.
- Yinka Folawiyo Petroleum Company Ltd.

=== Situation, 2019 ===
As of 2007, Nigeria's oil revenue totaled $340 billion in exports since the 1970s and it was the fifth largest producer. Nigeria imports most of its motor spirit, though it is a major oil exporter, and when fuel subsidies were lifted in January 2012, fuel increased from roughly $1.70 per gallon to $3.50. As of 2019, Nigeria produced a form of oil ideal for the United States, had huge reserves, and increased its production to 2.8 million barrels (450,000 m^{3}) of oil a day. At the same time this has been described as a resource curse hurting Nigeria and disadvantaging her people.

Situation, 2024

Nigeria's crude oil production decreased to 1.25 million barrels per day in May 2024, down from 1.28 million barrels per day in April 2024. This represents a decline of 30,000 barrels per day and is the second-lowest production level in 2024. Despite this, Nigeria remains the largest crude oil producer in Africa. The country has struggled to meet its OPEC production quota and 2024 budget benchmark, which could impact revenue. However, crude oil prices have increased, offering some consolation. The decline in production may also lead to a reduction in Nigeria's OPEC quota.

The country's gas exports decreased by 25% to a three-year low, similar to the decline in crude oil exports. Low production and the exit of multinationals are the main causes. Experts attributed this to poor infrastructure, vandalism, and insecurity. To improve the situation, they recommend investing in infrastructure, enhancing security, and promoting gas-based industries. Despite the decline in exports, domestic gas sales have increased. The government's renewed interest in gas development and investments in upstream gas projects are expected to improve the outlook for Nigeria's gas production.

=== Oil theft ===
In July 2013, a report analysing the effect of oil theft in Nigeria revealed that Nigeria lost $10.9 billion in potential oil revenues between 2009 and 2011. In 2022, the country's oil industry's regulator mentioned that oil theft accounted for 108,000 barrels a day, which is about 7% of total oil production. Watchdogs reckoned that 5% to 20% of oil in Nigeria is reportedly stolen. The Trans-Niger pipeline suffered so much theft that its oil flow was forced to be halted. The head of the NNPC, Mele Kyari claimed that oil companies have cut production worth 700,000 barrels per day to avoid oil theft.

In February 2024, personnel of "Operation Delta Sanity" (a special operation force of the Nigerian Navy) claimed to have recovered a total of 8,764,080 litres of stolen crude oil and other products worth ₦7.4bn in operations conducted between February 19 and 28, 2024.

=== Process and Industrial Developments dispute ===
Process and Industrial Developments Ltd (P&ID) entered into a 20-year contract with the Nigerian government for natural gas supply and processing. Nigeria provided the gas, which PI&D refined so that it could be used to power the Nigerian electrical grid. PI&D could keep valuable byproducts for its own use. In 2012, PI&D demanded arbitration in London, alleging that Nigeria had not supplied the agreed quantity of gas or to construct the infrastructure it had agreed to build. The arbitral tribunal awarded damages of more than £4.8 billion. The compensation was valued £8.15 billion with interest when the case was heard in London High Court in December 2022.

== Environmental impact ==
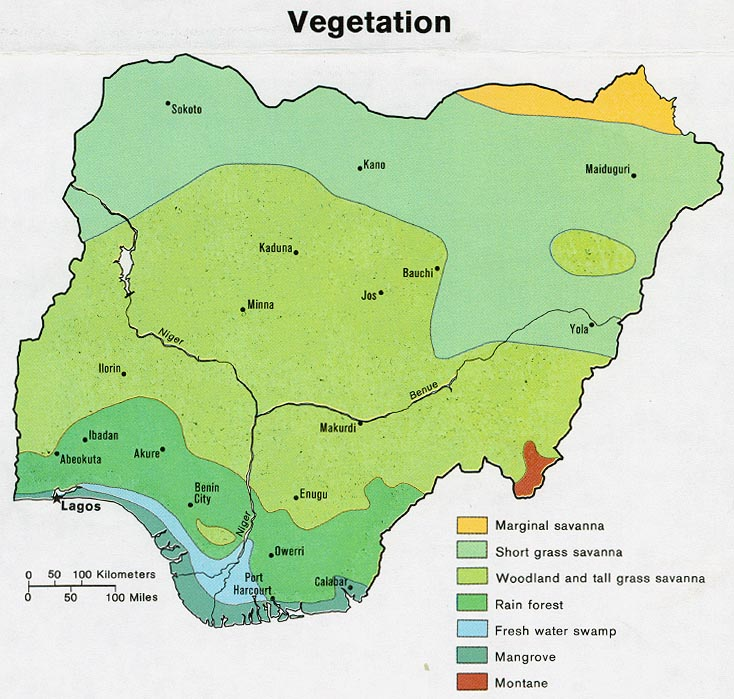
Map of vegetation in Nigeria

The Niger Delta comprises 70,000 square kilometres (27,000 square miles) of wetlands formed primarily by sediment deposition. Home to more than 20 million people and 40 different ethnic groups, this floodplain makes up 7.5% of Nigeria's total land mass. It is the largest wetland and maintains the third-largest drainage area in Africa. The Delta's environment can be broken down into four ecological zones: coastal barrier islands, mangrove swamp forests, freshwater swamps, and lowland rainforests.

This incredibly well-endowed ecosystem, which contains one of the highest concentrations of biodiversity on the planet, in addition to supporting an abundant flora and fauna, arable terrain that can sustain a wide variety of crops, trees, and more species of freshwater fish than any ecosystem in West Africa. The region could experience a loss of 40% of its inhabitable terrain in the next thirty years because of extensive dam construction in the region. The carelessness of the oil industry has also precipitated this situation, which can perhaps be best encapsulated by a report issued by the NNPC in 1983, long before popular unrest surfaced:

We witnessed the slow poisoning of the waters of this country and the destruction of vegetation and agricultural land by oil spills which occur during petroleum operations. But since the inception of the oil industry in Nigeria, more than twenty-five years ago, there has been no concerned and effective effort on the part of the government, let alone the oil operators, to control environmental problems associated with the industry.

=== Oil spills and water contamination ===
Oil spills in Nigeria are a common occurrence; it has been estimated that between 9 and 13 million barrels (1,400,000 and 2,100,000 m^{3}) have been spilled since oil drilling started in 1958. The government estimates that about 7,000 spills occurred between 1970 and 2000. The process of remediating some of the contaminated site was conducted in Kwawa community, Khana Local Government Area of Rivers State, after the United Nations Environment Programme (UNEP) released an environmental assessment of Ogoniland in 2011, a remediation project popularly refer to as OGONI CLEAN-UP.

Oil spill causes include corrosion of pipelines and tankers (accounts for 50% of all spills), sabotage (28%), and oil production operations (21%), with 1% of the spills being accounted for by inadequate or non-functional production equipment. One reason that corrosion accounts for such a high percentage of all spills is that as a result of the small size of the oilfields in the Niger Delta, there is an extensive network of pipelines between the fields. Many facilities and pipelines were constructed to older standards, are poorly maintained and have outlived their estimated life span. Sabotage is performed primarily through what is known as "bunkering", whereby the saboteur taps a pipeline, and in the process of extraction sometimes the pipeline is damaged. Oil extracted in this manner is often sold for cash compensation.

Oil spills have a major impact on the ecosystem. Large tracts of mangrove forests have been destroyed. They are especially susceptible to oil spills because the oil is stored in the soil and re-released annually with each inundation. An estimated 5–10% of Nigerian mangrove ecosystems have been wiped out either by settlement or by oil. Spills also take out crops and aquacultures through contamination of groundwater and soils. Drinking water is frequently contaminated, and a sheen of oil is visible in many localised bodies of water. If the drinking water is contaminated, even if no immediate health effects are apparent, the numerous hydrocarbons and other chemicals present in oil represent a carcinogenic risk. Offshore spills, which are usually much greater in scale, contaminate coastal environments and cause a decline in local fishing production.

Nigerian regulations are weak and rarely enforced allowing oil companies, in essence, to self-regulate.

=== Natural gas flaring ===
Nigeria flares more natural gas associated with oil extraction than any other country, with estimates suggesting that of the 99,000,000 m^{3} (3.5×10^{9} cu ft) of associated gas (AG) produced annually, 71,000,000 m^{3} (2.5×10^{9} cu ft), or about 70%, is wasted via flaring. Statistical data associated with gas flaring is notoriously unreliable, but AG wasted during flaring is estimated to cost Nigeria US$2.5 billion on a yearly basis. Companies operating in Nigeria harvest natural gas for commercial purposes; however, most prefer to extract it from deposits where it is found in isolation as non-associated gas. It is costly to separate commercially viable associated gas from oil, and hence gas is flared to increase crude production.

Gas flaring is discouraged by the international community as it contributes to climate change. In fact, in western Europe 99% of associated gas is used or re-injected into the ground. Gas flaring in Nigeria releases large amounts of methane, which has a very high global warming potential. The methane is accompanied by carbon dioxide, of which Nigeria is estimated to have emitted more than 34.38 million tons in 2002, accounting for about 50% of all industrial emissions in the country and 30% of the total CO_{2} emissions. As flaring in the west has been minimised, in Nigeria it has grown proportionally with oil production. While the international community, the Nigerian government, and the oil corporations seem to agree that gas flaring need to be curtailed, efforts to do so have been slow and largely ineffective.

Gas flares release a variety of potentially poisonous chemicals such as nitrogen dioxides; sulfur dioxide; volatile organic compounds like benzene, toluene, xylene, and hydrogen sulfide; as well as carcinogens like benzapyrene and dioxins. Often gas flares are often close to local communities and lack adequate fencing or protection for villagers who may risk nearing the heat of the flare in order to carry out their daily activities. Flares which are often older and inefficient are rarely relocated away from villages and are known to coat the land and communities in the area with soot and damage adjacent vegetation.

In November 2005, a judgment by "the Federal High Court of Nigeria ordered that gas flaring must stop in a Niger Delta community as it violates guaranteed constitutional rights to life and dignity. In a case brought against the Shell Petroleum Development Company of Nigeria (Shell), Justice C. V. Nwokorie ruled in Benin City that the damaging and wasteful practice of flaring cannot lawfully continue."

== Human rights impact ==
=== Repression of protest and government corruption ===
One of the greatest threats facing the people of the Niger River Delta has actually been their own government. The Nigerian government has total control over property rights, and they have the authority to seize any property for use by the oil companies. A majority of every dollar that comes out of the ground in the delta goes to the State and Federal governments.

According to the World Bank, most of Nigeria's oil wealth gets siphoned off by 1% of the population. Corruption in the government is rampant: since 1960 it is estimated that 300 to 400 billion dollars has been stolen by corrupt government officials. The corruption is found at the highest levels as well. For example, a former inspector general of the national police was accused of stealing 52 million dollars. He was sentenced to six years in prison for a lesser charge.

Nigerians have on many occasions engaged in protests against oil-related corruption and environmental concerns in the past but have been met with harsh suppression by government forces. For example, in February 2005 at a protest at Chevron's Escravos oil terminal, soldiers opened fire on the protestors. One man was killed, and 30 others were injured. The soldiers claimed that the protestors were armed, which the protestors denied. Another, more extreme example happened in 1994. The Nigerian military moved into a region called Ogoniland in force. They razed 30 villages, arrested hundreds of protestors, and killed an estimated 2,000 people.

One of the protestors they arrested was Ken Saro-Wiwa, a Nigerian TV producer, writer and social activist. In 1990 he founded the Movement for the Survival of the Ogoni People (MOSOP). Ken wrote and spoke out about the rampant corruption in the Nigerian government, and he condemned Shell and BP. He was arrested by the Nigerian government and imprisoned for 17 months. Then in a show trial he and eight others were condemned to death. He and the others were hung in 1995 and he was buried in an unmarked common grave.

=== Poverty and chronic underdevelopment ===
Previous pipeline explosions in Nigeria
City	Date	Casualties
Lagos	26 December 2007	at least 40
Lagos	26 December 2006	at least 260
Lagos	12 May 2006	at least 150
Lagos	December 2004	at least 20
Lagos	September 2004	at least 60
Abia	June 2003	at least 105
Warri	July 2000	at least 300
Abia	March 2000	at least 50
Jesse	October 1998	at least 1000

The people of the delta states have been living in extreme poverty even in the face of great material wealth found in the waters by their homes. In 2006, 70% of the people in the Niger River Delta lived on less than US$1 per day according to Amnesty International. For many people, this meant finding work in a labour market which is in many instances hostile to them. Much of the labour in the past has been imported. To a growing degree, the labour force for the oil companies is coming from Nigeria, but discrimination has been rampant, and for the most part, locals are discriminated against.

This leads to a situation where the men in the community have to search for temporary employment. This has two negative effects on the community. First it takes the men out of the community as they go in search of work. The second is the nature of temporary employment sets up unsustainable spending habits, thinking it will be easy to earn more, when in many cases this does not turn out to be the case).

As of 1999, the government officials siphoned off all the money generated from oil sales, so the infrastructure suffered, where most of the villages did not have electricity or even running water. They do not have good access to schools or medical clinics. For many, even clean drinking water is difficult to come by. The deterioration of the infrastructure in the delta states is so severe it is even a problem in the more urban areas. One example of was the airport at Port Harcourt. Part of a fence was not properly maintained and in 2005, an Air France flight hit a herd of cattle on the runway. The airport was closed and had not reopened by 2007. Yet in 2007, indicted corrupt leaders were also cheered by the Niger Delta people.

As of 2011, the leadership of the Niger Delta region appeared responsible for most of the underdevelopment in the region. There has been large-scale of corruption amongst the elected leaders especially governors, and the leaders have helped sponsor the militant groups in kidnapping and robbing innocent people and sabotaging the efforts by the federal government for infrastructural development.
