= Bitumen and oil sands in Nigeria =

Nigeria holds the largest bitumen, oil sands and extra-heavy oil resource reserves in Africa, and one of the largest in the world. Nigerian bitumen, also known as Nigerian oil sands is not exploited to any significant degree, but remains a potential source of future revenue for the country as well as a strategic geological reserve of hydrocarbons. Nigeria is currently estimated to hold between 38 and 42 billion barrel of oil equivalent (BOE) bitumen in place, ranking it between second and sixth place globally. Nigeria's reserves in bitumen are separate from its reserves in conventional oil which is almost equivalent and currently sits at 37 billion barrels.

According to the previous president of the African Development Bank, Dr. Akinwumi Adesina, Nigeria currently holds bitumen reserves worth up to $1.5 trillion. Canada holds the top spot in oil sands and bitumen reserves, while Venezuela holds the top spot in extra-heavy oil reserves globally.

== History ==
By 1900, bitumen had been found in Nigeria, with early evidence of bitumen occurrence being mostly restricted to borehole core samples. The history of Hydrocarbon exploration in Nigeria traces back to 1903, commencing operations as the Nigerian Bitumen Corporation, a German company which conducted explorations along the coast of the country for Bitumen. In 1908, an article written by T. Hugh Boorman referenced the earlier reports about the appearance of petroleum oil with an asphalt base in immense quantities on the West coast of Africa. The corporation tried to extract this bitumen but had serious difficulty with transportation. At the onset of World War I, the firm's operations were stopped.

The most comprehensive bitumen study in Nigeria was that carried out by Geotechnical Investigations of the Ondo State Bituminous Sands from 1974, led by Professor O.S. Adegoke of the Geological Consultancy Unit of the University of Ife now Obafemi Awolowo University.

In July 2025, the Nigerian senate passed a bill for the establishment of the Nigerian Bitumen Development Commission.

== Geography and distribution ==
Bitumen seeping out from fractures on an outcrop at Agbabu, Ondo State

Bitumen in Nigeria is largely concentrated along an east-west oriented band in the southwestern part of the country in an area that has been termed "Nigeria's bitumen belt". This 'band' geographically spans the region between the Dahomey Basin in the west and the western Niger Delta in the east and covers the states of; Lagos, Ogun, Ondo and Edo, in an area of about 120 km by 6 km. Some geologists speculate that the zone extends all the way south and actually joins Nigeria's conventional oil blocks. Ondo state holds the country's largest reserves at around 16 billion barrels.

Natural occurrences have been recorded from boreholes, along river banks, cliff surfaces, road cuts and farmlands, while surface level bitumen seepages has become an ongoing environmental issue of concern affecting some communities of Ondo state such as Ode-Irele, Agbabu and Ludasa.

Within the bitumen belt, the heaviest and most unconventional resources are generally found in the northern areas at surface or near-surface environments, while the lightest and more conventional samples can be found further south in the deep subsurface. Longitudinally, the area stretches from the area around Ijebu Ode in the west, to the area drained by the tributaries of the Siluko river near Ofosu in the east.

=== Geology ===
Zone of natural bitumen seepage in Nigeria

Nigeria's bitumen deposits are Lower Cretaceous oil sands of the Dahomey Basin; a combination of inland, coastal, and offshore basins, separated from the Niger Delta Basin by the Okitipupa Ridge, a subterranean basement high. The deposits contain heavy oils that started out as conventional light oil and later degraded into heavy oils, rather than thermally cracked oils from over-matured source rocks. Sterane data for the Cretaceous oil sands usually show a selective increase in the C_{29} regular steranes relative to C_{27} and C_{28} regular steranes, which is also consistent with biodegradation which occurred at relatively shallow depths.

=== Types, chemical composition and properties ===
There are four distinct types of hydrocarbons in the Nigerian tar sands, namely: rich sands, outcrops, oil shale and deep-seated heavy oil.

The bitumen content of Nigerian oil and tar sands varies based on location. In samples obtained from Ilubirin, bitumen accounted for 8% to 16% by weight. Bituminous content of 13–16% by weight was obtained by other researchers, while a 1985 study showed that oil sands in Nigeria can range between 5% to 20% in bitumen content. The void percentages in bituminous sand from Nigeria range between 24 and 35 wt%.

The recorded clay content of 2–7% is considerably lower than the average for the Athabasca oil sands in Canada (10–25%). The Nigerian tar sands compare closely with the Athabasca sands in general textural parameters, and are thus expected to display an identical response to mining processing, except for the influence of a higher groundwater table and the higher humidity and ambient temperatures obtainable in Nigeria.

== Economic prospects and commercialization ==
As conventional oil stocks/reserves decline and existing fields age in Nigeria and across the world, international companies are increasingly turning their attention towards existing unconventional oils to meet the rising global demand for energy and other petroleum-derived products. However, as these are unconventional oils, the country would require larger investments covering the operating costs, extra processing, and transportation typically associated with bitumen and heavy oil mining in order to tap into the industry. The industry also has a heavier environmental toll than conventional oil drilling.

Engineers and geologists predict that Nigeria would employ the same extraction methods as Canada, as the reserve seams are largely similar in structure. Nigerian oil sands possess a number of advantages for exploration such as comparatively higher bitumen content, lower concentrations of clay and heavy metals, lower gas and water saturation and favourable granulometric qualities, even though the reservoir boundaries have not yet been accurately delineated.

Despite the industry's potential, Nigeria continues to import bitumen for industrial use. In a 2020 report, the Nigerian government was shown to expend more than ₦300 billion Naira (₦988.3 billion in 2026 values) on bitumen imports annually.

== See also ==
- Energy in Nigeria
- Mining industry of Nigeria
- Oil sands
- Economy of Nigeria
- Petroleum industry in Nigeria
