= Benedict Peters =

Nigerian oil billionaire

- Born: Benedict Peters; December 1966 (age 59)
- Education: Geography and Regional Planning, Majoring in Geomorphology
- Alma mater: University of Benin, Benin
- Occupations: Founder and CEO, Aiteo, Bravura Holdings
- Children: 5
- Website: www.peters.ng

Benedict Peters is a pan-African businessman with extensive assets in the oil and gas and mining industries. He is the founder and CEO of Aiteo, Africa's largest indigenous oil producer, and Bravura Holdings, a vertically integrated mining company developing platinum, lithium, steel, copper, and gold assets in countries throughout Africa, including Ghana, Democratic Republic of Congo, Zambia, Nigeria, Zimbabwe, Namibia, Mozambique, Côte d'Ivoire, Sierra Leone, Guinea Bissau, Libya, Tanzania, and South Africa. Peters is a born again Christian and a prominent financier of the gospel of Jesus Christ.

== Early life and development ==
Peters was born in Nigeria to a bank manager and a homemaker.

He graduated with honors from the University of Benin with a bachelor of science degree in geography and regional planning, majoring in geomorphology.

== Career ==
Peters began his career in the oil and gas industry in the early 1990s at Ocean and Oil Services Limited. He moved to MRS Oil and Gas Limited as group executive director, ending as managing director, before leaving to establish Sigmund Communecci in 1999.

In February 2008, Peters rebranded Sigmund Communecci to Aiteo. The company owns one of the largest petroleum tank farms in Nigeria with facilities in excess of more than 250 million liters on over 100,000 square meters of landmass. It also owns and operates the Abonnema Storage Terminal.

In 2014, Aiteo acquired a controlling stake in Oil Mining Lease (OML) 29 and the Nembe Creek Trunk Line (NCTL) in the Eastern Niger Delta from Royal Dutch Shell Plc. According to Wood Mackenzie, OML 29 is a large block located in the southeastern Niger Delta with "11 oil and gas fields." The 983-square-kilometer OML 29, onshore in the Niger Delta, is the site of Nigeria's first-ever commercial discovery — in 1956 at the Oloibiri Oilfield.

Aiteo is also set to build a 100,000-barrel-per-day (bpd) refinery in oil-rich Warri in Delta State.

In November 2023, Aiteo recorded a historic milestone in Nigeria's oil and gas sector when it launched a new grade of crude called Nembe through a joint venture with the Nigerian National Petroleum Corporation (NNPC). The Nembe crude oil grade has a low sulphur content and low carbon footprint due to flare gas elimination, which meets the required specifications of major buyers in Europe. The Nembe crude stream will be managed and marketed by a joint venture between NNPC and Aiteo Eastern E&P Co. Ltd. It is the first such crude marketing project solely run by Nigerian entities.

In December 2023, Aiteo expanded its global energy presence by acquiring a substantial stake in Mozambique's Mazenga gas block, which is the largest onshore gas reserve in Africa. The acquisition, achieved through agreements with Mozambique’s state oil firm Empresa Nacional de Hidrocarbonetos (ENH), grants Aiteo operational control over the block that spans around 23,000 square kilometers and contains 19 trillion cubic feet of gas. Aiteo has already initiated an extensive development program encompassing aeromagnetic and gravitational studies, field surveys, and data reprocessing.

Peters has rapidly diversified Aiteo by founding Aiteo Power, where he serves as chairman. He also leads the Aiteo Consortium and EMA Consortium, which have won separate bids to acquire three power-generating companies.

Peters is also the founder and CEO of Bravura Holdings, a vertically integrated mining company developing gold, copper, lithium, and steel assets in countries throughout the African continent, including Ghana, Democratic Republic of Congo, Zambia, Nigeria, Zimbabwe, Namibia, and South Africa. In 2019, Bravura acquired a 3,000-hectare concession for a platinum mine in Selous, located 80 kilometers south of Harare. The company also owns a sprawling lithium deposit in Kamativi, a small mining town in Zimbabwe, concessions for cobalt mines in the Democratic Republic of Congo, copper mines in Zambia, and gold mines in Ghana, as well as a diversified portfolio of mining assets in Mozambique, Côte d'Ivoire, Sierra Leone, and Guinea Bissau.

In February 2024, the Atlantic Council announced a three-year initiative targeting critical minerals in Africa, in collaboration with Aiteo. The initiative will establish a 12-person task force focused on critical minerals, assembling participants from the United States, Europe, and Africa, including figures from the financial sector, development organizations, and governments. Amid the global pursuit of critical minerals, the task force will convene regularly in Washington, D.C. Their discussions will aim to assess the importance and potential of African minerals within supply chains of the U.S. and EU, devise approaches to improve the involvement of African nations and suppliers, and identify ways to more successfully mobilize the private sector.

== Awards and philanthropy ==
Peters and his wife, Ella, are the founders of the Benedict & Ella Peters Foundation. The non-profit organization is dedicated to fighting the inequalities and hardships of the underprivileged across Africa.

Peters was one of four recipients of the Marquee Award for Global Business Excellence at the Africa-U.S. Leadership Awards Dinner on 5 August 2014 in Washington, D.C. hosted by the African Energy Association, a non-profit energy industry organization.

Leadership, a national newspaper based in Abuja, Nigeria, named Peters "Leadership CEO of the Year 2014" for championing a local content deal that facilitated the engagement of Nigerian-owned companies in managing oil assets in his native country, Nigeria.

On 18 January 2015, Peters was presented the Dr. Martin Luther King, Jr., Legacy Award in the "Economic Empowerment" category at an event held at the Willard Hotel in Washington, D.C.

BusinessDay, a national business and finance newspaper in Nigeria, ranked Peters among the "50 Most Influential Nigerians" in 2017.

In June 2018, The Guardian (Nigeria), a mainstream national newspaper in Nigeria, named Peters "Oil and Gas CEO of the Year.

In 2019, BusinessDay also named Peters "Man of the Year".

In April 2017, Aiteo announced the signing of a five-year partnership agreement with the Nigeria Football Federation, worth an estimated N2.9 billion naira ($3.8 million). In its capacity as the NFF Official Optimum Partner, Aiteo provided financial support that funded the salaries of Super Eagles boss Gernot Rohr and the coaches of all NFF national teams. Peters told the media that "Aiteo is as passionate about leadership as Nigerians are about football. so we are proud to be working together with the NFF and its coaching staff to reach a shared goal of a more prosperous Nigeria."

== Personal life ==
Peters is married and has five children. He is a born again Christian and financier of the gospel of Christ.

He is a longtime supporter of democratic movements in Nigeria and globally. Peters continues to be a major donor to progressive political processes in Africa. This position has put him at odds with opposing political forces internally and externally, and resulted in politically charged investigations into his commercial dealings.

Peters was falsely accused in the Pandora Papers of bribing Nigerian oil official Diezani Alison-Madueke with overseas luxury real estate to secure favors with the Nigerian Ministry of Petroleum Resources. Benedict denied the allegations.

In 2017, the Appeal Court of Nigeria ordered the immediate lift of an interim forfeiture order on Peters' properties in the UK, which had earlier been obtained by Nigeria's Economic and Financial Crimes Commission (EFCC).

The court accused the EFCC of "gross misstatements, concealment and misrepresentation of facts.

In early November 2023, the African Centre for Justice and Human Rights (ACJHR), a pan-African civil society group, lodged a petition with Nigeria's House of Representatives, demanding a comprehensive legislative investigation into the defamation and undermining of Nigerian businessman Benedict Peters.

According to the petition, which was presented on behalf of the civil society organization by Kaduna State Member of the House of Representatives Aliyu Mustapha Abdullahi, British officials and investigative agencies repeatedly "disregarded rulings from Nigerian courts and engaged in actions aimed at undermining court decisions that vindicated Benedict Peters.

Through the petition, the ACJHR seeks to "compel the British government to stop undermining Nigeria's judicial sovereignty and the judgments rendered by competent Nigerian courts."

The House of Representatives adopted the petition and is expected to launch an inquiry in mid-November.
