= Kpopie =

Town in Nigeria

Kpopie is one of the towns in Gokana Local Government Area of Rivers State, Nigeria. The town is bordered by Bonny on the east and Bodo on the west in Gokana Local Government Area of the state.

Recently the governor of Rivers State, Nyesom Wike flagged off the construction of the Kpopie-Bodo road which will help to relieve the people of the town who have complained of poor road networks.
