= Bodo River, Gokana =

River in Bodo-city, Rivers State, Nigeria

Bodo River is located in Bodo-city, Gokana Local Government Area, Rivers State, Nigeria.

Bodo River is one of the rivers in Gokana Kingdom. It has been a means of survival for the people of Gokana Kingdom. Men and women go fishing in Bodo River as a means of survival.

The Bodo-Bonny Road contract being carried out by Julius Berger company has been constructed on the Bodo River. In 2008 and 2009, two incidents of massive oil spills from the trans Niger pipeline devastated the Bodo River and coastline, destroying every living thing in the river, opportunities, made fishing impossible, and ruined income that could have come from other aquatic resources. the water still remains dark and slippery, the mangroves covered with black mud and the creeks, which are now a mixture of crude and water, have now become the only source of seafood classified as dangerous to health.

== Pollution ==
Report has it that in 2008 and 2009, two incidents of massive oil spills from the Trans-Niger pipeline devastated the Bodo coastline destroying every living thing in the river were recorded. Bodo river major pollutant is oil spillage which have occurred severally.

According to report, In 2008 and 2009, two cased of massive oil slicks from the Trans-Niger pipeline crushed the Bodo River killing each living thing in the waterway. While the local area was managing the spill, one more from the Trans-Niger pipeline at Koloma-Zommadom street shook the local area.

Bodo and other communities mangroves and farmlands were vigorously polluted with raw petroleum spill, which annihilated its environs, making it difficult to fish. However some compensation has been paid to impacted people a decade after the spill, the water actually stays dim and tricky, the mangroves covered with dark mud and the springs, which are presently a combination of unrefined and water, have now turned into the main wellspring of fish named perilous to wellbeing.
