= Dorman Long Engineering Limited =

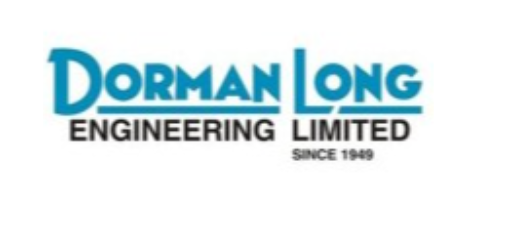
- Type: Private
- Industry: Structural engineering, oil and gas services, fabrication
- Founded: 1949
- Headquarters: Lagos, Nigeria
- Area served: Nigeria and Sub-Saharan Africa
- Key people: Dr. Timi Austen-Peters (Chairman); Engr. Chris Ijeli (Managing Director/CEO)
- Services: Steel fabrication, engineering procurement and construction services, industrial equipment manufacturing, galvanising, maintenance
- Website: https://www.dormanlongeng.com

Dorman Long Engineering Limited is a Nigerian engineering and fabrication company that provides structural steelwork, industrial equipment manufacturing, and oil and gas engineering services. The company is headquartered in Lagos and operates across multiple industrial sectors including energy, power, and infrastructure.

== History ==
Dorman Long Engineering Limited was incorporated in Nigeria in 1949 under registration number RC-744. During the mid-20th century, the company participated in steel fabrication and construction projects supporting Nigeria's industrial expansion, including facilities in the Ikeja and Trans-Amadi industrial zones.

By the early 2000s, the company had expanded into oil and gas engineering, undertaking fabrication contracts for storage tanks, pipelines, pressure vessels, and platform components. It has also achieved international certifications such as ASME U and NB stamps for pressure vessel manufacturing.

In 2024, the company marked over 75 years of industrial operations in Nigeria.

== Operations and services ==
Dorman Long Engineering specialises in:

- Structural steel fabrication for bridges and industrial facilities
- Manufacture of fuel and water storage tanks
- Oilfield equipment and pipeline fabrication
- Hot-dip galvanising services
- Engineering procurement and construction
- Industrial maintenance and asset-management services

== Corporate governance ==
The company's board is chaired by Dr. Timi Austen-Peters.

The managing director and chief executive officer is Chris Ijeli, whose appointment was announced in 2023.

== Milestones ==
- 1949 – Company incorporated.
- 2000s – Expansion into oil and gas fabrication.
- 2023 – Appointment of MD/CEO Engr. Chris Ijeli.
- 2024 – 75th anniversary of operations.

== See also ==
- Structural engineering
- Oil and gas industry in Nigeria
- Manufacturing companies in Nigeria
