= Bomu Community =

Community in Gokana, Rivers State, Nigeria

Coordinates: 4°38′00″N 7°18′15″E

Bomu is a community located in Gokana Local Government Area of Rivers State, Nigeria. Bomu as a community shares boundaries with Lewe, Bodo, Gbe and Mogho community all in Gokana LGA. The paramount ruler of Bomu community His Royal Highness His Royal Highness Benedict Tenalo.

Bomu community is one of the communities in Gokana that has an oil field which is popularly called Bomu Oil Field in Gokana LGA.

== Crisis ==
From 2018 to 2020, Bomu community had a fight with Lewe community over a misunderstanding. this communal crisis has claimed lives and properties from the two communities involved. Chief Justina Lebera A woman leader in Bomu community said the women were not allowed to farm due to fear during the communal crisis.

In the year 2021, the Gokana council Chairman Confidence Deko commenced steps to resolving the crisis by setting up a peace and reconciliation committee with a mandate to find a lasting solution to the crisis. and peace was restored back in both communities.
