= Gokana kingdom =

Kingdom of the Ogoni people of Nigeria

Gokana kingdom is among the six kingdoms of the Ogoni people in Ogoni (also Ogoniland) in the Niger Delta region of Nigeria. Gokana kingdom has geographic, historic and ethno-linguistic elements with some 130,000 Gokana language speakers located in the Gokana Local Government Area in Rivers State.

Gokana is a local government area that is located in Rivers state, in the South South geopolitical zone of Nigeria. The headquarter of the LGA is found in the town of Kpor, while the Gokana area comprises several towns and villages which includes Nwe-biara, Yeghe, Gbe, Goi, Barako, Kibangba, Bomu, Deken, and Bera etc. The estimated population of Gokana LGA is 194,713 inhabitants, with the vast majority of the people that inhabit the area being members of the Ogoni ethnic sub-division. The Gokana kingdom speaks the Gokana language as it is predominantly spoken in the area. Christianity is the religion that is mostly practiced although they still have traditionalist in the area. The Gbere Mene of Gokana LGA is the traditional administrator of the LGA while important festivals held in the area include the Naa Bira Dae festival which is usually celebrated in the month of April after Easter.

Gokana kingdom is sub-divided into two zones, namely; Kibangha and the Numuu zone. The traditional headquarter of Gokana kingdom is Giokoo.

== Villages ==
Gokana contains a tremendous number of villages, including

- Lewe
- B.Dere (Barayowa-Dere)
- K. Dere (Kegbara-Dere)
- Nwe-biara
- Kpor
- Mogho
- Bomu
- Bodo
- Gio-koo
- Nwe-ol
- Bera
- Biara
- Deeyor
- Gbe
- Goi
- Barako
- Deken, and
- Yeghe.

== Geography ==
Gokana LGA sits on a total area measuring 126 square kilometres and had a population of 228,828 at the 2006 census, which has several rivers and tributaries flowing through its territory. The average temperature of the LGA is 26 °C or 79 °F, while the average humidity level of the area is 87 percent.

== Economy ==
Gokana people are mainly farmers, as farming is a key economic activity in Gokana LGA. A variety of crops such as plantain, oil palm, cassava, okra, melon, and banana are grown in the area. They are also fishermen, as fishing is another important occupation engaged in by the people of Gokana, given the abundance of rivers and tributaries being rich in seafood. Other important economic enterprises of the people of Gokana include trades, the making of fishing nets, and the construction of canoes.
