= Trans-Niger Pipeline =

Oil pipeline in Nigeria

Location
- Country: Nigeria
- State: Nigeria
- Province: Rivers State, Ogoniland

General information
- Type: oil
- Owner: Shell Petroleum Development Company of Nigeria

Technical information
- Maximum discharge: 180,000 barrels per day (29,000 m^{3}/d)

The Trans-Niger Pipeline (TNP) is a major oil pipeline in Nigeria's Niger Delta, used to transport crude from oil fields through Ogoniland communities to export terminals. The pipeline has a transporting capacity of about 180,000 barrels of crude per day and was operated by Shell Petroleum Development Company of Nigeria till March 2025. Renaissance Africa Energy Holdings took over operations of the pipeline after acquiring Shell's onshore subsidiary.

== Incidents ==
After a leak on the Trans-Niger Pipeline at Oloma in southern Rivers State in August 2015, Shell shut down both the Trans-Niger Pipeline and Nembe Creek Trunk Line and declared “force majeure” on crude oil exports. The pipeline was closed again on November 22, 2015, after an incident in which four contractors were killed during an operation to remove crude oil theft points.

In August 2022, a joint investigation visit by the National Oil Spill Detection and Response Agency (NOSDRA) found that a leak that occurred a week earlier on the Trans-Niger Pipeline in Bodo, Rivers State, was caused by third-party interference.

In April 2023, Shell Petroleum Development Company of Nigeria reported that they had detected and removed 460 illegal connections on the Trans-Niger Pipeline before resuming operations after a one-year shutdown.

On June 11, 2023, the Trans-Niger Pipeline burst open, spilling crude oil into Alete community in the Eleme local government area, Rivers State. Okulu River, which is the source of water for farms and residents of five communities, was also contaminated. The leak was eventually contained. In October 2023, 37 people were reported dead after an explosion at an illegal refinery that tapped the Trans-Niger Pipeline in Ibaa community in Emohua local government area.

During a sweep and clear operation on the Trans-Niger Pipeline in February 2024, the Nigerian Army uncovered over 40 illegal wells containing crude oil in Rumuekpe community, Emohua local government area of Rivers State. The wells were mostly 12 by 12 feet in both width and length, and about 40 feet in depth.

In April 2024, the Minister of State for Petroleum Resources (Oil), Heineken Lokpobiri, said problems encountered on the Trans-Niger Pipeline and other maintenance activities were the reasons for the drop in crude oil production in the first quarter of 2024.

In July 2024, a fresh oil spill occurred along the Trans-Niger Pipeline in Bodo community, Gokana local government area of Rivers State. It was attributed to equipment failure.

In March 2025, an explosion was reported on the Trans-Niger Pipeline, putting 450,000 barrels of crude oil production at risk. Operations resumed shortly thereafter, with oil being rerouted through an alternative line.
