= Togo Triangle =

The Togo Triangle is an offshore market for stolen oil off the coast of Nigeria and Togo near the Niger Delta. The Triangle has been compared to an "open-air drug market" for trade in illegal crude oil, noted for the presence of pirates.
