= Bodo, Nigeria =

Town in Rivers State, Nigeria

Bodo
- Town
- Location in Nigeria
- Coordinates: 4°37′N 7°16′E
- Country: Nigeria
- State: Rivers State
- LGA: Gokana

Population
  - Estimate (2010): 69,000
- Time zone: UTC+1 (WAT)

Bodo is a town in the Gokana local government area of Rivers State, Nigeria. Inhabited by Ogonis, it is located within Ogoniland. In 2010, the community had a population of around 69,000 people. A fishing and farming town, Bodo is known for having been the site of several severe oil spills in the 21st century.

== Economy ==
The main occupations in Bodo are fishing and farming. A lot of the farming work is done by hand, and by women. Cassava is one of the main staple crops of the town and of the region. Goat meat is also a local delicacy, and many inhabitants of Bodo raise goats.

== Oil spills ==
In 2003, a "relatively small" oil spill affected the mangroves in Bodo.

In 2008 and 2009, two oil spills from the Trans-Niger pipeline operated by Shell Nigeria spilled at least 560,000 barrels of oil into the village's land, one of the biggest spills in decades of oil exploration in Nigeria. As a fishing town, the livelihoods of the majority of Bodo's inhabitants were destroyed. Fish populations were decimated, mangroves were destroyed, and water, fruits, and trees were all contaminated. People's health was also widely affected during the years following the oil spill. In January 2015, Shell was forced to pay £55 million in compensation for the 2008 and 2009 oil spills in Bodo, with £35 million going directly to affected individuals and the other £20 million to the Bodo community. At the time, the settlement was thought to be the largest payout to any African community following environmental damage. However, by 2017, Bodo residents were still waiting for cleanup efforts promised to them by Shell.

In October 2022, a fresh oil spill was detected in Bodo, once again due to the Trans-Niger pipeline operated by Shell. Bodo also witnessed another oil spill on Friday, August 18, 2023 at the Sugi area of Bodo Community, close to where multiple oil spills were recorded in recent times on the trans-Niger Delta pipeline, operated by Shell Petroleum Development Company of Nigeria (SPDC) Ltd. In July 2024, yet another oil spill due to the Trans-Niger pipeline detected destroying farmlands.
