= Aiteo =

Nigerian energy conglomerate

- Type: Limited Liability Company
- Industry: Oil and Gas
- Predecessor: Sigmund Communecci (1999)
- Founded: February 2008
- Headquarters: Lagos, Nigeria
- Key people: Benedict Peters (Founder and CEO); Victor Okoronkwo (Group Managing Director)
- Products: Petroleum; Natural Gas; Electric Power
- Website: www.aiteo.com

Aiteo is Africa's largest privately owned integrated energy company. It is involved in various aspects of the energy sector, including oil and gas exploration, production, refining, and marketing. Aiteo operates in West and Southern Africa.

== History ==
Founded in 1999 by pan-African billionaire Benedict Peters, Aiteo originally operated under the name Sigmund Communnecci Limited. Sigmund Communnecci was primarily engaged in the supply and trading of a wide range of petroleum products. As one of Africa's largest indigenous importers of energy products, Sigmund Communnecci owned and operated a petroleum storage terminal in Abonnema Wharf, Port Harcourt, in Nigeria's South-South region.

In 2008, Sigmund Communnecci rebranded as Aiteo. The change was more than an alteration of its name; it represented a shift in corporate strategy, aiming to elevate the company's position in the energy industry. With the rebranding, Aiteo expanded its focus, committing to develop a comprehensive range of energy services. This expansion covered the full spectrum of the energy sector, from exploration to the retail delivery of finished petroleum products and electrical power.

Aiteo is a fully integrated energy company. It is actively engaged in the storage, marketing, and distribution of bulk petroleum products, provision of oilfield services, generation and distribution of electricity, large-scale storage of LPG, and an increasingly prominent retail distribution network. Its growth has been characterized by strategic investments and consistent expansion. Aiteo boasts one of the largest privately owned refined petroleum product storage facilities in Sub-Saharan Africa. Its assets include storage facilities capable of holding over 320 million liters of petroleum products. Key among these are the Port Harcourt terminal with a capacity exceeding 110 million liters and the Apapa terminal, capable of storing 210 million liters.

Aiteo is Africa's largest oil independent. Aiteo produces nearly 100,000 barrels of oil per day from OML 29, a producing conventional oil field located onshore Nigeria, contributing over five percent to Nigeria's daily oil output, as reported in 2015.

In November 2023, Aiteo achieved a significant landmark in the Nigerian oil and gas industry by introducing Nembe, a new crude oil grade, in partnership with the Nigerian National Petroleum Corporation (NNPC). Nembe crude is characterized by its low sulphur content and reduced carbon footprint, attributed to the elimination of flare gas. This makes it align with the stringent specifications of key European buyers. The management and marketing of the Nembe crude stream are undertaken by a joint venture between NNPC and Aiteo Eastern E&P Co. Ltd. This initiative marks the first time a crude marketing venture in Nigeria is exclusively operated by local entities.

In January 2024, Aiteo secured a stake in Mozambique’s Mazenga gas block. The deal, formalized through farm-in arrangements with Mozambique's National Hydrocarbons Company (ENH), positions Aiteo as the operator of the block, which holds some of the largest onshore gas reserves in Sub-Saharan Africa.

In February 2024, the Atlantic Council unveiled a three-year initiative targeting critical minerals in Africa, in collaboration with Aiteo. The initiative will feature the creation of a task force dedicated to critical minerals, bringing together stakeholders from the United States, Europe, and Africa, including representatives from the finance industry, development agencies, and government bodies. On the backdrop of the worldwide competition for critical minerals, the task force is set to meet regularly in Washington, D.C., to explore the significance and capabilities of African minerals in U.S. and EU supply chains, strategies for enhancing the participation of African countries and suppliers, and methods to more effectively engage the private sector.

== Operations ==
=== Upstream ===
Aiteo is engaged in oil exploration and drilling primarily in Nigerian offshore and onshore locations. Oil production is then transported and stored at high-capacity depots in its Port Harcourt Storage Depot on Abonema Island and its Apapa Storage Depot in the Apapa area of Lagos.

In 2014, an Aiteo-led consortium acquired Shell’s equity shares in the prolific Oil Mining Lease (OML) 29 and the Nembe Creek Trunk Line for $2.7 billion.

Aiteo's acquisition of Shell's assets, specifically OML 29 and the Nembe Creek Trunk Line, was a significant event in the Nigerian petroleum sector. The transaction was finalized in the third quarter of 2014 and had a transformative impact on both Aiteo and the Nigerian oil and gas industry.

The acquisition involved Aiteo obtaining an 85% equity stake in OML 29, which was being divested by Shell Petroleum Development Company (SPDC). This asset was recognized as one of Shell's most prolific oil blocks. The deal, which included the Nembe Creek Trunk Line, was valued at $2.7 billion. This move was not only a major investment by Aiteo but also a significant stride in boosting local content and indigenous participation in the Nigerian oil and gas sector.

The transaction was marked by its size and complexity, with Nigerian banks playing a crucial role. They provided a substantial portion of the financing for this acquisition, underlining the growing capability of local financial institutions to support major transactions in the oil and gas sector. This acquisition was part of a larger trend in Nigeria, where indigenous companies were increasingly taking over onshore assets from international oil companies.

OML 29

The purchase of OML 29 and the Nembe Creek Trunk Line represented a major boost for Nigeria's local content development initiative. OML 29 has proven and probable reserves of about 2.2 billion barrels of oil equivalent and a capacity to deliver significant quantities of oil and gas. This included a greater role for local players.

This acquisition also led to a shift in the operatorship of these assets, highlighting a significant change in the industry practice and emphasizing the emergence of indigenous companies in the onshore and shallow waters of Nigeria's oil and gas sector.

=== Engineering and Oilfield Services ===
Through its subsidiary company, Avidor Engineering and Oilfield Services, Aiteo provides a full range of oilfield services to the Niger Delta region.

=== Midstream Operations ===
Aiteo owns and operates two on-shore storage depots that have a vast reservoir that can supply all of Nigeria's needs for many days. Its Port Harcourt Storage Depot on Abonnema Island also has a jetty that enables large vessels to dock. It is the largest and most technically advanced storage facility outside Lagos. It has a depot capacity of more than 100 million liters of storage for white products while its jetty accommodates vessels of up to 20,000 metric tonnes dead weight.

The company also owns the Apapa Storage Depot, located in the Apapa area of Lagos. It is one of the largest storage facilities in Nigeria with a capacity of approximately 90 million liters.

=== Downstream Operations ===
Aiteo supplies independent filling stations across Nigeria and in neighboring countries with petroleum products, and operate two Aiteo-owned filling stations strategically located in the eastern and northern regions. The company also owns a fleet of tanker trucks that deliver fuel within and across Nigerian borders, ensuring a steady supply of petroleum products for filling stations and their customers.

=== Power Generation and Electricity Distribution ===
Aiteo's power generation group is working to harness Nigeria's vast natural gas resources and generate energy from Nigeria's indigenous and renewable resources, with a particular focus on hydroelectric power.

== Corporate affairs ==
Aiteo is led by its founder and CEO, Benedict Peters. The managing director of the company is Victor Okoronkwo.
