= Nembe Creek Trunk Line =

Location
- Country: Nigeria
- State: Nigeria
- Province: Rivers State, Niger Delta
- Direction: East-West
- Start: Bonny Export Terminal
- Passes through: Cawthorne Channel Field
- To: Bonny Crude Oil Terminal (BCOT)

General information
- Type: oil
- Owner: Aiteo Eastern Exploration & Production Company; Former owner: Royal Dutch Shell plc
- Construction started: 2006
- Commissioned: 2010

Technical information
- Length: 97 km (60 mi)
- Maximum discharge: 600,000 barrels per day (95,000 m^{3}/d)
- Diameter: 48 in (1,219 mm)
- No. of pumping stations: 14

Nembe Creek Trunk Line (NCTL) is a 97 kilometre, 150,000 barrels of oil per day pipeline constructed by Royal Dutch Shell plc and situated in the Niger Delta region of Nigeria. "The Trunk Line is one of Nigeria's major oil transportation arteries that evacuate crude from the Niger Delta to the Atlantic coast for export." It is owned by Aiteo Group, which recently purchased it as part of the related facilities of the prolific oil bloc OML29 from Shell Petroleum Development Company, SPDC. By March 2015, the Shell Petroleum Development Company of Nigeria Limited (SPDC), a subsidiary of Royal Dutch Shell plc (Shell), completed the assignment of its interest in OML29 and the Nembe Creek Trunk Line to Aiteo Eastern E&P Company Limited, a subsidiary of Aiteo Group. The other joint venture partners, Total E&P Nigeria Limited and Nigerian Agip Oil Company Limited also assigned their interests of 10% and 5% respectively in the lease, ultimately giving Aiteo Eastern E&P Company Limited a 45% interest in OML29 and the Nembe Creek Trunk Line.

== History ==
Nembe Creek Trunk Line (NCTL) was constructed by Shell Petroleum Development Company, SPDC, to evacuate crude oil from the oil fields of OML29 for export; starting from "Nembe Creek, to a manifold at the Cawthorne Channel field on OML 18. From here, crude is evacuated the short distance to the Bonny oil terminal. This pipeline has a capacity of 150,000 b/d at Nembe Creek, however, up to 600,000 b/d of liquids can be evacuated from the end point at Cawthorne Channel."

The construction of the Nembe Creek Trunk Line (NCTL) was begun in 2006 and was commissioned in 2010 at the cost of $1.1 billion. It was constructed as a replacement to the ageing and often vandalized Nembe Creek Pipeline which had suffered significant losses due to incessant fires, sabotage, and theft. The project is rated as "the largest single project under the SPDC joint venture's asset integrity programme that replaced more than 1000 km of deteriorated major pipelines and flowlines".

== Technical description ==
The project involved the construction of three sections of pipeline including:

- 5 km of 12 inch diameter pipeline from the Nembe Creek III manifold to the Nembe Creek tie-in manifold
- 44 km of 24 inch diameter pipeline from Nembe Creek to San Bartholomew
- 46 km of 30 inch diameter pipeline from San Bartholomew to Cawthorne Channel

== Operators ==
Built at the cost of $1.1 billion by the Shell Petroleum Development Company of Nigeria Ltd Joint Venture (SPDC), comprising Total E&P Nigeria Limited and Nigerian Agip Oil Company Limited. The trans Niger Delta pipeline is currently operated by Aiteo Group.

== Oil theft ==
Shell Petroleum Development Company (SPDC) in early 2012, "raised the alarm concerning heightened oil theft activities on its Nembe Creek Trunkline (NCTL)." Shell estimated conservatively that 140,000 barrels of crude oil valued at $16 million was being stolen daily.

On 2 May 2012, Shell Petroleum Development Company of Nigeria Ltd Joint Venture (SPDC) shut down the Nembe Creek Trunk Line (NCTL) due to "incessant crude theft activities". On 13 May 2014, "two six inches lines" through which oil was being stolen from the pipeline was disconnected. In December 2011, barely one year after the line was commissioned, the pipeline was "shut down for one month to repair leaks caused by crude thieves."

Oil theft on the Nembe Creek Trunk Line (NCTL) significantly impacted on Shells exportation of the Bonny Light. On 4 May 2012, Shell Petroleum Development Company of Nigeria Ltd (SPDC) was compelled by "production deferment caused by incessant crude theft and illegal bunkering on Nembe Creek Trunkline (NCTL) to declare force majeure on outstanding cargoes of Bonny Light."

The integrity of the old Nembe Creek Pipeline which Nembe Creek Trunk Line (NCTL) replaced, was severally weakened by "crude theft points" that oil thieves installed on the pipeline. Within two years of the new Nembe Creek Trunk Line (NCTL) being commissioned into use, it has been "repeatedly targeted by crude thieves, requiring that SPDC must now shut down sections of the line to allow the removal of illegal bunkering points."
