= Oloibiri Oilfield =

Onshore oilfield in Oloibiri, Bayelsa State, Nigeria

Oloibiri
- Location of the Oloibiri oil field within Nigeria
- Country: Nigeria
- Region: Niger Delta
- Location: Bayelsa State
- Block: OML29
- Offshore/onshore: Onshore
- Coordinates: 4°41′30.12″N 6°21′33.3″E
- Operator: SPDC
- Partners: Royal Dutch Shell; BP (till 1979)

Field history
- Discovery: 15 January 1956
- Start of development: 1956
- Start of production: 1958
- Peak year: 1964
- Abandonment: 1978

Production
- Year of current production of oil: 1958
- Peak of production (oil): 5,100 barrels per day (~2.5×10^{5} t/a)
- Estimated oil in place: 40.94 million barrels (~5.585×10^{6} t)
- Recoverable oil: 20.06 million barrels (~2.737×10^{6} t)
- Producing formations: Agbada Formation

Oloibiri Oilfield is an onshore oilfield located in Oloibiri in Ogbia LGA of Bayelsa State, Nigeria, and was the first to be discovered in that country. It is located about 45 miles (72 km) east of Port Harcourt in the Niger Delta. Oloibiri field is about 13.75 square kilometres (5.31 sq mi) and lies in a swamp within OML 29

Oloibiri Oilfield is named after Oloibiri, ano small, remote creek community, where it is located. In Nigeria, oilfields are usually named after the host community where it is located or a local landmark. Sometimes, oilfields are also given names taken from indigenous languages.

The field is currently operated by Shell Petroleum Development Company of Nigeria Limited (SPDC). The field was originally operated by Shell Darcy. On 30 April 1956, Shell Darcy changed its name to Shell-BP Petroleum Development Company of Nigeria Limited to reflect BP's interest. In 1979, it changed its name again to Shell Petroleum Development Company of Nigeria Limited(SPDC) following the nationalisation of BP's interest by the government.

== Exploration history ==
Oloibiri Oilfield was discovered on Sunday 15 January 1956 by Shell Darcy. It was the first commercial oil discovery in Nigeria; this discovery ended 50 years of unsuccessful oil exploration in the country by various international oil companies and launched Nigeria into the limelight of the Petro-State.

Following the discovery of oil in commercial quantities in Oloibiri, Shell stepped up exploration in the Niger Delta and by 1958 Shell Darcy had discovered oil in twelve areas in the Niger Delta of which Oloibiri, Afam and Bomu were the most promising.

The discovery well Oloibiri −1 was spudded on 3 August 1955 and drilled vertical to a total depth of 108 feet (3660m). The well was tested and it flowed at the rate of about 5,000 barrels (790 m^{3}) of oil per day and it was deemed to be a commercial discovery. Some gas was also discovered with the oil. The oil discovery was made in the Tertiary Agbada.

== Appraisal ==
Between 26 June 1956 and 28 October 1958, 11 appraisal wells were drilled vertical to the appraisal of the extension of the reservoir to different sections of the field. The first appraisal well was Oloibiri-2, it was spudded on 26 June 1956 and drilled vertically to a total depth of 2932m and it encountered oil in the Agbada Formation. Six of these appraisal wells were a success and encountered oil pay.

An appraisal well Oloibiri-17 was spudded on 9 June 1967 after 9 years of production and drilled deviated to a measured depth of 12520 feet (3816 mD) but the result was not encouraging. Oloibiri-17 was plugged and abandoned. The field production was on depletion from its peak production and the well was drilled to appraisal another section of the field so as to increase production.

Another appraisal well Oloibiri-18 was spudded on 21 April 1979 and drilled to a vertical depth of 9616 feet (2931 m) but the result was also discouraging. The field was almost depleted at that time. The main objective of the Oloibiri-18 was to appraise a new section and improve the drainage of the reservoir but the well was dry with shows and so it was plugged and abandoned.

== Development ==
Following the successful completion of the appraisal of the field, four development wells were drilled in 1958 (between 17 June 1958 and 27 November 1958) for the development of the field. The four development wells and the six successful appraisal wells were completed as oil production wells.

The discovery well, Oloibiri-1 was completed on 5 June 1956 as a commercial oil production well. Thus, Oloibiri-1 made history as the first truly commercial oil well in Nigeria. This brings the number of completed production wells on field to eleven.

== Production ==
The field started oil production between late 1957 and early 1958 and the first oil production from the field came at the rate of 4,928 barrels per day (783.5 m^{3}/d). The field produced at an average rate of 5,100 barrels (810 m^{3}) of oil per day for the first year. The production increased thereafter as more wells were completed and put onto production and reached its peak in 1964. The field was drained from eleven production wells. The oil produced from the field is sour and heavy and has an API of 20.6. The gas produced with the oil was flared off as a result of lack of gas processing and utilisation facility in the country then, so the gas was not considered necessary.

Royal Dutch Shell laid the first crude oil pipeline in the country from the Oloibiri field to Port Harcourt on Bonny River to access export facilities. Nigeria exported its first crude oil in February 1958 from the Oloibiri oil field, initially at the rate of 5,100 barrels per day (810 m^{3}/d). The oil was being pumped from the field via the country's first pipeline, laid by Shell.

The Oloibiri oilfield produced over 20 million barrels (3,200,000 m^{3}) of oil during its 20 years life cycle. Oil production finally stopped in 1978 and the field was abandoned the same year. The Oloibiri oilfield was abandoned without any improved recovery to drain some of the 21.26 million barrels (3,380,000 m^{3}) of hydrocarbon still left on the field.
