= Bomu oil field =

Oil field in Nigeria

The Bomu oil field is an oil field located in Gokana Local Government Area of the Eastern Niger Delta region of Nigeria. The discovery well was spudded in February 1958 and discovered 265 ft (81 m) of gas sands and 165 ft (50 m) of oil bearing sands of the Agbada formation. Production began in 1959 and the first stage of a 12 in (30 cm) pipeline connecting Bomu to the town of Bonny through Anam was completed in the same year.

Prior to the Nigerian Civil War, production reached 75,000 barrels per day with 26 oil producing wells and 3 water producing wells. In 1970, a blow-out occurred in one of the production wells at Bomu leading to the destruction of vegetation and farm crops.
