= Oil reserves in Nigeria =

Nigeria held an estimated 37.5 billion barrels of proved crude oil reserves in 2024. The country produced about 1.5 million barrels per day of crude oil and lease condensate during the year, down from its levels a decade earlier. Production has been affected by crude oil theft, pipeline vandalism, aging infrastructure and disruptions at upstream facilities. Nigeria exported about 1.3 million barrels per day of crude oil and condensate in 2024, with Europe receiving the largest share of exports. Fossil fuel revenues remain Nigeria's primary source of foreign exchange.

== Prospective resources ==
Nigeria and São Tomé have an agreement in which the Joint Development Authority was created to explore and produce oil in the waters between Sao Tome and Nigeria. Nigeria and Sao Tome share this area, called the Joint Development Zone, or JDZ. This area could contain up to, or over, 14 billion barrels of oil. In 2006, Chevron drilled an exploratory well called OBO-1 and news reports came out that they had discovered over a thousand million barrels of oil in block 1 alone. The news was reported on CNN and AP.
