= National Oil Spill Detection and Response Agency =

National agency in Nigeria

- NOSDRA

Agency overview
- Formed: 2007
- Jurisdiction: Federal Government of Nigeria
- Headquarters: Abuja, Nigeria
- Minister responsible: Dr. Mohammad Mahmoud
- Deputy Minister responsible: Chief Sharon Ikeazor
- Agency executive: Emeka Woke, Director General/Chief Executive Officer
- Parent department: Federal Ministry of Environment
- Website: nosdra.gov.ng

The National Oil Spill Detection and Response Agency (NOSDRA) is an agency under the Federal Ministry of Environment in Nigeria.

== History ==
It was instituted by the National Assembly of the Federal Republic of Nigeria act of 2006 with the core mandate to oversee the implementation of the National Oil Spill Contingency Plan (NOSCP) which also incorporates the National Oil Spill Contingency System (NOSCS) for Nigeria. This is to ensure compliance to Nigeria's signatory to the International Convention on Oil Pollution Preparedness, Response and Cooperation (OPRC, 1990). Therefore, the agency has focused on building conformance with environment legislation in the Nigerian petroleum sector from inception. NOSDRA is the lead agency for other oil spill contingency plans in Nigeria, including the ports and industries. It fulfils its mandate through joint investigation visits, environmental remediation of impacted sites, monitoring oil spill drill exercises and facilitating inspections.

These activities are carried out across the country through their zonal offices located mostly in the Niger-Delta region including Port Harcourt, Warri, and Uyo where oil exploration and production are prevalent. They also have zonal offices in Lagos, Kaduna, Kogi, Gombe and Akure, with their headquarters in Abuja, Nigeria. However, the agency implements tier three oil spill response monitoring from its national control and response centre. They employ the oil spill monitor and gas flare tracker in reporting oil and gas pollution related matters. The frequency of oil spill incidents recorded by the agency prompted them to commence the development of a National Oil Spill Compensation Rate (NOSCR) in 2017 to guide the oil industry in establishing an acceptable and appropriate compensation to host and transit oil communities.

The agency prioritizes high-risk areas for protection and effective clean-up with the aid of a baseline environmental sensitivity index map (ESI) and covers the midstream and downstream in its environmental compliance monitoring role. Despite the scope of the NOSDRA, it is perceived not to be exhaustive and resulted in a demand for amendment in 2017. The amendment proposed to replace it with the National Oil Pollution Management Agency (NOPMA) and to expand its provisions to tackle not only oil spillage, but also oily waste, gas flare and obnoxious substances in the country's petroleum sector. It also calls for provisions to regulate all tiers of oil spills, increased fines and penalties for polluters and improved funding. The amendment bill passed by the Nigerian National Assembly in 2019 was refused by the president, Muhammadu Buhari as a result of the observations in the proposed legislation.
