= Shell Nigeria =

Nigerian regional subsidiary of Shell plc

Shell Petroleum Development Company of Nigeria Limited
- Formerly: Shell D'Arcy (1936–56)
- Type: Subsidiary
- Industry: Oil & Gas
- Founded: 1936; 90 years ago
- Headquarters: Lagos State, Nigeria
- Parent: Shell plc
- Website: shell.com.ng

Shell Nigeria is the common name for Shell plc's Nigerian operations carried out through four subsidiaries—primarily Shell Petroleum Development Company of Nigeria Limited (SPDC). Royal Dutch Shell's joint ventures account for more than 21% of Nigeria's total petroleum production (629,000 barrels per day (100,000 m^{3}/d) (bpd) in 2009).

The company has been controversial in communities in the Niger Delta, who point to its poor environmental record and that most of the economic benefit from oil exploitation has not benefited local communities. In particular, when, in 1993 the Movement for the Survival of the Ogoni People (MOSOP) organized large protests against Shell and the government, it led to repression of the local community.

The company has been responsible for some significant oil spills in the Niger delta, and both Nigerian and European courts have held them liable for environmental destruction. One of the most significant cases was at one of Shell's oil extraction facilities located in the Ejama-Ebubu community.

== History ==
Shell started business in Nigeria in 1938 as "Shell D'Arcy" and was granted an exploration license. In 1956, Shell Nigeria discovered the first commercial oil field at Oloibiri in the Niger Delta and started oil exports in 1958. Prior to the discovery of oil, Nigeria like many other African countries strongly relied on agricultural exports to other countries to support its economy.

In March 2025, Shell completed the divestment of its Niger Delta subsidiary to a Nigerian consortium, Renaissance Africa Energy Holdings, in a $1.3 billion transaction. The deal had been delayed by regulators due to concerns over the new owners' ability to manage the assets and environmental liabilities. Shell's divestment aligns with its intent to simplify its presence in Nigeria and focus on deepwater and integrated gas positions.

== Recent news ==
In July 2013, Shell Nigeria awarded Kaztec engineering Limited a $84.5 million exploration and production contract for the Trans-Niger oil pipeline.

On 25 March 2014, Shell Nigeria declared a force majeure on crude oil exports from its Forcados crude oil depot which stopped operations due to a leak in its underwater pipeline, a clause freeing the company from contractual obligations as a circumstance beyond its control happened. While it struggled with repairing the pipeline, Royal Dutch Shell announced a force majeure on Nigerian crude oil exports.

== Structure ==
Shell Petroleum Development Company (SPDC) is the largest fossil fuel company in Nigeria, which operates over 6,000 kilometres (3,700 mi) of pipelines and flowlines, 87 flowstations, 8 natural gas plants and more than 1,000 producing wells. SPDC's role in the Shell Nigeria family is typically confined to the physical production and extraction of petroleum. It is an operator of the joint venture, which composed of Nigerian National Petroleum Corporation (55%), Shell (30%), TotalEnergies (10%) and Eni (5%).

== Impact ==
In the 1990s, tensions arose between the native Ogoni people of the Niger Delta and Shell. The concerns of the locals were that very little of the money earned from oil on their land was getting to the people who live there, and the environmental damages caused by the recurring sabotage of pipelines operated by Shell. In 1993 the Movement for the Survival of the Ogoni People (MOSOP) organized large protests against Shell and the government, often occupying the company production facilities. Shell withdrew its operations from the Ogoni areas. The Nigerian government raided their villages and arrested some of the protest leaders. Some of these arrested protesters, Ken Saro-Wiwa being the most prominent, were later executed, against widespread international opposition from the Commonwealth of Nations and human rights organisations.

The ethnic unrest and conflicts of the late 1990s (such as those between the Ijaw, Urhobo and Itsekiri), coupled with a peak in the availability of small arms and other weapons, led increasingly to the militarization of the Delta. By this time, local and state officials had offered financial support to those paramilitary groups they believed would attempt to enforce their own political agenda. Conflagrations have been concentrated primarily in Delta and Rivers States.

Shell maintained that it asked the Nigerian government for clemency towards those found guilty but its request was declined. A 2001 Greenpeace report mentioned two witnesses for whom the company and the Nigerian military "bribed" by promising money and jobs at the facility. Shell gave money to the military and was blamed for contaminating the Niger Delta with oil. The company denied these claims and implied that MOSOP was an extortionary movement that advocated violence and secession.

In December 2003, Shell Nigeria acknowledged that the conflict in the Niger Delta makes it difficult to operate safely and with integrity and that "we sometimes feed conflict by the way we award contracts, gain access to land, and deal with community representatives", and that it intends to improve on its practices. In 2009, Shell offered to settle the Ken Saro-Wiwa case with US$15.5 million while denying any wrongdoings and calling the settlement a humanitarian gesture. According to the New York Times and the journalist Michael D. Goldhaber, the settlement came days before the start of a trial in New York that was expected to reveal extensive details of Shell's and MOSOP's activities in the Niger Delta.

== Oil spills ==
The heavy contamination of the air, ground and water with toxic pollutants from oil spills in the Niger Delta is often used as an example of ecocide.

Individuals from villages surrounding oil production facilities occasionally drill holes into Shell Oil pipelines for the purposes of capturing oil and transporting it illegally out of Nigeria for monetary gain. This process, known as "oil bunkering", is estimated to cost Nigeria as much as 400,000 barrels of crude oil per day. Typically, when the oil theft operation is finished, the pipeline is left open, which results in an oil spill.

In addition to the spills caused by 'oil bunkering', oils spills can also occur as a result of the quality of the equipment being used to extract and transport the oil. These spills are referred to as 'operational spills' and can be caused by corrosion, a lack of regular maintenance of the equipment, and overall underinvestment in the equipment being used. 18.7% of the spills reported by Shell since 2011 are labeled to be 'operational spills'. Oil spills can also occur as a result of natural hazards causing damage to pipelines.

In 1970, there was an oil spill from a Shell pipeline caused primarily by corrosion and operational failure resulting in over 250 barrels of oil spilled. The resulting effects included the pollution of the surrounding air, water, and soil, as well as, a loss of the surrounding ecological and aquatic species. Health problems in the surrounding areas were also cited as an impact of the oil spill. In 1978, another spill from a Shell pipeline due to corrosion and operational failure was reported to have leaked 580,000 barrels of oil. The resulting impacts were air, water, and soil pollution in the area of the spill.

In 2006, a team of experts in environmental assessments from Nigeria, the United Kingdom, and the United States were independently organized to conduct a Natural Resource Damage Assessment in the Niger Delta. They concluded that over the past fifty years, an estimated nine million to thirteen million barrels of oil had been spilled in the Niger Delta. Shell is responsible for around fifty percent of the oil production in Niger Delta. Between 1998 and 2009, Shell oil was responsible for 491, 627 barrels of oil spilled, averaging about 41,000 barrels per year.

In 2011, Shell started publishing the reports it has been required to take every time an oil spill occurs. These reports, titled 'Joint Investigation Visit' or JIV, record when the spill began, where the spill took place, the cause of the spill, and the estimated amount of oil lost. JIV reports are important to not only keep track of the oil spills, but also to determine whether or not the surrounding communities will be able to receive forms of compensation for any damage on their homes, fisheries, or fields resulting from the oil spilled. Communities receive compensation only if the spill is not caused by sabotage or third party interference. This practice is based on Nigeria's 1990 Oil Pipelines Act that requires the company to compensate any person that is suffering from the damages of an oil spill, unless caused by a third party. The data from these reports have been published online since 2015 by the National Oil Spill Detection and Response Agency (NOSDRA). Since 2011, 1,010 oil spills with an overall sum of 110,535 barrels, or 17.5 million liters, of oil have been reported as lost by Shell.

=== Reporting practices and response ===
Nigerian government regulations legally require companies to report a spill within twenty-four hours of the spill, then conduct a JIV report within the next twenty-four hours following. In addition, the repair and clean-up of the spill is also required to begin within the first twenty-four hours of when the spill was discovered. Shell's response time has been reported to rarely be within these regulations. In only 25.7% of the spills that have occurred since 2011, Shell has conducted JIV reports within the first twenty-hours of a spill being reported. Oftentimes, it has been reported that Shell and other oil companies do not begin to clean up the spills until after the reports are conducted delaying the response time even further. Shell does state that the pipelines are shut off in the event of a spill being reported, however, the oil that has already been spilled is still left in the environment. For example, 252 days passed before Shell visited the site of an oil spill that was reported in February 2016. Another case in May, 2015 took Shell 190 days to visit after a report had been made. Both spills were reportedly in areas that were easily accessible providing limited excuse for the companies delayed responses. On average, Shell took around 9.68 days to respond and conduct JIV reports for spills that occurred in water and around 5.35 days to respond and conduct JIV reports for spills that occurred on land. Underreporting on the amount of oil spilled during each incident can also be attributed to the high volatility of oil resulting in the evaporation of about 50% of the exposed oil within twenty-four to forty-eight hours of the initial spill.

Amnesty International and Friends of the Earth International contested Shell's claims that up to 98% of all oil spills in Nigeria were due to sabotage. The two groups filed a complaint against the company in the OECD. Under Nigerian law, Shell has no liability when spills are classified as result of sabotage. Soon after, Shell representatives were heard by the Dutch Parliament and Shell revised its estimates from 98% to 70%. It was the second time the company did such a large revision to its oil spill statistics. A Dutch court ruled in 2013 that Shell is liable for the pollution in the Niger Delta.

Shell faced their oil spill response practices in November 2014 during legal action that was taken in the United Kingdom. The spill that was contested was from the Trans-Niger Pipeline in 2008 where 1640 barrels of oil were reported by Shell and a second spill in 2009 where Shell reported 4000 barrels of oil were spilled. In court, the assessment was proven to be extremely under-estimated and Shell ended up committing to a compensation of 55 million pounds.

== Controversies ==
=== Corruption allegations ===
Shell and Italy's Eni will stand trial in Italy over allegations of corruption in the 2011 purchase of a big offshore oil field in Nigeria known as OPL 245. Shell and Eni reportedly paid $1.3 billion in bribes. According to Barnaby Pace of campaign group Global Witness, "This trial should be a wake-up call to the oil industry. Some of the most senior executives at two of the biggest companies in the world could face prison sentences for a deal that was struck under their watch."

In March 2018, Shell filed a criminal complaint against Peter Robinson, a former vice president for sub-Saharan Africa. Shell said the two cases were unrelated. In 2022, both Eni and Shell were acquitted.

=== Nigeria environmental impact ===
In 2009, Shell was the subject of an Amnesty International report into the deterioration of human rights as a consequence of Shell's activities in the Niger Delta. In particular, Amnesty criticised the continuation of gas flaring and Shell's slow response to oil spills. In 1998, in its first public report on community and environmental issues in Nigeria, Shell promised "to end the practice of gas flaring in ten years, while pledging to establish a youth training scheme in Ogoniland".

Shell Oil has maintained that the issues of pollution of the Niger Delta is brought about by illegal refining of crude oil, sabotage and theft of oil field infrastructure. Research by Amnesty International, CEHRD and Friends of the Earth provide examples of cases where Shell claimed the cause of a spill was sabotage, but this claim was subsequently called into question by other investigations or the courts. This evidence, which includes video footage of an oil spill investigation where the cause of the spill was changed, by Shell, from "equipment failure" to "sabotage, following the field investigation, has been shared with Shell.

Under Nigerian law the operating company is responsible for cleaning up oil spills from its facilities, even if the spill is the result of third-party action. Therefore, the human and environmental impact of Shell's failure to properly clean up pollution cannot be defended by reference to illegal activity that, allegedly, caused the oil spills.

=== Nigeria military assaults ===
In the beginning of 1996, several human rights groups brought cases to hold Shell accountable for alleged human rights violations in Nigeria, including summary execution, crimes against humanity, torture, inhumane treatment and arbitrary arrest and detention. In particular, Shell stood accused of collaborating in the execution of Ken Saro-Wiwa and eight other leaders of the Ogoni tribe of southern Nigeria, who were hanged in 1995 by Nigeria's then military rulers. The lawsuits were brought against Royal Dutch Shell and Brian Anderson, the head of its Nigerian operation. In 2009, Shell agreed to pay $15.5m in a legal settlement. Shell has not accepted any liability over the allegations against it.

Shell has also been accused of complicity in the deaths of villagers in 1990. During peaceful protests at Umuechem village, the company had requested the assistance of a paramilitary police unit. According to Amnesty International, the company should have known the risks as there had been many violent incidents involving the Nigerian government in Ogoniland. The police attacked the village with guns and grenades, killing 80 people and burning 595 houses.

In 2010, a leaked cable revealed Shell boasting about having inserted staff into all the main ministries of the Nigerian government and knowing everything that was being done in those ministries. Court documents released in 2009 have revealed that in the 1990s, Shell routinely worked with Nigeria's military and mobile police to subdue resistance to its oil activities, often concerning Ogoniland activists, in the delta region. Shell also provided logistic support during the crackdown, and made a suspicious payment to “restore order” in Ogoniland, a mere ten days after the shooting of unarmed protestors outside Shell's regional headquarters in Port Harcourt.

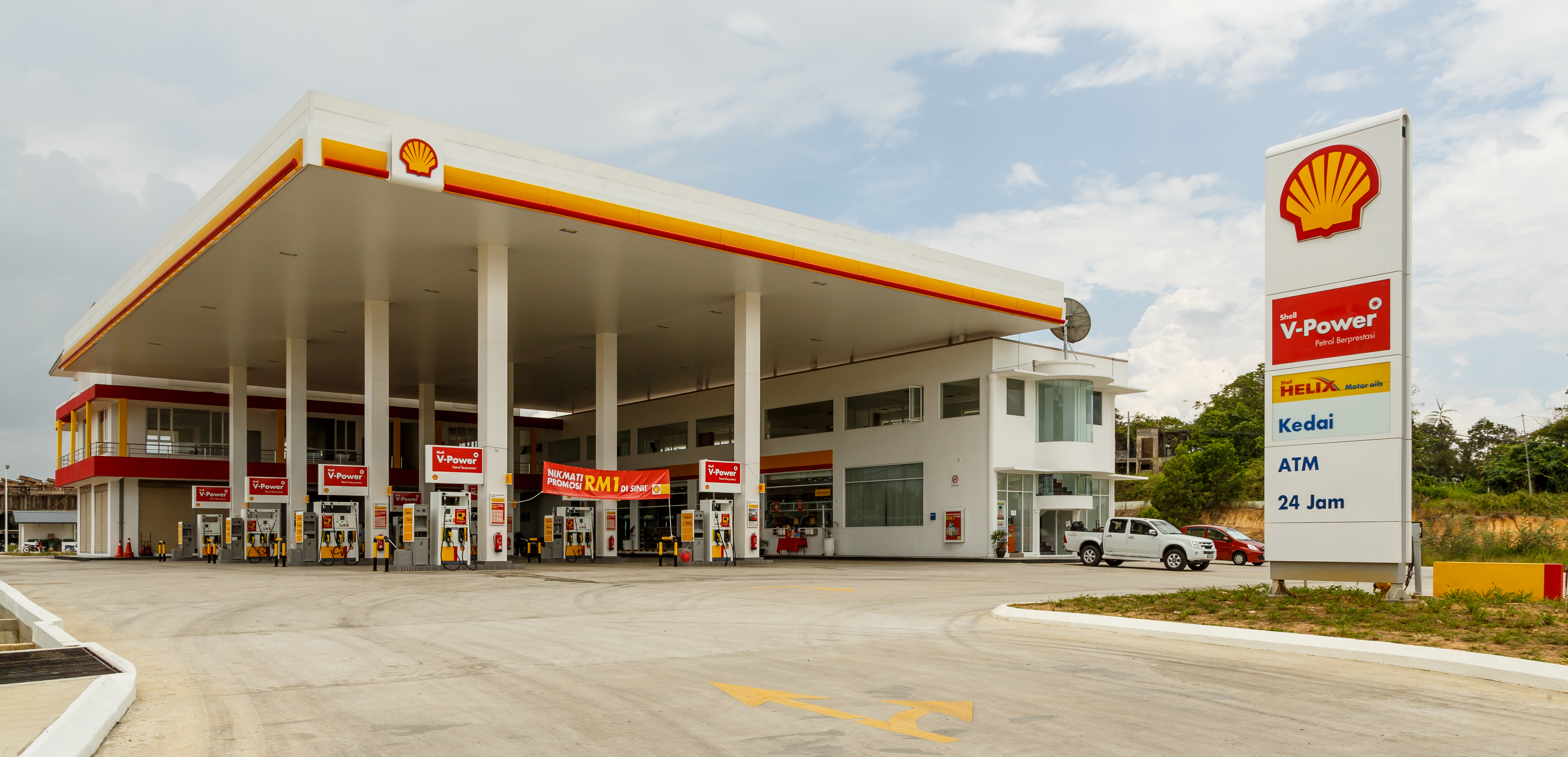
A Shell gasoline station in Sabah, Malaysia

Shell's oil extraction activities have been challenged in Court by various Nigerian communities. These communities sought to use the state and its judicial instruments to demand justice from the Shell corporation. Many communities have reported being disappointed by the legal process due to lengthy delays and the Court's perceived favoritism for the oil company.

=== Ejama-Ebubu court case ===
In 1970, an oil spill occurred at one of Shell's oil extraction facilities located in the Ejama-Ebubu community. The exact cause for the oil spill is disputed with some claiming that the spill was caused by a bomb exploding during the Nigeria-Biafra civil war. Others reject this claim, and instead believe Shell's equipment is responsible for the spill. Although the cause for the spill is disputed, it is agreed that roughly two million barrels of crude oil was spilled, affecting 631 acres, or 255 hectares, of surrounding land. Additionally, it is known that the spilt oil caught fire and burned for weeks. Chief Isaac Osaro Agbara, Oneh-eh Eta Ejaman XI, Emere Nkunna I of Eleme explained the fire by stating, "One early morning, there was a blow-out. Everywhere was dark, but there was fire at the same time. People were running helter-skelter....The fire burnt sand into coal tar. Most of our people had to flee the community to neighbouring towns and villages." In 2011, forty-one years after the spill, researchers have reported still being able to see oil when looking down into deep crevices and have found that eight centimeters of refined oil floats on groundwater in the region. The spilt oil is also said to have negative health consequences for members of the community, such as, causing respiratory problems because toxic gases are released. According to community members, SPDC had promised to clean up the affected land, but oil pollution remained. The long-lasting environmental impacts, the health consequences of the oil spill, and the unfulfilled promises to take action ultimately led the Ejama-Ebubu community to file a lawsuit against SPDC in 2001.

==== Court proceedings ====
Thirty years after the spill, in 2001, the Ejama-Ebubu community filed a lawsuit against Shell at the Federal High Court in Port Harcourt. The community asked the Court to require that Shell provide remedies in three ways. First, the Ejama-Ebubu community sought N5.4 billion in special damages. These special damages include direct value lost due to the oil spill, such as the cost of renewable crops, loss of income, health problems, and desecration of shrines. Second, the community sought N10 billion in general damages caused by the oil spill. These general damages were claimed due to general inconveniences caused by the oil spill such as polluted underground water, acid rain, and other difficulties faced by the community, like deprivation of education. Lastly, the community asked that Shell de-pollute the affected area and restore the environment to its pre-polluted state.

Although the lawsuit was initiated in 2001, a decision was not issued until 5 July 2010 by Justice Ibrahim Buba. The community's counsel, Emmanuel Asido Esq., explained that the case had been heard by two other judges before being presented to Justice Buba, resulting in a significant time delay. Justice Buba ruled in favor of the community, requiring Shell to pay N15.4 billion in damages and restore the Ejama-Ebubu land to its pre-polluted state. Justice Buba also decided that the Ejama-Ebubu community was granted a 25% interest charge on the N15.4 billion.

Following this ruling, SPDC appealed the judgement in 2010 and asked that any payment be suspended until after the appeal process. The Court agreed that payment could be postponed, but required that SPDC's bank, First Bank Plc, become a guarantor of the funds payable to the Ejama-Ebubu community. The Bank agreed to become Shell's guarantor and volunteered to "guarantee to pay to the respondents [the community] the judgment sums only if the aforesaid appeal to the Court of Appeal fails and the appellants [SPDC] become liable in law to pay the judgment sums therein."

In 2013, the Ejama-Ebubu community filed an objection to Shell's appeal because the oil company had not paid the correct filing fees. The Court upheld the community's objection and rejected SPDC's appeal. In response to this objection, SPDC appealed to the Supreme Court of Nigeria.

In 2016, the Supreme Court of Nigeria overturned the Court of Appeal's decision to reject the appeal. Justice Ibrahim Muhammad of the Supreme Court decided that Shell was allowed to appeal the initial 2010 judgement and ruled that the Court of Appeals must hear the case. The following year, in 2017, the Court of Appeals at Port Harcourt ruled that SPDC needed to pay the Ejama-Ebubu community the damages plus interest. Accounting for the interest since the 2010 judgement of N15.4 billion, the oil company was now required to pay N122 billion. Since First Bank Plc's had accepted the responsibility as guarantor of payment if the appeal failed, the bank was then liable to pay N122 billion to the Ejama-Ebubu community. However, as of January 2019, Shell sought to continue the appeals process, and many people expect a continuation of the complex legal proceedings.

=== Iwherekhan court case ===
According to Shell, it is common that when oil is brought to the Earth's surface, gas is produced as well. This gas is seen as an unwanted by-product and consequently, burned off in a process known as gas flaring. Many subsistence farm lands are located near the gas flaring station, and local community members have argued that the flaring activities contribute to environmental and health problems. In 2005, an Iwherekhan community member filed a lawsuit against SPDC in an attempt to shut down the gas flaring facility.

==== Court proceedings ====
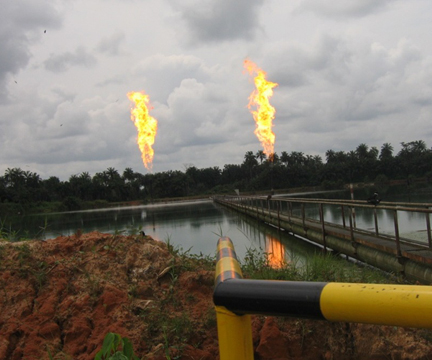
Gas flare in the Niger Delta

In July 2005, Jonah Gbemre, an Iwherekhan community member, filed a lawsuit against Shell to try to end gas flaring. Gbemre and the community argued that the extraction of oil and the technique of gas flaring results in a polluted environment and unhealthy living space. One activist in the region stated, "My community, Iwhrekan, is one out of the many of such host communities that have suffered from decades of gas flaring by IOCs [International Oil Company]. The million tons of carbon dioxide and methane released into the atmosphere every year, as a result of gas flaring, have obviously polluted the air we breathe in this part of the world." On 14 November 2005, the Federal High Court in Nigeria ruled in favor of the Iwherekhan community and declared that gas flaring was illegal. Furthermore, the court determined that gas flaring constituted a violation of the Iwherekhan community members' right to life and dignity.

SPDC appealed the ruling, and despite the court's order to stop gas flaring activities, it was reported that Shell continued to operate the gas flaring station in the Iwherekhan community. In response to SPDC's continued activities, on 16 December 2005, Gbemre and the Iwherekhan community filed contempt of court documents. However, SPDC argued that it was not in contempt of court since the oil company was still appealing the ruling. In April 2006, the Nigerian Supreme Court ordered that the oil company end all flaring by April 2007. However, as of 2015, gas flaring in the Iwherekhan community has continued, even though Shell announced that between 2002 and 2015 the volume of gas burned through gas flaring in Nigeria had been reduced by 85%.

=== Bodo community settlement case ===
In 2008, two oil spills occurred in the Bodo community. An investigation team was sent to determine the cause of the oil spill. Upon learning that operational failures of the pipelines caused the oil spills, Shell accepted responsibility. SPDC stated that the spills "were deeply regrettable operational accidents, and as in all cases of operational spills SPDC acknowledged responsibility to pay compensation as required by Nigerian law." The oil company and the community were reportedly "in and out of" negotiations from 2009 to 2015, until finally an agreement suitable to both sides was crafted.

==== Settlement negotiations ====
Two oil spills in the Bodo community negatively impacted the region's farmland and fisheries, harming the livelihood of the Bodo community members. SPDC initially responded to the oil spills in 2009 by offering food supplies to affected community members. This offer was rejected by Bodo chiefs, and SPDC then offered twice as much in food supplies. In 2011, members of the Bodo community brought claims against SPDC for environmental pollution. The environment pollution was significant for the Bodo community because the oil spilled into Bodo Creek, an important water supply for the community members who were mostly subsistence farmers and fishers. Following this lawsuit, Shell and the Bodo community more actively engaged in negotiation efforts, but the process was continuously interrupted by competing interests. The community argued that Shell was not offering enough compensation, while SPDC argued that the expectation of the community was too high and disproportionate to Nigerian standards. Finally, in 2015, Shell announced a £55 million settlement agreement. The oil company stated "we have now reached a settlement agreeable to ourselves and the community." The clean up is currently being undertaken by the internationally recognized Bodo Mediation Initiative (BMI).

=== Ogale class action lawsuit ===
A new suit has been filed by farmers from the Ogale region of Nigeria against Shell in the High Court of London. More than 2,000 people have joined the suits with local churches and schools joining the case to force the company to clean up the environmental destruction caused by oil spills.

Lawyers representing 13,000 locals claim Shell and its subsidiary "failed to take basic steps" to stop the oil theft and other activity that caused the spill, and that there has "barely" been a clean-up. Full trial proceedings are set to commence in 2026.

The suit comes as Shell declared that it made over $30bn in profit from the first three quarters of 2022. Shell says that the spills in questions occurred more than five years ago and were often caused by organized gangs, who caused the spills when illegally siphoning oil from the pipelines.
