= Oloibiri =

Community in Ogbia, Bayelsa, Nigeria

Coordinates: 4°40′02″N 6°18′30″E

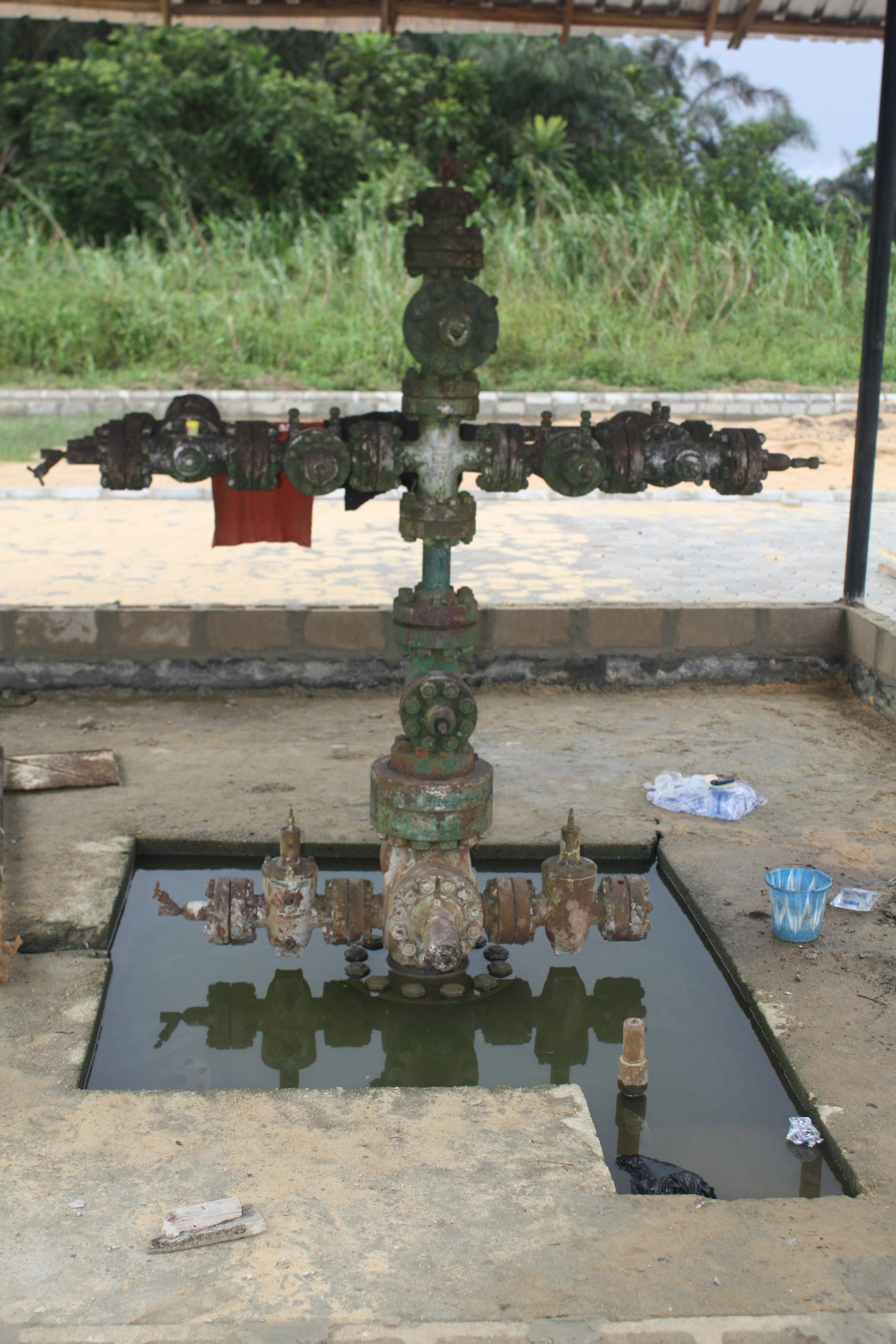

Oloibiri is a small community in Ogbia LGA located in Bayelsa State, in the eastern Niger Delta region of Nigeria. The inhabitants of Oloibiri community are mainly fishermen and farmers. It is the first place that oil was discovered in Nigeria.

Oloibiri is a historic town to the oil and gas industry in Nigeria. Nigeria's first commercial oil discovery in Oloibiri town by Shell Darcy on January 15, 1956.

The discovery of oil in Oloibiri hasn't helped most Nigerians and only has led to destruction of the environment and the way of life of indigenous people of the Niger Delta. And with an initial production of 5,000 barrels of oil per day (which would later become as much as 2,000,000), Nigeria became the 6th largest oil producer on the chart of the Organisation of petroleum Exporting Countries OPEC.

Oloibiri well was the first commercial oil well in Nigeria. Oloibiri Oilfield was the first commercial oil field in Nigeria as well as West Africa. Nigeria exported its first crude oil in February 1958 from the Oloibiri oil field. Nigeria's first crude oil export came from Oloibiri field in February 1958. Nigeria's first crude oil pipeline was laid from Oloibiri oil field to Port Harcourt on the Bonny River (Bonny Export Terminal).

== Current state ==
The town of Oloibiri is the 'birthplace' of oil in Nigeria.

Since 1946 when then Shell-BP began test oil drilling at Oloibiri and subsequently began large scale operations in 1948 which reached its peak in 1968 minor oil spill pollution occurred repeatedly and even a few larger oil spills at the facility that polluted the direct area heavily that have caused lasting environmental issues in the Niger Delta

Oloibiri is somewhat developed, has small local hospitals, various schools, and a court, local governance buildings. Energy is created by a small solar power farm. Most of the roads are concrete, some are hardened dirt roads.

Peak drilling at around the Nigerian Delta has changed drastically over the years, due to advancements in drilling techniques the oil can simply be gathered at centralized wells that are drilled much deeper. Thus there is no longer a need to have wells all over the Nigerian Delta rivers, this has helped in drasticly reducing small oil spills. Oloibiri suffered job losses because of these changes as the wells near Oloibiri were shut down and capped.

There is still some localized environmental issues around the old oil wells at Oloibiri island visible from satellite images.
