= Odual language =

Central Delta language spoken in Nigeria

Odual
- Native to: Nigeria
- Region: Bayelsa State, Rivers State
- Ethnicity: Ijaw
- Native speakers: (18,000 cited 1989)
- Language family: Niger–Congo?: Atlantic–Congo; Benue–Congo; Ijoid; Central Delta; Ijaw languages; Odual

Language codes
- ISO 639-3: odu
- Glottolog: odua1238

Odual (Onu Odual) is a poorly studied Ijoid Central Delta language spoken by the Odual community in the Abua–Odual Local Government Area of Rivers State and Ogbia LGA of Bayelsa State, Nigeria. The Odual language has its roots in the Abua language, making them very similar. The major differences between the Abua language and the Odual is intonation, with the Oduals having a more rising intonation than the Abuans. Subsequently, most Oduals would understand Abuans when they speak but only a few Abuans (especially those who grew up close to Odual communities) would understand Oduals.

Regardless of this minor difference, the Oduals and Abuans live amongst each other and do not see each other as foreigners.

== Distribution ==
The Adibaam group comprises Adada, Emelego, Ogboloma and Okolomade; the Arughunya group comprises Ekunuga, Anyu, Emaarikpoko, Obedum and Odau (cf. Gardner et al. 1974 and Comson 1987).

Comson (1987: viii), citing the Rivers State of Nigeria Ministry of Economic Development and planning (1983), puts the population of Odual at 30,028.

The Odual clan is bounded in the east by the Abua villages of Ogbema, Arukwo, Ogbogolo, in the west by Oloibiri, Amurukeni in Ogbia (in Bayelsa State of Nigeria), in the north by Oruma, Ibelebiri, Kolo (also in Ogbia), and in the south by Nembe town of Oluasiri, Bassambiri, Ekpoma, Ogbolomabiri (also in Bayelsa State of Nigeria), etc. (Comson 1987:vii).

Odual is not spoken by all the communities that share boundary with the Odual clan. The communities that do not speak Odual are those that belong to the Abureni group. These communities speak Abureni, a Delta Cross language that is coordinate with Odual. In addition to Odual, some speakers in the Adibaam group also understand and speak Abuan, Abureni, Nembe, Kalabari and Ogbia (Kolo Creek). Some speakers in the Arughunya group also understand and speak Ogbia, Nembe and Kalabari. Speakers of the Odual language call themselves Ikpetemonu Odual, meaning "speakers of the Odual language". A speaker of this language is called Okpetemonu Odual.

Odual is coordinate with other Central Delta languages such as Abuan, Abureni, Obulom, Ogbia, Ogbogolo and Ogbronuagum (Faraclas 1989:381). These languages with which Odual is coordinate are also spoken in Rivers State of Nigeria, except Ogbia, which is spoken in Bayelsa State of Nigeria. There is a dearth of scholarly linguistic literature on these languages in comparison with languages such as Degema, Kalabari, Obolo and Izon. The major linguistic studies on Odual are Comson (1987), Madumere (2006) and Kari (2009). Other materials on Odual include Gardner et al. (1974), Gardner (1975) and A history of Iduma From Ancient Times (2016) Kari (2007a, 2007b).

== Writing system ==
Odual alphabet
a	aa	ạ	ạa	b	ḅ	bh	d	ḍ	e
ee	ẹ	ẹe	f	g	gb	gh	i	ii	ị
ịi	j	k	kp	l	m	n	nw	ny	o
oo	õ	õõ	ọ	ọo	p	r	s	t	u
uu	ụ	ụu	v	w	y	z			
