= Eleme =

Eleme may refer to:

- Eleme, Ghana, a town
- Eleme, Mali, a town
- Eleme, Nigeria, a Local Government Area
- Eleme people, an ethnic group in Rivers State, Nigeria
- Eleme language, a language spoken by the Eleme people
- Ele.me, a Chinese online food delivery platform
