= Okerewa =

Town in Nigeria

- Town
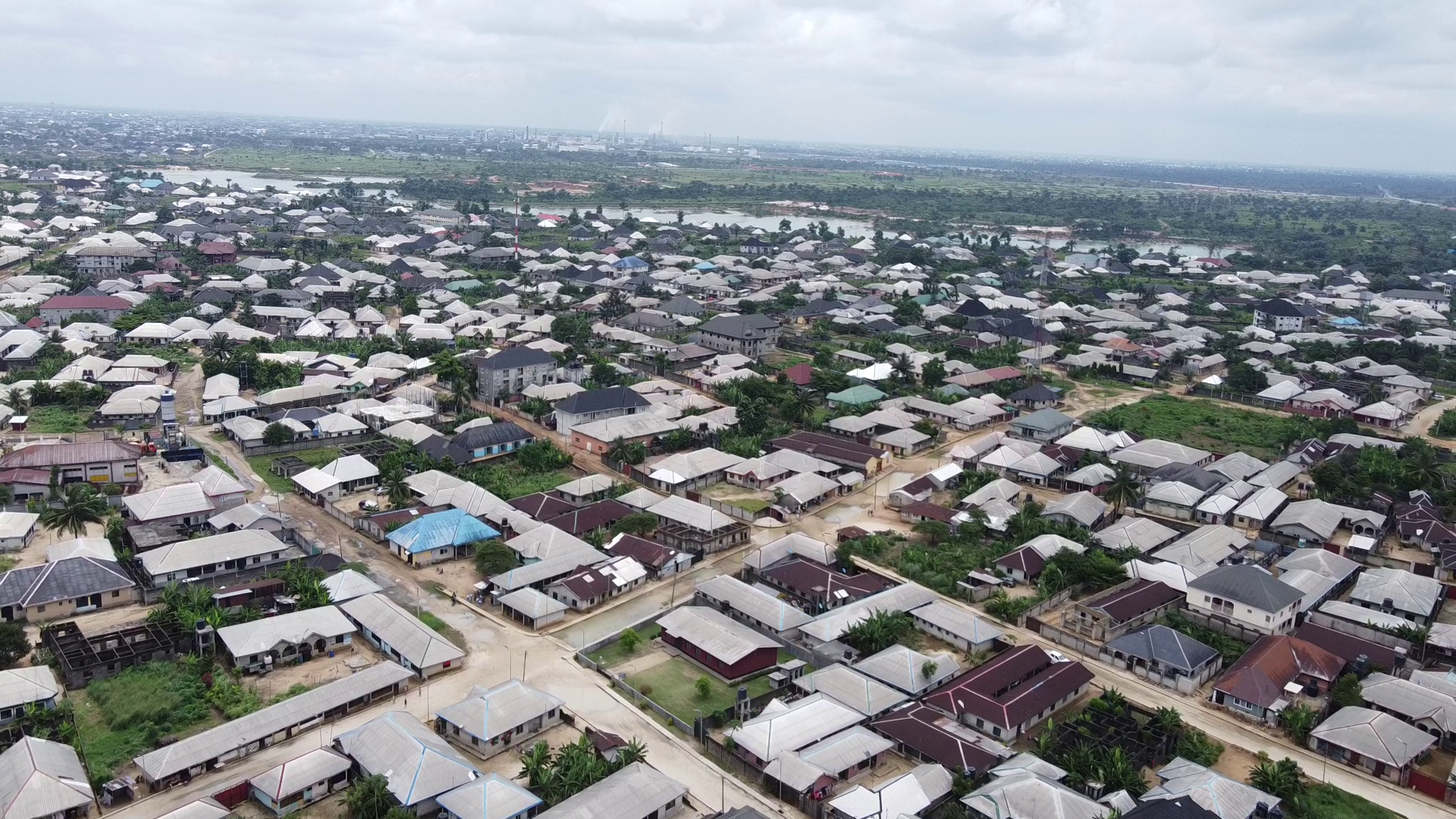

- Location within Nigeria
- Coordinates: 4.7940°N 7.1180°E
- Country: Nigeria
- State: Rivers State
- LGA: Eleme

Government
  - Paramount ruler: Eteeh Osaro Elechi (since 2014)
  - OCDI Chairman: Benjamin Ngokanya

Population (2024)
  - Total: 10,000
- Time zone: UTC+1 (WAT)

Okerewa is a town in Nigeria located in Eleme, Rivers State. It comprises four major communities: Mgbimbgii, Aarah, Eteeh, and Ngo-Osaroego, which are historically believed to have originated from the four founding brothers of the town. Okerewa is dominated by Eleme people and the current ruler is Eteeh Osaro Elechi.

== History ==
Okerewa could be historically traced back to the union of four brothers, each founding one of the town's major communities. In the 1970s, many farmlands in Okerewa and other towns in return for 7.5% share of dividends, were acquired by the Nigerian government to establish Eleme Petrochemical. The company was acquired by Indorama Corporation in 2006. The management of the dividends led to internal conflict and legal battles from 2012 to 2018. In 2019, a resolution was reached, leading to the creation of Okerewa Community Development Initiative (OCDI), a body that manages community's share of the dividends. It is led by Benjamin Ngokanya.

== Geography ==
Okerewa is situated within the Niger Delta region, whose wealth and resources has influenced the economy and environmental challenges, especially in oil and gas operations.

In 2024, following an oil spill, the Rivers State Assembly ordered Shell to commence a clean up of affected communities. The incident prompted concerns about environmental governance and the responsibilities of oil companies operating in the region. The cleanup process is being monitored by local authorities to ensure compliance with environmental standards.

== Economy ==
The local economy was traditionally based on agriculture, but developments by the Okerewa Community Development Initiative (OCDI) and the Okerewa Cooperative have established the business and investment arm of the community. The Okerewa Smart Farm, a recent addition, integrates modern farming techniques and provides training to community members. The Okerewa Cooperative offers microloans and facilitates small business growth through programs like equipment rentals and point-of-sale (POS) services.

== Government and administration ==
The Okerewa Community is governed through a traditional structure led by the Paramount Ruler, Chief Amb. Eteeh Osaro Elechi, who collaborates with the Okerewa Community Development Initiative (OCDI) and the Council of Chiefs and Elders of Okerewa. Before the 1990s, the community was led by its oldest male indigiene, until the community was officially recognized by the Eleme traditional institution and was restructured to create administrative roles.

In 2017, the current OCDI Chairman, Hon. Benjamin Ngokanya, led a protest against Indorama Eleme Petrochemicals, citing alleged irregularities in the payment of community shares. The protest underscored local dissatisfaction with the company's distribution practices and reflected broader tensions surrounding resource allocation and corporate responsibility in the area.

The OCDI was formed in 2019 and is responsible for managing community resources, particularly the community’s 7.5% dividend from Indorama Eleme Petrochemicals. The community also has a Cooperative Society known as Okerewa Community Peaceful Multipurpose Cooperative Society Limited, which was registered in 2021 and is in charge of giving soft loans to individuals and SMEs, third party project financing, rental of equipment for events, thrift/point-of-sale (POS) services, real estate, agriculture, and asset management. The cooperative collaborates with National Foundations like the Partners In the Niger Delta (PIND) Foundation, receiving funds to benefit the community.

== Infrastructure ==
In recent years, infrastructure projects such as road construction, street lighting, and a health center have been undertaken in Okerewa. A 10-year agreement with Chanita Construction Company has led to the phased construction of internal roads. Additionally, the OCDI in collaboration with CAD Consulting Limited, has facilitated the establishment of the Okerewa Digital Smart Farm, a multi-unit agricultural ecosystem project which consists of various livestock and crop units, offering agricultural modernization and community training.

Indorama Eleme Petrochemicals has also contributed to the local community through various social responsibility initiatives. These include supporting education, healthcare infrastructure, and local development projects. A Memorandum of Understanding was reached between Indorama Eleme Petrochemicals and the host communities to protect the rights of both parties between the host communities of Indorama Eleme Petrochemicals Complex and Indorama Nigeria.

== Education ==
The OCDI implemented various educational programs, including local and foreign scholarships for both undergraduate and postgraduate students. Community members have undergone skill acquisition programs, including computer training and welding, preparing them to participate in the Okerewa Digital Smart Farm initiative.
