= Eleme/Tai/Oyigbo federal constituency =

Federal constituency of the Nigerian house of representatives

Eleme/Tai/Oyigbo
- constituency for the House of Representatives
- District: Rivers South East
- State: Rivers, Nigeria

Current constituency
- Party: PDP
- Member: Felix Nwaeke

Eleme/Tai/Oyigbo is a federal constituency of the house of representatives in Rivers State, Nigeria. It covers Eleme, Tai and Oyigbo local government areas. Eleme/Tai/Oyigbo is represented by Felix Nwaeke of the People's Democratic Party of Nigeria.

== Communities ==
=== Eleme ===
- Agbonchia
- Akpajo
- Alesa
- Aleto
- Alode
- Ebubu
- Ekporo
- Eteo
- Ogale
- Onne

=== Tai ===
- Ban-Ogoi
- Sakpenwa

=== Oyigbo ===
- Afam
- Afam Nta
- Asa
- Oyigbo
