= Khana language =

Ogoni language of Nigeria

Khana
- Ogoni
- Native to: Nigeria
- Region: Khana, Rivers State
- Native speakers: 434,000 (2020)
- Language family: Niger–Congo?: Atlantic–Congo; Benue–Congo; Cross River; Ogoni; East Ogoni; Khana

Language codes
- ISO 639-3: ogo
- Glottolog: khan1278

Khana (audio) (Kana), or Ogoni, is the prestige variety of the Ogoni languages of Rivers State, Nigeria. It is the lingua franca of speakers of the East Ogoni languages. It is the most dominant of the 5 Ogoni languages Khana, Tee, Gokana, Eleme, Baan spoken in southern part of Rivers State.

== Phonology ==
The phonology of Khana is as follows:

=== Consonants ===
		Labial	Alveolar	Palatal	Velar		Labial- velar	Glottal
		Labial	Alveolar	Palatal	plain	lab.	Labial- velar	Glottal
Nasal		m	n	ɲ	ŋ	ŋʷ		
Plosive	voiceless	p	t		k	kʷ	k͡p	ʔ
Plosive	voiced	b	d		ɡ	ɡʷ	ɡ͡b	
Affricate				d͡ʒ				
Fricative	voiceless	f	s					h
Fricative	voiced	β	z		ɣ			
Trill			r					
Approximant			l	j			w	

=== Vowels ===
	Front	Central	Back
Close	i, ĩ		u, ũ
Close-mid	e		o
Open-mid	ɛ, ɛ̃		ɔ, ɔ̃
Open		a, ã	
