= Oduoha-Emohua =

Nigerian village / town

Oduoha-Emohua Odu-Woha Oduoha
- Village and town
- Location in Nigeria
- Coordinates: 4°53′0″N 6°52′0″E
- Country: Nigeria
- State: Rivers State

Government
  - Type: Monarchy
- Time zone: UTC+1 (WAT)

Oduoha-Emuoha is one of the eight villages that make up Emohua Town of Emohua Local Government Area in Rivers State, Nigeria.

== Name ==
Emohua Town is the headquarters of Emohua Local Government Area. Emohua Town itself consists of eight villages which. All the eight villages follow the same naming patterns of adding the suffix -Emohua

== Families ==
The Village is also divided into two groups referred to as families. They are: Alimini and Ogbodo. These family names are historical. Both Families are further divided into other sub families which produce the ruling council of the village.

== Rulership ==
Rulership in Oduoha is just the same with every Ikwerre villages. But then each of the sub-families grouped under the two main families produces a representative (usually the oldest in the family) as a member of the Ruling Council of the village usually headed by the paramount ruler who assumes title of His Royal Highness
