= Tai, Nigeria =

Tai
- LGA
- Interactive map of Tai
- Tai shown within Nigeria
- Coordinates: 4°43′0″N 7°18′0″E
- Country: Nigeria
- State: Rivers State
- Date created: 1996
- Seat: Saakpenwa

Government
  - Local Government Chairman: Hon. Matthew Nenubari Dike
  - Deputy Local Government Chairman: Caroline Amaawa (PDP)
  - Local Government Council: Ward 1: Christian Monday (PDP); Ward 2: Kumbe Susan (PDP); Ward 3: Dorkabari Best Ebere (PDP); Ward 4: Kenneth Levi (PDP); Ward 5: Prince Tamzor (PDP); Ward 6: David Tambeke Ngeh (PDP); Ward 7: Paul Ngbene Barigbue (PDP); Ward 8: Theophilus Otumba (PDP); Ward 9: Godknows Bira Ntorkere (PDP); Ward 10: Lagalo Mene Sam (PDP)

Area
  - Total: 159 km^{2} (61 sq mi)

Population (2006)
  - Total: 117,797
  - Density: 741/km^{2} (1,920/sq mi)
- Time zone: UTC+1 (CET/WAT)

Tai (audio) is a Local Government Area (LGA) of Rivers State in Nigeria. It covers an area of 159 km^{2} and at the 2006 Census it had a population of 117,797. It is part of the Eleme/Tai/Oyigbo federal constituency of the house or representatives and the Rivers South East district of the Nigerian Senate, represented by Barry Mpigi. Tai local government headquarters is situated at Sakpenwa. Christianity and traditionalism are widely practiced in the area and little Islamic religion In the April 2007 elections the Tai LGA recorded an implausible 99.6% turnout for the Governorship election. Celestine Omehia of the Rivers State People's Democratic Party was at first declared winner, but his election was later annulled and Rotimi Amaechi, also of the PDP, was declared governor. In February 2009, the Chairman of Tai Local Government Area was Barry Mpigi. and currently Hon. Dike Matthew Nenubari is the incumbent Chairman of Tai, who first served as care taker but was later elected as chairman in 2024 and currently serving, as at the time published

Most of the people are Ogoni, speaking the Tee and Baan languages. Communities include Ban-Ogoi, Bara-Ale, Bara-Alue, Barayira, Borobara (a central community), Botem, Bunu, Deeyor Kira, Gbam, Gbene-Ue, Horo, Kebara Kira, Korokoro (the seat of the Tai monarch), Koroma, Kpite, Nonwa Tai (Kebara), Nonwa Uedume, Norkpo, Sime and Ueken. Other communities include Kporghor and Gio.

Tai Local government area has two broad sections: the Tua Tua Kingdom and the Barasi Nonwa Kingdom,(Tai 1and Tai 2) both under the overall Tai kingdom headed by the Gbene Mene Tai. The primary occupation of the Tai people are farming, and fishing to a lesser degree. In September 2009, Samuel Nnee was the paramount ruler of the Kpite Community in Tai LGA.

There are many oil wells in the LGA, which is laced with pipelines, with most of the oil installations being operated by Shell Nigeria. However, the local community has seen little benefit from oil extraction, and infrastructure is poor. In the 1990s, the Movement for the Survival of the Ogoni People began a struggle against the degradation of their lands, which at times erupted into violence. In June 2001 an oil pipeline that passes through the Baraale community ruptured and spilled crude oil into nearby forests, farmlands and houses. There were delays in repair, and in October 2001 the spilled oil caught fire, causing extensive environmental damage. The region suffers from violence, kidnapping and arson.

== Climate/Geography ==
Tai experiences year-round heat and humidity due to its tropical location. At 27 degrees Celsius (81 degrees Fahrenheit), the average temperature is 27 degrees (or 81 degrees Fahrenheit), and the average humidity is 80%. Tai LGA has an approximate total area of 159 square kilometres with a mean temperature of 25 °C. There are several rivers and streams in the LGA, and the area's average humidity is reported to be 73%.

== Primary and Secondary Schools in Tai LGA ==
- Community Secondary school Kira, Tai
- Community Comprehensive Secondary School, Botem, Tai
- Community Comprehensive Secondary school Nonwa-Gam, Tai
- Community Secondary School Ban Ogoi, Tai
- Community Secondary School Bunu Tai
- Community Grammar School, Nowa, Tai
- Community Secondary School Koroma, Tai
- Tuatua Community Secondary School, Korokoro, Tai
