= Finima Nature Park =

Natural park in Bonny Island, Rivers State, Nigeria

- FNP
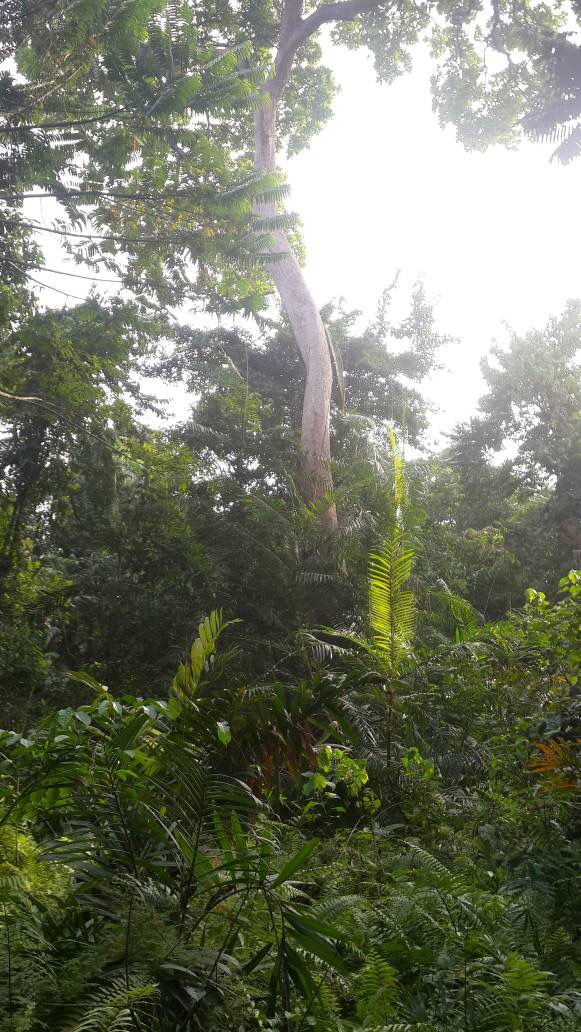
- Finima Nature Park
- Interactive map of Finima Nature Park
- Location: Bonny Island, Rivers State
- Coordinates: 4°23′43.73″N 7°10′34.75″E
- Area: 1,000 ha (3.9 mi^{2})
- Established: 1999
- Visitors: 1765 (Jan. 2017)
- Governing body: Niger Delta Wetlands Commission
- Website: finimanaturepark.com

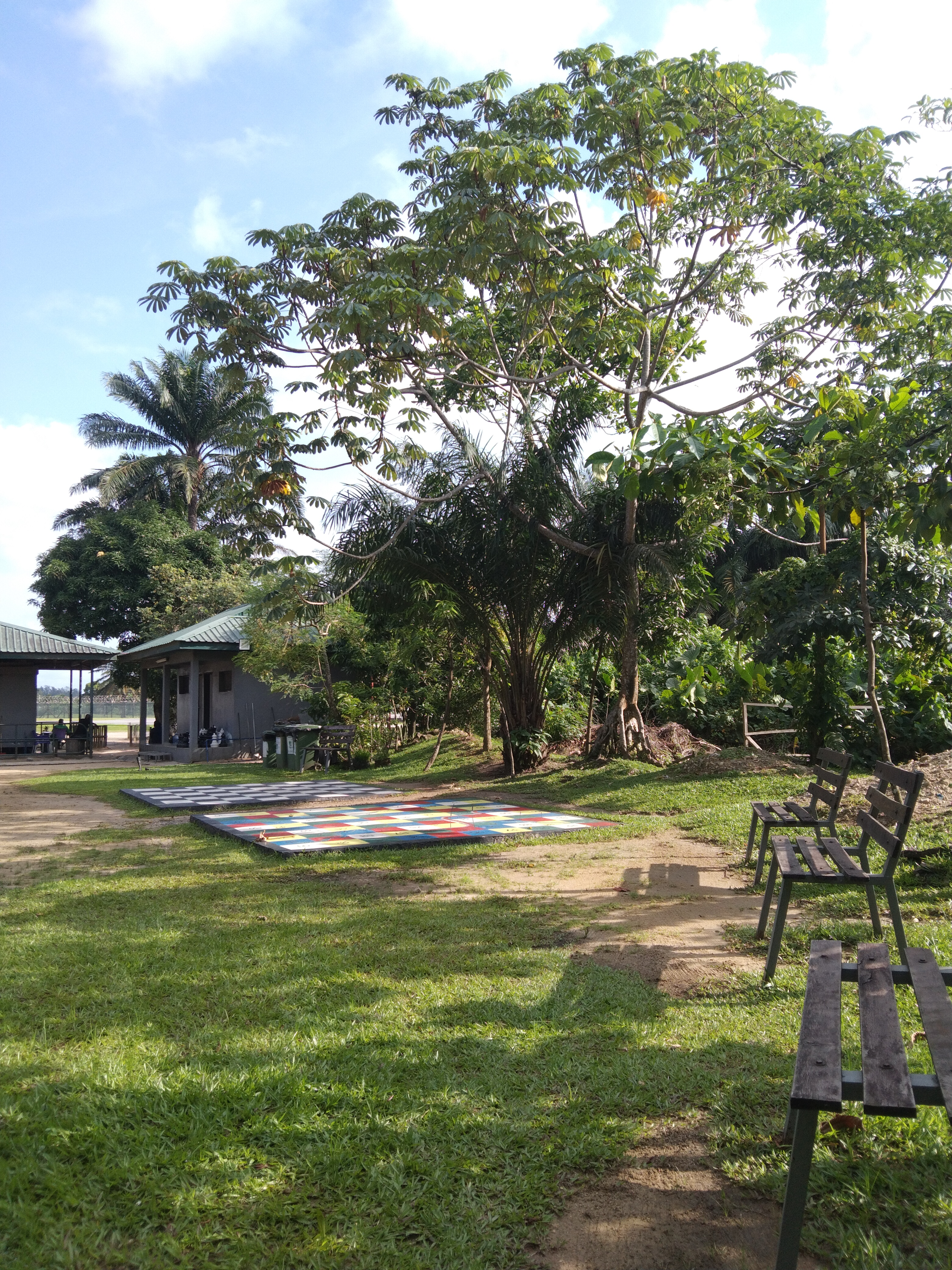

The Finima Nature Park is a natural park in Bonny Island, Rivers State, Nigeria covering an area of approximately 1,000 ha (3.9 sq mi). It was established by the Nigeria Liquefied Natural Gas Limited in 1999 with the aim of conserving nature and biodiversity in the region.

== Ecology ==
Finima's reserve area is covered by tropical rainforest and mangrove swamps, some parts contain sand with freshwater ponds and tall timber between the swamps and the beach.

=== Flora ===
Vegetation of the park has progressively developed into a high forest considering the form from which it began in 1999. There are two storey that can be distinguished from outside the forest, the emergent include Symphonia globulifera, Cleistopholis patens, Uapaca spp., Musanga cecropioides, Hallea ledermannii, Terminalia spp., Anthostema aubryanum, Tectona grandis and Elaeis guineensis. The understory is composed mainly of Calamus deeratus, Alchornea cordifolia, Monodora tenuifolia, Harungana madagascariensis, Strophanthus preussii, Rauvolfia vomitoria and Raphia spp.

The interior of the forest is very shady, and as a result a wide variety of shade tolerant forbs (e.g. Nephrolepis biserrata, Culcasia scandens, Laportea spp., Chromolaena odorata, Aframomum melegueta and Costus afer) and various sedges form thickets on the forest floor. By dry season, large cushion of litter cover the floor because of increase in abscission rate of some plants such as Musanga cecropioides, Hallea ledermannii, Calamus deeratus, Gmelina arborea, Raphia spp. and Elaeis guineensis.

=== Fauna ===
Finima Nature Park is home to some wildlife species of high conservation value, a variety of mammals, birds and reptiles including crocodiles, snakes and alligators. The site of the nature park is the natural habitat of salt water hippopotamuses. The area is protected by park rangers and hunting is prohibited.

List of animals

Mammals

- Mona monkey
- Pygmy hippopotamus

Reptiles and amphibians

- African rock python
- Ball python
- Black-necked spitting cobra
- Calabar python
- Crowned bullfrog
- Dwarf crocodile
- Emerald snake
- Forest cobra
- Forest hinge-back tortoise
- Forest vine snake
- Fire skink
- Gaboon viper
- Hallowell's toad
- Green bush viper
- Jameson's mamba
- Nile crocodile
- Ornate monitor
- Brown-flanked skink
- Red-headed rock agama
- Slender-snouted crocodile
- Square-marked toad
- West African black turtle
- Western clawed frog
- Western Forest File Snake
- West African night adder

Birds

- Black-crowned night heron
- Pied crow
- Black crake
- Black kite
- Blue-eared kingfisher
- Blue peacock
- Feral rock pigeon
- Great egret
- Grey heron
- Hooded vulture
- Little curlew
- Red-eyed dove
- Water thick-knee
- Western reef heron
- White-faced whistling duck
- Woodland kingfisher
