= Oil Mill Market =

Market in Portharcourt, Rivers state Nigeria

Coordinates: 4.8585°N 7.0647°E

Oil Mill Market is a market in Port Harcourt. The market is as old as Rivers State. This market is located in Rumukwurusi community which is in Obio Akpor Local Government Area in Rivers State. This market was given the name 'oil' since palm oil was traded at the market decades ago.

Oil Mill Market is situated at Eleme Junction, a landmark junction located in Aba Road, Port Harcourt, Rivers State. Oil Market has a special market day (Wednesday). On this very day every week, traders converge as early as possible in the morning to commence business activities.

== History ==
According to Eze B.A Worgu and Eze Chorlu VII in their article titled "HISTORY OF OIL MILL MARKET", Oil Mill Market otherwise known as Wednesday (or midweek) market came into existence soon after the Nigerian Civil War.

Eze B.A Worgu and Eze Chorly stated in their article that; historically, the present day Oil Mill Market sprang up as Nnempi Market whose major commodity was cassava (Akpakpuru) which came in both tuber and fermented forms because of the abundance of water in Mini Chid River. People from far and wide came to Nnempi Market to buy and sell Akpakpuru. The federal Government high way, constructed by Guffanti gave impetus to the quick expansion of the Nnempi Market. Around 1971-1977, the IKWU CHORLU MEETING gave great impetus to the development of the Nnempi Akpakpuru Market. In 1977, the market site was extended by Ikwu Chorlu Meeting with Elder Augustus Amadi as Chairman; other members of the meeting were Engr. B. A. Worgu, late Chief Abel Worgu, Mr. Josiah W. Worgu, Late Chief N.C.O. Nlerum and Austin W. Worgu. Following this exercise, the Nnempi Market gained attention among the broader Rumukwurusi people. The Nnempi Market then metamorphosed into the present day Oil Mill Market.
