= Ọchịchị language =

Extinct Cross River language of Nigeria, Africa

Ọchịchị
- Oʼchiʼchiʼ
- Native to: Nigeria
- Region: Rivers State
- Native speakers: few (2002)
- Language family: Niger–Congo?: Atlantic–Congo; Benue–Congo; Cross River; Central Delta; Ọchịchị

Language codes
- ISO 639-3: xoc
- Glottolog: ochi1235

Oʼchiʼchiʼ (Ọchịchị) is a presumably extinct Central Delta language of Nigeria. Its first published reference was in 2002. It was spoken by a few elders in the villages of Ikwewengwo and Umuebulu in the Etche Local Government Area of Rivers State.

Its existence was first discovered in a student project, and a small team from the University of Port Harcourt subsequently went out to attempt to collect further data on the language. The speakers refused to give any further information on the language, as they had almost entirely switched culturally to the Echie (or Échiè) dialect of Igbo and no longer wished to remember their old language.

From the few words collected, Ọchịchị appears to be related to Obulom, a Central Delta language in turn related to Abuan. However, Obulom itself is not well known.
