= Olaka Nwogu =

Nigerian politician

Member of the Senate of Nigeria for Rivers South East
- In office Mar 2015 – Dec 2015
- Preceded by: Magnus Abe
- Constituency: Rivers South East

Member of the House of Representatives
- In office 1999–2011
- Constituency: Tai–Eleme–Oyigbo

Chairman (Mayor) of Eleme

Personal details
- Born: 26 January 1965 (age 61) Rivers State, Nigeria
- Party: People's Democratic Party
- Education: University of Port Harcourt

Olaka Nwogu (born 26 January 1965) is a Nigerian Business Man, Civil Servant and Politician who was a member of the House of Representatives from 1999 until 2011 for People's Democratic Party. He represented the constituency of Tai–Eleme–Oyigbo. Prior to being elected to the House, he served as Mayor (chairman) of Eleme local government area in Rivers State. In March 2015, he contested for the seat of Senator in the National Assembly and won by 408,353 votes, defeating incumbent Sen. Magnus Abe of the All Progressives Congress, but later lost in the tribunal.

In addition to his political career, Nwogu has also ventured into business. He is currently the Chairman and CEO of Landmark Hotel in D-line and Hinterland Construction Company in Eleme.

== Education ==
Nwogu graduated with a bachelor's degree in Marketing from the University of Port Harcourt and later procured a master's degree in Business Administration from the institution.

== See also ==
- List of people from Rivers State
