= Akpajo =

Town in Rivers State

Akpajo is a town located within the Eleme Local Government Area of Rivers State, Nigeria. It is one of the ten major towns inhabited by the Eleme people, an ethnic group indigenous to the Niger Delta region.

== Geography and location ==
Akpajo is situated approximately 20 kilometres (12 miles) east of Port Harcourt, the capital city of Rivers State, Akpajo benefits from its proximity to urban amenities while maintaining its distinct community identity. The town is positioned along the East-West Road, one of the major highways in Rivers State. Its zip code is : 501101.
