= Kana language =

Kana language may refer to:

- Khana language (also known as Ogoni proper), the prestige variety of the Ogoni languages in Nigeria.
- Kana dialect (also known as Leyteño), a dialect of the Cebuano language of the Central Philippines.

== See also ==
- Kana, one of the scripts used for writing Japanese
