= Abua =

Coordinates: 4.9564022°N 6.6344177°E

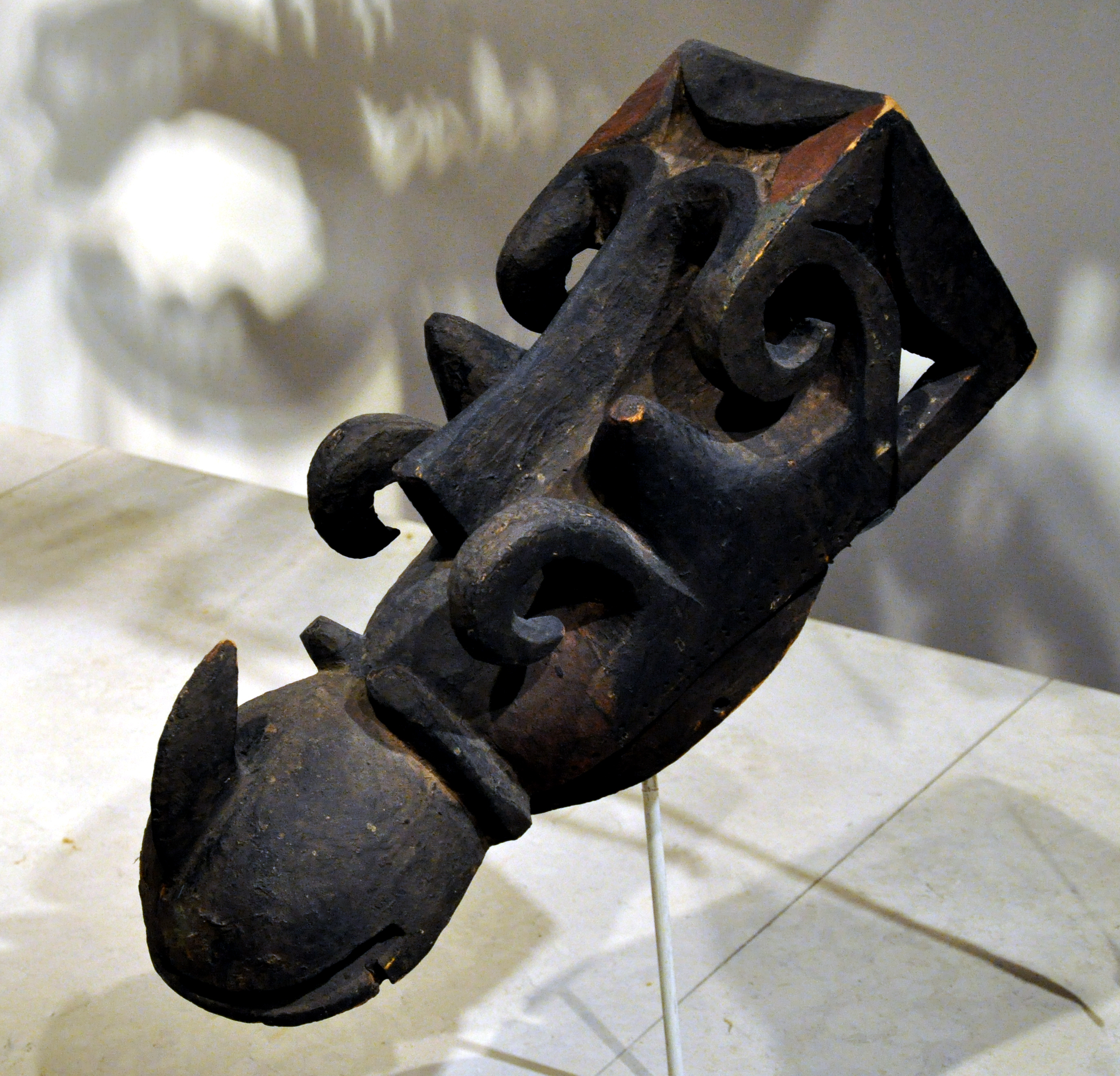
Mask (hippopotamus masquerade), Abua people, Nigeria, 19th century (British Museum, London)

Abua (Abuan) is a riverine kingdom which is currently located in the Abua–Odual LGA of Rivers State, Nigeria. It is located 10 miles away from Port Harcourt. The main occupation of resident of Abua includes: fishing, hunting and farming.

In Abua, the wet season is cold and overcast, while the drier season is mostly hot and sunny.

== List of communities and towns in Abua-Odual LGA ==
The following are the names of communities and Towns in Abua listed alphabetically.

- Agada 1
- Abual
- Agada 2
- Akani
- Omalem
- Omaraka
- Amorota
- Aminigboko
- Anyu
- Arukwo
- Dighriga
- Efebiri
- Egboama
- Egbolom
- Egbom
- Egunughan
- Ekunuga
- Elok
- Esidia-Elok
- Etuke-Elok
- Opiada-Elok
- Adokoni-Elok
- Akpasukubu-Elok
- Emago
- Emoh
- Emelesue
- Emelego
- Emesu
- Emilaghan
- Emirikpoko
- Emon-Ema Emabu
- Engeni
- Esala
- Esidia-Ogbema
- Forest-Reserve
- Iyak
- Kola-Ogbogbo
- Lower Orashi River
- Obarany
- Odaga
- Odedum
- Ogbema
- Ogbema Koku
- Ogbokuma
- Ogbologbo Plantain
- Ogboloma
- Oghora
- Okana
- Okoboh
- Okomade
- Okpeden
- Omokwa
- Opikiri
- Opu-Ogbogbo
- Oruama
- Otapha
- Otari
- Owerewere
- Plantains
- Serebia
