= Biseni =

Biseni may be,

- Biseni Forest
- Biseni language
