= Philip Obele =

Nigerian traditional ruler

Philip Osaro Obele
- Oneh Eh Eleme XI; DSSRS

King of Eleme
- Reign: 10 January 2019 – present
- Coronation: 10 July 2019
- Predecessor: Emere Samuel Oluka Ejire JP
- Born: 20 March 1958 (age 68); Eleme, Rivers, Nigeria
- Spouse: Blessing Obele (m. 1991)
- Religion: Christian

Philip Osaro Obele JP (born 1958) is a Nigerian traditional ruler and eleventh Oneh Eh Eleme (King of Eleme) of Eleme Kingdom since 2019.

== Education ==
Obele holds a bachelor's degree in education and political science from Bayero University Kano and NCE (National Certificate in Education) from the Rivers State College of Education (now Ignatius Ajuru University of Education).

== Personal life ==
Before his leadership role, Philip Obele worked as a teacher and administrator.

In August 2000, Philip Obele was installed as the paramount ruler of the Aleto clan. In 2008, he was elevated to Oneh Eh Nchia, a senior traditional position.

In July 2019, Philip Obele became the Onne Eh Eleme following the death of Samuel Oluka Ejire

He was chosen by the Eleme people and was recognized and given the staff of office by the then Governor of Rivers State, Nyesom Wike

== Reign ==
During his reign, there have been developments and challenges. The people of Eleme have experienced environmental pollution and oil spillage. He has taken steps such as forming clean up committees, meeting with heads of environmental organisations and fostering collaborations to address environmental degradation. On the 27th of May 2023 he was given the title of DSSRS by the then Governor Nyesom Wike in recognition of his service and contribution to the development of Rivers State.
