= Mini language =

Mini language may refer to:

- Domain-specific language, in computer languages
- Kujargé language (unclassified)
- Abureni language (Central Delta)
