= BVJ =

BVJ or bvj may refer to:

- Big Valley Jamboree, an annual country music festival held in Camrose, Alberta, Canada
- BVJ, the IATA code for Bovanenkovo Airport, Yamalo-Nenets Autonomous Okrug, Russia
- bvj, the ISO 639-3 code for Baan language, Nigeria
