= Tee language =

Ogoni language spoken in Nigeria

Tẹẹ
- Native to: Nigeria
- Region: Tai, Rivers State
- Native speakers: 310,000 (2006)
- Language family: Niger–Congo?: Atlantic–Congo; Benue–Congo; Cross River; Ogoni; East Ogoni; Tẹẹ

Language codes
- ISO 639-3: tkq
- Glottolog: teee1242

Tẹẹ ([tɛ̀ː]), or Tai, is an Ogoni language and the language of the Tai tribe of the Ogoni people of Rivers State, Nigeria. It is to a limited degree mutually intelligible with Khana, the main Ogoni language, but its speakers consider it to be a separate language.

== Phonology ==
The Tẹẹ sound system is typical of an Ogoni language and identical to that of Khana, with the exception of four or five voiceless sonorants not found in that language. The voiceless [w] is also found in other Ogoni languages, and voiceless [j] and [l] are also found in other languages of Nigeria.

=== Vowels ===
There are seven oral vowels, /i e ɛ a ɔ o u/, spelt (i e ẹ a ọ o u), and five nasal vowels, /ĩ ẽ ã õ ũ/ (spelt this way also). All may occur in long or short forms.

	Front		Central		Back	
	oral	nasal	oral	nasal	oral	nasal
Close	i	ĩ			u	ũ
Close-mid	e	ẽ			o	õ
Open-mid	ɛ				ɔ	
Open	a	ã				

=== Consonants ===
Consonants
		Bilabial	Alveolar		Palatal	Velar		Labial- velar
		Bilabial	median	lateral	Palatal	plain	lab.	Labial- velar
Plosive	voiceless	p	t			k	kʷ ⟨kw⟩	k͡p ⟨kp⟩
Plosive	voiced	b	d			ɡ	ɡʷ ⟨gw⟩	ɡ͡b ⟨gb⟩
Fricative	voiceless		s					
Fricative	voiced		z					
Nasal	voiceless	(m̥) ⟨hm⟩	n̥ ⟨hn⟩					
Nasal	voiced	m	n		ɲ ⟨ny⟩		ŋʷ ⟨nw⟩	
Approximant	voiceless			l̥ ⟨hl⟩	ȷ̊ ⟨hy⟩		w̥ ⟨hw⟩	
Approximant	voiced		ɹ ⟨r⟩	l	j ⟨y⟩		w	

A glottal stop [ʔ] appears before any otherwise vowel-initial stem. The alveolar consonants are apical.

Tẹẹ includes a rather unusual series of voiceless sonorants. The voiceless palatal /ȷ̊/ sounds rather like the voiceless palatal fricative [ç], but is not as noisy (that is, there is not much random-frequency noise in its sound spectrum). Similarly, /l̥/ is a voiceless approximant, not a voiceless fricative *[ɬ]. The voiceless bilabial nasal, /m̥/, is only known to occur in one word, /àm̥èː/ (an unidentified abdominal organ), and then only for some speakers. All of the voiceless sonorants are actually voiced during the second half of their enunciation. That is, /n̥/ is pronounced [n̥͡n] However, they are considerably shorter than their voiced homologues, and hence cannot be considered /hC/ sequences with an otherwise unattested consonant */h/.

=== Tone ===
Tẹẹ has three tones: high, mid and low.

- The high tone is indicated by an acute accent : á, ã́, é, ẹ́, ẽ́, í, ĩ́, ó, ọ́, ṍ, ú, ṹ;
- The low tone is indicated by a grave accent : à, ã̀, è, ẹ̀, ẽ̀, ì, ĩ̀, ò, ọ̀, õ̀, ù, ũ̀;
- The middle tone is indicated with no diacritic.
