= Eleme people =

Ethnic group of Rivers State, Nigeria

The Eleme people are one of the various groups of indigenous peoples that inhabit the Niger Delta region of South-South Nigeria.

== Location ==
The Eleme people live in ten major towns situated in Eleme Local Government Area, Rivers State, around 20 km east of Port Harcourt. They include: Akpajo, Aleto, Alesa, Alode, Agbonchia, Ogale, Ebubu, Ekporo, Eteo and Onne.

The total territory occupied by the Eleme people expands across approximately 140 square kilometres. Eleme is bounded in the north by Obio Akpor and Oyigbo, in the South by Okrika and Ogu Bolo, in the east by Tai and the West by Okrika and Port Harcourt.

== Ethnicity ==
In early colonial records Eleme is erroneously called Mbolli by neighboring Igbo people. The name came from the slave merchants of Arochuku who used the words "Mbolli Iche" which means "one country that is different" in the Igbo language to describe the people of Eleme. When the British colonising force entered Eleme around April 1898, their escorts introduced the people of Eleme to the British as Mbolli people.

Linguistically and ethnographically Eleme is a distinct ethnic group in Nigeria. The Eleme language is very distinct, though phonetically sounds like Ogoni Language, and this has raised the debate over whether or not Eleme is part of Ogoni. However, some Eleme people have affirmed that they are not part of Ogoni group. This is what is said from Ogoni Bill of Rights about whether or not Eleme was included as part of Ogoni.

"The inclusion of eleme and, to a lesser extent that of other Ogoni kingdoms, spoken by isolated and distinct clans on the western border as within the Ibibio stock is only proposed tentatively, and the former is chiefly included because of its history with Ogoni." Vol IX, p. 96

== Society ==
Eleme is traditionally an agricultural society, with farmers travelling out to farms situated around the villages, though the emergence of white-collar jobs and the industrial activities going on in modern-day Eleme tend to shift the paradigm.

Crops include yams, cassava, oil palm fruit, fluted pumpkin, and bitter-leaf. In traditional Eleme society, the crops cultivated were primarily used to sustain the family (subsistence farming), but each family also typically traded their excess crops at one of the town markets. Family members who were employed outside of the agricultural industry still farmed their land as a supplementary income. Farmworkers were usually women and hired labourers. A trend that has remained typical of the agricultural workforce in Eleme. The men sometimes helped their women with farming.

Eleme has two districts: the Nchia and the Odido, with same language but varying dialect. With inter-marriages and mixture, both dialects have gradually merged. Though those from the odido still speak the correct dialect. he eleme language means, Eleame (which means who wins)

=== Okon-Esaa festival ===
The Okon-Esaa festival, also known as the Yam Title Festival, is a principal tradition of the Eleme. Okon-Esaa was not celebrated between 1975 and 2019. A yam title holder in Eleme is held in higher regard and honor than other members of the community. Before white collar jobs and western education, yam title holders were the prominent figures in the community. The quantity of yams a man can plant and harvest is seen as a gauge of his strength and capability.

== Religion ==
Christianity is the dominant religion in southern Nigeria and is widespread in Eleme. The first church in Eleme was established in the historic town of Alode in the year 1910. The church is known as St Stephens Anglican Church, Alode parish. Traditional animist beliefs are also upheld by few of the population, including those who identify themselves as Christians. Marriages are traditionally polygamous and commonly exogamous with both other Ogoni and non-Ogoni groups across the Niger Delta. While the introduction of Christianity has undoubtedly led to a greater number of monogamous marriages in the region, polygamy and Christianity do not appear to be mutually exclusive in some families.

== Language ==
Eleme people speak the Eleme language. The language have been listed as one of the most endangered languages in Nigeria. This is because the vast majority of the people use English or Pidgin as their main means of communication. Many efforts have been made to encourage people to speak Eleme, including the publication of books in Eleme and the production of short comedy videos in Eleme known as Ekâ Eleme Ré Pé (Eleme language won't go into extinction).

== Industrial activity ==
Eleme area is heavily concentrated with heavy industry. Two major refineries, a foremost fertiliser plant in west Africa, a sea port, with so many other companies located in Onne such as Panalpina, Intels, Dangote Cement, P&O, Federal Lighter Terminal, Federal Ocean Terminal, WACT, etc. The privatised petrochemicals (EPCL) now Indorama Eleme Petrochemicals limited (IEPCL), the newly built Indorama Eleme Fertilizer Company Limited (IEFCL). There are two fertilizer companies in one LGA and others within the same complex.

== Socio-political system ==
The Eleme kingdom is ruled by a King known as Oneh Eh Eleme (Ruler of Eleme). Beneath him are the paramount rulers of each of the two major clans Oneh Eh Nchia (Ruler of Nchia) and Oneh Eh Odido (Ruler of Odido). Each clan is further divided into small communities (and then further into areas of the community). The traditional ruler of each community is known as Oneh Eh Eta (Owner of the Town). The current King of Eleme is His Royal Majesty Emere Dr. Philip Obele, Oneh Eh Eleme XI. The kingship is not hereditary, as it rotates from community to community.

== Economy ==
The Eleme are traditionally an agricultural society, with workers travelling out to farms situated around the villages. Crops include yam, cassava, palm-oil fruit, fluted pumpkin and bitter-leaf. Crops are primarily used to sustain each family, but each family also typically trades their excess crops at one of the town markets. Even where family members are employed outside of agriculture, they still farm their own land as a supplement income. Farm workers are usually women.

Following the discovery of oil in the Niger Delta in the 1958, oil refineries and fertiliser factories were built in the area, increasing the role of the industrial economy. The nearest oil refinery is within a mile of an Eleme village, and around 100 wells are thought to be in use throughout the Ogoni territory. Oil extraction has had significant political and environmental effects in the Niger Delta, with pollution from national industries based on Ogoni-land increasing acid rain and reducing soil, water and air qualities.

Ogoni-land has become an area of much political interest over the last 40 years since oil exploration is estimated to account for around 65 percent of Nigerian Government budgetary revenue and 95 percent of all foreign exchange earnings. Consequent high levels of migration into Eleme territory by other ethnic groups in Nigeria have made a sizeable impact on Eleme society. The presence of non-Elemes hoping to find work within the chemical industries has affected the social importance of Eleme cultural identity, raising concerns over the retention of Eleme cultural practices and language use. Hence the Eleme language has become one of the most endangered languages in Nigeria.

== Notable people ==
- His Royal Majesty Emere (Dr.) Philip Obele (The King of Eleme)
- Archbishop Ignatius Kattey (Anglican)
- Barrister Isaac Kamalu (Legal Practitioner / Politician)
- Senator Magnus Abe (Politician / Lawyer)
- Senator Olaka Nwogu (Politician)
- Pastor Simeon Job Okochi (Adventist)
- Archbishop Friday Nwator (TAPAC)
- Hon. Barr. Pat Ajudua Ph.D.

== Notes ==
12.https://adaaji.com/ascension-philip-o-obele/

- A. N. Osaroejii, (2005) Decision-making without focus : the bane of development in Nigeria
