= Emelego =

Town in Rivers State, Nigeria

- Town
- Interactive map of Emelego
- Coordinates: 4.821111°N 6.513333°E
- Country: Nigeria
- State: Rivers State
- LGA: Abua/Odual
- Postal code: 510102

Emelego is a town in Abua/Odua local government area of Rivers State, Nigeria. It is bordered by two villages: Okolo-Ade and Adada.

The paramount ruler of Emelego community is HRH (King) Temple McDonald Jama II, the Oola-ema XIX of Odual Kingdom. The current chairman of Emelego Community Development Committee (CDC) is Engr. Itotenaan Arugu.
