= Biseni Forest =

Freshwater swamp forest in the Niger Delta

Geography
- Location: Rivers State, Nigeria
- Area: 219 km^{2} (85 sq mi)

Administration
- Governing body: Rivers State Ministry of Agriculture

The Biseni Forest is a freshwater swamp forest located in the north west of Ahoada and the west of Upper Orashi Forest in the Taylor Creek floodplain of the Niger Delta. The forest has an area of 219 square kilometres (85 sq mi), a birdwatching site, with a relevant record of migratory and aquatic birds.

== Flora ==
Biseni Forest is a swampy woodland that may run dry during the dry season but quickly becomes a flooded forest due to heavy rainfall during the wet season. Raffia palms and some woody broadleaved species such as Symphonia globulifera and Ficus spp. are found here. There are also areas of tall grass swamps close to the river channels.
