= Onyesoh Alwell =

Nigerian politician

Allwell Onyesoh

Senator for Rivers east
- Incumbent
- Assumed office 13 June 2023

Personal details
- Born: Allwell Heacho Onyesoh; 26 December 1960 (age 65) Rivers State, Nigeria.
- Occupation: Politician

Allwell Heacho Onyesoh (born 26 December 1960) is a Nigerian politician from Rivers State, Nigeria. He is a senator of the Federal Republic of Nigeria, representing Rivers East Senatorial District. He served as former Commissioner for Education and later Commissioner for Sports under former Governor Peter Odili.

== Career ==
He was appointed in 2008 as Chairman of Senior Secondary School Management Board where he employed about thirteen thousand One Hundred and Fifty-Five, (13,155) graduate Teachers in Rivers state during the administration of Rt. Honourable Chibuike Rotimi Amaechi.

=== Senate Involvement ===
On February 25, 2023, Allwell Heacho Onyesoh was elected as the Senator representing Rivers East, making him the first person from Etche to be elected to the Senate of the Federal Republic of Nigeria under the platform of the People's Democratic Party (PDP). He succeeded Senator George Thompson Sekibo.

Upon joining the 10th National Assembly, Senator Onyesoh was appointed Chairman of the Senate Standing Committee on Federal Character and Inter-Governmental Affairs by the President of the Senate, Senator Godswill Akpabio. Additionally, he serves as Deputy Chairman of the Senate Committee on Petroleum Resources (Upstream) and is a member of several other Senate Committees, including Ethics, Privileges, and Public Petitions.
