= Gokana language =

Ogoni language of Nigeria

Gokana
- Native to: Nigeria
- Region: Gokana, Rivers State
- Native speakers: (100,000 cited 1989)
- Language family: Niger–Congo?: Atlantic–Congo; Benue–Congo; Cross River; Ogoni; East Ogoni; Gokana

Language codes
- ISO 639-3: gkn
- Glottolog: goka1239

Gokana (Gòkánà) (audio) is an Ogoni language spoken by some 130,000 people in Rivers State, Nigeria.

== Phonology ==
Gokana has been argued to lack syllables, a radical claim because syllables are traditionally considered to be universal. According to Hyman (1983), Gokana "does not organise its consonants and vowels into syllables." Hyman later amended his claim to say that "the syllable plays at best a minor role in the prosodic organisation of Gokana" and is perhaps not activated to express any generalisations in the language.

== Writing system ==
Gokana alphabet
Uppercase letters	A	B	D	E	Ẹ	F	G	Gb	Gy	I	K	Kp	Ky	L	M	N	Ng	Nv	Ny	O	Ọ	P	S	T	U	V	Z
Lowercase letters	a	b	d	e	ẹ	f	g	gb	gy	i	k	kp	ky	l	m	n	ng	nv	ny	o	ọ	p	s	t	u	v	z

Nasal vowels are indicated by a tilde and tones are indicated by an acute or grave accent:

- The high tone is indicated by an acute accent : á, ã́, é, ẹ́, ẽ́, í, ĩ́, ó, ọ́, ṍ, ú, ṹ, ḿ;
- The low tone is indicated by a grave accent : à, ã̀, è, ẹ̀, ẽ̀, ì, ĩ̀, ò, ọ̀, õ̀, ù, ũ̀, m̀;
- The middle tone is indicated with no diacritic.
