= Ogoni languages =

Cross River language group of Nigeria

Ogoni
- Kegboid
- Geographic distribution: SE Nigeria
- Ethnicity: Ogoni people
- Linguistic classification: Niger–Congo?: Atlantic–Congo; Benue–Congo; Cross River; Ogoni
- Subdivisions: East; West

Language codes
- Glottolog: ogon1240

The Ogoni languages, or Kegboid languages, are the five languages of the Ogoni people of Rivers State, Nigeria.

They fall into two clusters, East and West, with a limited degree of mutual intelligibility between members of each cluster. The Ogoni think of the cluster members as separate languages.

The classification of the Ogoni languages is as follows:

- East: Khana and Tẹẹ, with around 1,800,000 speakers between them, and Gokana, with about 250,000.
- West: Eleme, with about 90,000 speakers, and Baan, with around 50,500.

== Names and locations ==
Below is a list of language names, populations, and locations from Blench (2019).

Language	Branch	Dialects	Alternate spellings	Own name for language	Endonym(s)	Other names (location-based)	Other names for language	Exonym(s)	Speakers	Location(s)
Gokana	Kegboid								54,000 (1973 SIL)	Rivers State, Gokana–Tai–Eleme LGA
Khana	Kegboid	Yeghe, Nyokhana, Ken–Khana, Boúe, Kaa	Khana			Ogoni (ethnic and political term includes Gokana)			76,713 (1926 Talbot); 90,000 (SIL)	Rivers State, Khana/Oyigbo and Gokana–Tai–Eleme LGAs
Eleme	West								55,000 (1987 UBS)	Rivers State, Gokana–Tai–Eleme LGA
Tẹẹ	West		Tai	Tèẹ̀ ̣	Tèẹ̀ ̣				313,000 (2006)	Rivers State, Tèẹ̀ ̣Local Government Area (TALGA)
Baan		Ka-Ban, Kesari				Ban–Ogoi	Goi, Ogoi		Fewer than 5,000 (1990)	Rivers State, Gokana–Tai–Eleme LGA, Ban–Ogoi plus villages

== See also ==
- List of Proto-Ogoni reconstructions (Wiktionary)
