= Emohua Town =

Nigerian town

Emohua
- Town
- Location in Nigeria
- Coordinates: 4°53′0″N 6°52′0″E
- Country: Nigeria
- State: Rivers State
- LGA: Emohua
- Time zone: UTC+1 (WAT)

Emohua is a town and the headquarters of the Emohua Local Government Area of Rivers State, Nigeria. It comprises eight villages, namely:

- Oduoha
- Elibrada
- Isiodu
- Rumuakunde
- Rumuche
- Rumuohia
- Mgbueto
- Mgbuitanwo

The last six are collectively known as Rumuenyi.

The eight villages are usually written with the suffix -Emohua attached, for example Oduoha-Emohua.

== Climate ==
In Emuoha, the wet season is overcast and warm, the dry season is hot and mostly cloudy, and it is oppressive year round.
