= Ogbia language =

Central Delta language of Nigeria

Ogbia
- Ogbinya
- Native to: Nigeria
- Region: Bayelsa State, Rivers State
- Native speakers: 390,000 (2020)
- Language family: Niger–Congo?: Atlantic–Congo; Benue–Congo; Ijoid; Central Delta; Ogbia

Language codes
- ISO 639-3: ogb
- Glottolog: ogbi1239

Ogbia (AgBeya or Abaya) is a tribe under the larger Ijaw ethnic group the most spoken Central Delta language of Nigeria. It is spoken by over 200,000 people.

Blench (2019) lists varieties as Kolo (Agholo), Oloiḅiri, and Anyama. The Anyama variety remains unattested and has no data.

== Phonology ==
=== Consonants ===
		Bilabial	Labio- dental	Alveolar	Palatal	Velar	Labio- velar
Nasal		m		n	ɲ	ŋ	ŋʷ
Plosive/ Affricate	voiceless	p		t		k	k͡p
Plosive/ Affricate	voiced	b		d	d͡ʒ	ɡ	ɡ͡b
Plosive/ Affricate	implosive	ɓ		ɗ			
Fricative	voiceless		f	s			
Fricative	voiced	β	v	z		ɣ	
Trill				r			
Approximant				l	j		w

=== Vowels ===
	Front	Central	Back
High	i iː		u uː
Near-high	ɪ ɪː		ʊ ʊː
High-mid	e eː	ə əː	o oː
Low-mid	ɛ ɛː	ə əː	ɔ ɔː
Low		a aː	
