= Kugbo language =

Central Delta language of Nigeria

Kugbo
- Native to: Nigeria
- Region: Rivers State
- Native speakers: (2,000 cited 1973)
- Language family: Niger–Congo?: Atlantic–Congo; Benue–Congo; Cross River; Central Delta; Kugbo

Language codes
- ISO 639-3: kes
- Glottolog: kugb1241
- ELP: Kugbo

Kugbo is a Central Delta language of Nigeria.
