= Central Delta languages =

Branch of Cross River languages of Nigeria

Central Delta
- Geographic distribution: SE Nigeria
- Linguistic classification: Niger–Congo?: Atlantic–Congo; Benue–Congo; Cross River; Central Delta

Language codes
- Glottolog: cent2028

The Central Delta languages or Outer Cross are spoken in Rivers State, Bayelsa State and Nigeria. Outer cross together with Lower Cross and Upper Cross are a family of Cross River Languages. Ogbia is the most populous Outer Cross group, with over 390,000 speakers.

The languages are Abua–Odual, Ogbia, Kugbo, Abureni, Obulom, O’chi’chi’, Ogbogolo, Ogbronuagum.

== Names and locations ==
Below is a list of language names, populations, and locations from Blench (2019).

| Language | Cluster | Dialects | Alternate spellings | Own name for language | Endonym(s) | Other names (location-based) | Other names for language | Exonym(s) | Speakers | Location(s) | Notes |
|---|---|---|---|---|---|---|---|---|---|---|---|
| Abua | | Central Abuan, Ẹmughan, Ọtabha (Ọtapha), Okpeḍen | | Abuan | Abua | | | | 11,000 (1963): estimated 25,000 (Faraclas 1989) | Rivers State, Ahoada LGA | |
| Kolo cluster | Kolo | | | | | Ọgbia, Ogbinya | | | 100,000 (1987 UBS) | Rivers State, Brass LGA | |
| Kolo | Kolo | | Agholo | | | | | | | | |
| Oloiḅiri | Kolo | | | | | | | | | | |
| Anyama | Kolo | | | | | | | | | | no data |
| Obulom | | | Abuloma | | | | | | | Rivers State, Okrika LGA, Abuloma town | |
| Oḍual | | Arughaunya, Aḍibom | | Ọḍual | Oḍual | | | Saka | 8,400 (1963); 15,000 (1980 UBS) | Rivers State, Ahoada LGA | (F&J 1940) report 700 speakers, but in the 1970s, Barnwell (p.c.) found only 20 speakers living in a quarter of one town. The Odut are Mbembe speakers, and there is no separate language. |
| Ogbogolo | | | | | | | | | One town only | Rivers State, Ahoada LGA | |
| Ogbrọnuagụm | | | | | | Bukuma | Agum | | One town only, north of Buguma | Rivers State, Degema LGA | |
| Ọchịchị | | | | Ọchịchị | Ọchịchị | | | | A few speakers; moribund, since speakers have switched to Echie | Rivers State, Etche LGA, towns of Ikwerengwo and Umuebulu | |
| Kụgbọ | | | | | | | | | 2,000 (1973 SIL) | Rivers State, Brass LGA | |
| Abureni | | | | | Mini | | | Mini | 3 villages | Rivers State, Brass LGA | no data |
