= Barry Mpigi =

Nigerian politician (1961–2026)

Senator of the Federal Republic of Nigeria
- Constituency: Rivers State East Senatorial District

Personal details
- Born: Barry Barinada Mpigi; 21 /June/1961
- Died: 19 /February /2026
- Citizenship: Nigeria
- Occupation: Politician

Barry Barinada Mpigi (1961 – 19 February 2026) was a Nigerian politician from Rivers State, Nigeria. He served as a member of the Nigerian House of Representatives, representing the constituency of Eleme/Tai/Oyigbo.

== Life and career ==
Barry Barinada Mpigi was born on 21 June 1961 in Rivers State, Nigeria. He was the Senator representing the southeast Senatorial district of Rivers state in the 10th assembly and was member of the Nigerian 9th assembly during Buhari's second tenure. First elected in 2011 to the lower house, he was reelected to a second term in December 2016.

In 2019, he was elected as the Senator representing Rivers South East Senatorial District in the National Assembly under the platform of Peoples Democratic Party (Nigeria).

== Death ==
Mpigi died on 19 February 2026, at the age of 64.
