= DSSRS =

Distinguish Service Star of Rivers State

Awarded by Rivers State
- Type: Medal
- Awarded for: Services to Rivers State
- Status: Currently Constituted

The Distinguish Service Star of Rivers State (DSSRS) is the second highest constitutionally recognized honour in Rivers State, Nigeria, only shared with the Deputy Governor of Rivers State. It is given to individuals who have brought about lasting impact, positive change and achieved greatness in their respective fields. The authority for the title to be conferred on an individual is held only by the Governor of Rivers State.
