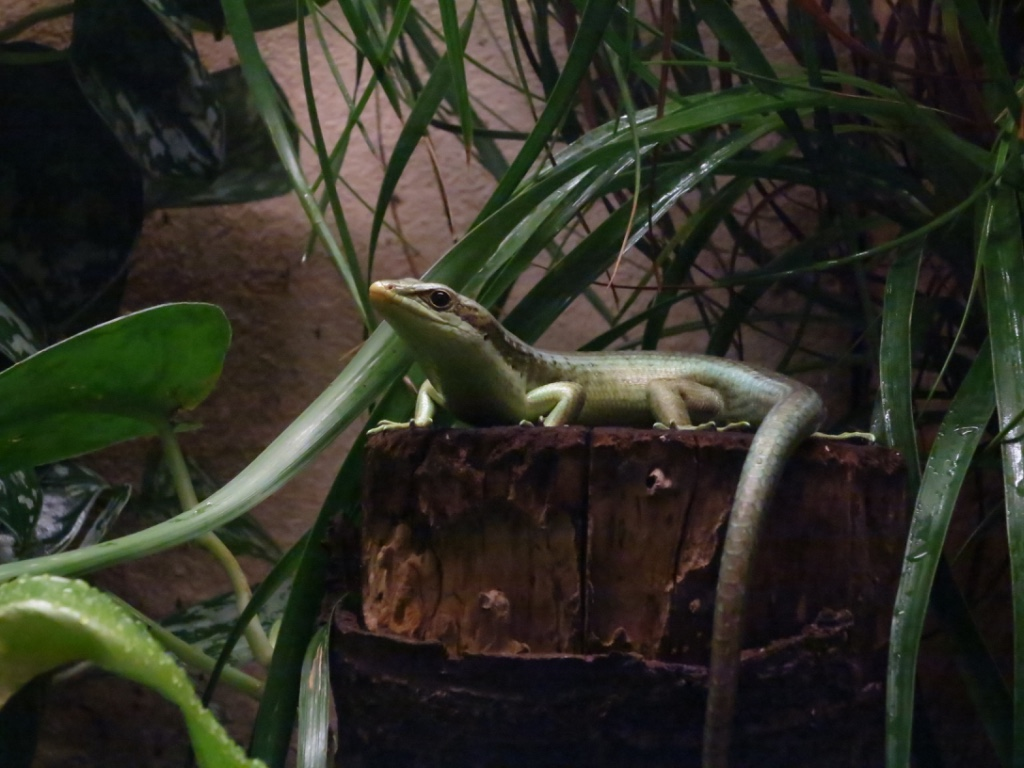
- Senegal mabuya at Antwerp Zoo

Scientific classification
- Domain: Eukaryota
- Kingdom: Animalia
- Phylum: Chordata
- Class: Reptilia
- Order: Squamata
- Family: Scincidae
- Genus: Trachylepis
- Species: T. affinis

Binomial name
- Trachylepis affinis (Gray, 1838)

Synonyms
- Mabuya affinis (Gray, 1838)

= Trachylepis affinis =

Species of lizard

Trachylepis affinis, the Senegal mabuya, is a species of skink found in Africa.
