= Abureni language =

Central ijaw language of Nigeria

Abureni
- Mini
- Native to: Nigeria
- Region: Bayelsa State and Rivers State
- Ethnicity: 4,000 (2006)
- Language family: Niger–Congo?: Atlantic–Congo; Benue–Congo; Cross River; Central Delta; Ijoid languages; Abureni

Language codes
- ISO 639-3: mgj
- Glottolog: abur1244

Abureni is an Ijoid language, a Central Delta language of Nigeria.
