= Emohua =

- LGA
- Interactive map of Emohua
- Location in Nigeria
- Coordinates: 4°53′0″N 6°52′0″E
- Country: Nigeria
- State: Rivers State
- Date created: 1991
- Seat: Emohua Town

Government
  - Local Government Chairman: Lloyd Chidi (PDP)
  - Deputy Local Government Chairman: Nyeche Edna (PDP)
  - Local Government Council: Ward 1: Promise Alison (PDP); Ward 2: Gift Enyi (PDP); Ward 3: Wodu Achinike (PDP); Ward 4: Obichukwu Chinda (PDP); Ward 5: Henry Eferebo (PDP); Ward 6: Love Nyenke (PDP); Ward 7: Emenike Wokoma (PDP); Ward 8: Bright Green (PDP); Ward 9: Sylvanus Ekwueme Dike (PDP); Ward 10: Clement Dimkpa (PDP); Ward 11: Beauty Ogbuji (PDP); Ward 12: Kingsley Oba (PDP); Ward 13: Andrew Uchendu (PDP); Ward 14: Success Okporo (PDP)

Area
  - Total: 831 km^{2} (321 sq mi)

Population (2006)
  - Total: 201,901
  - Density: 243/km^{2} (629/sq mi)
- Time zone: UTC+1 (WAT)
- Postal code: 511

Emohua is an oil rich Local Government Area in Rivers State, Nigeria. Its headquarters are in the town of Emohua. Emohua LGA is made up of so many towns and villages which includes: Omudioga, Egbeda, Ubimini, Elele-Alimini, Rumuji, Emohua, Ibaa, Obelle, Itu, Ndele, Odegu, Rumuekpe, Rumuodogo, Rumuewhor, Ovogo and so many others.

Emohua consists of fourteen political wards. Emohua LGA has fertile land that favours primary production such as farming. The presence of water bodies gives room for activities of primary production such as sand dredging and fishing. Furthermore, the presence, popularity and proximity of its markets favour secondary production such as oil milling, cassava processing rice processing, yam processing, meat processing (abattoir) and wood milling and poultry. With one of Rivers State University's satellite campus located in one of the communities

It has an area of 831 km^{2} (321 sq mi) and a population of 201,901 at the 2006 census.

The postal code of the area is 511.

== Climate/Geography ==
The entire area of Emohua LGA is 831 square kilometres or 321 square miles, and its average temperature is 25 degrees Celsius or 77 degrees Fahrenheit. In Emohua LGA, the average humidity is 83%, and the average wind speed is 10 km/h (6.2 mph). Numerous rivers and tributaries may be found in Emohua LGA.
