= Eleme, Mali =

Town in Mali

Eleme, also known as Elémé, is a town at 14.95°N 10.5°W in northern Kayes Region, Mali, north of Sambanara.
