= Ogbronuagum language =

Language of Nigeria

Ogbronuagum
- Bukuma
- Native to: Nigeria
- Region: Rivers State
- Native speakers: (12,000 cited 2000)
- Language family: Niger–Congo?: Atlantic–Congo; Benue–Congo; Cross River; Central Delta; Ogbronuagum

Language codes
- ISO 639-3: ogu
- Glottolog: ogbr1243

Ogbronuagum, also called Bukuma after a village in which it is spoken, is a Central Delta language of Nigeria.

Ogbronuagum is formed from the two words "Ogbronu" and "Agum", which would literally mean "the language of the people of Agum". The language is spoken by people called Bukuma in Rivers State of Nigeria. The town of Bukuma differs from the Buguma town. The towns are close and are both in Rivers State of Nigeria.
