= Ogbogolo language =

Central Delta language of Nigeria

Ogbogolo
- Native to: Nigeria
- Region: Rivers State
- Native speakers: (55,000 cited 1995)
- Language family: Niger–Congo?: Atlantic–Congo; Benue–Congo; Cross River; Central Delta; Ogbogolo

Language codes
- ISO 639-3: ogg
- Glottolog: ogbo1242

Ogbogolo is a Central Delta language of Nigeria.
