= Upper Orashi Forest Reserve =

Nigerian Nature Reserve

Upper Urashi Forest Reserve
- IUCN category VI (protected area with sustainable use of natural resources)
- Interactive map of Upper Urashi Forest Reserve
- Location: Ahoada West, Rivers State, Nigeria
- Coordinates: 4°53′24″N 6°30′36″E
- Area: 25,165 ha (97.16 sq mi)
- Established: 30 December 1899
- Governing body: Rivers State Ministry of Agriculture

Ramsar Wetland
- Official name: Upper Urashi Forests
- Designated: 30 April 2008
- Reference no.: 1759

Upper Urashi Forest Reserve is a nature reserve in Rivers State, Nigeria located along the upper reaches of the Urashi River, near the village of Ikodi in Ahoada West. The reserve covers an area of 25,165 ha (97.163 sq mi). It was designated a wetland of international importance under the Ramsar Convention on 30 April 2008.

== Climate ==
The climate of Upper Urashi is a Tropical monsoon climate (Köppen climate classification "Am"), characterized by a lengthy wet season from March to November and a short dry season from December to February. The average annual precipitation is 2510 millimetres (99 in), with the month of September being typically the wettest month of the year. The forest stays inundated from September to November by floodwaters of Urashi River, resulting in siltification and soil fertility augmentation.

== Flora ==
Originally established on 30 December 1899 with 9,696 hectares (37.44 sq mi), it includes a variety of habitat types such as tropical lowland rainforest, moorland, marshes and seasonal lakes. Among the tree species recorded in the reserve, are the Lophira alata, Ricinodendron heudelotii, Albizia adianthifolia and Hexalobus crispiflorus. The Hallea ledermannii, which is important for the forestry industry, is present in this forest, but has dropped significantly as a result of its extensive use. The oil palm trees (Elaeis guineensis) and Musanga cecropioides are also found in the higher areas.

== Fauna ==
The reserve is a minor centre of endemism for sclater's guenon and endangered white-throated guenon, red colobus monkey and Heslop's pygmy hippopotamus. It also does provide a major roosting site for the grey parrot (Psittacus erithacas) and hosts a number of waterbird species whose distribution is confined to the Guinea-Congo Forests biome.

List of Animals

Mammals

- Giant forest hog
- Green bush squirrel
- Pygmy hippopotamus

Reptiles

- Slender-snouted crocodile

Birds

- Grey parrot
- Anambra waxbill
- Hartlaub's duck
- Congo serpent eagle
- Cassin's hawk-eagle
- Blue-headed dove
- Black-throated coucal
- black-casqued Hornbill
- Yellow-rumped tinkerbird
- Lesser honeyguide
- Gabon woodpecker
- Guinea turaco
- Dark-capped yellow warbler
- Grey-chinned sunbird
- White-breasted negrofinch

== Conservation ==
The Upper Orashi Forest Reserve is administered by the Forestry Department of the Rivers State Ministry of Agriculture. It is classified as IUCN protected area category VI (protected area with sustainable use of natural resources) with the objective of sustainable multiple use of forest resources and scientific research, with emphasis on methods for sustainable exploitation of native forests.
