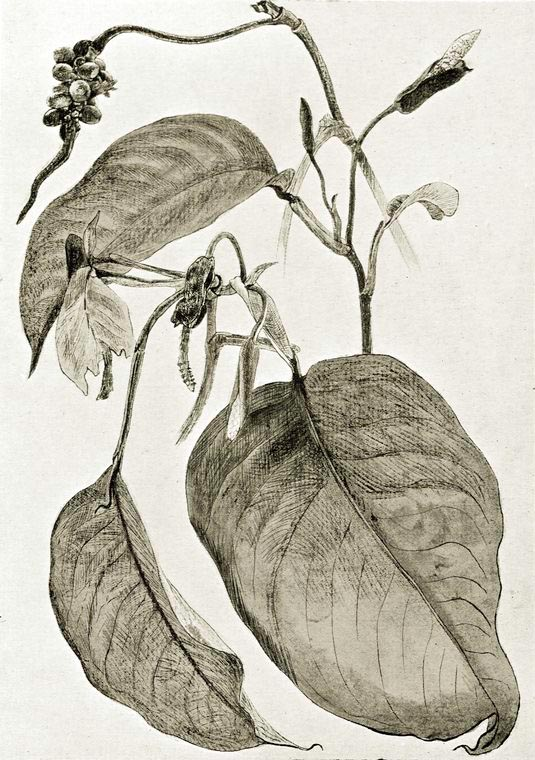
- Culcasia scandens

Scientific classification
- Kingdom: Plantae
- Clade: Embryophytes
- Clade: Tracheophytes
- Clade: Spermatophytes
- Clade: Angiosperms
- Clade: Monocots
- Order: Alismatales
- Family: Araceae
- Genus: Culcasia
- Species: C. scandens

Binomial name
- Culcasia scandens P. Beauv.

Synonyms
- Caladium scandens (P.Beauv.) Willd.; Culcasia gracilis N.E.Br.; Culcasia lancifolia N.E.Br.; Culcasia saxatilis A.Chev.; Denhamia scandens (P.Beauv.) Schott

= Culcasia scandens =

Species of flowering plant

Culcasia scandens is an African climbing plant, often epiphytic, with slender, wiry stems, up to 5 m long clinging to tree trunks by means of clasping roots, and growing on forest and stream margins and in savanna. It is native to countries of western tropical Africa from Senegal east and south to Angola.

Stems are verrucose or warty and somewhat rubbery. The 1-3 inflorescences are terminal, and peduncles 2.5–6 cm; the spathe is green, mucronate, 2–3.5 cm; the spadix is pale yellow to orange, constricted near the base, often exserted, stipe of about 4 mm; ovary is unilocular and uni-ovulate; fruiting spadix terminating in the male portion; berries red, roughly spherical, 10-12 x 8 mm.

The sap, leaves and bark, and infusions, decoctions and pulp prepared from these, are used to treat a variety of ailments and conditions - as analgesic for earache, toothache, tonsillitis and stomach complaints. It is also used as an anti-emetic, for various skin conditions, taken during pregnancy as an anti-abortifacient, and for venereal diseases. The sap is a skin-irritant, rich in alkaloids and leading to its use as a fish poison and as veterinary medicine for goat ailments. Some African tribes mix maize seeds with powdered Culcasia roots and seeds and claim that better crops result, probably due to Culcasia's insecticidal and repellent properties. Leaves are fragrant and a source of coumarin, a perfume ingredient. Extracts from this plant showed no antimicrobial activity against Escherichia coli, Bacillus subtilis, Pseudomonas aeruginosa, Candida albicans, Trichophyton mentagrophytes and Cladosporium resinae. Analysis of the extracts revealed homologous very-long-chain 1,3-alkanediols, homologous series of C31, C33 and C35 alkanols, protoquercitol, methyl -D-fructopyranoside, palmitic acid, stearic acid, linoleic acid, linolenic acid and their methyl esters.

== Gallery ==
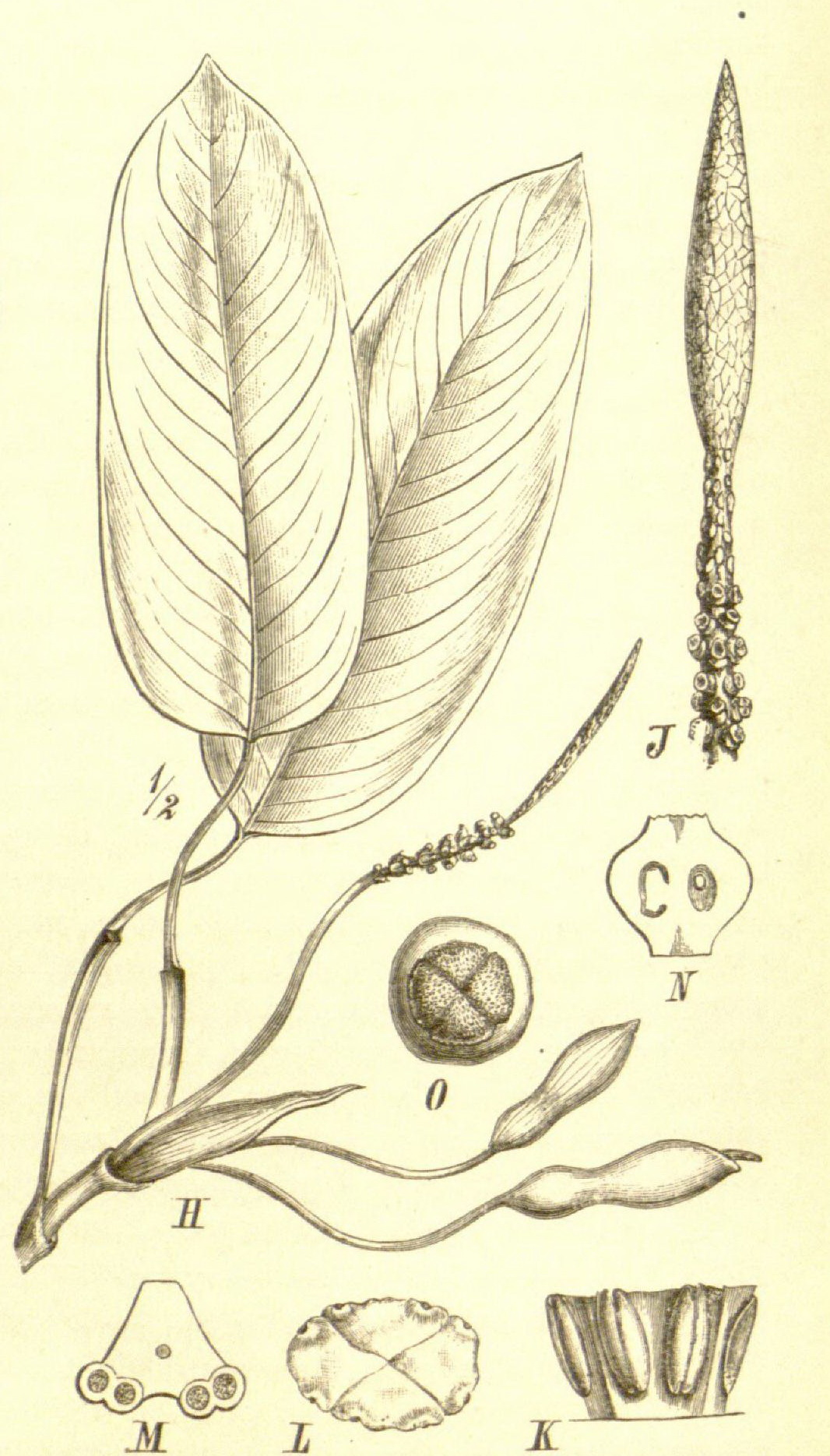
H-Ramulus florifer, spatha una remota J-Spadix
K-Androeceum a latere visum L-Idem supra visum
M-Stamen, transversaliter sectum N-Pistillum longitudinalter sectum O-Stigma

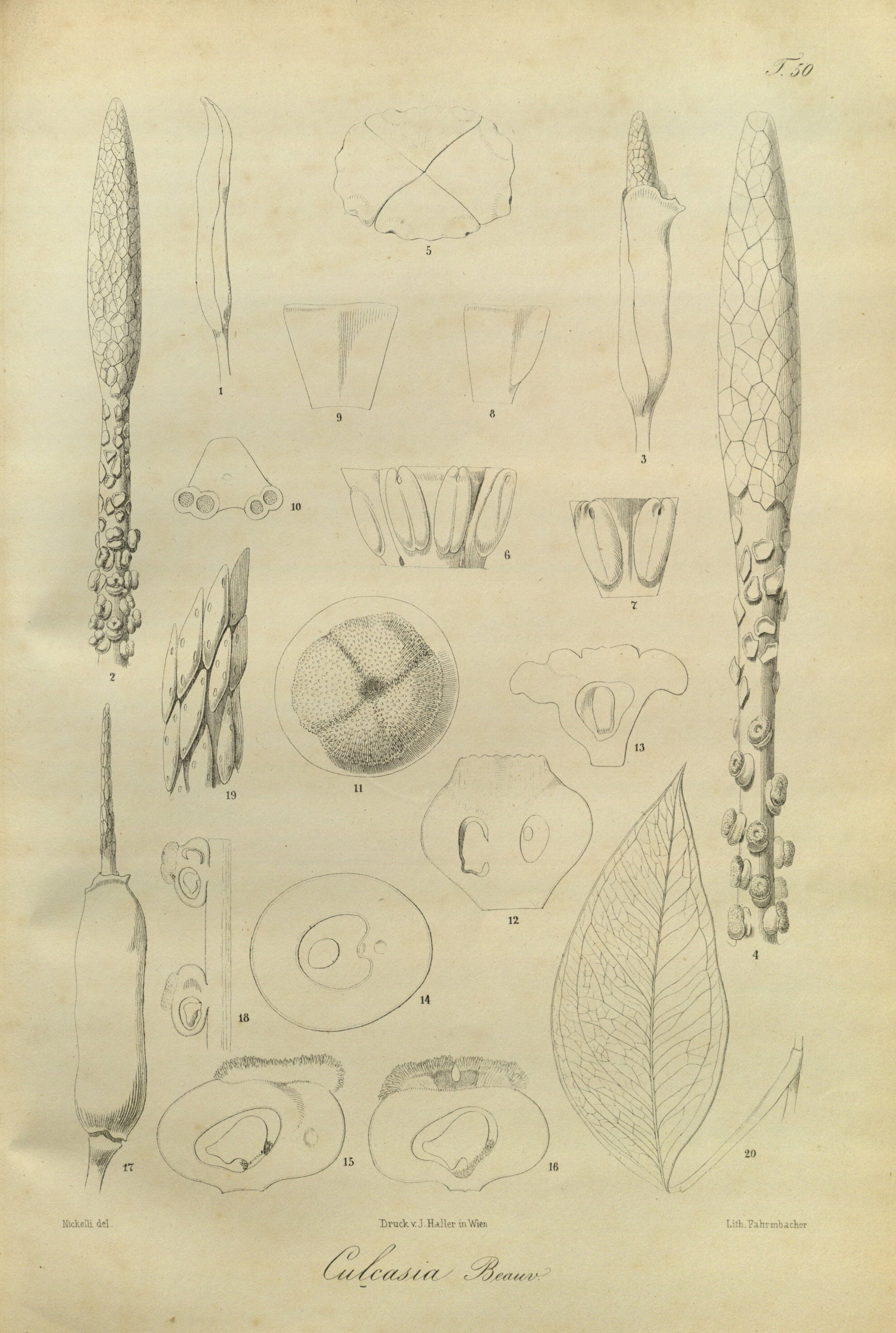
