= Sakpenwa =

Commune in Nigeria

Coordinates: 4°42′54″N 7°15′55″E

Sakpenwa is a community located in Tai Local Government Area, Rivers State, Nigeria. Sakpenwa is the headquarters of the Tai Local Government Area, Rivers State.
