= Abua language =

Cross River language of southern Nigeria

Abua
- Native to: Nigeria
- Region: Rivers State
- Native speakers: (25,000 cited 1989)
- Language family: Niger–Congo?: Atlantic–Congo; Benue–Congo; Cross River; Central Delta; Abua–Odual; Abua

Language codes
- ISO 639-3: abn
- Glottolog: abua1244

Abua (Abuan) is a Central Delta language of Nigeria.

== Writing system ==
Abua alphabet
a	aa	ạ	ạạ	b	ḅ	d	ḍ	e	ee	ẹ	ẹẹ	f	g	gb	gh
i	ii	ị	ịị	j	k	kp	l	m	n	nm	ng	ny	o	oo	ọ
ọọ	p	ph	r	s	t	u	uu	ụ	ụụ	v	w	y	z		

== Phonology ==
=== Consonants ===
		Bilabial	Labiodental	Alveolar	Alveolo- palatal	Palatal	Labial–velar	Velar	Uvular	Glottal
Nasal		m		n		ɲ	ŋ͡m	ŋ		
Stop	unvoiced	p		t			k͡p	k		
Stop	voiced	b		d			ɡ͡b	g		
Affricate										
Fricative	unvoiced		f	s						h
Fricative	voiced	β	v	z				ɣ		
Tap/flap				ɺ						
Trill				r						
Lateral approximant				l						
Semivowel						j	w			
Implosive		ɓ		ɗ						

=== Vowels ===
	Front	Mid-front	Central	Mid-back	Back
Close	i	e	ɨ	o	u
Near-close				ʊ	
Mid			ə		
Open	a	ɛ		ɔ	

=== Tones ===
Abua has 3 tones. /˦/ is high tone, /˨/ is low tone, and /↓˦/ is falling tone.
