= Abua–Odual =

Abua–Odual ABOLGA
- LGA
- Nickname: Awe Abuan
- Motto: Land of Unity
- Interactive map of Abua–Odual
- Location within Nigeria Location within Africa
- Coordinates: 4°48′N 6°48′E
- Country: Nigeria
- State: Rivers State
- Headquarters: Abua
- Date created: 1 October 1900

Government
  - Local Government Chairman: Daniel E. O. Daniel (PDP)
  - Deputy Local Government Chairman: Igoma Laura Emnanuel (PDP)
  - Local Government Council: Ward 1: Engoni Barigoma (PDP); Ward 2: Daniel Abia (PDP); Ward 3: Daima Woodman (PDP); Ward 4: Imaotu Owen (PDP); Ward 5: Abinoye Raymond Oyil (PDP); Ward 6: Mercy Igenewari (PDP); Ward 7: Peter Udubu (PDP); Ward 8: Ipeghan Egemu (PDP); Ward 9: Sokari Okpokikpoy (PDP); Ward 10: Enogho Ebogidi Maclean (PDP); Ward 11: Koginami Okpokpo (PDP); Ward 12: Solomon Geoffrey Okpokpo (PDP); Ward 13: Abigo Odi Izaboh (PDP)

Area
  - Land: 704 km^{2} (272 sq mi)

Population (2006)
  - Total: 282,988
  - Density: 402/km^{2} (1,040/sq mi)
- Time zone: UTC+1 (WAT)

Abua–Odual (also spelled as Abua/Odual) is a Local Government Area in Rivers State, Nigeria. Its headquarters is located in Ayama/Abua Central. The people of Abua are of Ijaw ancestry,. Abua is an ethnicity under the ijaw nation. It has an area of 704 km^{2} and a population of 282,988 at the 2006 census. Abua consists of Otapha, Okpeden, Ogbo Abuan, and Emughan. Each has its ruler and a minimum of seven villages under it. Late Chief John Mark Miwori was a Justice of Peace in Emesu in 2007. The postal code of the area is 510102.

== Communities ==
1. Abada
2. Abual
3. Agada

== Climate/Geography ==
Abua Odual LGA is home to over 213,905 people and has an estimated total size of 704 km^{2}. The average temperature and humidity in the area are 26 degrees Celsius (80 degrees Fahrenheit) and 83 percent, respectively.
