= Obulom language =

Cross River language of southern Nigeria

Obulom
- Native to: Nigeria
- Region: Rivers State
- Native speakers: (3,420 cited 2000)
- Language family: Niger–Congo?: Atlantic–Congo; Benue–Congo; Cross River; Central Delta; Obulom

Language codes
- ISO 639-3: obu
- Glottolog: obul1238
- ELP: Obulom

Obulom is a Central Delta language of Rivers State, Nigeria.
