= Baan language =

Ogoni language of Nigeria

Baan
- Ogoi
- Native to: Nigeria
- Region: Rivers State
- Native speakers: (5,000 cited 1990)
- Language family: Niger–Congo?: Atlantic–Congo; Benue–Congo; Cross River; Ogoni; West Ogoni; Baan

Language codes
- ISO 639-3: bvj
- Glottolog: baan1241
- ELP: Baan

Baan is an Ogoni language of Nigeria.
