= Eleme language =

Language of Nigeria

Eleme
- Native to: Nigeria
- Native speakers: (58,000 cited 1990)
- Language family: Niger–Congo?: Atlantic–Congo; Benue–Congo; Cross River; Eleme

Language codes
- ISO 639-3: elm
- Glottolog: elem1253

Eleme (audio) is a language spoken by Eleme people in the Niger Delta Region of Nigeria. Eleme is a Niger-Congo language spoken by approximately 40–50,000 speakers in Rivers State in southeast Nigeria. It belongs to the Ogonoid (also known as Ogoni or Kegboid) language group, within the Cross River branch of Benue-Congo. The Eleme language was originally divided into two mutual dialects of Nchia and Odido. Nchia was spoken in six communities (Agbonchia, Akpajo, Alesa, Aleto, Alode and Ogale) while the Odido dialect was spoken in Ebubu, Ekporo, Eteo and Onne. Today, both dialects have converged, with a few varying pronunciations.

A unique feature of Eleme is that it uses reduplication to negate verbs.

== Writing System ==
Eleme alphabet (2011)
a	b	ch	d	e	ɛ	f	g	gb	gw	h	i	j	k	kp	kw	l	m	n	nw	ny	o	ɔ	p	r	s	t	u	w	y	ʼ

Nasal vowels are indicated with a tilde ⟨ã ɛ̃ ĩ ɔ̃ ũ⟩.
