= Eleme, Nigeria =

Local government area in Nigeria

Eleme
- LGA
- Interactive map of Eleme
- Location within Nigeria Location within Africa
- Coordinates: 5°05′N 6°39′E
- Country: Nigeria
- State: Rivers State
- Date created: 1996
- Seat: Ogale

Government
  - Local Government Chairman: Chief Obarilomate Ollor (APC)
  - Deputy Local Government Chairman: Virtue Ekee (APC)
  - Local Government Councilors: Ward 1: Victor Daddy Chickere (APC); Ward 2: Clement Ebite Aken (APC); Ward 3: Oyor Michael Apollos (APC); Ward 4: Amejima Obo Olako (APC); Ward 5: Freedom Lekwa (APC); Ward 6: Thompson M. Saloo (APC); Ward 7: Godspower Ndor (APC); Ward 8: Isaac Obele-Chu (APC); Ward 9: Obo John Ezekiel (APC); Ward 10: Jima Daniel Chumu (APC)

Area
  - Total: 138 km^{2} (53 sq mi)

Population (2006)
  - Total: 190,884
  - Density: 1,380/km^{2} (3,580/sq mi)
- Time zone: UTC+1 (WAT)
- Postal code: 500102

Eleme (audio) is a local government area in Rivers State, Nigeria. It is part of the Port Harcourt metropolitan city.

Eleme has its headquarters in the town of Ogale. It covers an area of 138 km^{2} and at the 2006 Census had a population of 190,884. The Eleme people are Eleme's main indigenous ethnic group. Eleme LGA has two districts- Nchia and Odido and both administered under the Crown of the Oneh Eh Eleme (King Of Eleme.)

As explained in a book edited by Imelda Icheji Lawrence Udoh and others, the Eleme language, of the Cross-River branch of the larger Niger-Congo language family, is the main spoken language.

In 2005 Eleme had two of Nigeria's four petroleum refineries.

== Climate/Geography ==
Eleme LGA is made up of numerous rivers and tributaries and has a total size of 138 square kilometres or 53 square miles. The local government region experiences 3,250 mm (128 in) of precipitation annually, with an average temperature of 25 degrees Celsius or 77 degrees Fahrenheit.
