= Rivers State =

State of Nigeria

Rivers
- State
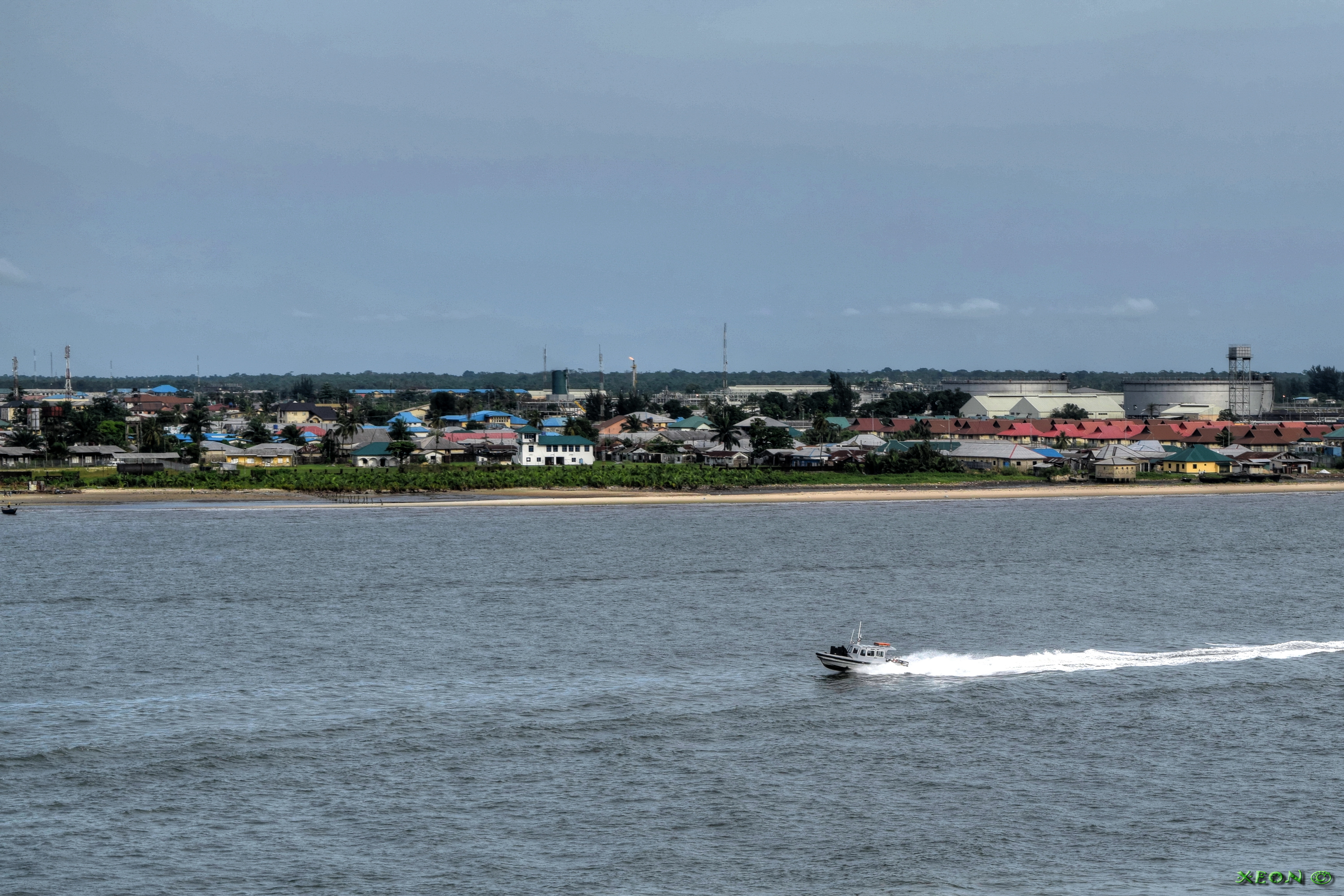

- Flag Seal
- Nicknames: Treasure Base of the Nation
- Location of Rivers State in Nigeria
- Coordinates: 4°45′N 6°50′E
- Country: Nigeria
- Geopolitical zone: South South
- Formation: 27 May 1967 (59 years ago)
- Named for: Niger Delta
- Capital: Port Harcourt
- LGAs: 23

Government
  - Body: Government of Rivers State
  - Governor: Siminalayi Fubara (PDP)
  - Deputy Governor: Ngozi Odu (PDP)
  - Legislature: Rivers State House of Assembly
  - Senators: E: Onyesoh Alwell (PDP); SE: Barry Mpigi (PDP); W: Ipalibo Banigo (PDP)
  - Representatives: List

Area
  - Total: 11,077 km^{2} (4,277 sq mi)
  - Rank: 26th of 36

Population
  - Estimate (2024): 9,898,470
  - Rank: 7th of 36
  - Density: 635.89/km^{2} (1,646.9/sq mi)
- Demonym: Riverian

GDP (PPP)
  - Year: 2021
  - Total: $51.529 billion (PPP); 2nd of 36
  - Per capita: $5,949; 7th of 36
- Time zone: UTC+01 (WAT)
- postal code: 500001
- ISO 3166 code: NG-RI
- HDI (2022): 0.601 medium · 17th of 37
- Website: www.riversstate.gov.ng

Rivers is a state in the Niger Delta region of southern Nigeria. Formed on 27 May 1967, Rivers State borders Imo and Anambra to the north, Abia and Akwa Ibom to the east, and Bayelsa and Delta to the west. The State capital, Port Harcourt, is a metropolis that is considered to be the commercial center of the Nigerian oil industry.

With a population of 5,198,716 as of the 2006 census and an estimated population of 9,898,470 in 2024, Rivers State is the 4th most populous state in Nigeria. Rivers State is a diverse state that is home to many ethnic groups including: , Igbo, Ijaw, Ogoni, and Ikwerre. The state is particularly noted for its linguistic diversity, with 30 Indigenous languages and dialects being said to be spoken in Rivers State. These include Ikwerre, Igbo, Ijaw (Udekama-Degema, Andoni-Obolo, Okrika, Ibani, Kalabari, Ogbia) and Ogoni, Ogba, Ekpeye,. Rivers State is the 25th largest state by area, and its geography is dominated by the numerous rivers that flow through it, including the Bonny River.

The economy of Rivers State is dominated by the state's booming petroleum industry. Although the rise of the oil industry has led to increased revenue for the state government, mismanagement and corruption have prevented the state from rapid development and meaningfully tackling poverty.

Rivers State is considered one of the fastest-growing states in terms of modern infrastructure and urbanization in the country. In recent times, the state commissioned about ten flyovers to aid the movement of citizens.

== History ==
=== Territory and status ===
Rivers State, named after the many rivers that border its territory, was part of the Oil Rivers Protectorate from 1885 till 1893 when it became part of the Niger Coast Protectorate. In 1900, the region was merged with the chartered territories of the Royal Niger Company to form the colony of Southern Nigeria. The state was formed in 1967 with the split of the Eastern Region of Nigeria. In 1996 the state lost territory to form Bayelsa State.

=== 20th century ===
In the early days of the colonial period, several protection treaties were signed between various indigenous communities and the British colonial government. Between 1941 and 1952, agitation for the creation of Rivers Province began with the formation of the Ijo Rivers People's League. By 1953, the Council of Rivers Chiefs was birthed as a replacement body for the League, the same year, another organization, the Calabar Ogoja Rivers (COR) State Movement became existent.

The Council of Rivers Chiefs was later renamed in 1954 to Rivers Chiefs and People's Congress and in 1956, the organization became known as the Rivers Chiefs People's Conference. Until 1958, hopes of an independent state resonated with the region and lingered consistently in the minds of its natives. During the constitutional conference that year, the country's nationhood was affirmed while an agreement was reached on some measures to mitigate the fears of the ethnic minorities in the area. Around this time, the COR State Movement had broken away to press their case. Thereafter, the British launched a commission led by Sir Henry Willink to look into the misgivings of these autochthons. The Willink Commission initiated the conception of the Niger Delta Development Board (NDDB). The purpose was to tackle the problems of underdevelopment, however, this failed to rise to the expectations of the masses. After much discontent, some of the people attempted to take the extralegal route to achieve their goals.

In February 1966, Isaac Boro, Sam Owonaro and Nottingham Dick alongside their supporters proclaimed a "Delta People's Republic". The rebellion persisted for twelve days but was resisted by the Federal and the old Eastern Nigeria government. On 27 May 1967, under the administration of General Yakubu Gowon, Decree No. 14 was issued, allowing the creation of Rivers State. From then on, complaints about political marginalisation, environmental degradation and economic pauperisation remained among the Ijaw groups, such that a separate Bayelsa State was carved out of Rivers State by the military government of Sani Abacha on 1 October 1996 and Omuma Local Government Area of Rivers State was created on the same day to include communities such as Umuru in Ofeh.

== Geography ==
Rivers State is a predominantly low-lying pluvial state in southern Nigeria, located in the eastern part of the Niger Delta on the oceanward extension of the Benue Trough. The inland part of the state consists of tropical rainforest, and towards the coast, the typical Niger Delta environment features many mangrove swamps. Rivers State has a total area of 11,077 km^{2} (4,277 sq mi), making it the 26th largest state in Nigeria. Surrounding states are Anambra for four km, Imo for about 122 km, and Abia for 87 km or 54 miles (partly across the Imo River) to the north, Akwa Ibom to the east across the Imo River and Bayelsa and Delta to the west across the Niger River for about 50 km. On the south, it is bounded by the Atlantic Ocean. Its topography ranges from flat plains, with a network of rivers to tributaries.

=== Climate ===
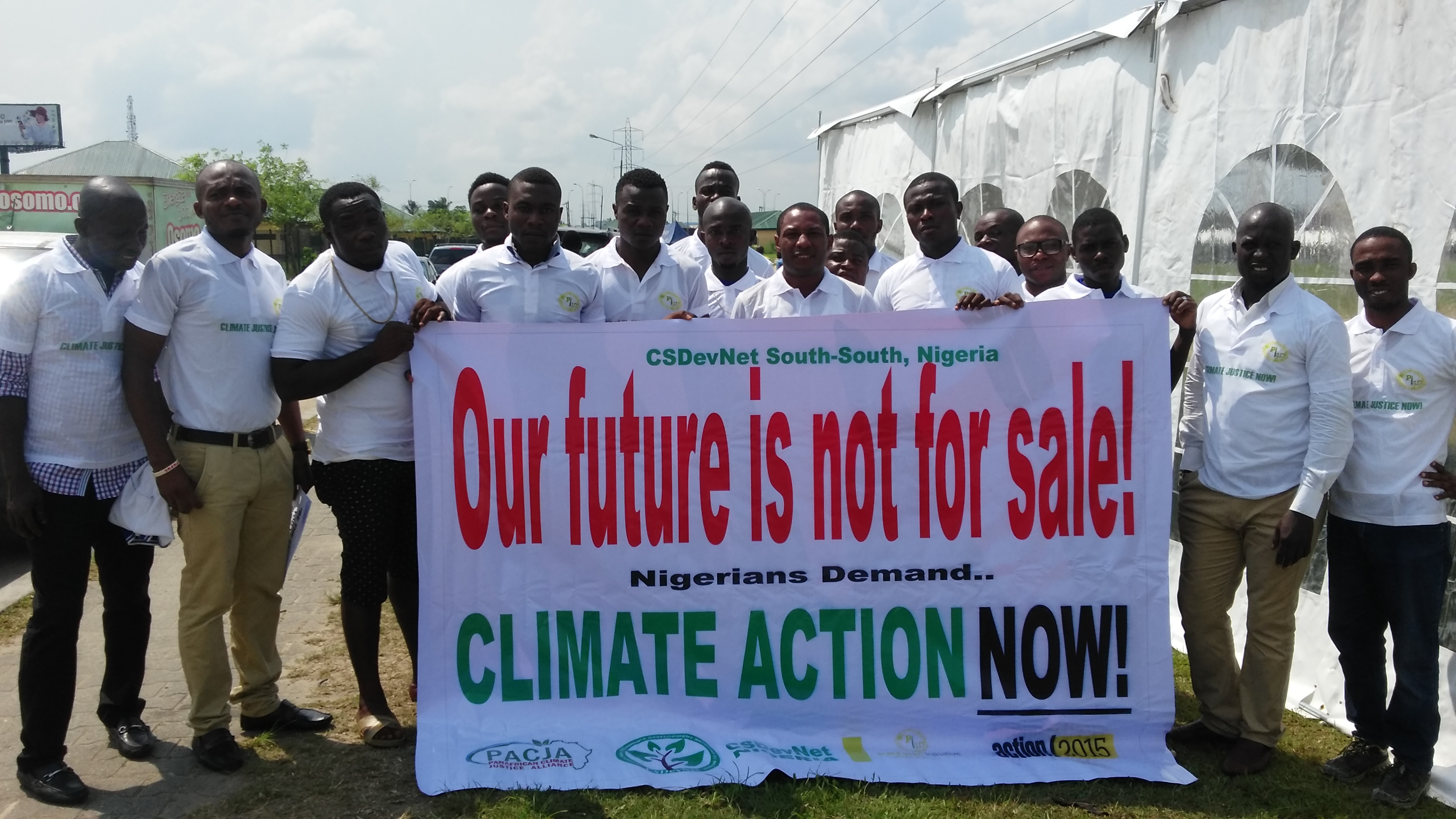
Ogoni Climate activists and others in Port Harcourt protesting environmental degradation in 2015.

Rainfall is generally seasonal, variable, as well as heavy, and occurs between March and October through November. The wet season peaks in July, lasting more than 290 days. The only dry months are January and February having little to no effect.

Total annual rainfall decreases from about 4,700 mm (185 in) on the coast, to about 1,700 mm (67 in) in the extreme north. It is 4,698 mm (185 in) at Bonny along the coast and 1,862 mm (73 in) at Degema. For Port Harcourt, temperatures throughout the year are relatively constant with little variation throughout the seasons. Average temperatures are typically between 25 and 28 °C (77 and 82 °F). Some parts of the state still receive up to 150 mm (6 in) of rainfall during the dry period. Relative humidity rarely dips below 60% and fluctuates between 90% and 100% for most of the year.

=== Terrain ===
The land surface of Rivers State can be divided into three zones: freshwater swamps, mangrove swamps and coastal sand ridges. The freshwater zone extends northwards from the mangrove swamps. This land surface is generally less than 20 m (66 ft) above sea level. As a lower Niger floodplain, it contains a greater silt and clay foundation and is more susceptible to perennial inundation by river floods. The floodplain's total thickness rises to about 45 m (148 ft) in the northeast and over 9 m (30 ft) in the beach ridge barrier zones to the southwest.

On coastal sand ridges, the soils are mostly sandy or sandy loams. Various crops are supported including coconut, oil palm, raffia palm and cocoyam. The drier upland region of Rivers State covers 61% of landmass while the riverine areas, with a relief range of 2 to 5 m (6.6 to 16.4 ft), take up 39%.

=== Flora and fauna ===
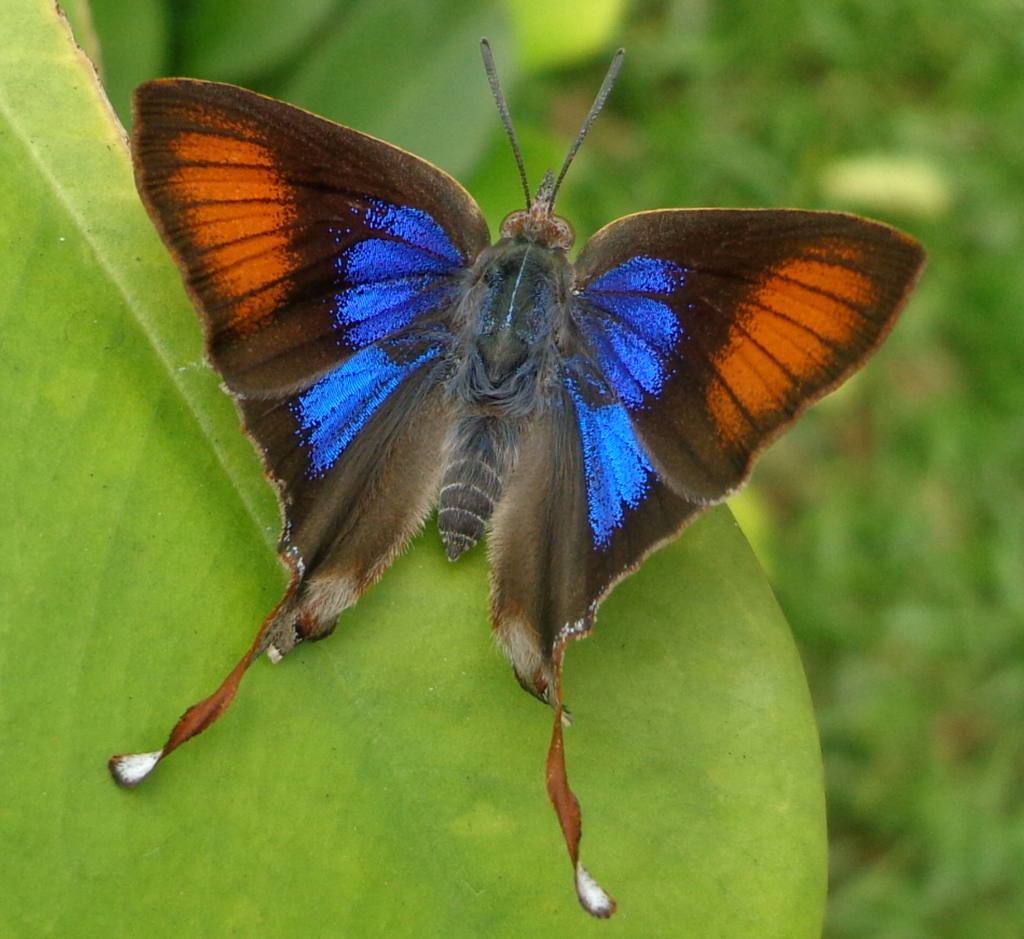
Common fig-tree blue in Port Harcourt Zoo

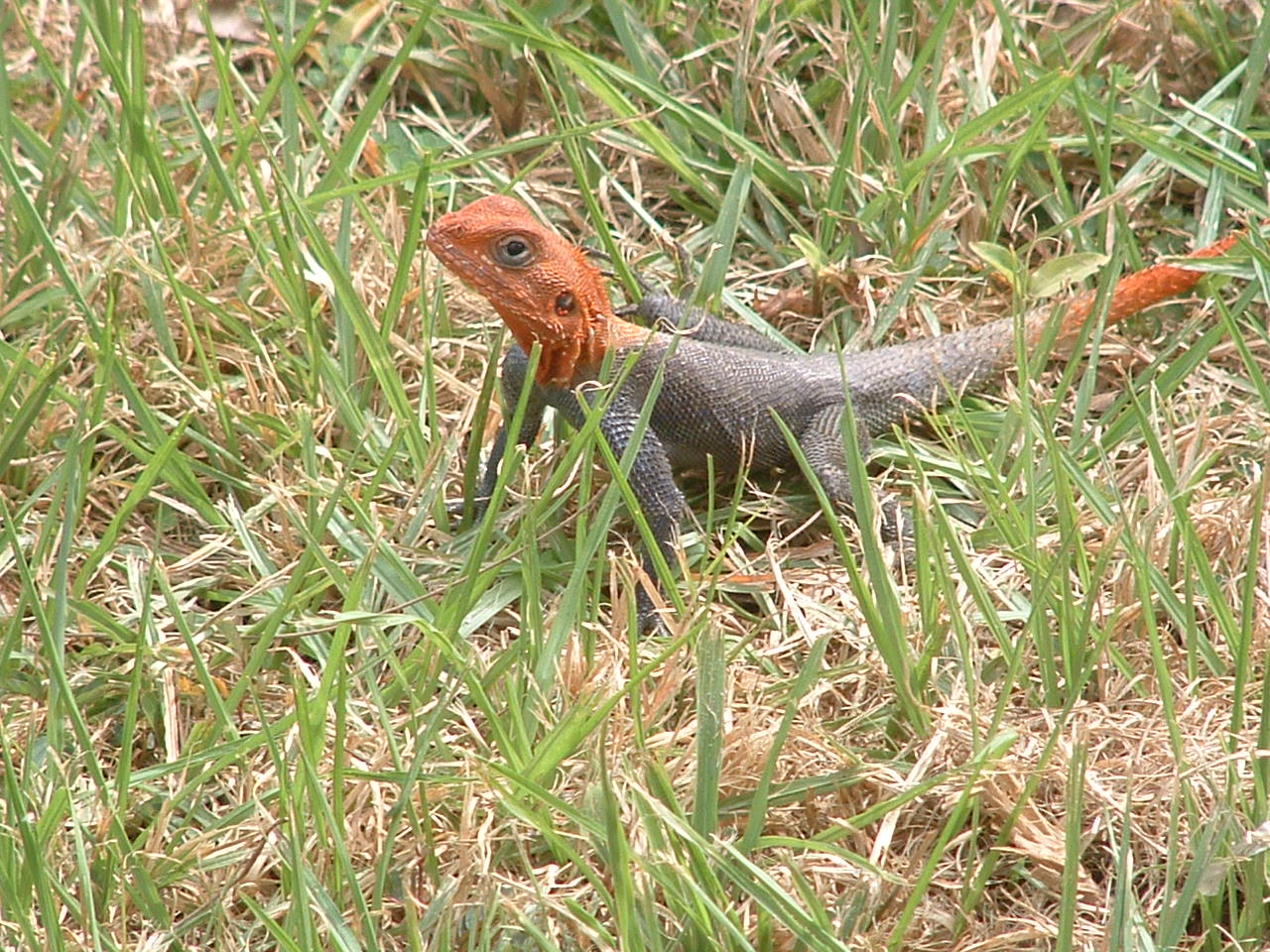
Male Agama lizard

Due to its geographical location, Rivers State has always played an important role in the natural history of Nigeria, having been found to host a vast array of wildlife and plants. Its tropical rainforests are home to more species than all other local biomes combined thanks to its climate and canopy structure. Some of the upland forested areas have seen disruption from human activity, impacting negatively on the biodiversity and ecological functions of natural habitats. In most places, the dominant vegetation usually consists of Elaeis guineensis which has the highest productivity amongst all recognized oleaginous crops.

The riverine part of the state has three hydro-vegetation zones such as beach ridge, salt water and fresh water. Each zone has its characteristics and composition, with the freshwaters encompassing the upper and lower floodplains of the Niger Delta.

Finima Nature Park is a protected area and forest reserve on Bonny Island covering an area of approximately 10 km^{2} (3.9 sq mi). The park's vegetation has progressively developed into a high forest considering the form from which it began in 1999. There are two storeys that can be distinguished from outside the forest, the emergents include Symphonia globulifera, Cleistopholis patens, Uapaca spp., Musanga cecropioides, Hallea ledermannii, Terminalia spp., Anthostema aubryanum, Tectona grandis and Elaeis guineensis. The understory is composed mainly of Calamus deeratus, Alchornea cordifolia, Monodora tenuifolia, Harungana madagascariensis, Strophanthus preussii, Rauvolfia vomitoria and Raphia spp.

The interior of the forest is very shady and as a result a wide variety of shade tolerant forbs (e.g. Nephrolepis biserrata, Culcasia scandens, Laportea spp., Chromolaena odorata, Aframomum melegueta and Costus afer) and various sedges form thickets on the forest floor. By dry season, a large cushion of litter cover the floor because of increase in abscission rate of some plants such as Musanga cecropioides, Hallea ledermannii, Calamus deeratus, Gmelina arborea, Raphia spp. and Elaeis guineensis.

Mammals, reptiles and amphibians are also found in the park. The common mammals are mona monkeys and pygmy hippopotamuses. Among the reptiles and amphibians are snakes and crocodiles, turtles, frogs, lizards, and skinks.

One of the world's Ramsar Convention-listed wetlands, Upper Orashi Forest, is a 252 km^{2} (97 sq mi) protected area in Ahoada West. It has been identified by BirdLife International as an IBA because of its importance to global populations of grey parrots and other birds. The Biseni Forest in the north west of Ahoada and west of Upper Orashi Forest have also been designated an Important Bird Area. The forest has an area of 219 km (136 mi) within which mammals like red-bellied monkey and yellow-backed duiker are found along with raffia palms and some woody broadleaved species such as Symphonia globulifera and Ficus spp.

=== Rivers ===
Satellite view of Niger Delta. Nun River in the center

The state has many rivers. Notable rivers include:

- Andoni River
- Bonny River
- New Calabar River
- Nun River
- Orashi River

== Population ==
=== Demographics ===
Historical population
Year	Pop.	±% p.a.
1991	3,187,844	—
2006	5,198,716	+3.31%
2015 (Est.)	7,043,800	+3.43%
Source: "Rivers State, Nigeria - Population Statistics and Location in Maps and Charts". City Population.

Over the period from 1991 to 2006, the total population of Rivers State increased by close to 3 million people. The last official census showed that 5,198,716 people were living in the state, of whom 2,673,026 were male and 2,525,690 were female. Adults and adolescents aged 15 to 64 years accounted for 61% of the population in the state. Children below the age of 15 accounted for 36% of the population, and those aged 65 years and above, another 3%. Port Harcourt and Obio-Akpor had the highest number of inhabitants of any local government area, while Ogu–Bolo and Omuma had the lowest. The total area of the state was 11,077 km^{2} (4,277 sq mi) and the density was 635.89 inhabitants per square kilometre (1,646.9/sq mi).

According to the world population review (Population of cities in Nigeria), the capital city of Rivers state, Port Harcourt is ranked 4th on the list.

Rivers State has a higher literacy rate compared to most states in the South South geopolitical zone. Its male literacy as of 2006 was 52.3% while the female literacy rate was 47.7%. In the same survey, it ranked as 26th most extensive and the 6th most populous of all the states of Nigeria. A 2015 estimate put the number of residents of Rivers State at over 7 million, nearly triple the number recorded in 1991.

According to the National Bureau of Statistics projection, the population in the state was 4% of the total population of the country. Data of 2010–2015 showed life expectancies for male, 54 years and female, 57 years were very low. General mortality rate was 60 per 1000, under-5 mortality rate was 90 and maternal mortality rate was 889 per 100,000 live births, one of the highest nationwide.

=== Ethnic groups in Rivers State ===
Rivers State has a rich cultural heritage, and its people are friendly and known for their hospitality. The state has 23 distinct ethnic groups including Ijaw , Ekpeye, Ogba, Ikwerre and Ogoni amongst others. It is on record that Port Harcourt is the second biggest commercial, agriculture and busiest airport & seaports in Nigeria. Rivers state has two seaports situated in Port Harcourt and Onne.

=== Languages ===
As a multi-cultural, multi-tribal region, Rivers State has much to offer in its diversity of people. Ikwerre, Ogba, Ekpeye, and Ijaw are the major languages in Rivers State. The area that makes up the modern state has been inhabited in one way or the other since the last year of the first millennium. The earliest known settled communities in what is now Rivers State include the Riverine Ijaw; Ogba, Ogoni, Ikwerre people and among other groups on the mainland. Today, over 26 distinct groups are recognized by the Rivers State government, each with its own language, lifestyle, and cultural heritage.but ikwerre being the most widely spoken.

Multilingualism is a part of everyday life for the population of Rivers State and most of Nigeria. English, inherited from colonial rule is common and widely spoken in various forms in different localities. Some indigenous Riverians are also bilingual, speaking a mixture of English or Pidgin English with one of the native languages. This is partly due to the frequent exposure of the younger generations to foreign languages, especially in the country's largest cities. Excluding Pidgin, all other ones spoken in the state belong to either Benue–Congo or Ijoid and Ogoni Languages within the Niger–Congo language family. The Benue–Congo is subdivided into Cross River, Edoid groups. The Ijoid languages are predominant around the creek belt, Ogoni languages - about 5 of them are spoken across the southern parts of the state, and the Edoid group of languages is spoken in the Northern Areas of the Rivers State.

Aboriginal language dialects	No. of speakers	Mother tongue	Home language
Abua	25,000		
Agbirigba	30		
Baan	50,000		
Biseni	4,800		
Defaka	200		
Degema	30,000		
Ekpeye (ekpeye)	350,000		
Eleme	150,000		
Engenni	20,000		
Ijaw	200,000		
Ikwerre (Niger congo)	2,000,000		
Kalabari	570,000		
Kugbo	2,000		
Nkoroo	4,600		
O’chi’chi’	—		
Obolo	250,000		
Obulom	3,420		
Odual	18,000		
Ogba	200,000		
Ogbogolo	10,000		
Ogbronuagum	12,000		
Khana	500,000		
Okodia	3,600		
Oruma	5,000		
Tee	100,000		
Ukwuani-Aboh-Ndoni (edoid)	50,000		

Languages of Rivers State listed

LGA	Languages
Abua-Odual	Central Delta languages (Kugbo,Odual, Ogbia)
Ahoada East	Ekpeye language (Ekpeye)
Ahoada West	Ekpeye language (Egenni)
Akuku Toru	Ijoid languages (Kalabari, Bille)
Andoni	Lower Cross language (Obolo)
Asari-Toru	Ijoid language (Kalabari)
Degema	Kalabari language (Degema), Central Delta languages (Abua, Ogbronuagum) Ijoid languages (Kalabari, Ijaw Bille)
Bonny	Ijoid language (Ndoki/ibani), Ijoid language (Ijaw)
Eleme	Ogoni languages (Eleme, Baan, Nchia; Odido)
Emuohua	Ikwerre language (Ikwerre)
Etche	Etche language (Etche)
Gokana	Ogoni language (Gokana)
Ikwerre	Ikwerre language (Ikwerre)
Khana	Ogoni languages (Khana, Baan)
Obio-Akpor	Ikwerre language (Ikwerre)
Ogba-Egbema-Ndoni	Ijoid languages (Ogba, Egbema, Ndoni)
Ogu-Bolo	Ijoid language (Kirike)
Okrika	Ijoid languages (Kirike), Ijaw language
Opobo-Nkoro	Ijoid languages (Ndoki/ibani) Ijoid languages (Ibani, Defaka, Nkoroo)
Oyigbo	Ogoni language (Ndoki, Asa), Ogoni languages (Khana, Baan)
Port Harcourt	Ikwerre language (Ikwerre)
Omumma	Etche language (Etche)
Tai	Ogoni languages (Tee/Tai, Baan)

== Economy ==
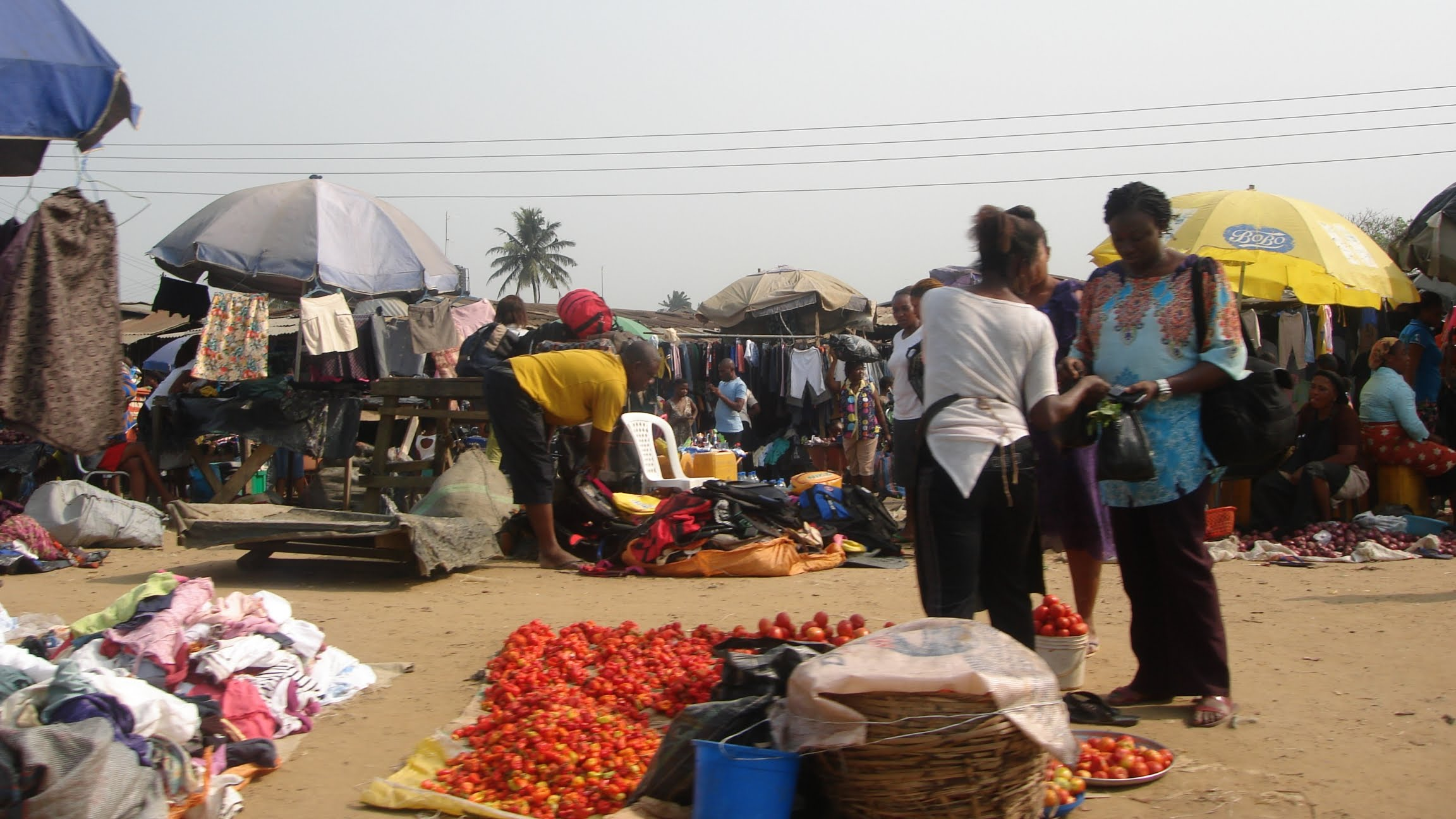
A market in Igwuruta, Rivers State

Rivers State has maintained its importance as a leading supplier of wealth to the nation for centuries. In 2021, the state ranked 2nd nationwide with a gross domestic product (GDP) of $51.529 billion and a per capita income of $5,949 (PPP).

=== Natural resources ===
The state is famous for its vast reserves of crude oil and natural gas. It was perhaps the richest and most important section of the African zone of the British Empire. Rivers State has two major oil refineries, two major seaports, airports, and various industrial estates spread across the land. More than 60% of the country's output of crude oil is produced in the state. Other natural resources found within its boundaries are silica, glass sand and clay.

=== Agriculture ===
Prior to the discovery of oil in commercial quantity in 1951, Agriculture was the primary occupation of the people of Rivers State. Around the 19th century when the Industrial Revolution reached its peak in England, the area was then referred to as Oil Rivers Protectorate, this was due to its abundant palm oil and kernel which basically constituted the main revenue source of the country. In a sample survey carried out by the Federal Ministry of Agriculture and Natural Resources, about 40% of the rural inhabitants were committed to farming in 1983. Rivers State is one of the leading states in the production of yam, cassava, cocoyam, maize, rice and beans. About 39% (760,000 hectares) of the state's total land mass, particularly in the upland area, is suitable for cultivation. Major cash crops produced are oil palm products, rubber, coconut, raffia palm and jute. Other crops grown for food include vegetables, melon, pineapples, mango, pepper, banana and plantain. The fishing industry is an important sector in Rivers State. Besides being lucrative, fishing is also a favourite pastime activity. There are approximately 270 species of fish existing; with many artisanal fishermen in the riverine areas. The state provides valuable seafood such as crabs, oysters, shrimps and sea snails among others. Vertebrates like birds, mammals and reptiles are also found in the region.

== Infrastructure ==
=== Energy ===
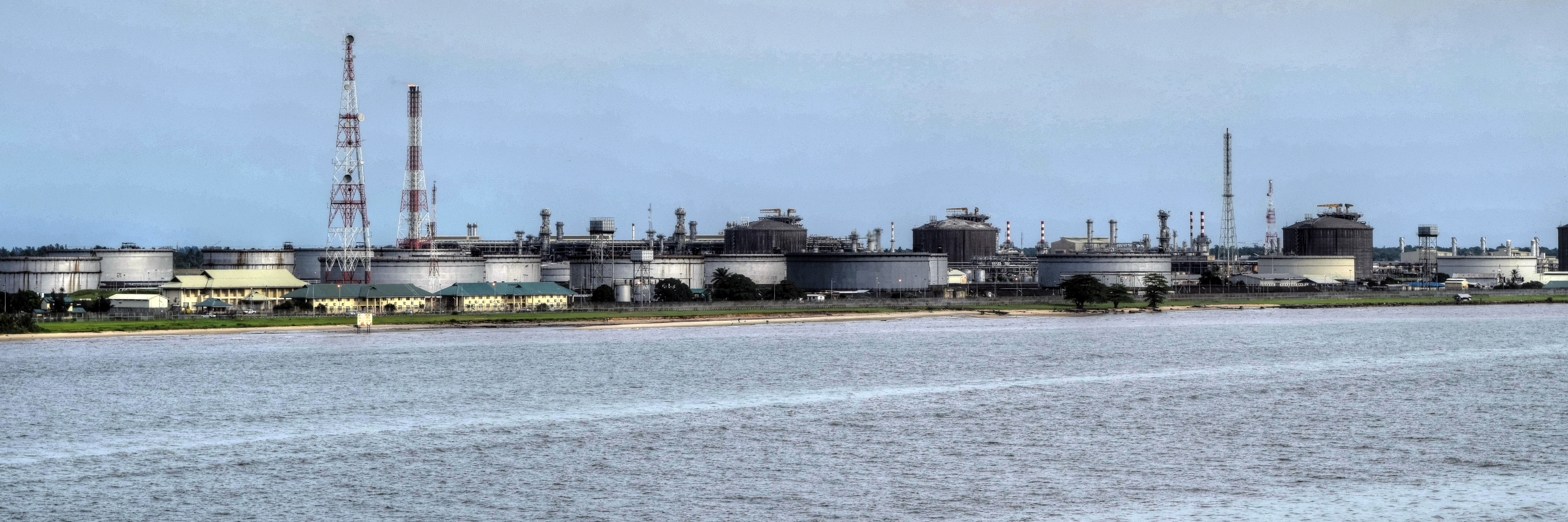
Oil facility at Bonny Island

Energy, and especially electricity is the key factor for economic growth. Rivers State has one of the nation's highest per capita energy consumption rates. As of 2012, it had a power generation capacity of 400 megawatts, a significant improvement over a meagre 30 megawatts during the late nineties. Its energy sector is protected by the government through legislation and funding. It is overseen by the ministries of Power, Energy and Natural Resources. The state's oil-refining capacity is the biggest in the country, with more than 340,000 barrels of crude oil per day.

There's a vast untapped potential in the state for solar power. Interest in solar energy has been increasing but not much has been invested. Up to now, energy production has been insufficient to meet demand, resulting in frequent power outages, slow manufacturing and low business performance.

=== Transportation ===
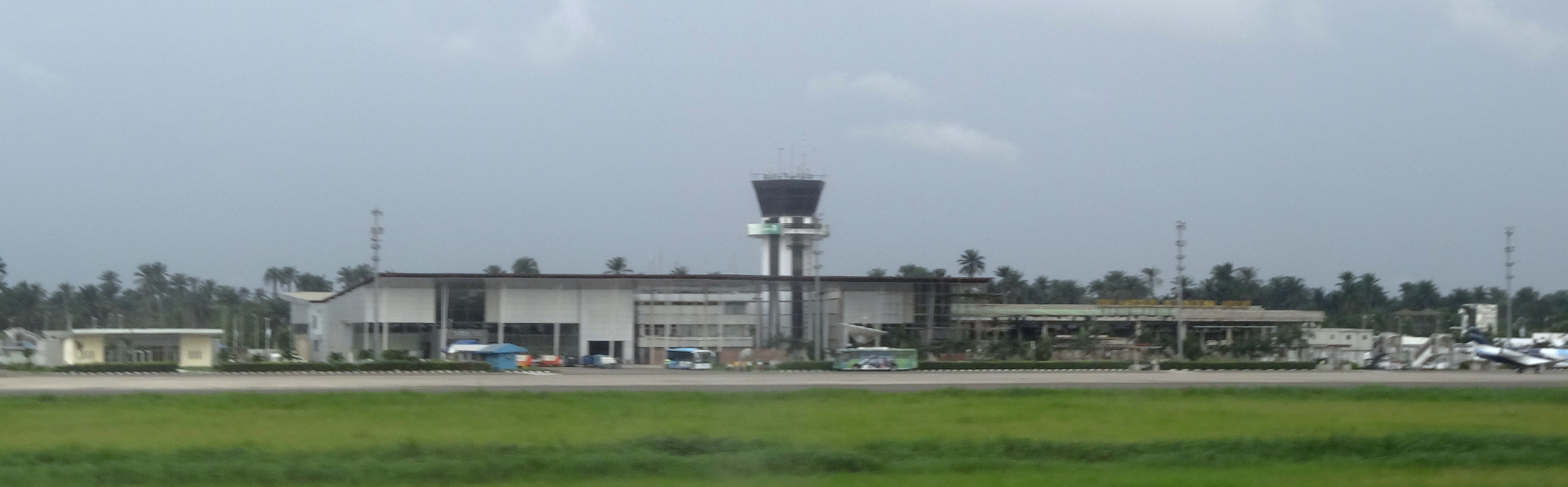
Port Harcourt International Airport, Omagwa

Transportation within Rivers State is mainly land and water-based. The industry has the Ministry of Transport as its chief regulating body. Apart from roads and waterways, there are functional airdromes that provide out-of-state transport. The seaports contain harbors where ships can dock and transfer people or cargo to or from land.

Federal highways are A2 the Elele-Alimini-Patani East-West Rd from Elele to Bayelsa State at Mbiama, A3 east as the Port Harcourt Enugu Expressway to Abia State and A231 north from A3 in Port Harcourt 42 km via Igwuruta and Omagwa to A2 in Elele.

Other major roads include

- the Owerri-Ahoada Rd northeast to Imo State,
- the Abua-Ogbia Rd north to Ahoada where the Ogura-Omoku Rd continues to Imo State,
- the Rumuji-Mpakurche Rd northwest from Port Harcourt to the Rumuji-Elele Alimini Rd,
- the Ulakwo Rd northeast from Olakwo to Imo State,
- the Eberi-Obiga Rd north from Owaza to Abia State,
- the Asa-Akwere-Obohia Rd east from Owaza to Abia State, and
- the Alese Rd southeast from Port Harcourt to the Ikot Akan-Deyor Chara Rd across the Imo River at Kalaoko to Akwa Ibom State.

Taxicabs, buses and ferries dominate public transport. They are usually inexpensive and are often used for multi-passenger pick-ups. Commercial vehicles in Port Harcourt maintain sky blue, white and sky blue livery. Operating without these government-approved colours is punishable with a fine of up to ₦10,000.

The 1067 mm Cape Gauge Eastern Railway Line north from Port Harcourt to Aba in Abia State, built 1913–16, restored 2009–15.

Both domestic and international flights are available from Port Harcourt International Airport. Airlines such as Lufthansa, Air France, Qatar Air, Ethiopian Airlines, Med-View, Air Peace and Cronos link the state to destinations including Frankfurt, Paris, Lagos and Malabo. Passengers can easily get a taxi or rental car at the authorized vehicle area. Companies like Europcar, Avis and Hertz have offices near the airport. In addition, the Port Harcourt Air Force Base is located in the state capital. It gained popularity as a commercial destination due to the closure of the international airport. After that airport reopened, most airlines abandoned the base. However, it still has some destinations since the airport is closer to the centre than the main airport.

Seaports handle much more diversified import cargo activities than airports. The Port of Onne is one of the largest and busiest seaports in the country. Its mobile harbour cranes are one of the biggest in Africa, with a lifting capacity of 208 metric tonnes. Another important seaport is the Port of Port Harcourt. It was the second-largest port in Nigeria in the 1950s. In 1954, it cleared about $54 million worth of imports and exports, while the shipping facilities at Calabar cleared $11 million worth of goods.

=== Water ===
The majority of Riverians obtain their water for household use from vendors. There are also those who extract their water from private boreholes and wells and incur costs for the investment, maintenance, spare parts, pumping, and in some cases treating the water. Several others receive their domestic water from rainwater catchments, nearby streams or rivers. In the oil-bearing communities, many residents have easy access to basic infrastructure systems, although, most of the facilities are nonfunctional.

In large urban localities such as Port Harcourt and Obio-Akpor, Port Harcourt Water Corporation handles the provision of urban water supply and wastewater management services for 15% of the population. A number of towns and villages with iron-contaminated H_{2}O have resorted to treating one chemical contaminant with another. Most of the water collection in low-income urban residential areas is done by women. In 2008, NDHS reported that 26% of adult females collect drinking water more than adult male counterparts at 21%.

In order to improve access to safe, reliable, affordable, and sustainable water supply services, USAID, through its Sustainable Water and Sanitation in Africa program collaborated with the Ministry of Water Resources and Rural Development from April 2013 to June 2015.

== Government and politics ==
The Rivers State government consists of elected representatives and appointed officials. The state government has executive and legislative branches, with an independent judiciary. At the local level, elected officials are responsible for local government areas.

=== Electoral system ===
The governor of the state is selected using a modified two-round system. To be elected in the first round, a candidate must receive the plurality of votes and over 25% of the vote in at least two-thirds of the state local government areas. If no candidate passes the threshold, a second round will be held between the top candidate and the next candidate to have received a plurality of votes in the highest number of local government areas.

=== Executive ===
The executive branch is headed by the Governor, assisted by the Deputy Governor, both elected for a term of 4 years (maximum of 2 terms). The governor appoints commissioners responsible for each of the ministries and appoints the heads of parastatals and the state-owned bodies with specific regulatory or administrative duties. In some cases, a governor may be replaced or removed for example, through death, impeachment or if an election is annulled by a competent court of law or by a two-thirds majority of the House of Assembly. The incumbent governor is Siminalayi Fubara a member of the People Democratic Party, who heads the council of Rivers State. Fubara was sworn in on 29 May 2023. He is the 7th Democratic governor of the state and the 16th overall governor of River State

=== Legislature ===
The legislative authority in Rivers State is held by the state House of Assembly, which is made up of elected representatives from all constituencies of the state. Its functions at the state level are relative to those of the National Assembly at the federal level, creating laws for the good governance of the state, as well as acting as a check and balance on the powers and actions of the state's Chief Executive. The House of Assembly consists of three times the total number of seats which the state has in the House of Representatives.

=== Judiciary ===
The judicial branch of the state government has sole authority and responsibility for the interpretation and application of the state's laws as well as the adjudication of disputes or controversies. It consists of eight courts: the High Court of Justice, the Magistrates Courts, the Customary Courts, the Juveniles Courts, the Revenue Courts, the Sanitation Courts, the Mobile Courts and Ports Related Offences Courts. It is governed mainly by the Chief Judge of the High Court of Justice. There are about 26 serving judges in the High Court of Justice, which comprises 10 Judicial Divisions including Port Harcourt, Ahoada, Degema, Nchia, Bori, Omoku, Isiokpo, Okrika, Okehi, and Oyigbo.

=== Federal representation ===
Elections are conducted every 4 years in which Riverian voters will directly elect 16 representatives to the Nigerian National Assembly. Those chosen are grouped into 3 senators representing Rivers South East, Rivers West, Rivers East and 13 representatives representing Andoni/Opobo/Nkoro, Obio/Akpor, Oyigbo/Tai/Eleme, Port Harcourt II, Etche/Omuma, Asari-Toru/Akuku-Toru, Okrika/Ogu–Bolo, Khana/Gokana, Port Harcourt I, Ahoada West/Ogba–Egbema–Ndoni, Abua–Odual/Ahoada East, Ikwerre/Emohua, Degema/Bonny. Since the advent of the Fourth Republic in 1999, the People's Democratic Party has usually held a majority in both the Senate and the House of Representatives.

=== Local Government Areas ===
Rivers State currently consists of 23 Local Government Areas (LGAs), all of which handle local administration, under an elected chairman. Each of the local government areas has its own administrative seat. They are:

LGA name	Area (km^{2})	Census 2006 population	Administrative seat	Postal Code	Wards
Port Harcourt	109	541,115	Port Harcourt	500	20
Obio-Akpor	260	464,789	Rumuodumaya	500	17
Okrika	222	222,026	Okrika	500	12
Ogu–Bolo	89	74,683	Ogu	500	12
Eleme	138	190,884	Nchia	501	10
Tai	159	117,797	Sakpenwa	501	10
Gokana	126	228,828	Kpor	501	17
Khana	560	294,217	Bori	502	19
Oyigbo	248	122,687	Afam	502	10
Opobo–Nkoro	130	151,511	Opobo Town	503	11
Andoni	233	211,009	Ngo	503	11
Bonny	642	215,358	Bonny	503	12
Degema	1,011	249,773	Degema	504	17
Asari-Toru	113	220,100	Buguma	504	13
Akuku-Toru	1,443	156,006	Abonnema	504	17
Abua–Odual	704	282,988	Abua	510	13
Ahoada West	403	249,425	Akinima	510	12
Ahoada East	341	166,747	Ahoada	510	13
Ogba–Egbema–Ndoni	969	284,010	Omoku	510	17
Emohua	831	201,901	Emohua	511	14
Ikwerre	655	189,726	Isiokpo	511	13
Etche	805	249,454	Okehi	512	19
Omuma	170	100,366	Eberi	512	10

=== Notable Political events ===
On 18 March 2025, President Bola Ahmed Tinubu declared a state of emergency in Rivers State, Nigeria, due to political turmoil and rising insecurity. Governor Siminalayi Fubara, his deputy, and the entire House of Assembly were suspended for six months. Vice Admiral Ibokette Ibas (Rtd) was appointed as Administrator to restore order. While the judiciary remained unaffected, the move aimed to address governance failures, pipeline vandalism, and security issues in the oil-rich state.

The Nigerian Bar Association criticized the suspension of elected officials as unconstitutional, emphasizing that a state of emergency does not dissolve elected governments.

The President officially lifted the emergency rule in Rivers State in a presidential statement on Wednesday 17 September 2025. Governor Siminalayi Fubara, Deputy Governor Ngozi Odu, and the members of the Rivers State House of Assembly, including Speaker Martins Amaewhule, resumed their duties starting 18 September 2025.

== Media ==
- Rhythm 93.7FM
- Raypower 100.5FM
- International Magazine Subscription Ltd
- RIVERS STATE BROADCASTING CORPORATION TV
- Africa Independent Television [AIT].
- NTA Channel 10, Port Harcourt.
- Wish 99.5 FM
- Today 95.1 FM
- Naija FM 92.7 FM
- Nigeria Info 92.3 FM
- Wazobia 94.1 FM
- FAMILY LOVE FM 97.7 FM
- Radio Rivers 99.1 FM

== Education ==
=== Primary and secondary education ===
As at 1999, the state had 2,805 government primary schools and 243 secondary schools. The secondary schools are concentrated mainly in LGA headquarters towns and in Port Harcourt.

=== Colleges and universities ===
Tertiary institutions include:

- Captain Elechi Amadi Polytechnic, formerly Port Harcourt Polytechnic
- Eastern Polytechnic
- Federal College of Education (Technical), Omoku.
- Ignatius Ajuru University at Rumuolumeni, Nkpolu Oroworukwo and Ndele.
- Kenule Beeson Saro-Wiwa Polytechnic
- Wigwe University
- PAMO University of Medical Sciences, Elelenwo, Port Harcourt
- Rivers State University, at Nkpolu Oroworukwo, Port Harcourt.
- University of Port Harcourt, Choba.

== Political wards ==
There are three hundred and nineteen (319) wards in Rivers State.

== See also ==
- Index of Rivers State-related articles
- Outline of Rivers State
- List of governors of Rivers State
- List of people from Rivers State
