= Pepple =

Pepple is a surname. It may refer to:

- Adawari Pepple, Nigerian politician
- Amal Pepple (born 1949), Nigerian civil servant
- Aribim Pepple (born 2002), professional soccer player
- Fubara Manilla Pepple (died 1792), king of Bonny
- Valentine Manilla Pepple (born 1967), Nigerian lawyer, stockbroker, clergyman and traditional aristocrat
- George Oruigbiji Pepple (1849–1888), king of Bonny
