= Bonny Island =

Island in the Niger Delta region of Nigeria

Coordinates: 4°26′57″N 7°14′24″E

- Location within Nigeria
- Interactive map of Bonny Island

Geography
- Location: Niger Delta

Administration
- Nigeria
- State: Rivers

Demographics
- Population: 17,700

Bonny Island is an island and local government area situated at the southern edge of Rivers State in the Niger Delta region of Nigeria near Port Harcourt. Ferries were the primary form of transport, though recently an airstrip has been built and it is fully functional, with flights from Lagos, Abuja and Port Harcourt respectively to and from the island. The local dialect spoken in Bonny Island is the Ibani dialect of the Ijaw language.

The Kingdom of Grand Bonny is located 40 kilometres (25 miles) southwest of Port Harcourt, the capital of Rivers State of Nigeria. It lies within latitude 40° 278°, longitude of 7° 1000° and borders the shores of Southern Atlantic Ocean into which its main River, the Bonny Estuary, finally flows.

It shares boundaries with the Billes and Kalabaris in the West, the Andonis in the East, the Okirikans and the Ogonis in the North and the Atlantic Ocean form the boundary in the South.

== History ==
Located at the edge of the Atlantic Ocean on the Bight of Biafra, the island of Bonny serves as the seat of a traditional state known as the Kingdom of Bonny.

Admiralty Chart No. 3287 showing the Bonny River Entrance, published in 1965.

=== Founding ===
Said to be founded by Alagbariya, an Ijaw hunter, who migrated to the Azumini Creek on a hunting expedition, and settled finally with his family on the virgin island. The original name given to the first settlement, which began as a small town was called Okuloma, a name christened after the Okulo (lit. Curlews) who inhabited the island in large numbers.

Another version states that the founders of the island kingdom were originally Ijaw people from Ebeni in modern Bayelsa State. The founder, Opara Ndoli, a man from the Isedani lineage of Kolokuma in the Ebeni-toru region (in the present day Kolokuma/Opokuma Local Government Area of Bayelsa), ruled for the duration of his life. He founded the kingdom before or about 1000 AD. In the 1400s, contacts with the Portuguese traders led to Bonny's growth into a slave trading hub until the British took over and ended the slave trade by 1830.

== Structure of the kingdom ==
The monarch, or Amanyanabo (lit. owner of the land), is provided by the Pepple dynasty and presides over a chieftaincy system composed of "Ase-Alapu" (or high chiefs of royal blood) and "Amadapu" (or district heads). All of the former serve as members of the Bonny Chiefs' Council, the amanyanabo's privy council.

Bonny Island has thirty-five sub-sectional units (known as Houses). All represent the progeny of the founding generation of its kingdom. A few prominent houses are:

(i) The Fubara Manilla Pepple House,

(ii) The Wilcox House,

(iii) The Jumbo House,

(iv) The Awusa Halliday House,

(v) The Captain Hart House, and

(vi) The Banigo House.

The different houses are known for having individual ancestral headquarters and high chiefs.

== Notable events ==
Bonny Island was a hotbed of economic activity right from the 15th century. The Portuguese arrived at this time, and the island kingdom subsequently established good relations with them. It sent its first ambassador, Prince Abagy, to Portugal in about 1450AD.

In the 19th Century AD, Bonny Island accepted Christianity through the ministry of Bishop Samuel Ajayi Crowther. Prior to this event, the totem of the kingdom had been the monitor lizard.

It was also in that century that a civil war was fought between those loyal to Chief Oko Jumbo of the Manilla Pepple house and those loyal to Chief Jaja of the Anne Pepple house. This war eventually led to the establishment of the Kingdom of Opobo.

== Bonny today ==
Bonny's traditional institution is headed by King Edward William Asimini Dappa Pepple III, Perekule XI, who serves as amanyanabo and natural ruler. The Chiefs' Council is led by Chief Reginald Abbey-Hart, who is the high chief and head of Captain Hart house. Each high chief independently rules his house because the chiefs' council is traditionally seen as a commonwealth of independent nations that came together for the sole purpose of protecting the kingdom as a whole.

The community is subdivided into two main segments – the mainland and the hinterland. The mainland comprises Bonny Island and its segments, namely the Main Island (Township), Sandfield, Iwoama, Orosikiri, Aganya, Ayambo, Akiama, New Road, Wilbross Pipeline, Workers Camp, and some outlying fishing settlements lying along the Bonny River's coastline. The hinterland includes the village communities such as Kuruma, Ayama, Kalaibiama and Oloma.

Presently, the Kingdom of Bonny has thirty-five chieftaincy houses. There are fourteen major chieftaincy houses (five among which are Duawaris); twenty minor chieftaincy houses; and then the George Pepple lineage of the Perekule royal house that has recently been producing kings of the kingdom. The ancestry of the Perekule royal house may be traced to the Duawaris themselves.

It was the founding generation of Bonny that established the kingdom's civilisation and commonwealth. All the chieftaincy houses, and the people that belong to them, derive their authority in Bonny from their descent from its founders.

The federal government of Nigeria through partnership with Nigeria LNG Limited is building a 39 km road that will connect Bonny Island to the Ogoni community of Bodo in the mainlaind of Rivers State. The road will reduce both the risk and the travel time to the island spent on travelling through air and also boost tourism and economy on the island. Babatunde Fashola, Nigeria's minister of works and housing, confirmed at a project commissioning that the road will be ready by the end of 2023. The road was flagged off by the vice-president of Nigeria, Professor Yemi Osibanjo in 2017.

== Economy ==
In the early 1990s the Federal Government of Nigeria, in collaboration with 3 international partners, Shell Gas BV., CLEAG Limited [ELF] and AGIP International BV. started the multibillion-dollar project Nigeria Liquefied Natural Gas Limited (Nigeria LNG).

Due to its strategic position, Bonny Island, particularly the Finima community area along Bonny Island, is hosting various multinational oil companies including Royal Dutch Shell, Mobil, Chevron, Agip, and TotalEnergies.

== Education ==
Public and private secondary schools in Bonny island include:

- Bonny National Grammar School
- Island STEM Education Center
- Spring Foundation Group of Schools
- Favourite International Academy
- St.Paul's Comprehensive College
- Government Girls Secondary School, Finima
- Community Secondary School
- Lucille Education Centre
- Kingdom Heritage
- King and Queen High School
- RA International School
- Logos International School
- Twilight Nursery and Primary School

Institution:

- Federal Polytechnic of Oil and Gas, Bonny

== Climate ==
The climate of Bonny is tropical monsoon. Throughout the year, temperatures usually fall between 25 °C (77 °F) and 28 °C (82 °F), can occasionally fall as low as 22 °C (72 °F) or climb as high as 33 °C (91 °F). There are 299 wet days on the 1 mm (0.04 inches) threshold per year, and the average annual precipitation is roughly 3260 mm (128.4 inches). Throughout the year, Bonny receives 3396 hours of sunshine on average, with daily daylight ranging from 11 hours to 12 hours.

== Tourist attractions ==
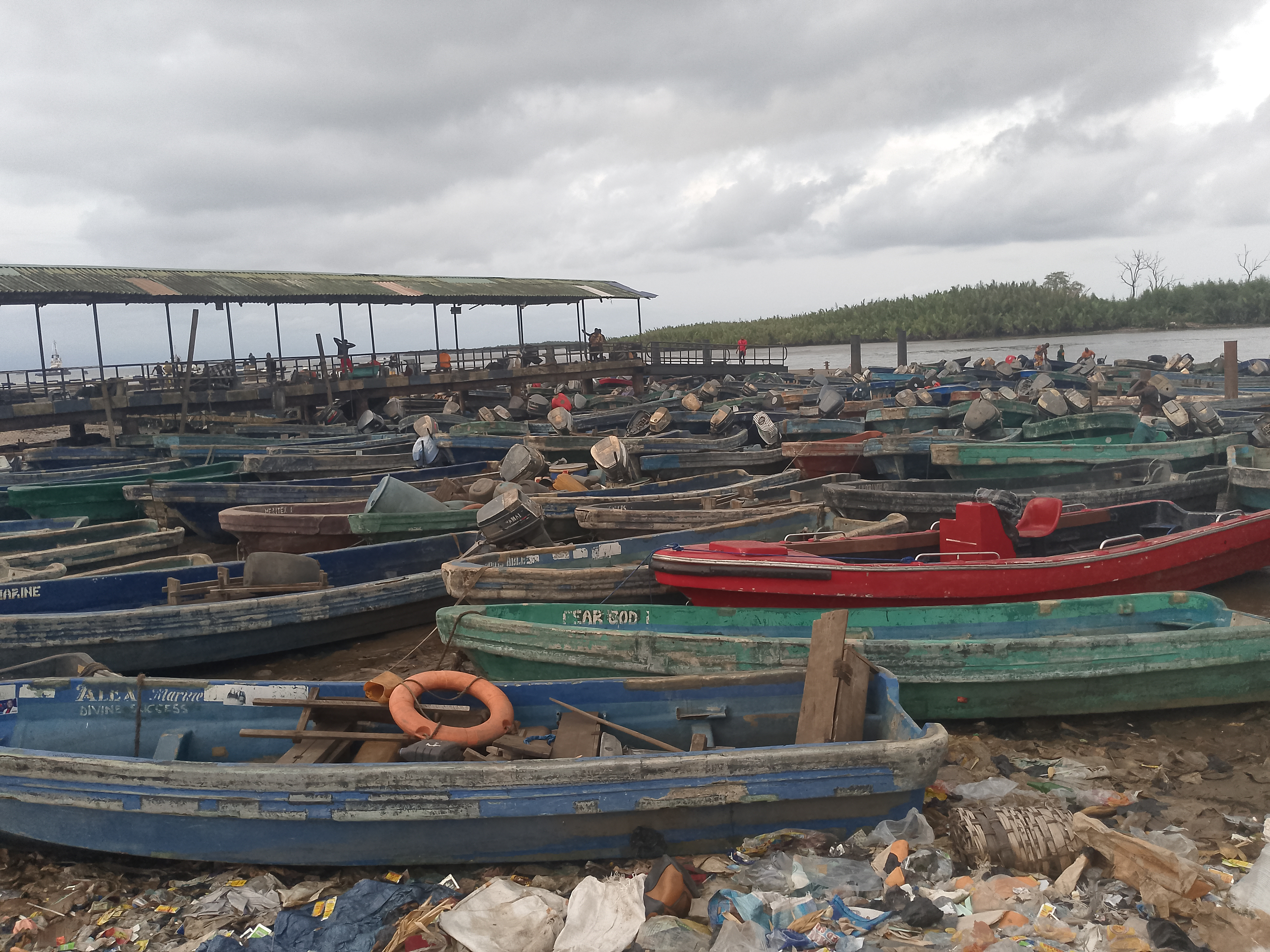
Passenger canoes at a local jetty in Bonny Island.

Bonny Island is surrounded on the west and south by long stretches of beaches. On 26 and 31 December of every year, thousands of people visit the Finima beaches for beach carnivals. There is also the Finima Nature Park, which is an important tourist area located at the right-hand side of the roundabout.
