= George Oruigbiji Pepple =

Ruler of the Kingdom of Bonny (1849–1888)

George Oruigbiji, otherwise known as Perekule VII, (c. 1849 – 31 October 1888) and variously known in England as Pepper, Pimento or Peppel/Pepple, (a name which he subsequently took) ruled the Kingdom of Bonny, an independent trading state in the Niger Delta between 30 September 1866 and 14 December 1883, when he was deposed. After the British signed a treaty making the state a protectorate, he was restored on 22 January 1887, ruling until his death.

== Background ==
The Kingdom of Bonny was a trading state founded before 1600, based on the port of Bonny in what is now Rivers State, Nigeria. It became a major trading center, first of slaves and later of palm oil products. During the 19th century, British influence was growing in the region. George Oruigbiji Pepple was born in 1849, son of King William Dappa Pepple of Bonny, who was deposed by the British and deported to Britain in 1854. George went into exile with his father, and was educated in England at the boys' school at Hall Place, Bexley in southeast London. His studies included English, Greek, Mathematics, Scripture and History, the conventional syllabus of Victorian England.

During his father's exile, Bonny was torn by struggles, at times violent, between two rival factions attached to the ruling house. The Manilla Pepple faction was led by Chief Oko Jumbo, but was racked by internal dissension. It was opposed by the Anna or Annie Pepple faction, led by Chief Jubo Jubogha, known as Ja-Ja to the British. In an attempt to restore peace, the British brought King William Dappa back and restored him to the throne in August 1861, reigning until his death in September 1866.

== First reign ==
George Pepple became king in succession to his father on 30 September 1866, taking the regnal name of Perekule VII. He was a Christian, and on his accession wrote to Bishop Crowther giving his support for introduction of the religion in Bonny. On 21 April 1867, supported by Oko Jumbo and other Manilla Pepple chiefs, he declared the iguana was no longer the sacred deity of the kingdom. His association with Christianity, at first welcomed by many people for the benefits it gave, gradually made him become identified with British interests and caused growing resentment.

The tension between the Manilla Pepple and Annie Pepple houses revived. In June 1867 there was a two-day skirmish between the factions, which King George managed to end by threatening to personally shoot the ringleaders. In 1869 a major battle between the two factions led to Ja-Ja founding a new state of Opobo, further inland at the village of Andoni, taking some of the palm oil trade away from Bonny. On 16 March 1870, George sailed for England, where he called for more forceful action by the British, a plea that was accepted. The British consul Livingston was supplied with a gunboat with which he sailed up the river to Andoni and imposed peace.

In 1879 George fell ill, and when he recovered took his doctor's advice to take a holiday in England. He was received well, his actions were reported in the press, and he was introduced to the Prince of Wales. He was also presented with a steam launch at the end of his visit. All this caused considerable alarm among the chiefs, concerned about his growing power, combined with the growing power of the British. He came close to being deposed on his return but was saved by the British consul. On 14 December 1883 King George was deposed.

== Restoration ==
In February 1886 a protectorate treaty was concluded between Bonny and Britain. A ruling council was established, and King George Pepple was restored to his throne. Oko Jumbo was publicly degraded, his bans on Christianity were repealed and afterwards he was a spent force in Bonny politics.

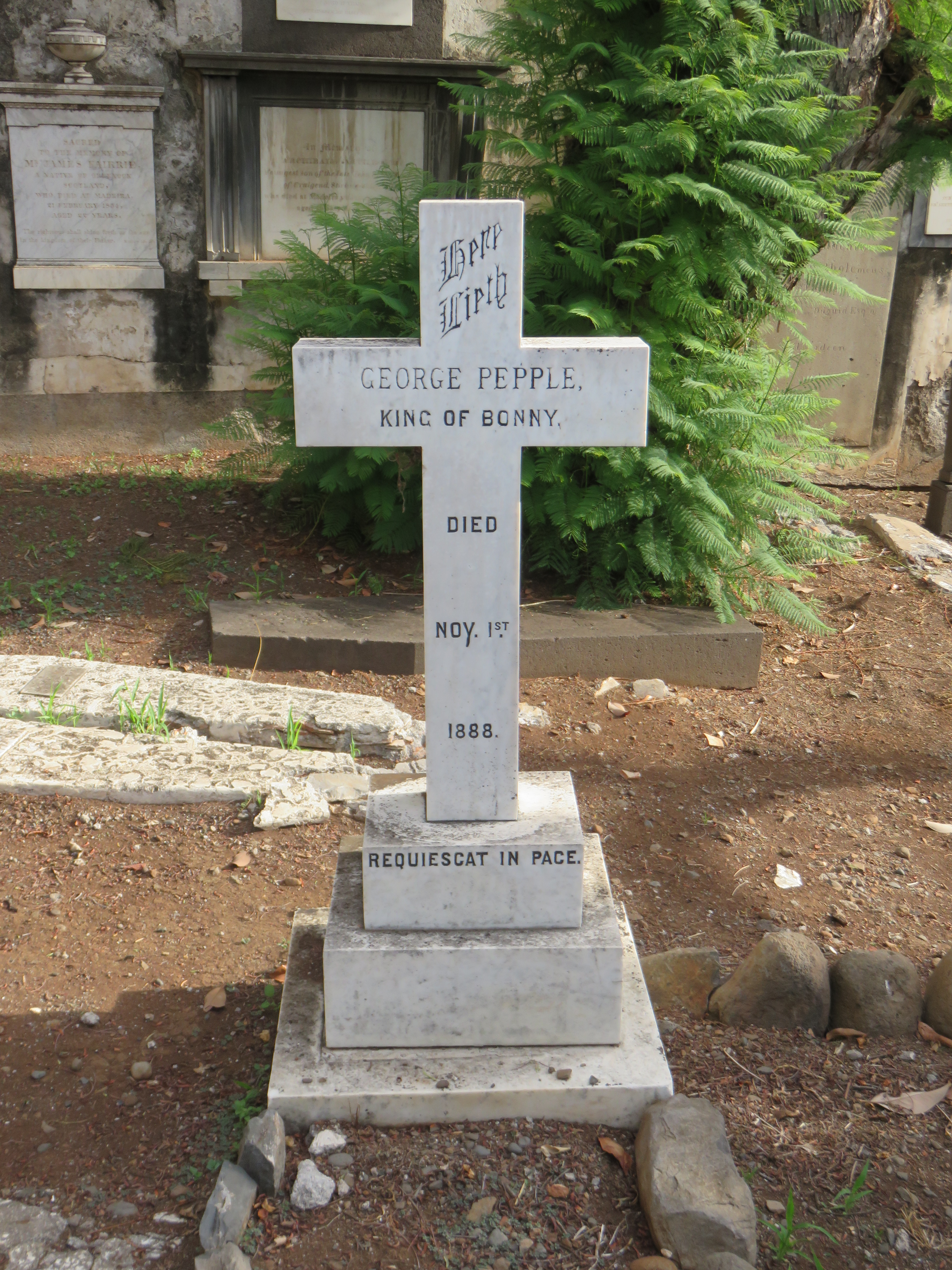
King George's grave in Madeira

King George died in October 1888, and was succeeded by a series of regents. He was buried in the British Cemetery of Funchal, Madeira. The cemetery today is administered and financed by the Anglican Holy Trinity Church, Rua Quebra Costa, Funchal, and has public access daily.
