= Dandeson Douglas Jaja =

Nigerian traditional ruler and the fifth King of the Opobo Kingdom

- Amanyanabo of Opobo
- Reign: 2004 - 2025
- Predecessor: Douglas Mac Pepple Jaja
- Successor: Charles Douglas MacPepple Jaja
- Born: 28 April 1942; Opobo, Rivers State, Nigeria
- Died: 31 December 2025 (aged 83)
- Spouse: Queen Prudence Dandeson Douglas Jaja
- House: Jaja royal family
- Father: Douglas Mac Pepple Jaja
- Mother: Queen Violet

King Dandeson Douglas Jaja, (Jeki V) (28 April 1942 - 31 December 2025), was a Nigerian traditional ruler who served as the fifth King (Amanyanabo) of the Opobo Kingdom in Rivers State. He served as chairman of the Rivers State Council of Traditional Rulers.

== Early life and personal life ==
King Dandeson Jaja was born on 28 April 1942 into the royal family of Opobo. He was the second child and second son of King Douglas Jaja, the Amanyanabo of Opobo, and Queen Violet. He was a great-grandson of Jaja of Opobo, the founder of the Opobo Kingdom.

He was married to Queen Prudence Dandeson Douglas Jaja.

== Education ==
King Jaja attended St. Paul's Primary School in Opobo Town before attending National Grammar School in Nike, Enugu. He had his tertiary education in the United Kingdom at Hull College of Higher Education, now part of the University of Lincoln's former higher-education lineage.

== Succession and kingship ==
Following the death of his father, King Douglas Jaja, on 31 July 1980, Dandeson Jaja was selected by the King Jaja Executive Authority as his father's successor while he was in Britain. He became Amanyanabo-elect of Opobo and head of the Jaja house.

His succession was challenged in a prolonged legal dispute concerning the customary procedures for selecting the Amanyanabo of Opobo. The dispute reached the Supreme Court of Nigeria, which in 2003 allowed the appeal involving Jaja and set aside the judgments of the lower courts. Following the resolution of the dispute, Jaja assumed the position of Amanyanabo of Opobo in 2004

== Traditional leadership ==
Jaja served as chairman of the Rivers State Council of Traditional Rulers. He was appointed to the position in 2015. He also served in the Southern Nigeria Council of Traditional Rulers.

== Death and funeral ==
King Dandeson Jaja died on 31 December 2025 at the age of 83. His funeral rites were held in April 2026 in Opobo Town.

He was succeeded by Charles Douglas MacPepple Jaja, who was elected Amanyanabo-elect in December 2025 and crowned as the sixth Amanyanabo of Opobo Kingdom on 26 September 2026.

== Award ==
In 2017, Jaja received the Nigerian national honour of Commander of the Order of the Federal Republic (CFR).

== See also ==
- Opobo Kingdom
- Jaja of Opobo
- Charles Douglas MacPepple Jaja
