= George Goodhead =

Ibani chief

Chief George Diepiriye Goodhead was a prominent Ibani chief.

== Background ==
George Goodhead was the eldest son of King Pepple I (Perekule) of the Kingdom of Bonny. He was noted as a child of King Perekule born out of wedlock. The George Goodhead house was initially known as Indian queen; as those were "two traders who ascended its chieftaincy."

It was common for house names to transform, often reflecting the signing of treaties by a chieftain. So, George Goodhead was earlier known as Indian queen, then Ukonu, George Goodhead and later Ukonu again, which was closely associated with King Opubo of Bonny during his lifetime, and was an ally and supporter of the Anna Pepple group (made up of more than 10 houses: Wariso, Kuke, George Goodhead (Ukonu), Iruanya (Uranta), Ibifa, Kiepirima (Toby), Epelle, Kala Ndassa, Tom Taylor, Wogu Dappa, Strongface etc.) against the Manila Pepple group in Bonny.

== Political relevance in the Grand Bonny Kingdom ==
Chief George Diepiriye Goodhead was a ranking leader of the Anna Pepple house and took an active part in maintaining the rulership of the King Pepple dynasty. He championed an ultimately unsuccessful attempt against the regency of Chief Maduka (Madu) in the mid 1830s; but was later imprisoned by Madu following a trade misunderstanding over collection of the comey the Europeans paid. During the travails of Chief Goodhead, Chief Omuso (Jack) Brown of Finima, who later led a successful coup against Maduka for William Dappa Pepple to assume the reins of Bonny leadership, rallied support for him. Goodhead has been expressly presented as very significant in the evolving politics between the Anna Pepple and Manila Pepple groups of houses in the ancient kingdom of Bonny, and was revered as rich and important, equal in status to both King Halliday and Chief Jack Brown during his time.^{[3]}

Goodhead was a signatory to the 23 January 1854 treaties, between Great Britain and the native princes and chiefs of the west coast of Africa, relating to commerce and the slave trade.

== Migration to Opobo (1870–1872) ==
Following a trade dispute and a civil war between Bonny and Opobo, and subsequent arbitration, on 3 January 1873 the chiefs of Bonny and Opobo signed a treaty under which "six markets on the Imo were assigned exclusively to Bonny, and all members and houses claimed by Jaja as part of the Anna Pepple group and who are still in Bonny were to be returned to Opobo. Most of them, for example Wariso and George Goodhead, had already made their way to Opobo, the most important remaining ones were Kuke (Cookey) and Oko Epelle and their people. Note that "Kuke had with George Goodhead sought asylum at Juju town (Finima)" during the great tussle between the Anna Pepple and Manila Pepple groups in Bonny."

Chief George Goodhead migrated and arrived Opobo between 1870 and 1872, soon after Jaja's arrival, and thus was amongst the fourteen out of the eighteen houses that left with Jaja from Bonny. Him and his family were therefore one of the foremost bands of settlers in what is currently Opubo-Kala-Ama (Opobo) in the new territory.

== Bibliography ==
- Jones, Gwilym Iwan. The Trading States of the Oil Rivers: a study of political development in eastern Nigeria. James Currey Publishers, 2000.
- The Political Economy of Nineteenth Century Bonny: A Study of Power, Authority, Legitimacy and Ideology in a Delta Trading Community, from 1790–1914, Volume 2 by Susan M. Hargreaves p. 66, 67, 153, 157, 188, 189, 191, 194, 198, 204, 206, 207, 208, 211, 216, 217, 299.
- A Chronicle of Grand Bonny by Ebriegberi J. Alagoa p. 108 & 112
- Forgotten heroes of Grand Bonny by Gentle Finapiri p. 58
