= Charles Douglas MacPepple Jaja =

Nigerian traditional ruler and the sixth king of the Opobo Kingdom

King Charles Douglas MacPepple Jaja
- Amanyanabo of Opobo Jeki VI
- Reign: 26 September 2026 – present
- Coronation: 26 September 2026
- Predecessor: Dandeson Douglas Jaja

King Charles Douglas MacPepple Jaja (Jeki VI) (born 1959), is a Nigerian traditional ruler and the sixth king of the Opobo Kingdom in Rivers State, Nigeria. He was elected as the Amanyanabo-elect in December 2025 following the death of his predecessor, Dandeson Douglas Jaja, and was crowned on 26 September 2026.

== Early life ==
King Charles was born in 1959 into the royal family of Opobo. Before his coronation, he was known as Alabo Prince Charles Douglas MacPepple Jaja.

== Coronation ==
King Charles Jaja was crowned on 26 September 2026 at King Jaja Square in Opobo Town, becoming the sixth Amanyanabo of Opobo Kingdom. He was crowned by Emmanuel Oko-Jaja, Bishop of the Niger Delta Diocese.

== See also ==
- Opobo Kingdom
- Dandeson Douglas Jaja
- Jaja of Opobo
- Ogiame Atuwatse III
- Obi of Onitsha
