= List of shipwrecks in July 1885 =

The list of shipwrecks in July 1885 includes ships sunk, foundered, grounded, or otherwise lost during July 1885.

== 1 July ==
List of shipwrecks: 1 July 1885
Ship	State	Description
Flossie	United Kingdom	The fishing boat was run into by the steamship Delta (United Kingdom) and sank off Pakefield, Suffolk. Her crew were rescued by Delta.
Gripen	Sweden	The barque was driven ashore at Dundalk, County Louth, United Kingdom. She was on a voyage from Doboy, Georgia, United States to Dundalk. She was refloated the next day.

== 3 July ==
List of shipwrecks: 3 July 1885
Ship	State	Description
Hawarden Castle	United Kingdom	The barque was damaged by an onboard explosion that killed a crew member and severely injured five others. She was on a voyage from Penarth, Glamorgan to Montevideo, Uruguay. She put in to Falmouth, Cornwall.

== 4 July ==
List of shipwrecks: 4 July 1885
Ship	State	Description
Abrota	United Kingdom	The steamship was driven ashore at Ljusne, Sweden.
Axel	Norway	The ship was driven ashore at Arkhangelsk, Russia.
Enigheden	Flag unknown	The ship was driven ashore at Arkhangelsk.
Iris	Flag unknown	The ship was driven ashore at Arkhangelsk.
Robert	Flag unknown	The ship was driven ashore at Arkhangelsk.

== 6 July ==
List of shipwrecks: 6 July 1885
Ship	State	Description
Dent Holme	United Kingdom	The steamship collided with the steamship Lake Champlain (United Kingdom) and sank at Matane, Quebec, Canada. Her crew was rescued. Dent Holme was on a voyage from Montreal, Quebec to Sydney, Nova Scotia, Canada.

== 8 July ==
List of shipwrecks: 8 July 1885
Ship	State	Description
Astoria	United States	The fishing schooner sank on the Grand Banks of Newfoundland. Her crew were rescued.

== 11 July ==
List of shipwrecks: 11 July 1885
Ship	State	Description
Colombo	United Kingdom	The steamship was wrecked on Scatterie Island, Nova Scotia, Canada. Her crew were rescued. She was on a voyage from "Coosaw" to Dublin.
E. D. Bigelow	United Kingdom	The barque was wrecked on the English Bank, in the River Plate. She was on a voyage from Liverpool, Lancashire to Montevideo, Uruguay.
Singapore	Italy	The steamship ran aground in the Suez Canal at "Raz Shukker", Egypt. She was refloated and taken in to Suez, Egypt.
Success	United Kingdom	The steamship ran aground on the Kalkbodengrund, in the Baltic Sea. She floated off and sank. Her crew survived. Success was on a voyage from Kronstadt, Russia to London.

== 13 July ==
List of shipwrecks: 13 July 1885
Ship	State	Description
Adele	Germany	The barque ran aground at "San Julian". She was on a voyage from Samarang, Netherlands East Indies to San Julian.
No. 1	United Kingdom	The hulk was severely damaged by fire at Gravesend, Kent.
Two unnamed vessels	Royal Navy	The torpedo boats ran aground between Island Davaar and the Argyllshire coast.

== 14 July ==
List of shipwrecks: 14 July 1885
Ship	State	Description
Raffaele Rubattino	Italy	The steamship was driven ashore at "Harat", Egypt. She was on a voyage from Bombay, India to Genoa.

== 15 July ==
List of shipwrecks: 15 July 1885
Ship	State	Description
Bertha	United Kingdom	The brigantine was run into by the steamship Penedo (United Kingdom) and sank in the River Thames downstream of Gravesend, Kent with the loss of five of her crew. The captain of Penedo was charged with manslaughter, but the Judge ruled there was no case to answer.
Quebec	Canada	The steamship wrecked and sank off St. Joseph Island, Ontario, on Lake Huron. Raised, repaired and returned to service in 1886.

== 16 July ==
List of shipwrecks: 16 July 1885
Ship	State	Description
Perkiomen	United States	The collier, a steamship, collided with the schooner Abbie C. Stubbs (United States) and sank 5 nautical miles (9.3 km; 5.8 mi) east of Monomoy Island, Massachusetts (41°34.934′N 069°53.309′W). Her fifteen crew survived. She was on a voyage from Philadelphia, Pennsylvania to Boston, Massachusetts. The wreck was later dispersed by explosives.

== 17 July ==
List of shipwrecks: 17 July 1885
Ship	State	Description
Furius	United Kingdom	The steamship ran aground on the Pedrido Reef, off A Coruña, Spain and was wrecked. Her eighteen crew survived. She was on a voyage from Algiers, Algeria to Leith, Lothian.

== 18 July ==
List of shipwrecks: 18 July 1885
Ship	State	Description
Sea Foam	United Kingdom	The fishing smack was run into by an Austro-Hungarian barque and sank off Waterford with the loss of two of her crew.

== 19 July ==
List of shipwrecks: 19 July 1885
Ship	State	Description
Bertie	United Kingdom	The steamship ran aground on the Towarteet Reef, 20 nautical miles (37 km) north of Souakin, Mahdist State. She was refloated on 21 July with assistance from the steamship Dilston Castle (United Kingdom) and taken in to Souakin.
Luigia Maddalena	Italy	The steamship ran aground at Tol-Pedn-Penwith, Cornwall, United Kingdom. Her crew survived. She was on a voyage from Havre de Grâce, Seine-Inférieure, France to Cardiff, Glamorgan, United Kingdom.

== 21 July ==
List of shipwrecks: 21 July 1885
Ship	State	Description
Cheerful	United Kingdom	The steamship was run down and sunk 19 nautical miles (35 km) north north west of St Ives, Cornwall by HMS Hecla (Royal Navy) with the loss of thirteen of the 49 people on board. Cheerful was on a voyage from Falmouth, Cornwall to Liverpool, Lancashire.

== 22 July ==
List of shipwrecks: 22 July 1885
Ship	State	Description
Agnes Otto	United Kingdom	The steamship was driven ashore in the Dardanelles at "Bulgar Deressi", Ottoman Empire. She was on a voyage from Malta to Constantinople, Ottoman Empire. She was refloated with the assistance of a number of tugs.
City of Amsterdam	United Kingdom	The steamship ran ashore on Lambay Island, County Dublin. She was on a voyage from Belfast, County Antrim to Dublin. She was refloated and resumed her voyage.
Flirt	United Kingdom	The yacht struck a submerged object and sank off Atherfield, Isle of Wight. Both crew survived.
Peter and Jane	United Kingdom	The fishing boat was run into by the steamship Mathvin (United Kingdom) and sank off the coast of Lothian. Her crew were rescued.
Zephyr, and an unnamed vessel	United Kingdom; Flag unknown	The yawl struck a sunken wreck and foundered 400 yards (370 m) south of the Cockle Lightship ( Trinity House) with the loss of eight of her fifteen crew. Those lost were lifeboatmen from Caister-on-Sea, Norfolk. Zephyr was going to the assistance of a schooner stranded on the Scroby Sands.

== 23 July ==
List of shipwrecks: 23 July 1885
Ship	State	Description
Corisco	United Kingdom	The cargo liner was wrecked at the mouth of the River Cess, Liberia. All on board, including King Oko Jumbo of Bonny, were rescued.
Maggie Blanche	United States	The fishing schooner was lost off Miquelon. Her crew were rescued.
Strathadder	United Kingdom	The steamship was driven ashore at "Orlock", County Down. She was on a voyage from Troon, Ayrshire to Belfast, County Antrim. She was refloated the next day and towed in to Belfast.

== 26 July ==
List of shipwrecks: 26 July 1885
Ship	State	Description
Victoria	Sweden	The steamship was driven ashore 25 nautical miles (46 km) from Raz Ghareb, Egypt. She was on a voyage from Cardiff, Glamorgan, United Kingdom to Singapore, Straits Settlements. She was refloated and taken in to Suez, Egypt in a leaky condition.

== 28 July ==
List of shipwrecks: 28 July 1885
Ship	State	Description
Coquet Island	United Kingdom	The lighter sank off Amble, Northumberland with the loss of two of her crew. Survivors were rescued by the tug Pactolus (United Kingdom).

== 31 July ==
List of shipwrecks: 31 July 1885
Ship	State	Description
Excellensen Sibbern	Sweden	The ship departed from Santa Ana, California, United States for Falmouth, Cornwall or Queenstown, County Cork, United Kingdom. No further trace, reported missing.

== Unknown date ==
List of shipwrecks: Unknown date in July 1885
Ship	State	Description
Alma	Norway	The ship was driven ashore at Majorenhof, Russia. Her crew were rescued. She was on a voyage from Amsterdam, North Holland, Netherlands to Riga, Russia.
Amstel	Netherlands	The ship ran aground on the Corea Shoal. She was later refloated and taken in to Samarang, Netherlands East Indies, where she arrived on 29 July in a leaky condition and was beached.
Anna	United States	The ship was driven ashore at Sea Bright, New Jersey. She was on a voyage from Aracaju, Brazil to New York. She was refloated.
Baines Hawkins	United Kingdom	The steamship was driven ashore on Terschelling, Friesland, Netherlands. She was refloated and resumed her voyage.
Cairnsmuir	United Kingdom	The steamship was driven ashore on the west coast of Tiree, Inner Hebrides. Her crew were rescued. She was on a voyage from Hamburg, Germany to Glasgow, Renfrewshire.
Catterina Schiaffino	United Kingdom	The ship arrived at Livorno on fire and was scuttled. She was on a voyage from Hull, Yorkshire, United Kingdom to Livorno.
Cilurnum	United Kingdom	The steamship ran aground on the Monsciar Reef, Malta. She was on a voyage from Newport, Monmouthshire to Bombay, India.
Florence	United Kingdom	The steamship was driven ashore at Uyeasound, Shetland Islands.
Hebe	Germany	The brig was wrecked at Saint Thomas, Virgin Islands. Her crew were rescued.
India	Italy	The steamship collided with the steamship Achilles (United Kingdom) and was severely damaged.
Juana	Spain	The steamship ran aground in the Clyde near Greenock, Renfrewshire. She was on a voyage from Bilbao to Greenock. She was refloated on 20 July and resumed her voyage.
Malaga	Sweden	The steamship was driven ashore at Falhead, Gotland. She was on a voyage from Riga, Russia to Stettin, Geramany.
Marchioness of Anglesea	United Kingdom	The schooner foundered in the Irish Sea 10 nautical miles (19 km) off Castletown, Isle of Man. Her four crew survived. She was on a voyage from Caernarfon to Hartlepool, County Durham.
Midlothian	United Kingdom	The steamship ran aground at Swansea, Glamorgan. She was on a voyage from Swansea to Kronstadt, Russia. She was refloated on 22 July but ran aground again. She was refloated on 23 July and resumed her voyage.
Ngan Kin	China	The steamship was driven ashore near Hankou (Hankow). She was refloated with the assistance of three steamships on 7 July.
Perseverance	United Kingdom	The ketch was beached at Sandown, Isle of Wight, where she became a wreck. Her crew were rescued. She was on a voyage from Havre de Grâce, Seine-Inférieure, France to Plymouth, Devon.
Sigurd	Sweden	The schooner foundered in the Baltic Sea. There were some survivors. She was on a voyage from Hartlepool, County Durham, United Kingdom to Skellefteå.
Slite	Sweden	The ship was driven ashore at "Djiersten".
Willie	Sweden	The steamship was driven ashore at "Hvalsnas", Öland.
