= Goodhead =

Goodhead is a surname. Notable people with the surname include:

- Boma Goodhead (born 1970), Nigerian politician
- George Goodhead (fl. 1830s–1870s), Ibani chief
- Thomas Goodhead (born 1982), British barrister

== Fictional ==
- Holly Goodhead, fictional character from the James Bond franchise
