= Ibani tribe =

Nigerian ethnic group

The Ibani/Ubani people are indigenous Ijaw people who live in Bonny and Opobo areas of Rivers State, Nigeria.

Bonny town is the tribal seat of the Ibani, and is located on the bight of Bonny River. Bonny's development was significantly shaped by the tribe's close interaction with European traders from the 15th century to the 18th century.

== History ==
The Kingdom of Bonny was a major trading centre from the 16th century onwards. They traded in ivory, elephant teeth and spices before they became major players in the trans-atlantic slave trade. Its people were later known for the exportation of palm oil and palm kernel. The indigenes of the Bonny and Opobo kingdoms are collectively known as the Ibani people.

== Wars ==
Historically, Bonny engaged in several wars against its nearby rivals, such as Elem Kalabari, the Obolo and the Andoni.
