= Anglican Diocese of Niger Delta West =

Anglican diocese in Nigeria

The Anglican Diocese of Niger Delta West is one of ten within the Anglican Province of the Niger Delta, itself one of 14 ecclesiastical provinces within the Church of Nigeria. The current bishop is Emmanuel Oko-Jaja. The second bishop of the diocese, Oko-Jaja was consecrated a bishop on February 21, 2010 at St Paul's Cathedral, Diobu, Port Harcourt.
