= Valentine Manilla Pepple =

Chief in the Kingdom of Bonny

Chief Waripanye Valentine Manilla Pepple (born November 8, 1967) is a Nigerian lawyer, stockbroker, clergyman and traditional aristocrat. As Fubara XV, he currently serves as the alabo of the aristocratic Fubara Manilla Pepple chieftaincy house of Bonny.
