= Amal Pepple =

Nigerian politician

Princess Amal Inyingiala Pepple CFR

Minister of Lands, Housing and Urban Development
- In office July 2011 – 2013
- President: Goodluck Jonathan

Head of the Civil Service of the Federation
- In office 16 June 2008 – June 2009

Personal details
- Born: 16 June 1949 (age 77) Bonny Island, Rivers State, Nigeria
- Education: Political Science
- Occupation: Civil servant, politician

Princess Amal Iyingiala Pepple C.F.R. is a Nigerian politician and civil servant. She was the minister of Housing, Land and Urban Development of the Federal Republic of Nigeria in the Jonathan Administration. Prior to June 2009, she was also the head of the Civil Service.

== Life ==
Amal Inyingiala Pepple was born on June 16, 1949, to the Perekule dynasty, the royal family of Grand Bonny on Bonny Island in Rivers State. She attended Archdeacon Crowther Memorial Girls' School Elelenwa, Port Harcourt, Nigeria for her O Levels and proceeded to the College of Further Education, Bath Lane, Newcastle-Upon Tyne, England for her A Levels. After her A Levels, she proceeded to the University of Ile-Ife, Nigeria for university education where she read Political Science and graduated with first class honours. In 1981, she acquired her Master of Science Degree from the School of Oriental and African Studies, University of London, U.K. She did her Youth Service in NBC, Port Harcourt and then began her working career as a lecturer in Political Science at the Rivers State College of Education.

In 1992, she was appointed the Clerk of the Senate of the National Assembly, where she began her Federal Civil Service career. She meritoriously served in the Federal Civil Service, culminating in her being appointed as a Permanent Secretary in 1999. She served in that capacity in several Ministries, such as the Federal Civil Service Commission, Ministry of Transport, Ministry of Information and National Orientation, Ministry of Petroleum Resources, Ministry of Commerce, Ministry of Agriculture and Rural Development and Ministry of Finance. While serving in these Ministries, she held the following positions: Governor of OPEC for Nigeria, Governor Common Fund for Commodities, Alternate Governor International Fund for Agricultural Development (IFAD), Governor OPEC fund for International Development, Alternate Governor Islamic Development Bank, Alternate Governor African Development Bank, Alternate Governor International Monetary Fund. She was also a board member of the Commonwealth Association for Public Administration and Management (CAPAM), a director in Zenith PLC and a director in Oando PLC until her ministerial appointment.

On 16 June 2008, she was appointed the Head of the Civil Service of the Federation. She is an awardee of the National Honour of Commander of the Federal Republic of Nigeria (CFR). As a reward for excellence and dedicated service to her fatherland, the President of the Federal Republic of Nigeria, Dr. Goodluck Ebele Jonathan, found her worthy and appointed her a minister of the Government of the Federal Republic of Nigeria in July 2011 and assigned her the portfolio of the Honourable Minister of Lands, Housing and Urban Development.

Prior to joining the Government, Pepple served as administrative secretary of the Social Democratic Party, Rivers State. She has also been Director of the Federal Civil Service and Director of the Economic Affairs Office in the Presidency as well as Permanent Secretary in the following Federal Ministries: Civil Service Commission, Transport, Information and National Orientation, Petroleum Resources, Commerce, Agriculture and Water Resources and Finance.
