= King Jaja of Opobo Memorial =

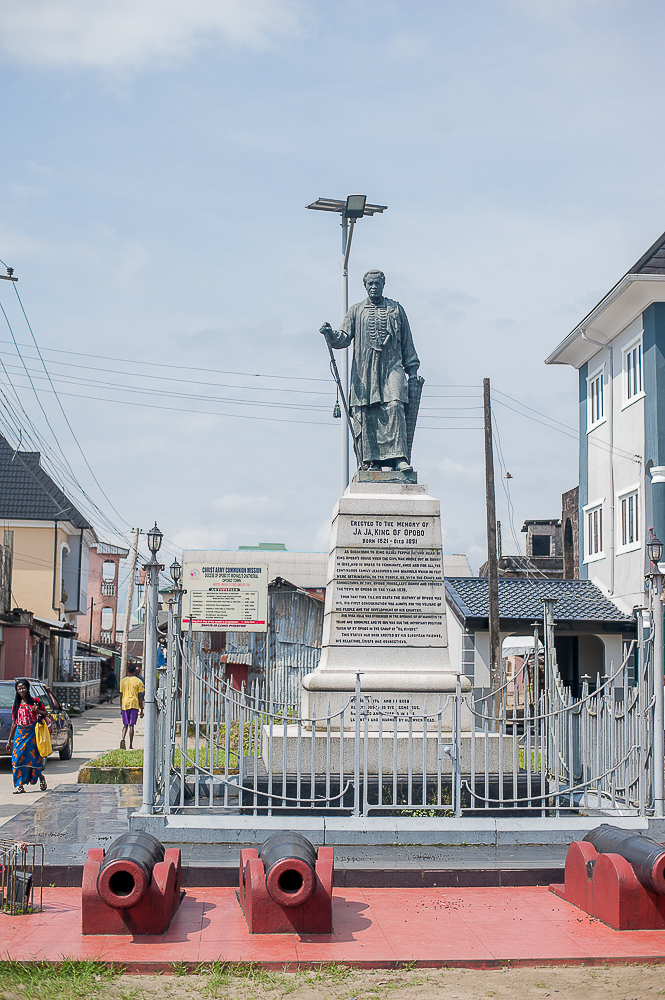
- Interactive map of King Jaja of Opobo Memorial
- Location: Opobo (Nigeria)
- Coordinates: 4.514107°N 7.538879°E
- Type: Monument
- Material: Bronze and grey granite
- Opening date: 1903
- Dedicated to: King Jaja of Opobo

The King Jaja of Opobo Memorial is a bronze monument in memory of King Jaja of Opobo, erected by public subscription in 1903. It was listed as being of special architectural, historical or cultural significance by the National Commission for Museums and Monuments on 14 August 1959.

== Description ==
It is located within the Opobo town centre and bears an inscription in the English language, which reads:

A king in title and indeed.
Always just and ever generous.
Respected and revered in life.
Lamented and mourned by all when dead.

The statue stands on a grey granite plinth, surrounded by cast iron railings. The grass around is close-growing with neatly-cut edges, giving the dignified appearance of a public park.

== Gallery ==
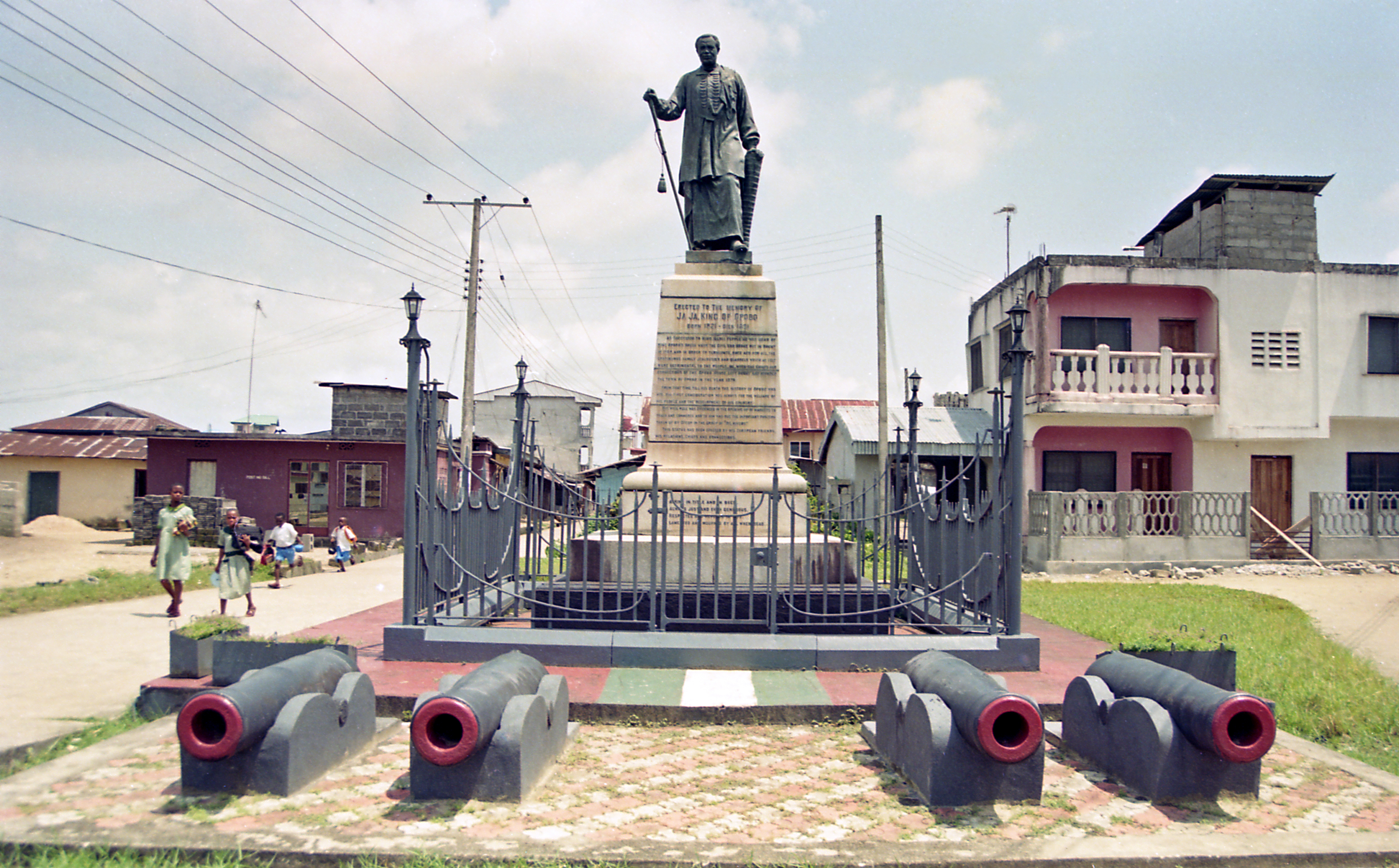

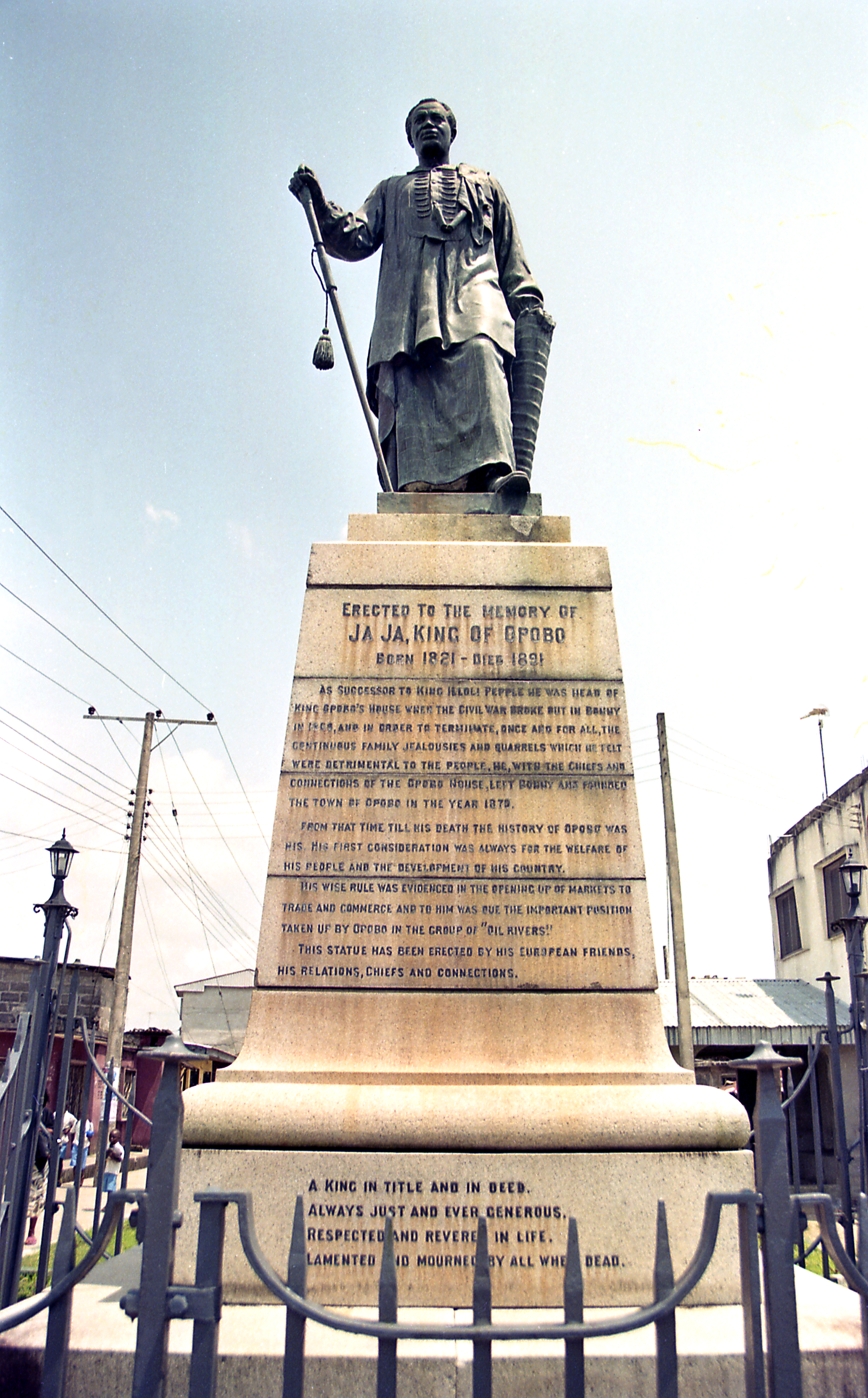

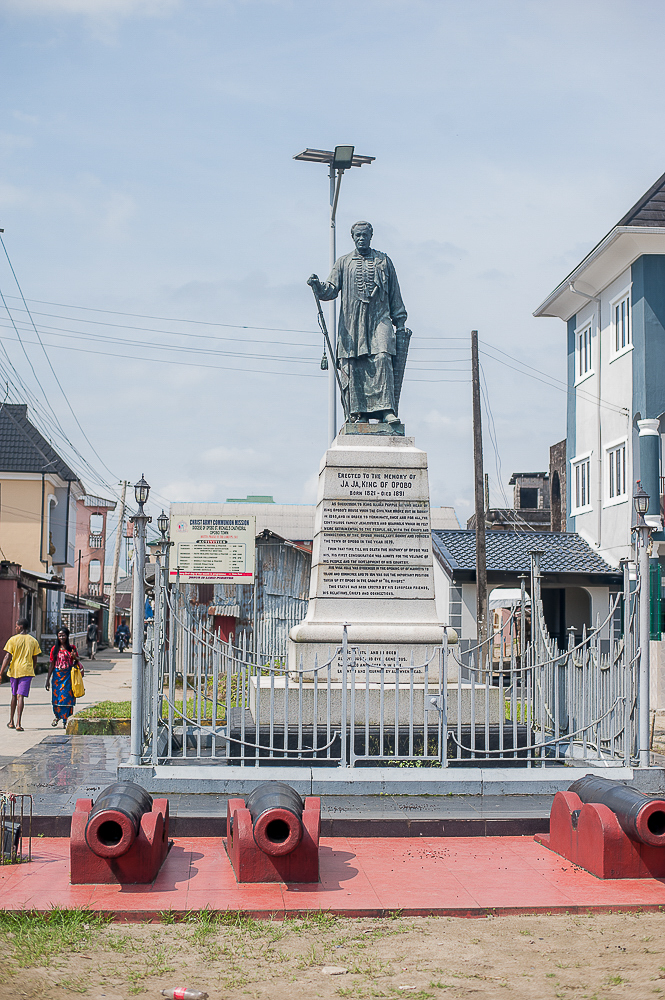

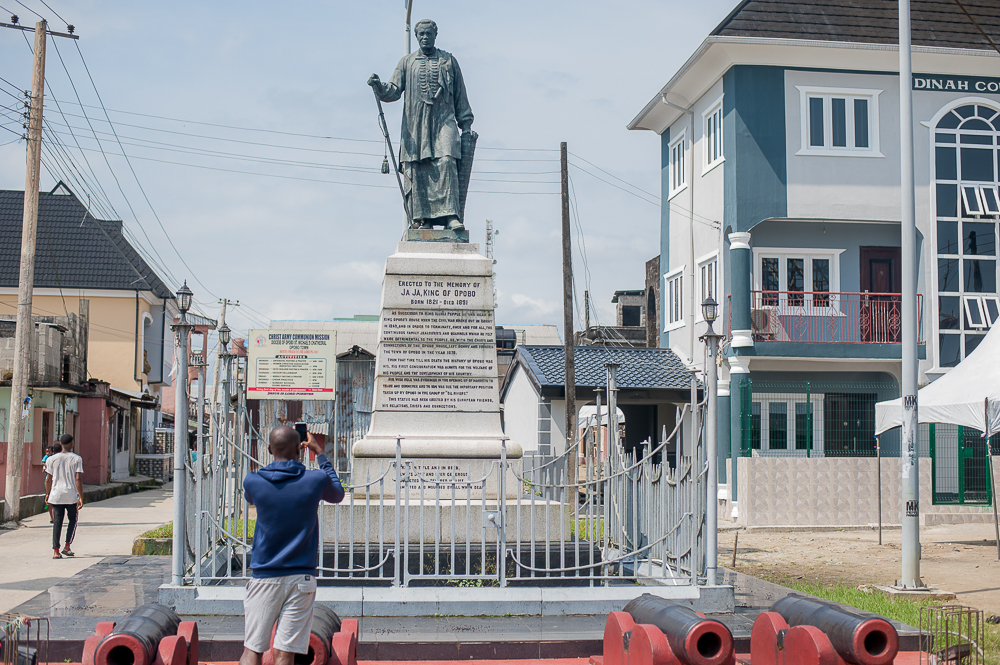

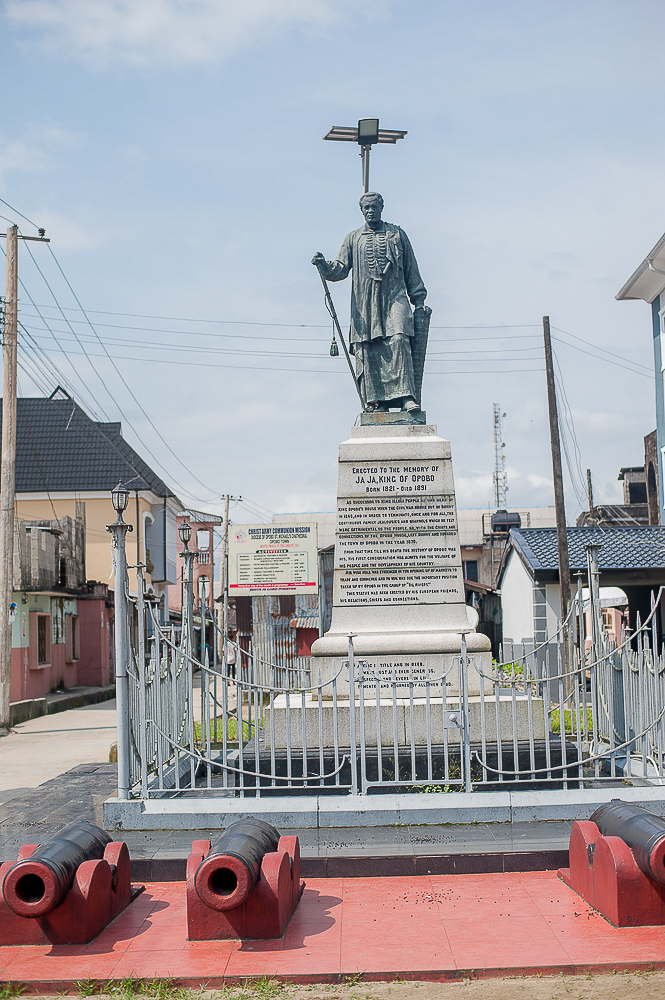
