= Anglican Diocese of Ikwerre =

Anglican diocese in Nigeria

The Anglican Diocese of Ikwerre is one of eighteen dioceses within the Anglican Province of the Niger Delta, itself one of 14 ecclesiastical provinces within the Church of Nigeria. The current bishop is the Right Rev. Blessing Enyindah. Enyindah was consecrated a bishop on April 18, 2007, at the Cathedral of the Good Shepherd, Enugu; the diocese was inaugurated on April 20, and Enyindah later became Archbishop of Niger Delta Province on July 11, 2021, and Dean Church of Nigeria in September, 2024.
