= Blessing Enyindah =

Anglican bishop in Nigeria

Blessing Enyindah is the Anglican Bishop of Ikwerre, Archbishop of Niger Delta Province and Dean of the Church of Nigeria, Anglican Communion.

He was elected in 2007 as the first Bishop of Ikwerre.
