= Oko Jumbo =

Chief in the Kingdom of Bonny

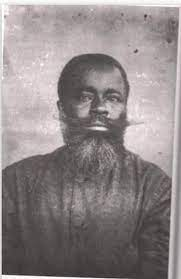
Jumbo in 1890

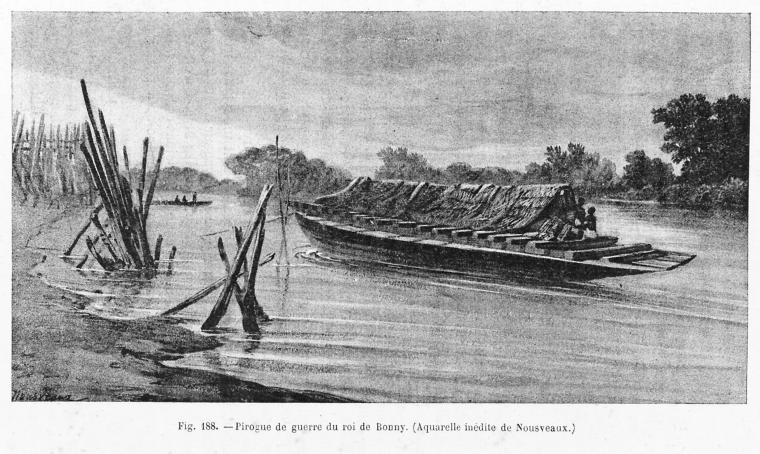
Royal Canoe of the Kingdom of Bonny, 1890

Chief Oko Jumbo (died 1891) was a chief in the Kingdom of Bonny. Originally of Igbo origin, Chief Jumbo rose through the ranks in the Kingdom of Bonny, a state in the Niger Delta, now part of Rivers State, Nigeria. For many years in the 19th century, he was the effective ruler of Bonny. Though not the king in Bonny, and Warribo was the technical head of the Fubara Manilla Pepple House, "Oko Jumbo and Ja Ja were looked upon by every one as being the rulers of Bonny".

== Background ==
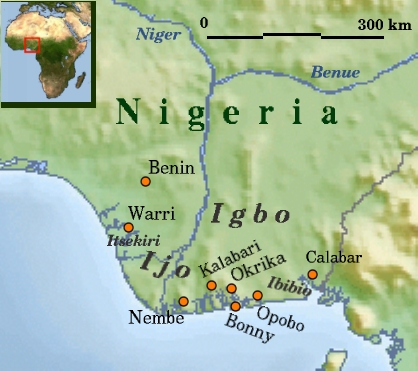
Ijaw trading states. Bonny on southern coast.

The Kingdom of Bonny, originally called Ibani or Ubani, is a traditional state based on the town of Bonny in Rivers State, Nigeria. The kingdom was inhabited by the Ijo.

Bonny rose to power beginning in the 15th century with the coming of the Portuguese and the Atlantic slave trade, acting as a depot for slaves brought from the interior. In the 19th century, the kingdom was forced by the British to end the slave trade. Trade in palm oil replaced the trade in slaves.

== Early career ==
Jumbo was a freed slave who became a lesser chief in Bonny, but managed to amass considerable wealth and thus power through astute trading. He became one of the leaders of a group of chiefs who dominated the ruling Manilla Pepple house. On the death of King Dappa of Bonny on 13 August 1855, the acting British Consul in the Bight of Biafra, J.W.B. Lynslager, signed a document on 11 September 1855 appointing the chiefs Anne Pepple, Ada Allison, Captain Hart and Manilla Pepple as a regency, required to consult with Banigo and Jumbo, "two gentlemen of the river".

The arrangement, which gave the Manilla Pepple house control of the regency, caused immediate disputes with the rival Anna (or Annie) Pepple house. When Lynslager's replacement arrived, he reported that "the four regents never lived in unity or unanimity ... consequently civil war was ever ripe around and about them... leading to immense loss of British property". When the official leader of the Manilla house died in 1863, Banigo and Jumbo could not agree who was to succeed, and so appointed a figurehead named Warribo while continuing to control the house. In an attempt to restore calm, the British restored William Dappa Pepple I (whom they had exiled in 1854) as king on 18 August 1861, and on his death on 30 September 1866 installed his son George Oruigbiji Pepple as king. Jumbo remained a leading power in the kingdom.

On 6 March 1866, Bishop Crowther described Jumbo as the "most sensible and wealthy" man in Bonny, and noted that he had learned to read the first chapter of St. Matthew. The next year he had learned to write, and enrolled thirteen of his children in school. He gave his support to the Christian missionaries, and on Easter Day 1867 joined King George in declaring that the Monitor Lizard, the traditional deity of Bonny, was no longer "Bonny Juju".

== Civil war ==
Tension continued between the Manilla Pepple house and the Annie Pepple house, which was led by a chief named Jubo Jubogha, known as Jaja to the British. A truce was agreed in 1865, banning the use of firearms, but on 2 March 1867 a brawl between Manilla Pepple and Anna Pepple supporters engulfed the town, with all the men fighting on one side or other using "matchets and gin bottles, there being no stone in the town". The young King George intervened, armed with a pistol, and managed to calm things down.

In 1869, after Jaja had decided to relocate outside the city, the dispute flared up into civil warfare, in which the Manilla Pepples gained the advantage through acquisition of some old 32 lb carronades. Many of the Annie Pepple supporters were killed during and in the aftermath of the main battle, and the town was devastated. Jaja left Bonny and established a rival settlement at Opobo, which controlled the river that supplied three-quarters of the palm oil of the district. The British trading firm of Stuart & Douglas supported Jaja, as did others, who relocated to Opobo.

== Later years ==
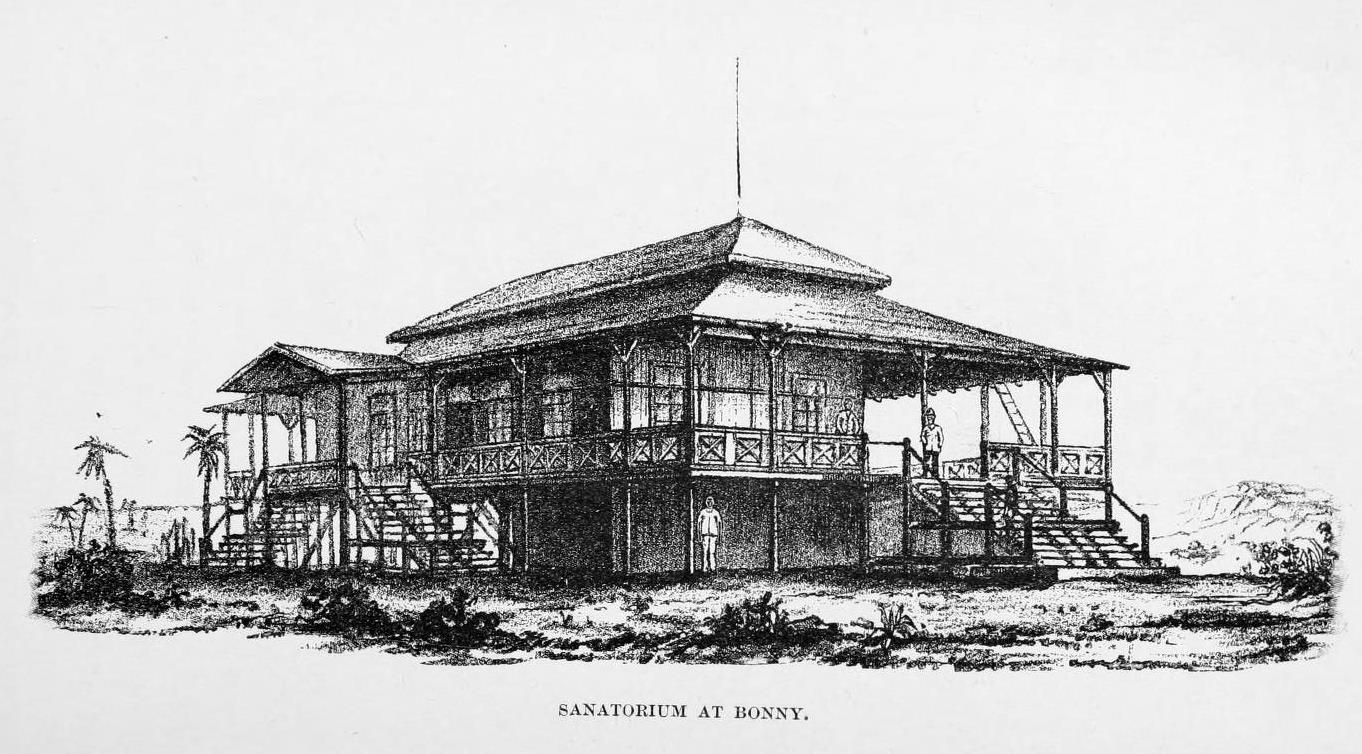
European sanatorium at Bonny, 1885.

A peace treaty was concluded between Bonny and Opobo in 1873, and Jumbo visited Jaja and assured him of his friendship. Jumbo soured against Christianity when he realised that King George was using the influence of the missionaries to undermine the power of the chiefs and increase his own influence. He imposed various bans on the practice of the religion. In 1879, King George visited England, where he was well received, given great attention in the press and presented with a steam launch. These reports alarmed Jumbo and Jaja, who became concerned that the British were planning to annexe both Bonny and Opobo, although on George's return the British consul managed to calm the situation down. On 14 December 1883 the chiefs deposed King George Pepple.

The friendship between Jumbo and Jaja broke down, and both began arming. An 1883 book said that "Jumbo has under his command some 7,000 or 8,000 men, all armed with breech-loading rifles and well supplied with ammunition; and Ja-Ja can put about the same number, similarly armed, into the field". In 1884, Jumbo fell out with the other chiefs in Bonny. There were rumours that he wanted to place one of his sons on the throne, although a planned coup attempt in January 1885 came to nothing. Another son, Herbert Jumbo, who had been educated in England, quarrelled with his father and placed himself under the protection of the British consul.

Later in 1885, Jumbo made a trip to England, arriving in Liverpool in May accompanied by two of his sons, Herbert and James. The Times described him as "King of Bonny" when reporting the visit. On his return trip, the ship Corisco he was travelling on was wrecked at the mouth of the River Cess, Liberia, but he managed to escape. In February 1886, a protectorate treaty was concluded between Bonny and Britain. A ruling council was established, and King George Pepple was reestablished on his throne. Jumbo was publicly degraded, his bans on Christianity were repealed and afterwards he was a spent force in Bonny politics. In June 1886, refuting rumours that Jumbo had drowned in the shipwreck, a reporter said he had retired 40 miles into the interior, leaving all his affairs in the hands of his son Herbert. In 1887, Jaja was arrested and exiled to Tenerife, dying there in 1891, and his old rival Jumbo died around the same time.

== Appearance ==
In John Whitford's book on the region published in 1877, Jumbo was described as "about forty-five years of age, slightly above the middle stature, well built, inclined to portliness; and has bright sparkling eyes and an intelligent face". He was described as an elegant dresser, although preferred bare feet. He travelled in a long, fast canoe paddled by twenty four to thirty boys. He was hospitable, and often invited white men to share his excellent cookery. An account published after his fall in 1886 described him as "a grand old pagan of the bygone school, tall and strong, with a fine handsome face and powerful head, with very little attempt at European dress, or indeed dress of any sort". It noted that his two sons, who resided mostly in England, were civilised gentlemen.
