= Fubara Manilla Pepple =

Nigerian monarch and chieftaincy family

Fubara I Agbaa Pepple II

Amanyanabo of Bonny
- Reign: 1754–1792
- Coronation: 1754
- Predecessor: Perekule I Pepple
- Successor: Opubo Pepple III
- Born: Bonny
- Burial: Bonny
- House: Perekule Pepple
- Father: Perekule I

Fubara Manilla Pepple, otherwise known as Fubara I Agbaa Pepple II, was a Nigerian monarch. He was the ruler of the Kingdom of Bonny from 1754 to 1792.

Both his lineal and adoptive descendants—who are all collectively known today as the House of Fubara Manilla Pepple—serve by tradition as one of Bonny's most powerful chieftaincy families.

House Symbology

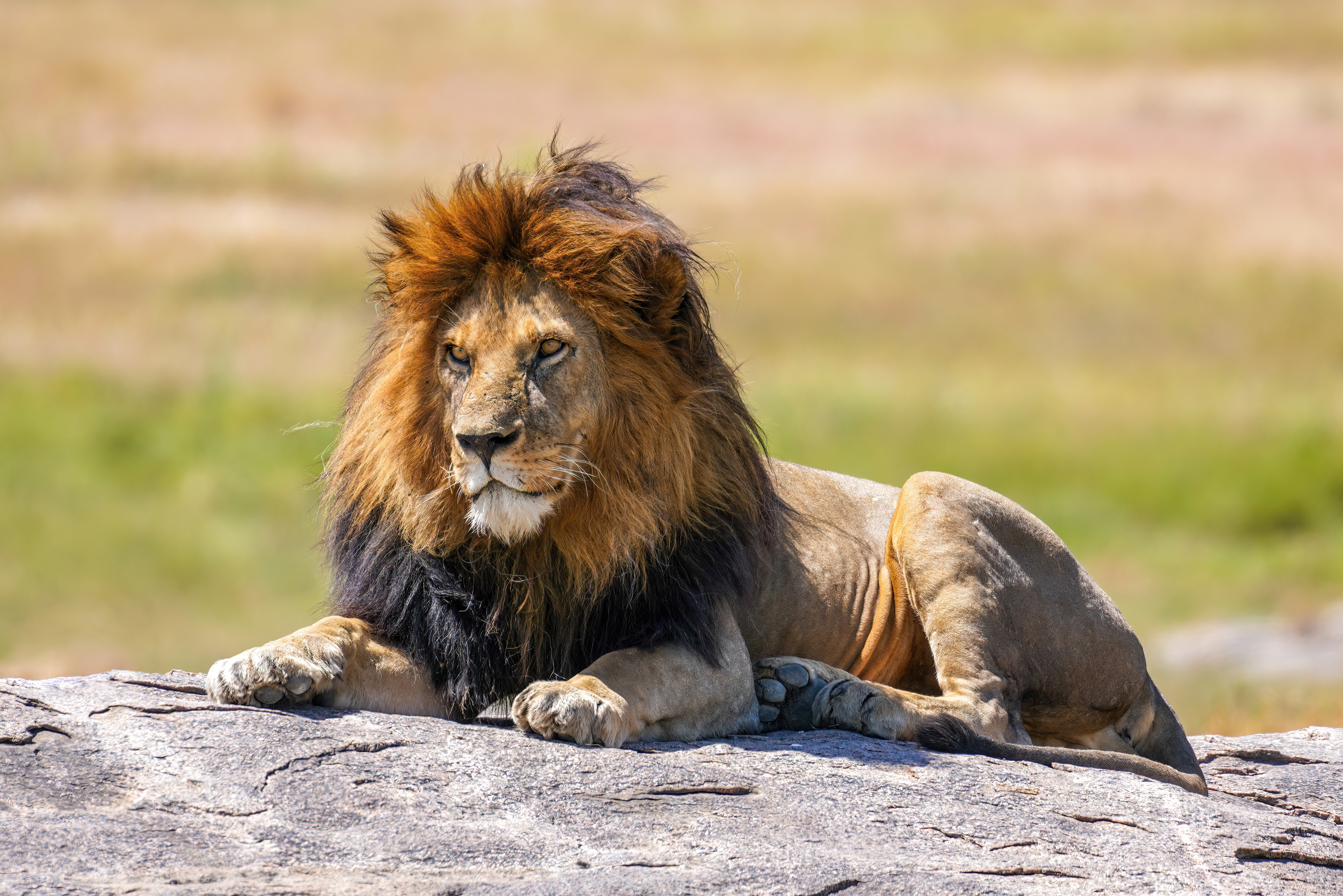
The Lion, totem of the god of justice Egbesu and heraldic beast of the House of Fubara Manilla Pepple.

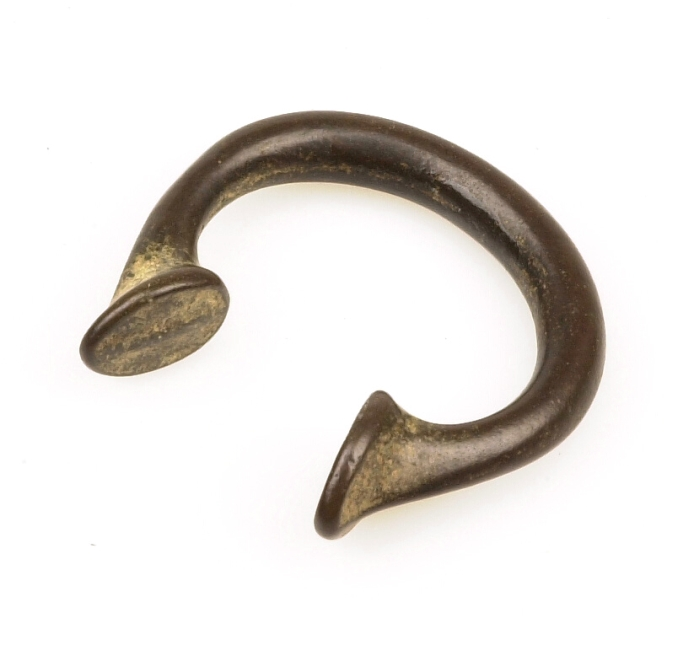
A Manilla, currency in early Nigerian trade, heraldic charge of the house and namesake of its founder.

== Succession ==
The second son of King Perekule I Pepple, Fubara wasn't initially expected to succeed him as ruler. His elder brother, Ibulu Best Pepple, was their father's acknowledged heir, but in the lead up to his death he was found to be somewhat weak-willed. As a result, upon Perekule's death, Ibulu was sidelined by the elders and Fubara was called upon to take up the kingship thereafter. He was crowned in 1754.

== Reign ==
House of Fubara Manilla Pepple
- Parent family: Perekule Pepple
- Country: Nigeria
- Current region: Niger Delta
- Founded: ca. 1754
- Founder: King Fubara I Agbaa Pepple II
- Current head: Chief Waripanye Valentine Manilla Pepple (Fubara XV)
- Seat: Bonny
- Historic seat: Kingdom of Bonny
- Titles: • Alabo • Wariopusenibo • Warisenibo • Apaosenibo • Amasenibo
- Styles: • High Chief • Chief • Titled citizen
- Connected members: Oko Jumbo
- Connected families: • George Pepple lineage • Perekule Pepple house • Jaja lineage • Opobo Annie Pepple house •Oko Jumbo house
- Traditions: • Ijaw traditional religion • Christianity
- Motto: Apulama Na Ogebule kobo tonogha, Obie guru guru, Obie bere; Enefindi Berefindi.

In emulation of what was customary amongst the lower classes, Fubara's own position as a chief prior to his accession was only recognized because of his prior rule of the Fubara Manilla Pepples - a clan corporation that was partly based on kinship, and partly on initiatory fealty. Each independent elder in Bonny aspired to the headship of such an entity - termed a House - and by the end of the civil war of 1869, Bonny was composed of no fewer than eighteen of them. Each house existed almost solely for profit, and each house chief was therefore in an almost constant state of competition with his titled rivals.

Perekule had seen to it that each of his sons had been provided with a house of his own during his reign. By the point when Fubara himself died in 1792, the Fubara Manilla Pepples were the largest and most successful of these cadet branches of the wider Perekule Pepple dynasty. This was largely due to the fact that Fubara left the stewardship of his house in the hands of an able regent, the ex-slave Ibanibufuria. Chief Ibanibufuria used the king's patronage to consolidate the gains made in the time of Perekule I. He established a virtual monopoly of the slave trade in the kingdom, and subsequently founded satellite sub-houses that were to be headed by men like him: freed slaves that had risen through the ranks of Bonny society due to hard work and ability.

While this was going on, Fubara - who operated in business dealings with visiting European traders under the trade name Manilla Pepple - worked to balance trade and maintain order in the state. This latter aim wasn't always achieved, partly due to the fact that the king - far from being a neutral arbitrator in the house chiefs' squabbles - was himself an active participant in the trade that invariably caused them. This loss of royal neutrality had begun under Perekule, and had been compounded by his establishment of both the Fubara Manilla Pepple house and the Opubo Annie Pepple house of Fubara's younger brother (and eventual successor) Opubo.

== Death and legacy ==
Fubara I died in 1792, and was succeeded by Opubo in the same year. The new king continued the official policy of bolstering his own position that had been the hallmark of his brother's reign, consolidating the twin powers of both the kingship and the Opubo Annie Pepple house in the process. He used the glory of his reign - something of a golden age in Bonny - to radically undermine the ascendancy of the other houses.

By the time that the Fubara Manilla Pepple regent Ibanibufuria was succeeded by his adopted son Chief Iringeresibo, a civil rupture seemed guaranteed. Upon Opubo's death, it was only averted by the declaration of war by the Andoni people in 1843. Iringeresibo led the Bonny forces as a war chief in that engagement, and ultimately lost his life during the fighting.

The personalization of power in the royal houses in this way by the first three Pepple kings would ultimately lead to the civil war between the Fubara Manilla Pepples - led at the time by the famous chief Oko Jumbo - and the Opubo Annie Pepples, who were themselves then led by the even more famous Chief Jaja. Upon losing the war, Jaja would lead his supporters in seceding from Bonny. The independent settlement that they founded eventually became known as Opobo.

Today, the Fubara Manilla Pepple chieftaincy family has a status in Bonny that is second only to that of the Perekule Pepple ruling house itself. Its current chief, Valentine Manilla Pepple, is the fourteenth successor to Fubara I's title.

== See also ==
- Kingdom of Bonny
