= Emmanuel Oko-Jaja =

Anglican bishop in Nigeria

Emmanuel Oko-Jaja is an Anglican bishop in Nigeria: he is the current Bishop of Niger Delta Diocese one of nine in the Anglican Province of the Niger Delta, itself one of 14 within the Church of Nigeria.
