= Bonny, Nigeria =

Bonny Okoloama
- City and LGA
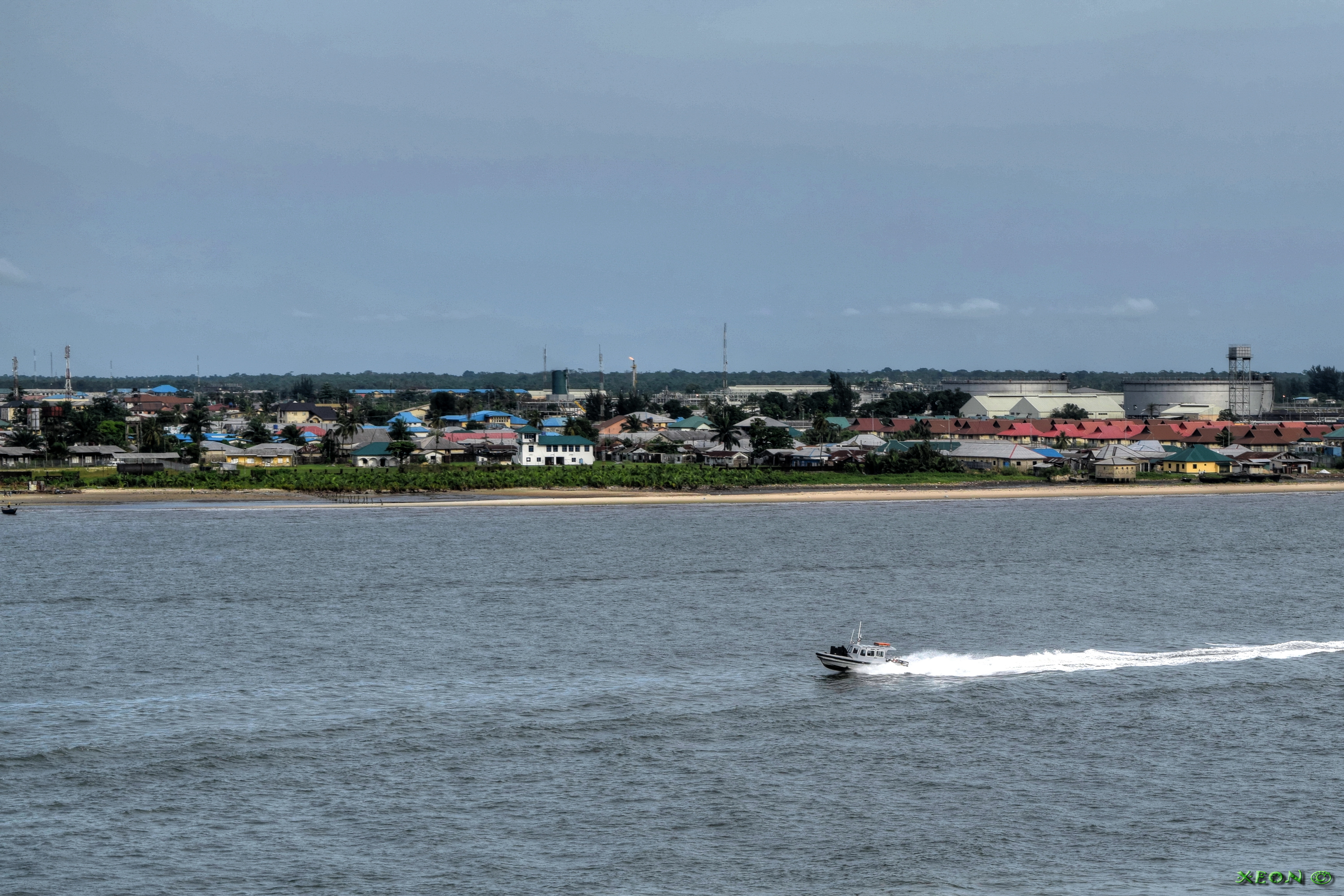
- Bonny panoramic

- Location within Nigeria
- Coordinates: 4°26′N 7°10′E
- Country: Nigeria
- State: Rivers State

Government
  - Type: Local Government Council
  - Local Government Chairman: Hon. (Dame) Anengi Barasua (Action Peoples Party - APP)

Area
  - Total: 645.60 km^{2} (249.27 sq mi)

Population (2006)
  - Total: 214,983
  - Density: 333.00/km^{2} (862.46/sq mi)
- Time zone: UTC+1 (WAT)
- Postal/Zip code: 503101

Bonny (originally Okoloama) is a traditional, coastal town and local government area (LGA) in Rivers State in Southern Nigeria, located on the eponymous island on the Bight of Bonny. It is also the capital of the Kingdom of Bonny.

The region produces a type of crude oil known as Bonny Light oil. Much of the oil extracted onshore in Rivers State is piped to Bonny for export. It has the biggest LNG gas plant in Nigeria, with six trains. Currently, the Federal Government of Nigeria has set plans for the construction of the seventh train of the NLNG to boost its gas production in anticipation of dominating the African market.

Bonny has a bridge being constructed from Bodo in Gokana LGA (also in Rivers State) to enable land transportation. A deep seaport is underway as a corporate social responsibility project from China Civil Engineering Construction Corporation (CCECC).

== Kingdom of Bonny ==
The Kingdom of Bonny used to be a sovereign state in the Niger Delta. It is one of Nigeria's traditional states.

The first settlement, which began as a small town, was called Okoloama, a name taken from the Okulo (or Curlews) that inhabited the island in large numbers.

The Kingdom of Bonny was powerful beginning in the 15th century with the advent of the Portuguese and the following Atlantic slave trade. In the 19th century, it came under increasing pressure from the British to end the trade. It collapsed in the subsequent Bonny civil war of 1869 which led to part of Bonny leaving to form the Kingdom of Opobo. A remnant of Bonny continues to exist, however, as a part of the contemporary aristocratic structure of Nigeria.

Bonny Kingdom is subdivided into two main segments – the mainland and the hinterland. The mainland comprises Bonny Island, which has both Okoloama and Finima and their segments, namely the Main Island (Township), Sandfield, Iwoama, Orosikiri, Aganya, Ayambo, Akiama, Isilegono, New Road, Wilbross pipeline, Workers Camp, and some outlying fishing settlements lying along the Bonny River's coastline. The hinterland includes the village communities such as Kuruma, Fibiri, Oloma, Ayama, Kalaibiama, Ifoko, Sangamabie, Abalamabie and Epellematubo.

== Climate and geography ==
The island known as Bonny LGA is located in the Bight of Bonny.

The LGA has two seasons—the rainy and the dry seasons—and a total area of 646 square kilometres or 250 square miles. Bonny LGA's average temperature is recorded at 25 degrees Celsius or 77 degrees Fahrenheit, and the area's humidity content is reported at 92%.

== See also ==
- Kingdom of Bonny
