= Jaja of Opobo =

King of Opobo and palm oil merchant, c. 1821–1891

King Jaja of Opobo
- Amanyanabo
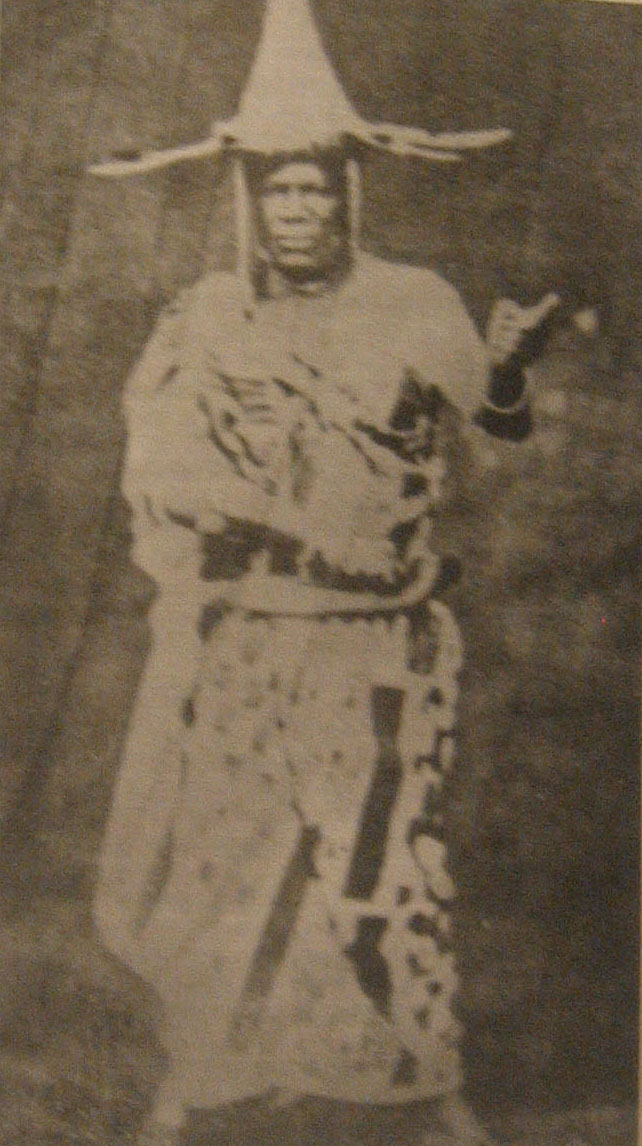
- King Jaja of Opobo, Opobo
- Reign: 25 December 1870–September 1887
- Coronation: 25 December 1870
- Predecessor: No predecessor
- Successor: King Sunday Jaja (Jeki II)
- Born: c. 1821; Umuduruoha, Amaigbo, present-day Imo State
- Died: c. 1891; Tenerife, Spain
- Burial: Opobo
Names
- Jubo Jubogha "Jaja"
- House: Opobu Annie-Pepple
- Dynasty: Jaja

King Jaja of Opobo (full name: Jubo Jubogha ; c. 1821–1891) was the founder and first king (amanyanabo) of the Opobo Kingdom in present-day Rivers State and Akwa Ibom State of Nigeria. Originally belonging to the Igbo ethnicity in Amaigbo in Imo State, he was ritually adopted into the Ijaw one.

== Life and career ==
In his youth, Jaja was kidnapped from Igboland, possibly by the Aro Confederacy, and sold into slavery. He was then brought to Bonny thereafter. Jaja earned his way out of slavery after serving his master for a number of years. At the death of his master, he took charge of the trade and went on to head the Anna Pepple House merchant faction of Bonny. Under him, Annie Pepple absorbed other trade houses until a war with the Manilla Pepple House led by Oko Jumbo compelled Jaja to break away to establish Opobo Kingdom (26 miles east of Bonny) in 1869.

"Oko Jumbo and Ja Ja were looked upon by every one as being the rulers of Bonny."

Opobo came to be a prominent trading post in the region's palm oil trade. Jaja barred entry to European and African middlemen, effectively monopolising trade, and by 1870 was selling eight thousand tons of palm oil directly to the British. Opobo also shipped palm oil directly to Liverpool. Jaja sent his children to schools in Glasgow and enlisted whites to staff the secular school he built in Opobo. He barred any missionaries from entering Opobo.

At the 1884 Berlin Conference the Europeans designated Opobo as British territory. When Jaja refused to cease taxing the British traders, Henry Hamilton Johnston, a British vice consul, invited Jaja for negotiations in 1887. Jaja was abducted on arrival aboard a British vessel; he was tried in Accra in the Gold Coast (now Ghana) then exiled, first to London, and later to Saint Vincent and Barbados in the British West Indies. His presence in the West Indies was alleged to be the cause of civil unrest, as the people of Barbados, of African descent, were upset at the poor treatment of a king from their homeland.

In 1891, Jaja was granted permission to return to Opobo, but died on the way. Following his exile and death, the power of the Opobo state rapidly declined. In 1903 the King Jaja of Opobo Memorial was erected in his honour in Opobo town centre.

The grave of his son, Prince Waribo, is in the churchyard at St Laurence's Church, Frodsham, Cheshire, United Kingdom. Waribo was sent to Frodsham to be educated at Manor House School. He died a year later from inflammation of the lungs on 21 April 1882, aged 13 or 14. There are two white arrows indicating the way to the Prince's grave. One is at the entrance opposite the Ring O'Bells pub, and the other further down the pathway showing the direction to his grave. It has no headstone, but there is an inscription on the edging stone.
