= House society =

Society organized in dwellings

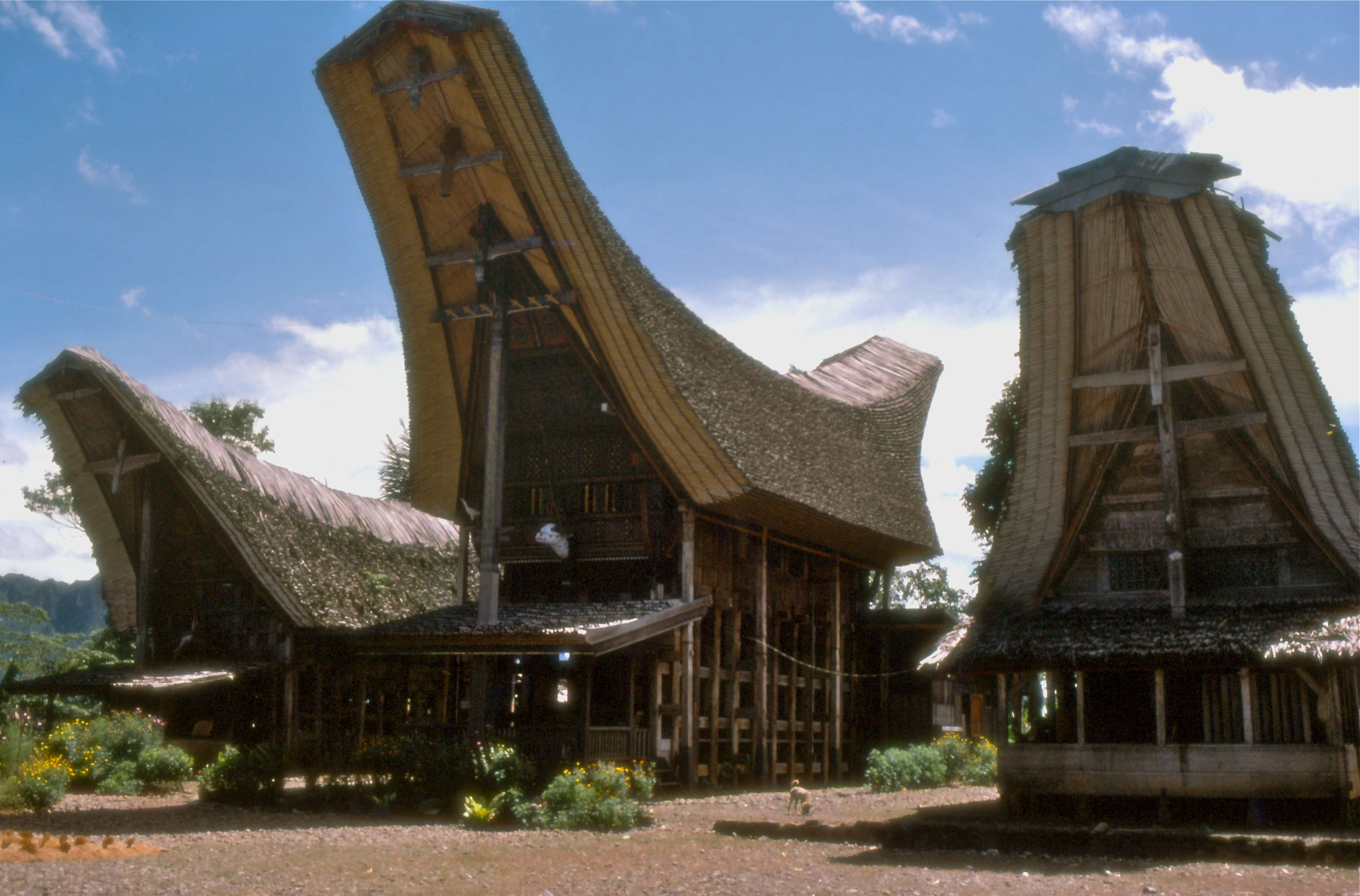
Three tongkonan noble "Houses" in a Torajan village, Sulawesi, Indonesia

In anthropology, a house society is a society where kinship and political relations are organized around membership in corporately-organized dwellings rather than around descent groups or lineages. The concept was originally proposed by Claude Lévi-Strauss who called them "sociétés à maison". The concept has been applied to understand the organization of societies from Mesoamerica and the Moluccas to North Africa and medieval Europe.

The House society is a hybrid, transitional form between kin-based and class-based social orders, and is not one of Lévi-Strauss' 'elementary structures' of kinship. Lévi-Strauss introduced the concept as an alternative to 'corporate kinship group' among the cognatic kinship groups of the Pacific region. The socially significant groupings within these societies have variable membership because kinship is reckoned bilaterally (through both father's and mother's kin) and come together for only short periods. Property, genealogy and residence are not the basis for the group's existence.

== House societies and kinship ==
Lévi-Strauss' most succinct definition of a House was that it is "a corporate body holding an estate made up of both material and immaterial wealth, which perpetuates itself through the transmission of its name, its goods and its titles down a real or imaginary line considered legitimate as long as this continuity can express itself in the language of kinship or of affinity and, most often, of both."

There are three elements to this definition:

1. The House is a corporate body ("moral person") holding an estate made up of both material and immaterial goods.
2. As a "moral person", it is an alternate metaphor replacing "blood" in defining the social identity of the group. As a symbol of the group, the House persists over generations and links the group to its sacred origins.
3. The House persists over time by transmitting its titles through conditional kinship principles: "patrilineal descent and matrilineal descent, filiation and residence, hypergamy and hypogamy, close marriage and distant marriage, heredity and election: all these notions which usually allow anthropologists to distinguish the various known types of society, are united in the house, as if, in the last analysis the spirit (in the eighteenth-century sense) of this institution expressed an effort to transcend, in all spheres of collective life, theoretically incompatible principles."

Only the core group (the highest-ranking members) will inhabit the House as a residence. The other House members (which Errington refers to as the "server group") will only come together on special ritual occasions, making this an "occasional kinship group." Other House members have multiple overlapping ties to other Houses as well, through both mother's and father's kin. Their ability to assert a claim to membership in a House will depend on a number of criteria, such as their parents' participation, their ability to contribute to the House's upkeep, and their participation in its rituals. Successful claims of membership may bring special benefits, such as the right to utilize House resources with the consent of the core members.

== House societies and social ranking ==
Most of the examples of ‘sociétés à maison’ cited by Lévi-Strauss, with the exception of the Kwakiutl Indians of the North-west coast of Canada, were feudal. This has led some to ask if feudalism was an essential feature of House societies, and answering in the negative. Schrauwers, in contrast, has argued that House societies are characteristically organized around a system of social ranks, not feudalism. That is, the House is not an economic class but a socially ranked group (e.g. a nobility) in a society organized around a system of social ranks; while a House may own property, it is thus not tied to a feudal mode of production. Schrauwers gives, as an alternate example, societies organized around slavery where a noble group's property are its slaves (such as the Kwakiutl case).

== Houses and politics ==
Houses are political in three ways; there is an intra-House politics by which leadership is determined and resources are allocated within the House, as well as an inter-House politics between rival Houses. These two forms of political engagement may be connected through agonistic exchange institutions such as the Potlatch. There is, lastly, also a politics of struggle and incorporation between highly ranked noble Houses and those groups like slaves and commoners who lack the resources to maintain their organization as a House.

=== Intra-House political struggle ===
Houses are tied together through oftentimes contradictory forms of kinship, whether descent or alliance. Given that Houses are not lineages, leadership is rarely ascribed by genealogical seniority alone (i.e. primogeniture). Leadership of a House is gained through status competition.

=== Inter-House political struggle ===
A number of traditional Southeast Asian kingdoms, such as those in Bali, or the kingdom of Luwu in Sulawesi, were dominated by noble Houses that competed with each other for control of the state. These states have alternately been described as mandala states.

=== Political struggles between classes within a House society ===
Although they may be referred to as House Societies, not all societies with Houses have those Houses uniformly distributed among all ranks and classes. The House in Bali, as well as in the kingdom of Luwu in Sulawesi, is an "optional" kinship group. Schrauwers has argued that class and House formation are linked. He points out, for example, that the inherited estate of some Sulawesi House societies in the kingdom of Luwu is composed of slaves; that is, the House's property is composed of another social rank of individuals. In this case, class and rank are synonymous. Because they are property, slaves are prevented from forming their own Houses. Commoners in those societies are of a different rank, but lack property, and therefore cannot form their own houses either. The way in which these lower classes were prevented from forming Houses was two-fold. On the one hand, they might be engaged in the agonistic exchange systems with Noble Houses that results in their using up and losing all of their House property. On the other hand, noble Houses at the centre of the state might engage in policies of divide and rule, urging different groups at the periphery to attack each other, take slaves, and these would form Houses which then intermarry with the Houses at the centre.
