= Kingdom of Bonny =

Grand Bonny Kingdom Okolo-Ama Bonny
- Traditional state
- Kingdom of Bonny
- Nickname: Bonny Island
- Interactive map of Grand Bonny Kingdom
- Coordinates: 4°26′N 7°10′E
- Country: Nigeria
- State: Rivers State
- Founder: Kings Ndoli, Opuamakuba, Alagbariye and Asimini
- Capital: Bonny

Government
  - Type: Traditional Monarchy
  - Body: Chiefs' Council
  - Amanayanabo: King Edward Asimini William Dappa Pepple III, Perekule XI

Population
  - Estimate (2022): 309,200
- Time zone: UTC+1 (WAT)

The Kingdom of Bonny, otherwise known as Grand Bonny, is a traditional state based on the town of Bonny in Rivers State, Nigeria. In the pre-colonial period, it was an important slave trading port, later trading palm oil products. During the 19th century the British became increasingly involved in the internal affairs of the kingdom, in 1886 assuming control under a protectorate treaty. Today the King of Bonny has a largely ceremonial role.

== Introduction ==
The Kingdom of Bonny (also known as Grand Bonny or Ibanise) is a traditional Ijaw state based on the town of Bonny in Rivers State, Nigeria. The founders of the island kingdom were Ijaw people from the Central Niger Delta, specifically from the Kolokuma area in the Ebeni-toru region (in the present-day Kolokuma/Opokuma Local Government Area of Bayelsa State). The kingdom was founded before or about 1000 AD, initially at Orupiri, before the settlers relocated to Okoloama, the core of Grand Bonny. The island on which the town of Bonny is situated was full of curlews, and the first settlers therefore called it Okoloama (from Okulo, lit. Curlews), meaning "curlew town." This name is still used locally.

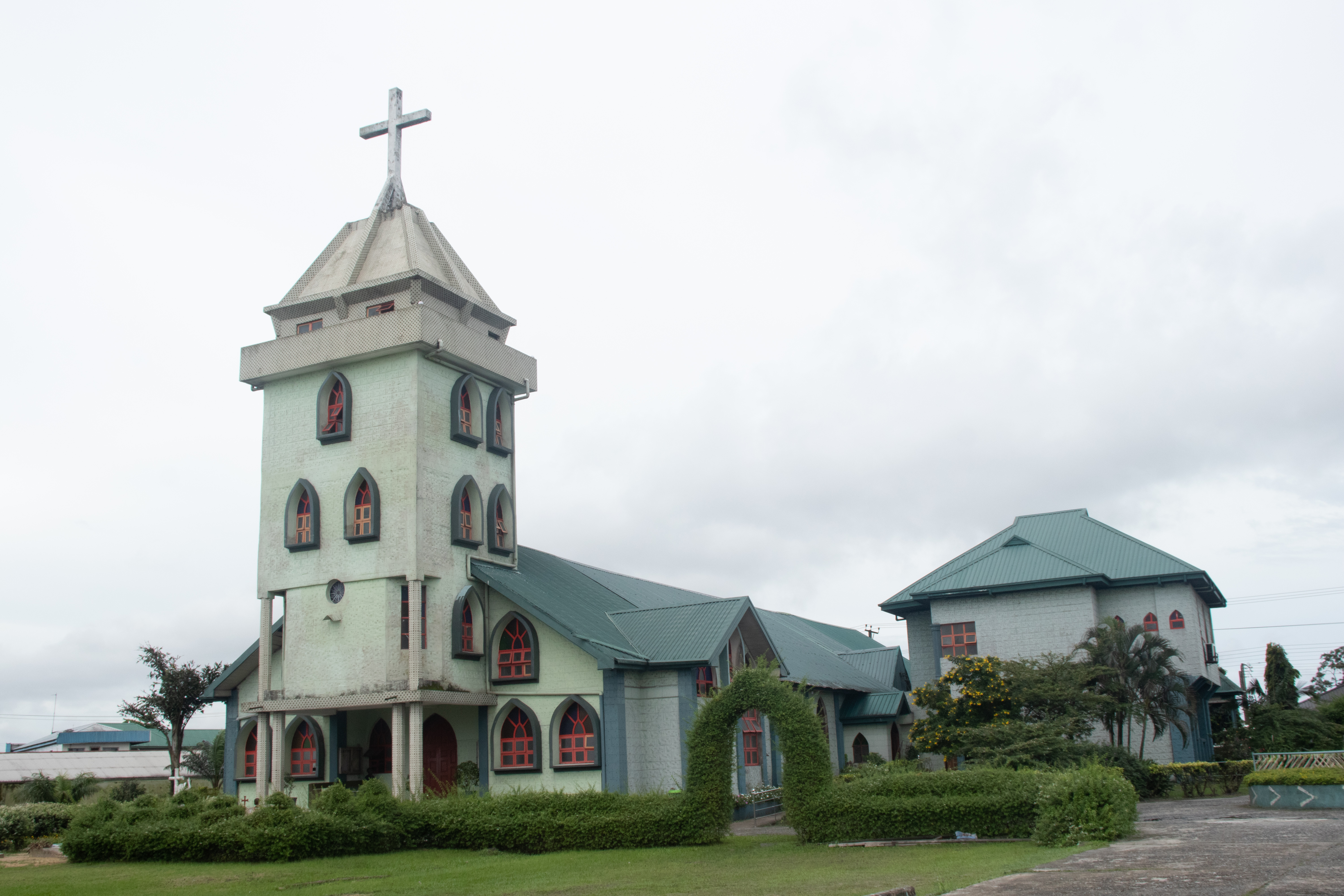
St. Stephens Anglican church, Bonny Kingdom

According to Ibani tradition, the kingdom had four founding fathers, who are also regarded as the first four kings: Ndoli (also called Okpara Ndoli), Opuamakuba, Alagbariya (recognised as the Okoloamakoromabo or Founder of Bonny), and Asimini. After these initial four kings, their blood descendants ruled the kingdom through successive reigns until the era of King Awusa (Halliday), the twelfth monarch. King Awusa Halliday was then succeeded by King Perekule I, who was crowned by Chief Adapa Alagbariya of the Bristol Alagbariya Major House. King Perekule I went on to establish the Pepple dynasty and created a new class of chiefs in the kingdom, beginning with Chief Allison in about the second half of the 18th century. The Ibani people identify as Ijaw today.

Presently, Bonny Kingdom is subdivided into two main segments: the mainland and the hinterland. The mainland comprises Bonny Island and its segments, namely the Main Island (Township), Sandfield, Iwoama, Orosikiri, Aganya, Ayambo, Akiama, Isilegono, New Road, Wilbross Pipeline, Workers Camp, and some outlying fishing settlements lying along the Bonny River's coastline. The hinterland includes the village communities such as Kuruma, Ayama, Kalaibiama and Oloma, as well as Finima, Fibiri, Sangamabie, Ifoko, and Abalamabie.

== The House system ==
House of Perekule Pepple
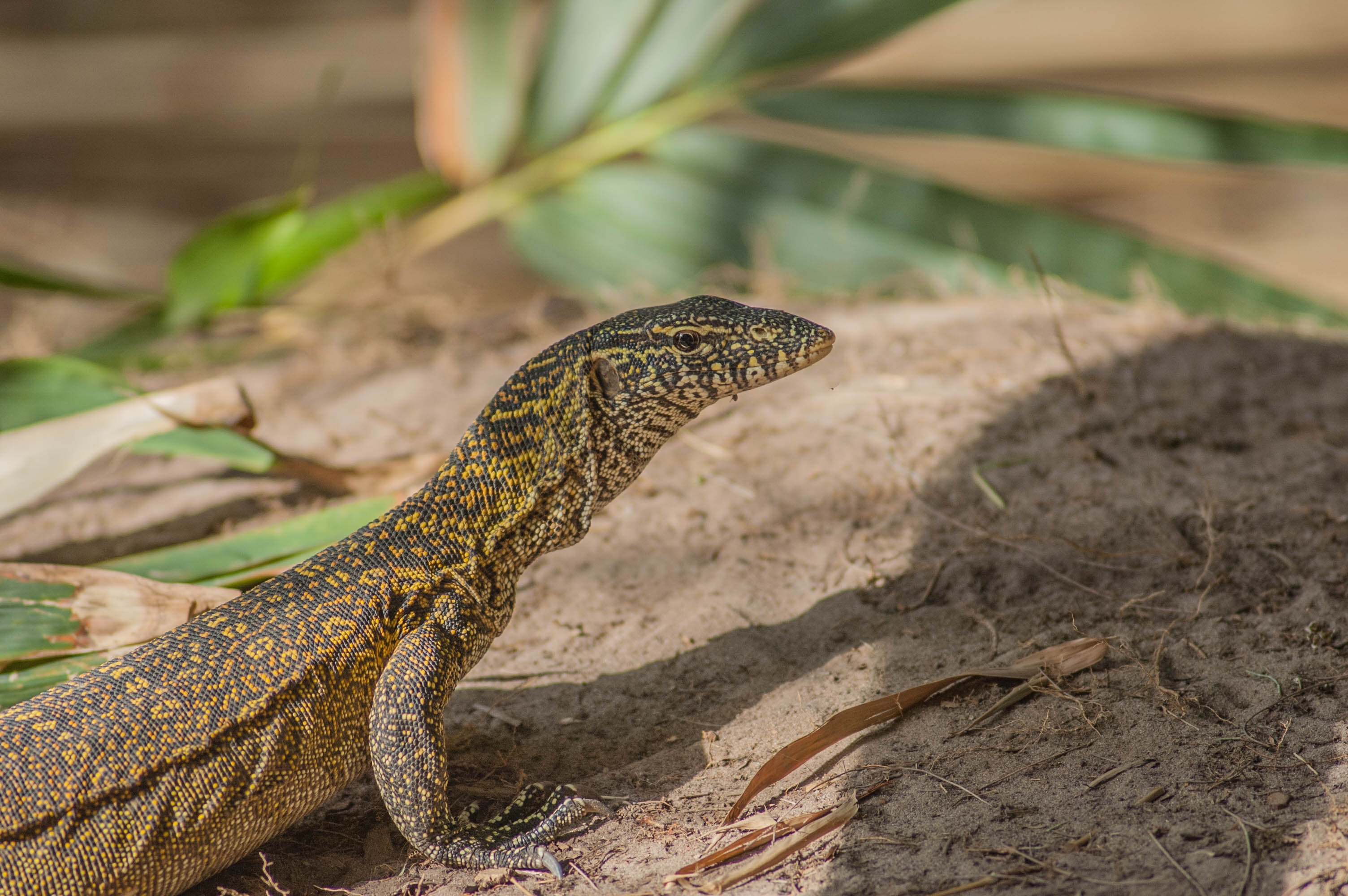
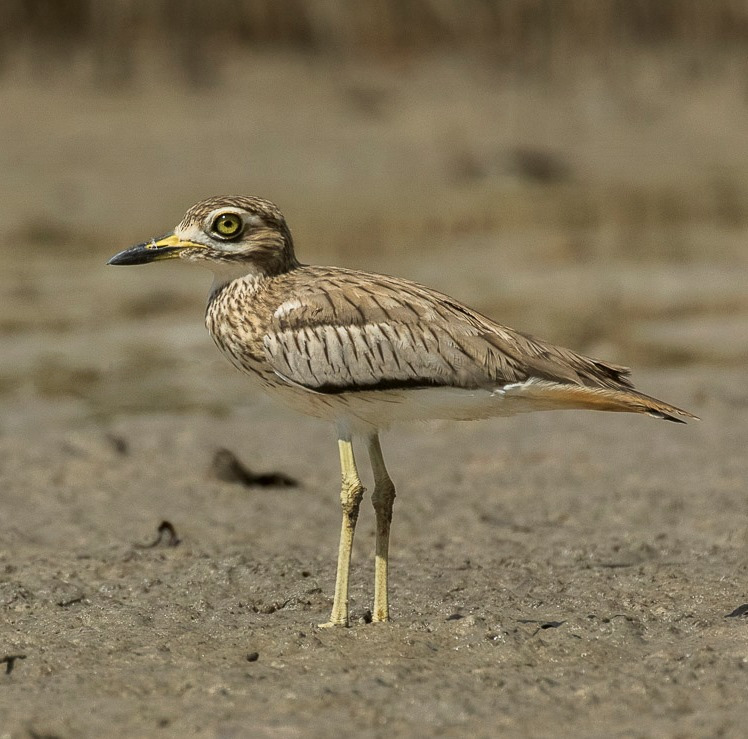
- Nigerian royal dynasty The Monitor Lizard, totem of the war god Ikuba and heraldic beast of Bonny's classical kings. The Curlew, totem of the kingdom as a whole and heraldic beast of its modern kings.
- Parent house: Asimini
- Current region: Niger Delta
- Founded: 18th century
- Founder: Perekule I
- Current head: Perekule XI
- Titles: Amanyanabo of Bonny; Alabo of a Bonny House; Wariopusenibo; Warisenibo; Amaopusenibo; Amasenibo
- Styles: Majesty; Royal Highness
- Members: George Oruigbiji Pepple; George Goodhead; Oko Jumbo
- Connected families: Opobo royal family
- Cadet branches: Fubara Manilla Pepple; Opubo Anne Pepple

At the start of the modern period, King Awusa Halliday was succeeded in the kingship by King Perekule - who was crowned by Chief Adapa Alagbariya of the Bristol Alagbariya Major House. This was long before King Perekule created a new class of chiefs in the kingdom, one that began with Chief Allison in about the second half of the 18th century. The chieftaincy titles created by King Perekule, which were based on the lineage/house/family system that was itself first established by the founding generation of the ancient kingdom, are distinct from the hereditary traditional rulership chieftaincies of the "Duawaris" - or original royal houses - of Grand Bonny (such as the Bristol Alagbariyas).

The Kingdom of Bonny has thirty-five chieftaincy houses. These are fourteen major chieftaincy houses (five among which are Duawaris); twenty minor chieftaincy houses; and then the George Pepple lineage of the Perekule royal house that has recently been producing kings of the kingdom. The ancestry of the Perekule royal house may be traced to the Duawaris themselves. It was the founding generation of Bonny that established the kingdom's civilization and commonwealth. All the chieftaincy houses, and the people that belong to them, derive their authority in Bonny from their descent from its founders.

Bonny's traditional institution is headed by King Edward William Asimini Dappa Pepple III, Perekule XI, who serves as the Amanyanabo (King or natural ruler). The Chiefs’ Council that serves under him is led by Chief Dagogo Claude Wilcox, who is the high chief and head of Wilcox Major House. Each high chief independently rules his house because the chiefs’ council is traditionally seen as a commonwealth of independent nations that came together for the sole purpose of protecting the kingdom as a whole.

== History ==
=== Trade ===
Bonny became important in the 15th century with the arrival of the Portuguese and the growth of the Atlantic slave trade. At its height of power, Bonny was one of the main entrepôts on the Slave Coast. Later the Dutch and then the British took control of the slave trade in the region, with the British renaming the port "Bonny". When the British passed an act to abolish the slave trade in 1807, the port turned to the export of palm oil products, ivory and Guinea pepper.

=== Military ===
Bonny had a navy of war canoes for protecting and extending trade routes. War canoes were associated with canoe houses and such houses often had 10 or more war canoe chiefs. Primary sources of the late 18th century stated that Bonny's vessels were equipped with bow cannon or guns of large calibre, mounted on the bow. Such vessels could carry 140 people.

=== Growing British influence ===
William Dappa Pepple I ascended the throne in 1830. Over time, he became ineffective, with medical problems essentially related to a stroke in 1852. Others became opportunistic and stirred up opposition to his rule. In 1854 the British deported the king. King Dapu Fubara II Pepple ("Dappo") was appointed in his place, but died on 13 Aug 1855. The acting British Consul in the Bight of Biafra, J.W.B. Lynslager, signed a document on 11 September 1855 appointing the chiefs Anne Pepple, Ada Allison, Captain Hart and Manilla Pepple as a regency, required to consult with Banigo and Oko Jumbo, "two gentlemen of the river".

==== Bonny civil war ====
Oko Jumbo, who became leader of the Fubara Manilla Pepple house and effective ruler of the kingdom, became engaged in a struggle with the Anne Pepple house, which was led by a chief named Jubo Jubogha, known as Ja-Ja to the British.

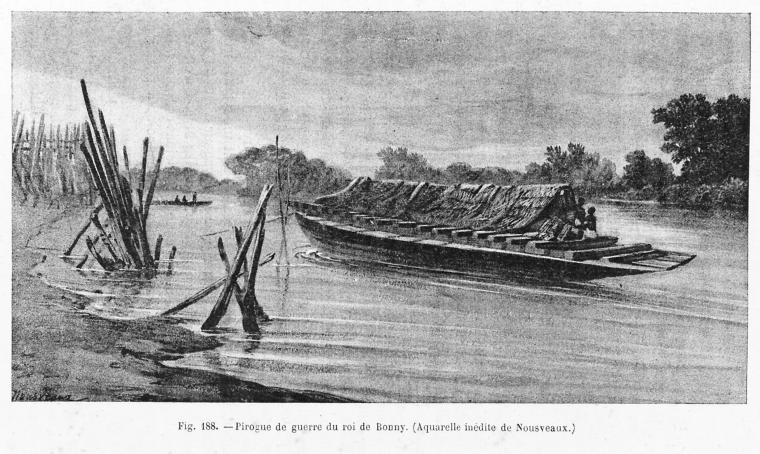
Royal Canoe of the Kingdom of Bonny, 1890

In an attempt to stabilize the situation, Chief Omoni Jack Brown, Governor General of Finima in conjunction with the British, restored King William Dappa Pepple I in 1861, and for the next five years until his death on 30 September 1866 the kingdom was relatively peaceful.

King William Dappa was succeeded by his son George Oruigbiji Pepple (born 1849), who had been educated in England. George Pepple was a Christian, and on 21 April 1867, supported by Oko Jumbo and other chiefs, he declared the monitor lizard was no longer the sacred deity of the kingdom. The tension between the Manilla Pepple and Anne Pepple houses was revived at this time. In 1869 a major battle between the two factions led to Ja-Ja founding a new state at Opobo, further inland, taking some of the palm oil trade away from Bonny.

==== Other wars ====
Bonny had previously been on reasonably good terms with the Kalabari Kingdom, a trading state to its west. With the loss of trade to Opobo, Bonny began pushing up rivers traditionally controlled by Kalabari, causing a series of armed clashes. Bonny was at times assisted by the Nembe Kingdom to the west and Okrika further inland, while Opobo allied with Kalabari. In 1873, and again in 1882 the British consul had to intervene and force the feuding parties to agree to treaties.

=== Protectorate and later history ===
The unstable balance of power within Bonny deteriorated. On 14 December 1883 King George was deposed.

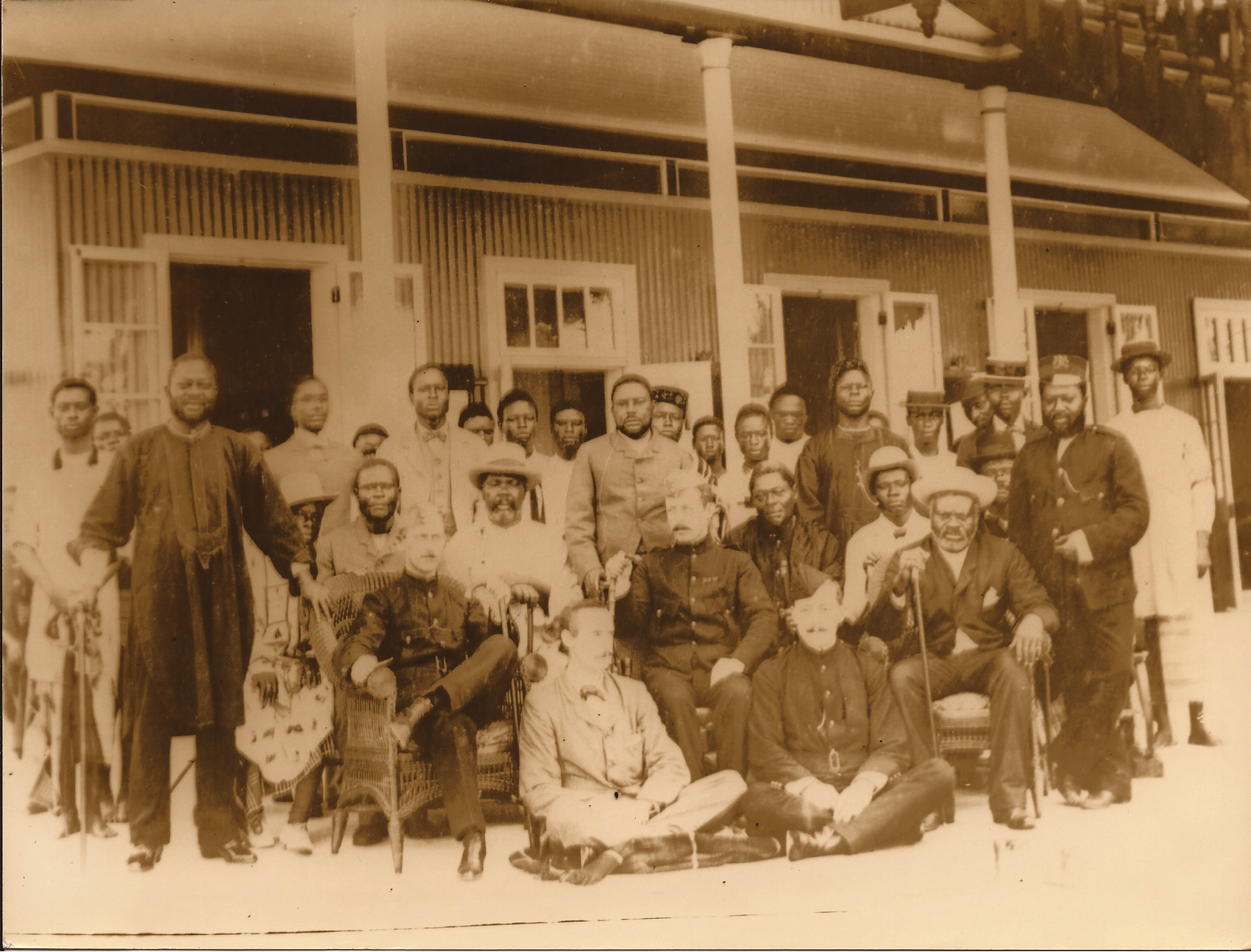
Bonny Chiefs with a Naval Commandant in 1896

The next year Oko Jumbo fell out with the other chiefs in Bonny. There were rumors that he wanted to place one of his sons on the throne, although a planned coup attempt in January 1885 came to nothing. Another son, Herbert Jumbo, who had been educated in England, quarreled with his father and placed himself under the protection of the British consul.

In February 1886 a protectorate treaty was concluded between Bonny and Britain. A ruling council was established, and King George Pepple was restored to his throne. Oko Jumbo was publicly degraded, his bans on Christianity were repealed and afterwards he was a spent force in Bonny politics.

King George died in October 1888, and was succeeded by a series of regents, kings and at one time a Chiefs Council before Edward Asimini William Dappa Pepple III (Perekule XI) took the throne in 1996.

== Rulers ==
=== Independent state during the early modern era ===
The following were the independent rulers of Bonny.

Start	End	Ruler
1759	1760	Awusa "King Halliday"
1760		Perekule I "Captain Pepple"
	1792	Fubara I Agbaa "Manilla Pepple"
1792	1828	Opubo "Annie Pepple the Great"
1828	1830	Adumtaye-Bereibibo Adapa Bristol-Alagbariya (Pepple IV?)
1830	23 January 1854	Dappa Perekule (1st time) (installed Jan 1837)
23 January 1854	13 August 1855	Dapu Fubara II Pepple "King Dappo" (d. 1855)
11 September 1855	18 August 1861	Regency
18 August 1861	30 September 1866	William Dappa Pepple I (Dappa Perekule) (2nd time)
30 September 1866	14 December 1883	George Oruigbiji Pepple

=== Protectorate and Nigerian Federation ===
These are the rulers that reigned after the Kingdom of Bonny became part of the British protectorate, as well as the ones that have reigned in the independent Federation of Nigeria:

Start	End	Ruler
22 Jan 1887	31 Oct 1888	George Oruigbiji Pepple (2nd time)
31 Oct 1888	28 Feb 1892	Waribo (Regent)
1892	1923	Ate (Regent)
1932	14 Feb 1932	Claude Sodienye (Regent, d. 1952)
14 Feb 1932	1937	Secondus George Pepple II (d. 1939)
1937	1952	Claude Sodienye -Regent (2nd time)
1952	27 Dec 1957	Francis D. Banigo (Regent)
27 Dec 1957	1970	Eugene William Dappa Pepple II
1970	1978	Regency
1978	1993	Opuada Pepple
1993	1996	Osobonye Rogers Longjohn (Regent)
1996 till date		Edward Asimini William Dappa Pepple III, Perekule XI

== See also ==
- Cannibalism in Africa § West Africa
