= Opobo =

Nigerian city state

- City state
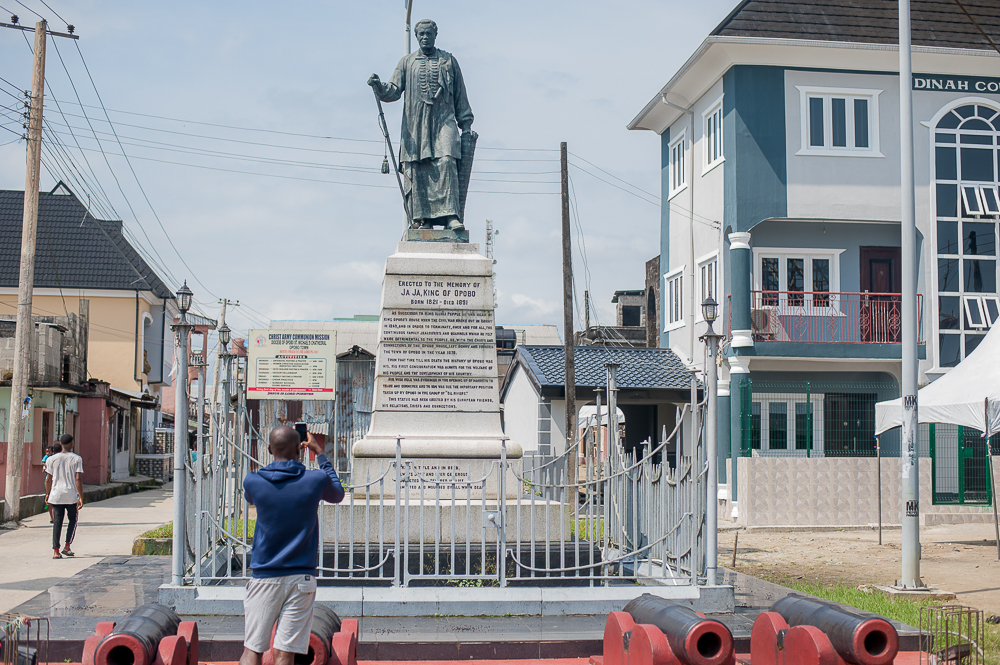
- Interactive map of Opobo
- Coordinates: 4°30′41″N 7°32′24″E
- Country: Nigeria
- State: Rivers State
- LGA: Opobo-Nkoro
- Founder: Jaja of Opobo

Government
  - Amanyanabo: Dandeson Douglas Jaja V
- Time zone: UTC+1 (WAT)

Opobo is a community, and former city-state, in Rivers state, South South region of Nigeria.

Opobo is divided into 14 sections ("polo"), made up of 67 war canoe houses. The 14 sections are Adibie, Biriye, Diepiri, Dapu, Dappa Ye Amakiri, Epelle, Fubarakworo, Iroanya, Jaja, Kalaomuso, Ukonu, Kiepirima, Owujie, and Tolofari.

== History ==
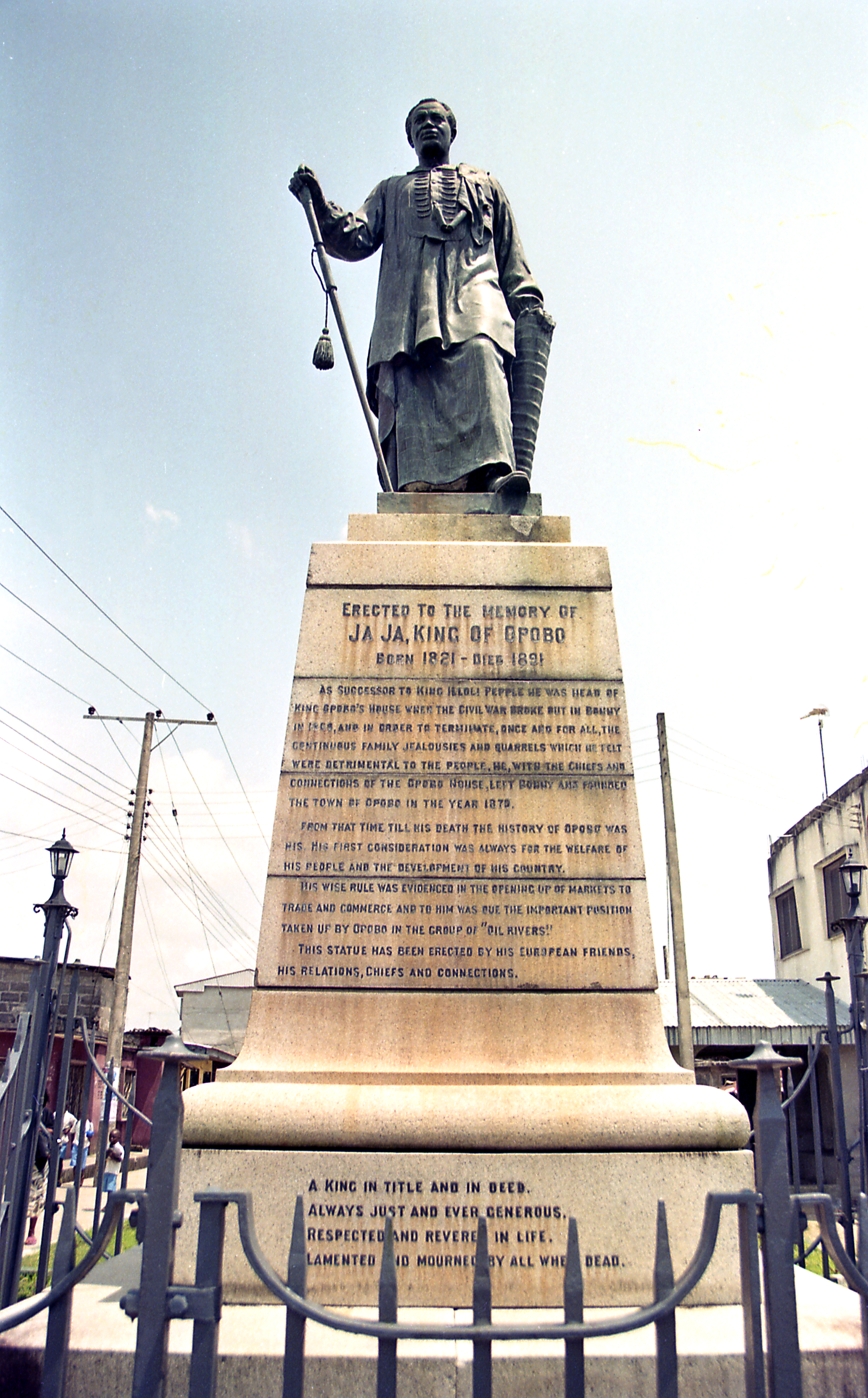
King Jaja of Opobo Memorial

Opobo is located to the east of the Kingdom of Bonny. Bonny and Opobo are of the same origin, both associated with the Ndoki people. (Note: For more on the Ndoki and inter-relationship, see Umuagbai and Akwete, two major settlements of the Ndoki.) Jubo Jubogha rose from slavery to lead the Anna Pepple chieftaincy house of Bonny. In 1870, Jubo first arrived in what is now Opobo, having moved there due to a civil war in Bonny between his followers and those of Chief Oko Jumbo, the leader of the rival Manilla Pepple chieftaincy family.

== Rulers ==
The rulers of Opobo were:

Start	End	Ruler
25 December 1870	September 1887	Jubo Jubogha "Jaja I" (b. 1821 – d. 1891)
September 1887	1891	Perekule (chairman Council of Chiefs)
1891	1893	"Cookey Gam" (political agent)
1893	12 October 1915	Obiesigha Jaja II (Frederick Sunday)
1916	1936	Dipiri (Arthur Mac Pepple)
1936	1942	Sodienye Jaja III (1st time) (Douglas Mac Pepple) (d. 1980)
1942	1946	Stephen Ubogu Jaja IV (acting)
1952	31 July 1980	Sodienye Jaja III (2nd time) (Douglas Mac Pepple)
1980	2002	Vacant
1 October 2004	14 June 2025	King Dandeson Douglas Jaja V (b. 1947)
26 September 2026	Present	King Charles Douglas MacPepple Jaja VI

== Notable people ==
- Kenneth Minimah, CFR, Nigerian infantry soldier and former Nigerian Army Chief of Army Staff
- Adawari Pepple, businessman, and former senator
- Atedo Peterside, CON, Nigerian entrepreneur, investment banker and economist

== Gallery ==
Opobo Kingdom Masquerades (Ówú)

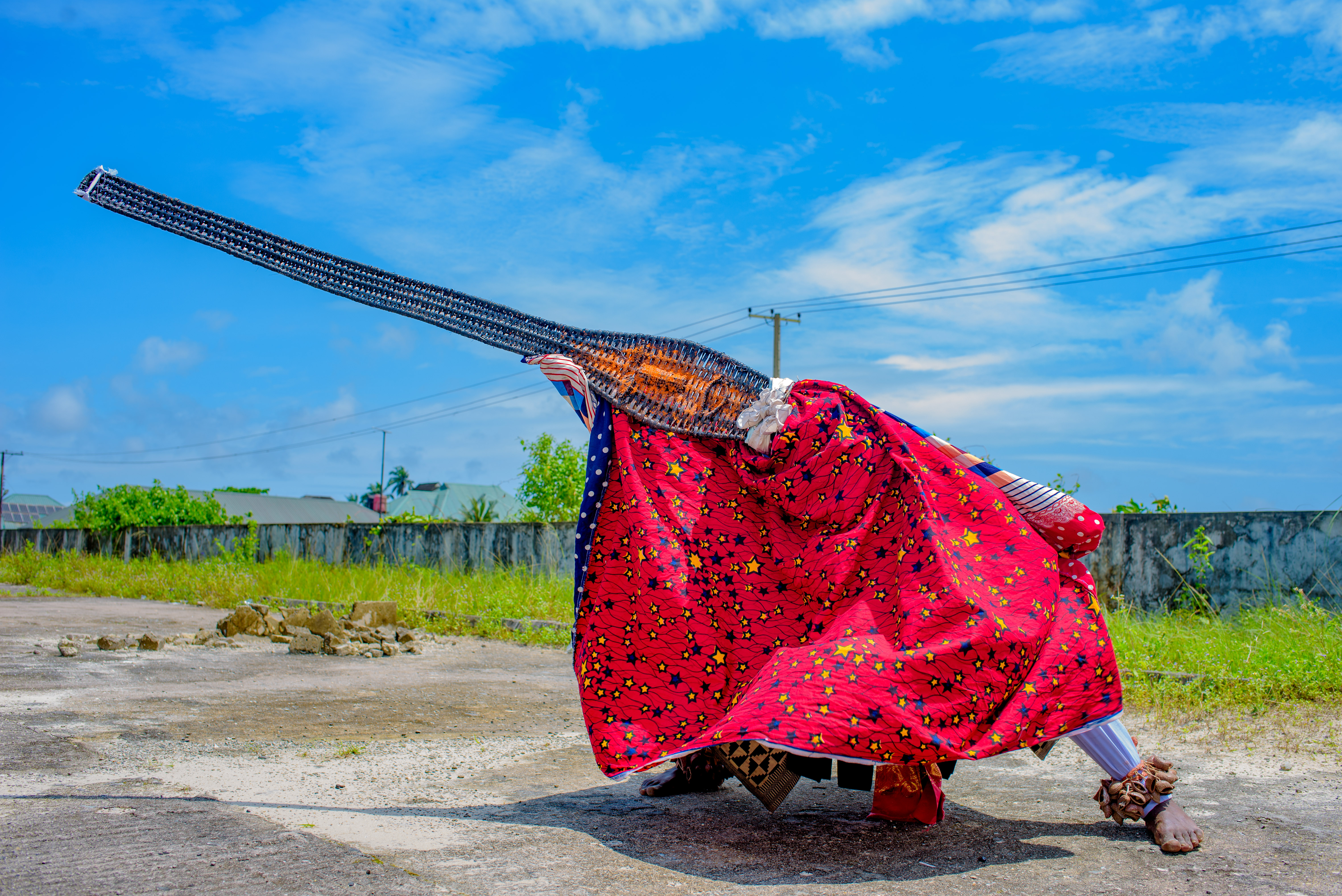
Owu Ibiapu Fongu

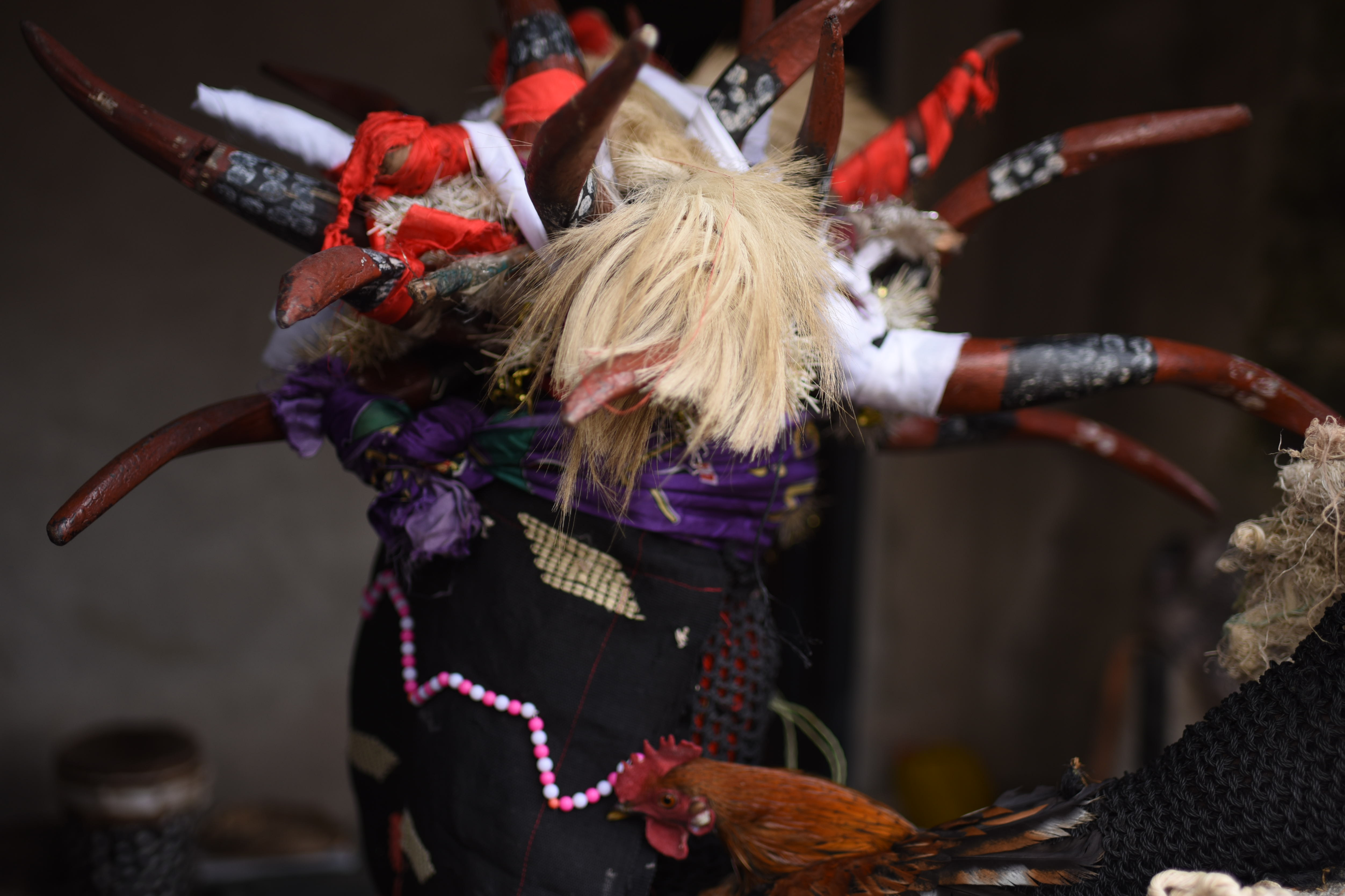
Owu Okonko

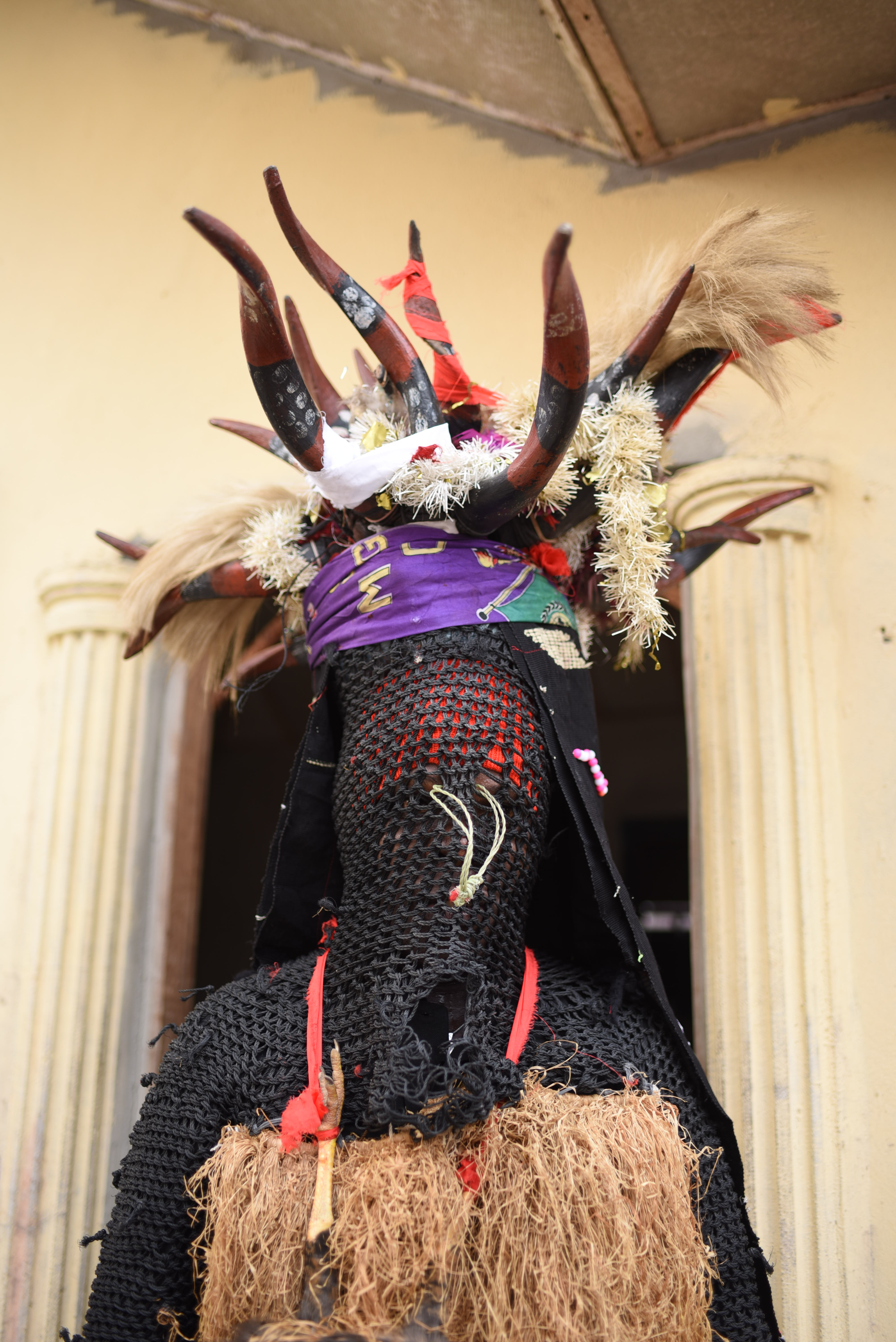
Owu Okonko

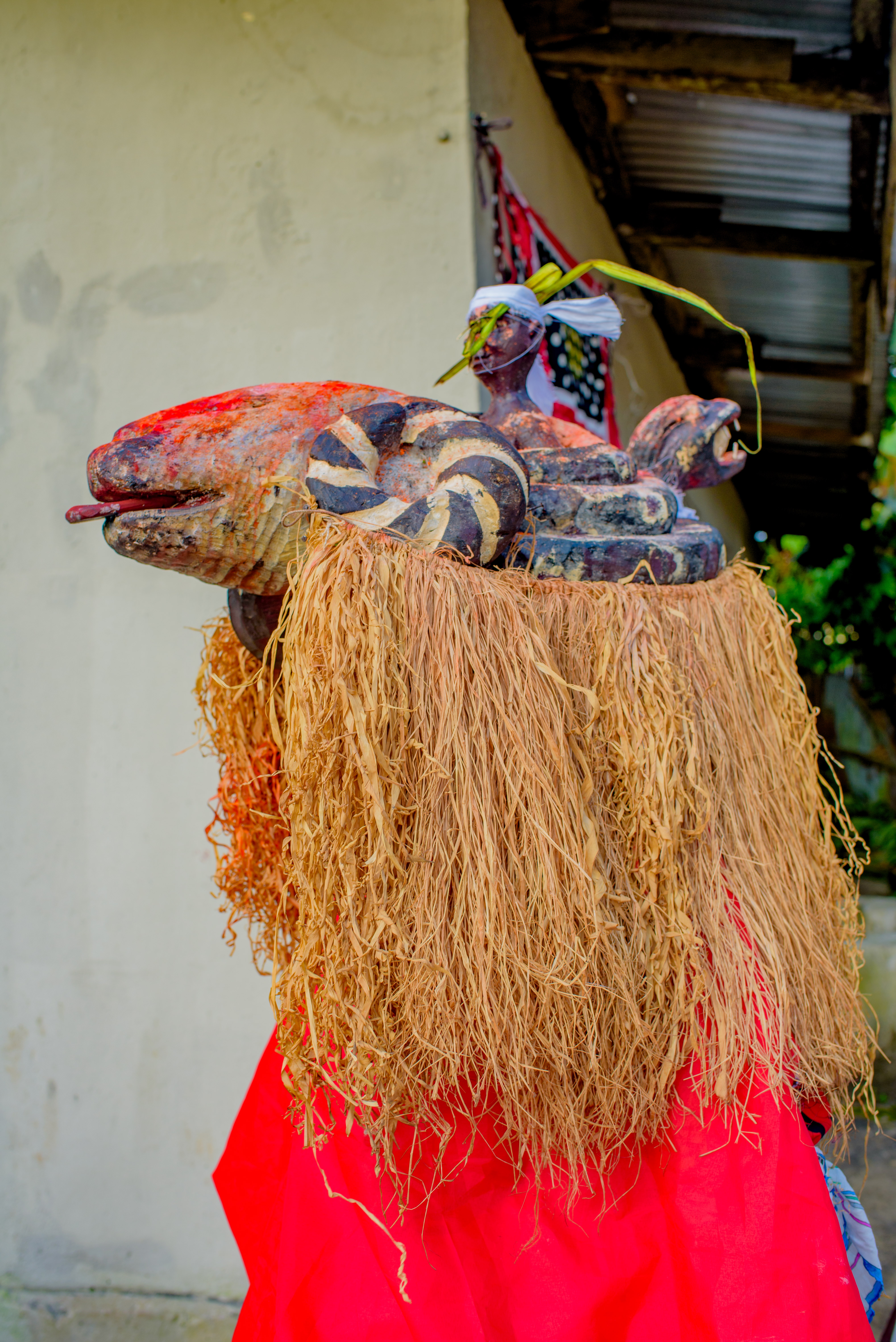
Owu Ibiapu Fongu

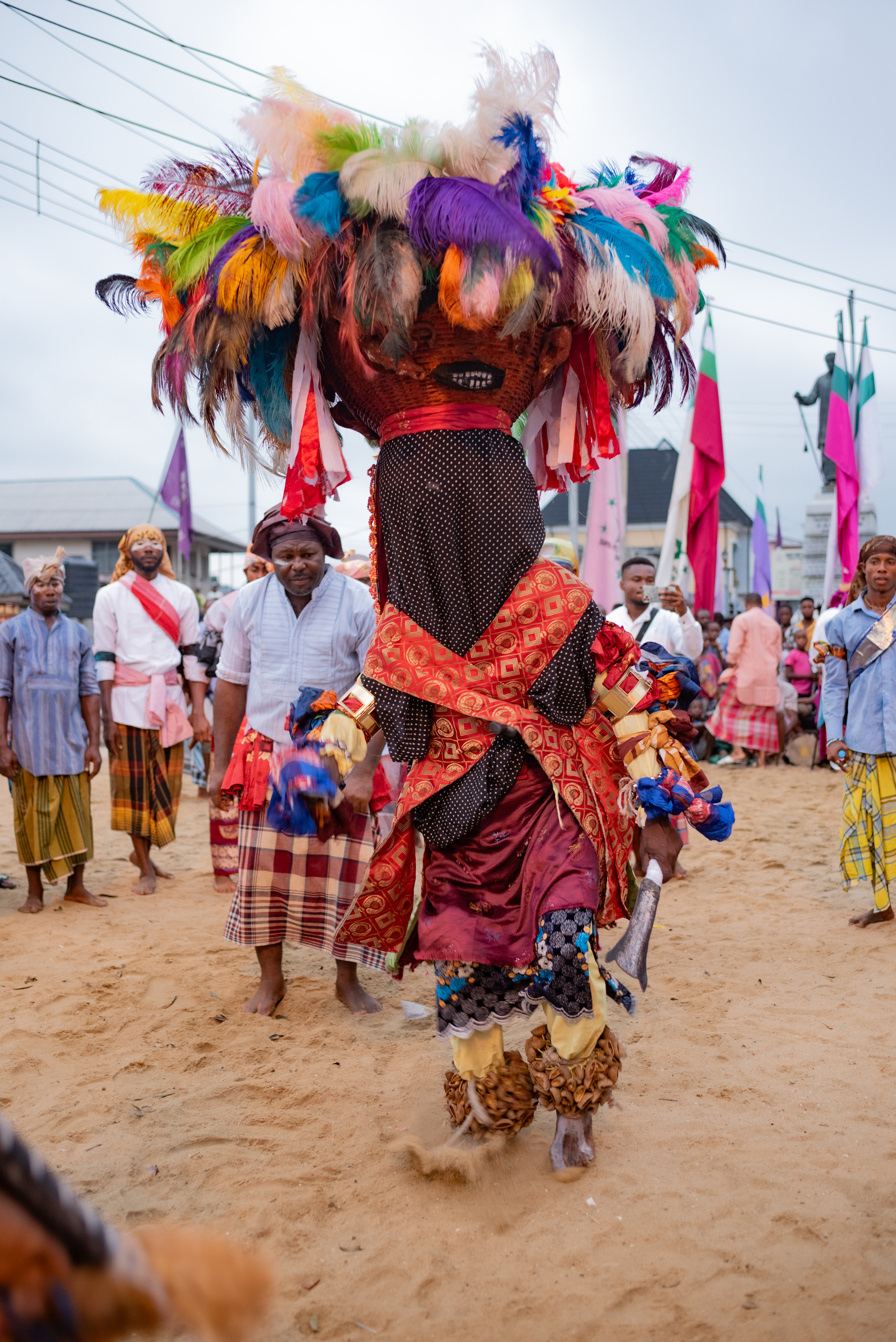
Owu Egbelegbe

Sounds from Opobo

Ngelenge Sound ( Xylophone) beat

Ekere fari

Okonko drum beat

Owu masquerades chants

Ngunume
