= List of Nigerian federal constituencies =

This is a list of the 360 constituencies represented in the House of Representatives of the Federal Republic of Nigeria, as at November 2024.

== History ==
The House of Representatives (also called Green Chamber) is the lower chamber of Nigeria's bicameral National Assembly. The Green Chamber has 360 members who are elected in single-member constituencies using the plurality (or first-past-the-post) system, most recently in 2023. Members serve four-year terms.

== Abia State – 8 seats ==
Abia state is made up of 8 federal constituencies which covers 17 local government areas.

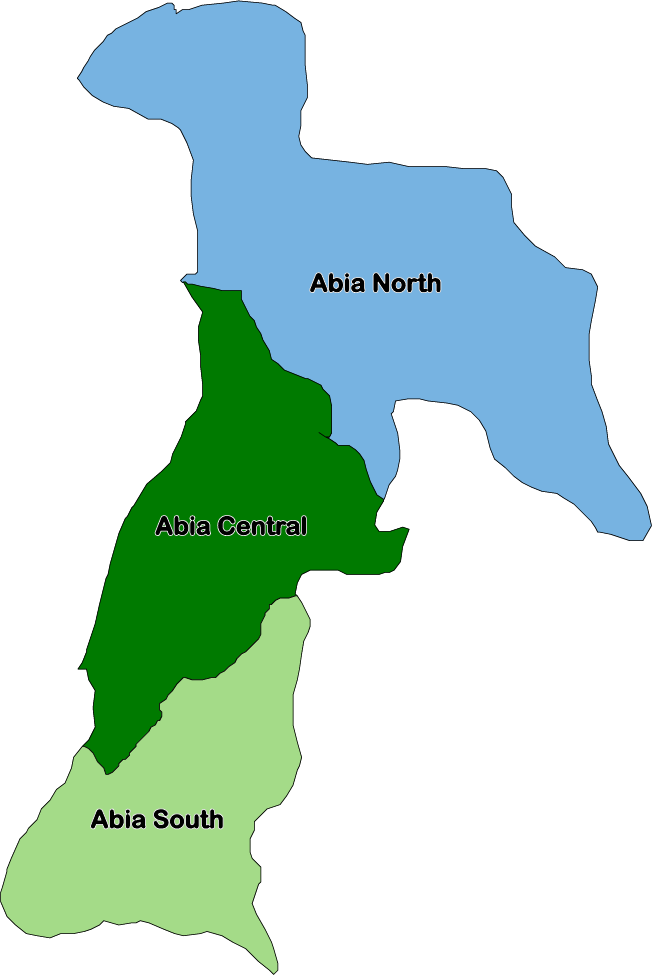
Map of Abia State

Senatorial District	Constituency
Abia South	Aba North/Aba South
Abia North	Arochukwu/Ohafia
Abia North	Bende
Abia Central	Isiala Ngwa North/Isiala Ngwa South
Abia North	Isuikwuato/Umunneochi
Abia Central	Obingwa/Ugwunagbo/Osisioma
Abia South	Ukwa East/Ukwa West
Abia Central	Umuahia North/Umuahia South/Ikwuano

== Adamawa State – 8 seats ==
Adamawa state is made up of 8 federal constituencies which covers 21 local government areas.

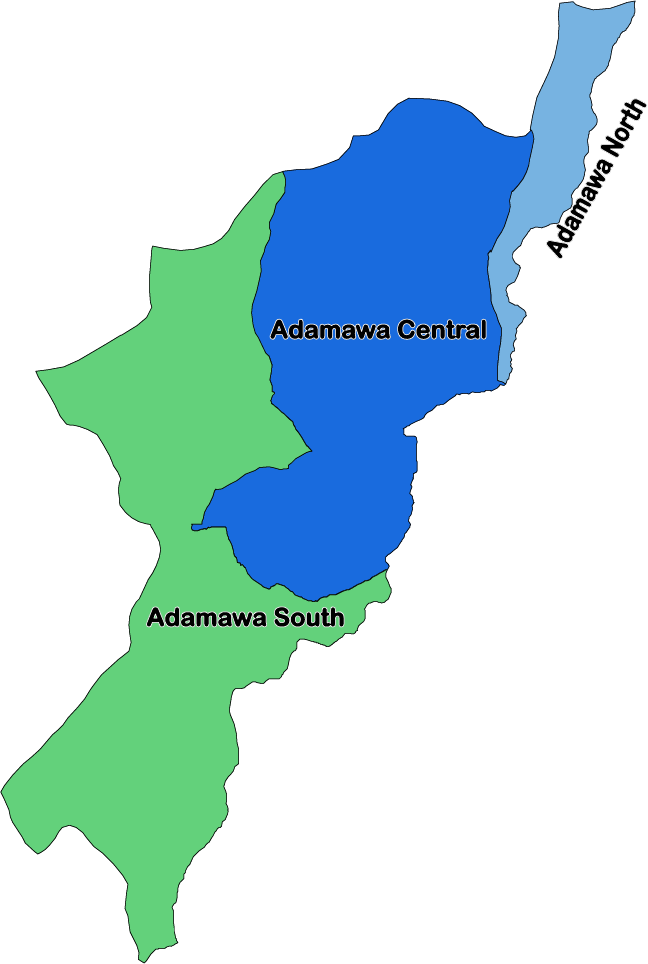
Adamawa State Map

Senatorial District	Constituency
Adamawa South	Demsa/Numan/Lamurde
Adamawa Central	Fufore/Song
Adamawa South	Guyuk/Shelleng
Adamawa Central	Hong/Gombi
Adamawa South	Jada/Ganye/Mayo Belwa/Toungo
Adamawa North	Michika/Madagali
Adamawa North	Mubi North/Mubi South/Maiha
Adamawa Central	Yola North/Yola South/Girei

== Akwa Ibom State – 10 seats ==
Akwa Ibom state is made up of 10 federal constituencies which covers 31 local government areas.

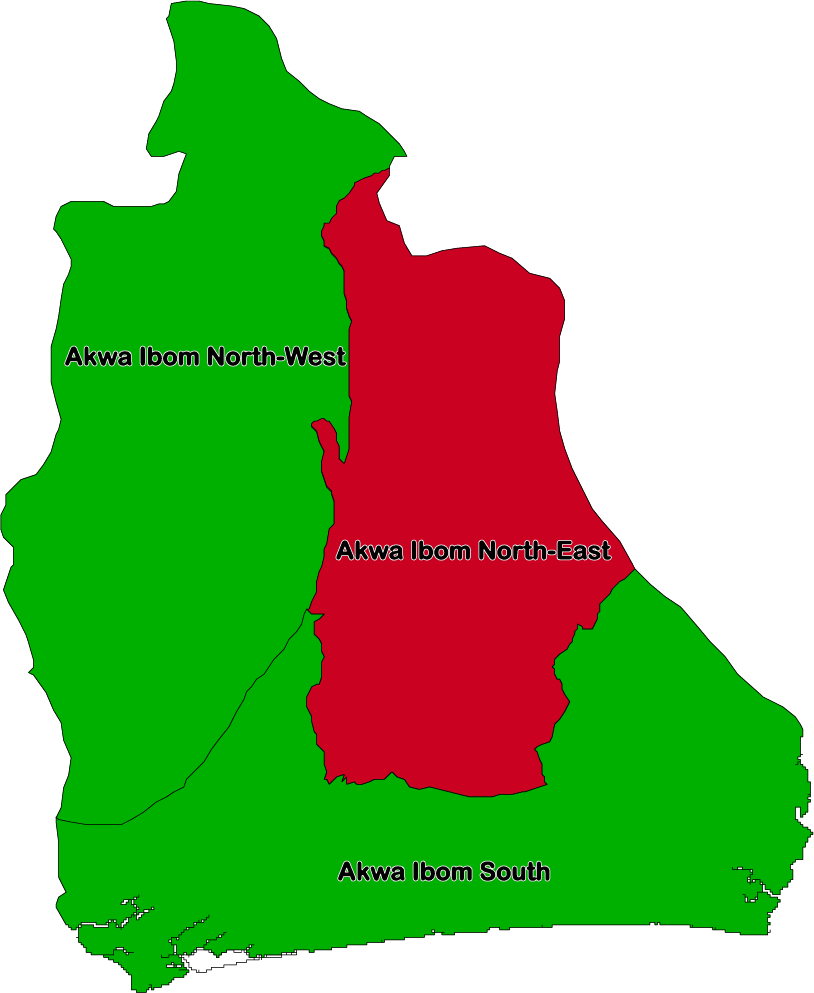
Akwa Ibom State Map

Senatorial District	Constituency
Akwa Ibom North West	Abak/Etim Ekpo/Ika
Akwa Ibom South	Eket/Onna/Esit Eket/Ibeno
Akwa Ibom North East	Etinan/Nsit Ibom/Nsit ubium
Akwa Ibom North West	Ikono/Ini
Akwa Ibom South	Ikot Abasi/Mkpat Enin/Eastern Obolo
Akwa Ibom North West	Ikot Ekpene/Essien Udim/ Obot Akara
Akwa Ibom North East	Itu/Ibiono Ibom
Akwa Ibom South	Oron/Mbo/Okobo/Udung Uko/Urue Offong/Oruko
Akwa Ibom North West	Ukanafun/Oruk Anam
Akwa Ibom North East	Uyo/Uruan/Nsit Atai/ Ibesikpo Asutan

== Anambra State – 11 seats ==
Anambra state is made up of 11 federal constituencies which covers 21 local government areas.

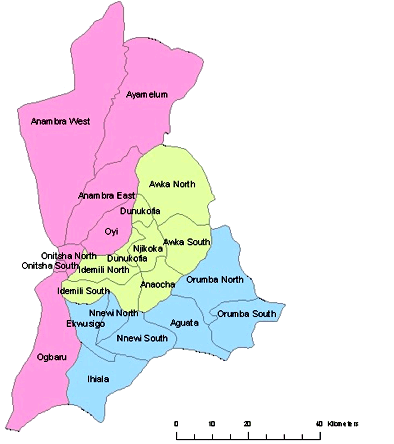
Anambra State Map

Senatorial District	Constituency
Anambra South	Aguata
Anambra North	Anambra East/West
Anambra Central	Awka North/South
Anambra Central	Idemili North/South
Anambra South	Ihiala
Anambra Central	Njikoka/Dunukofia/Anaocha
Anambra South	Nnewi North/South/Ekwusigo
Anambra North	Ogbaru
Anambra North	Onitsha North/South
Anambra South	Orumba North/South
Anambra North	Oyi/Ayamelum

== Bauchi State – 12 seats ==
Bauchi state is made up of 12 federal constituencies which covers 20 local government areas.

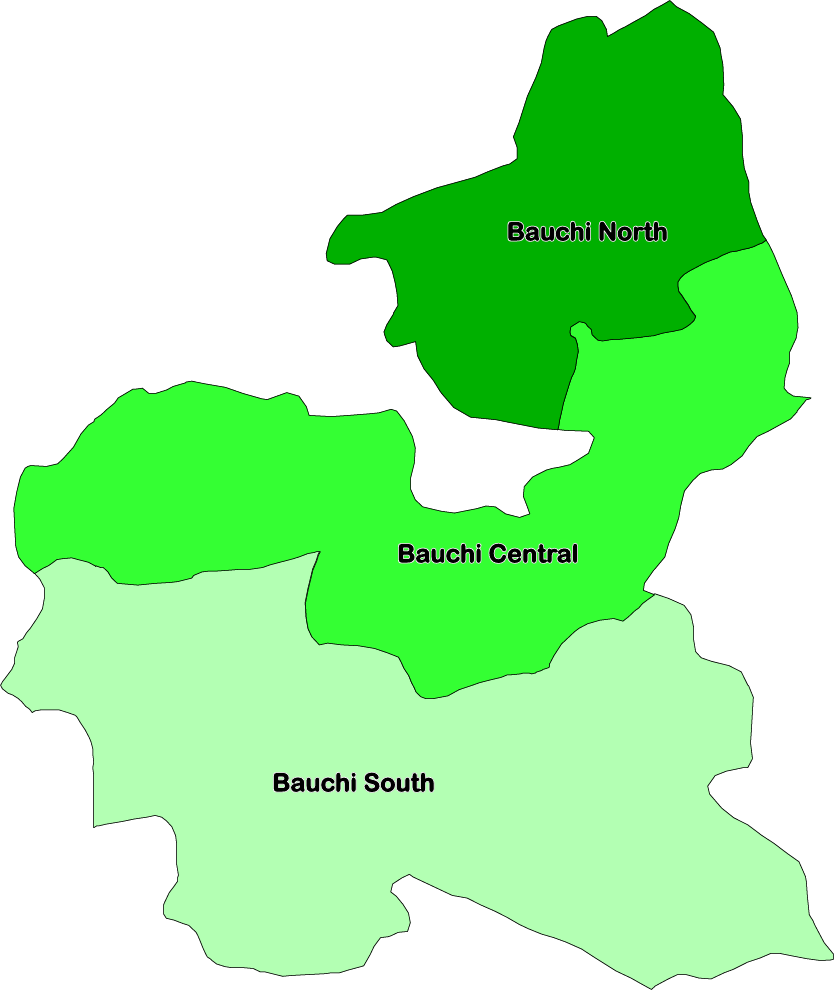
Bauchi State Map

Senatorial District	Constituency
Bauchi South	Alkaleri/Kirfi
Bauchi South	Bauchi
Bauchi South	Bogoro/Dass/Tafawa Balewa
Bauchi Central	Darazo/Gunjuwa
Bauchi North	Gamawa
Bauchi North	Jama'are/Itas-Gadau
Bauchi North	Katagum
Bauchi Central	Misau/Dambam
Bauchi Central	Ningi/Warji
Bauchi North	Shira/Giade
Bauchi South	Toro
Bauchi North	Zaki

== Bayelsa State – 5 seats ==
Bayelsa state is made up of 5 federal constituencies which covers 8 local government areas.

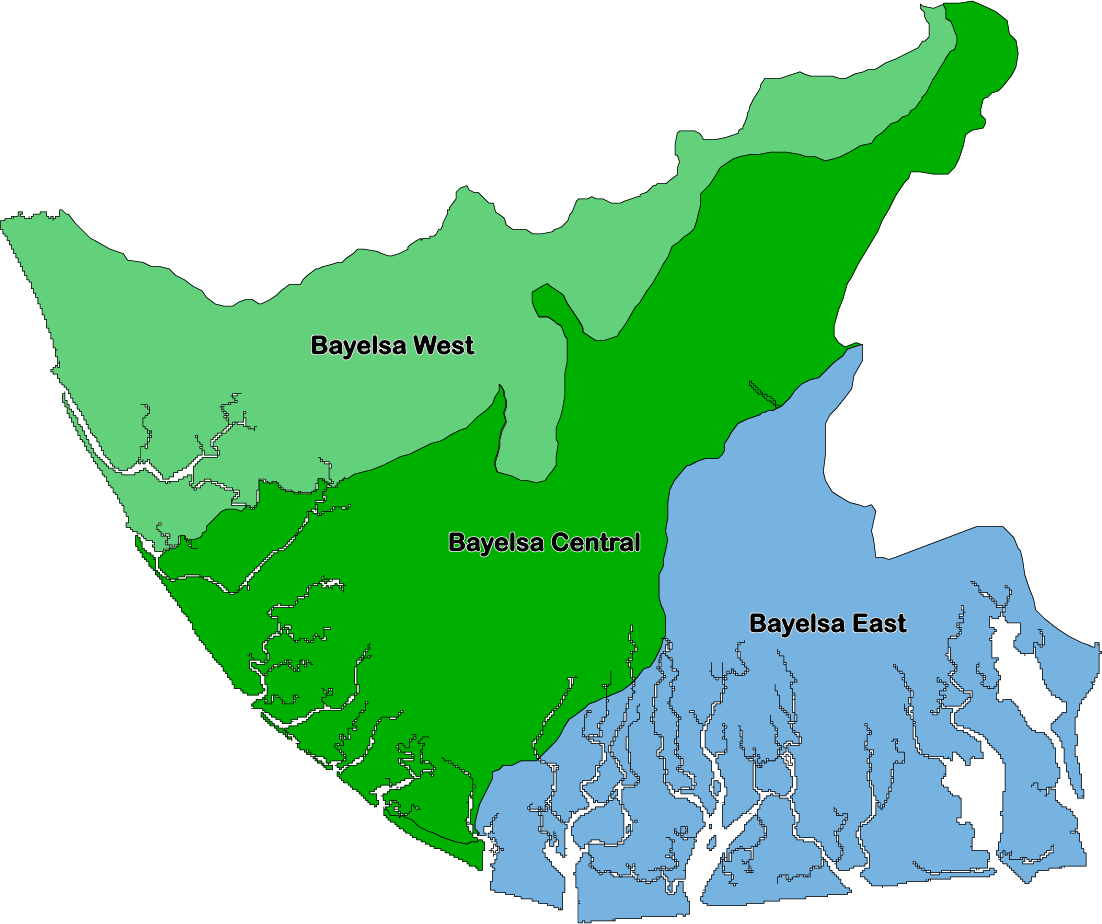
Map of Bayelsa State

Senatorial District	Constituency
Bayelsa East	Brass/Nembe
Bayelsa East	Ogbia
Bayelsa West	Sagbama/Ekeremor
Bayelsa Central	Southern Ijaw
Bayelsa Central	Yenagoa/Kolokuna/Opokuma

== Benue State – 11 seats ==
Benue state is made up of 11 federal constituencies which covers 23 local government areas.

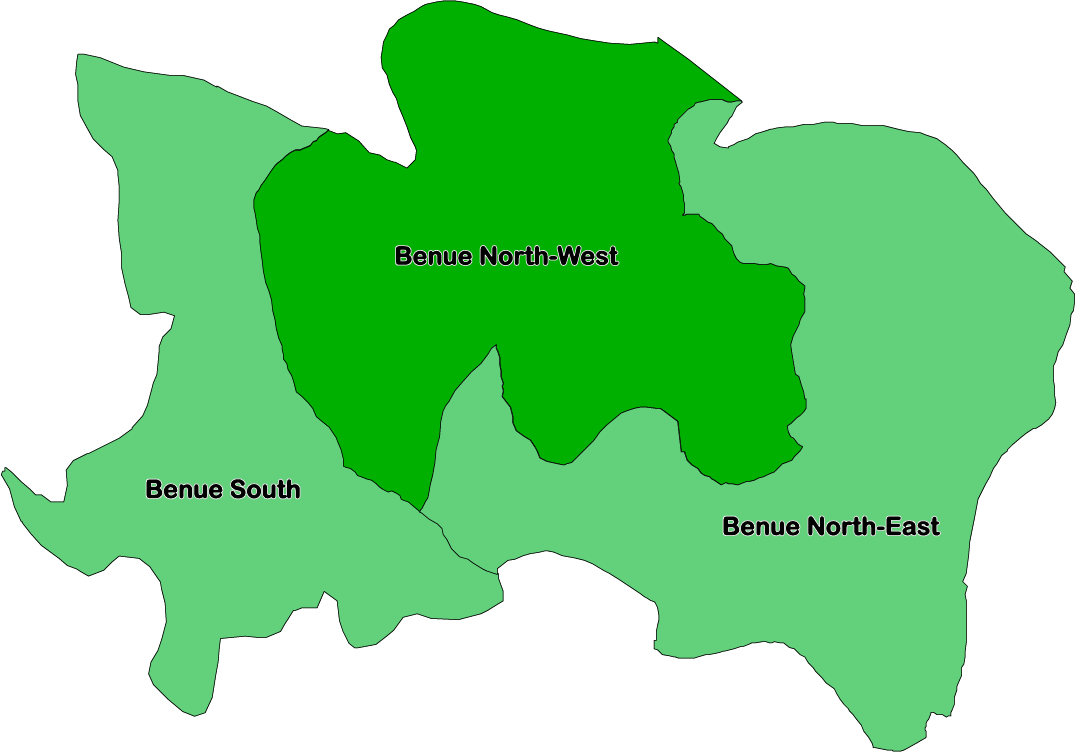
Benue State Map

Senatorial District	Constituency
Benue South	Ado/Obadigbo/Okpokwu
Benue South	Apa/Agatu
Benue North West	Buruku
Benue North West	Gboko/Tarka
Benue North West	Guma/Makurdi
Benue North West	Gwer East/Gwer West
Benue North East	Katsina-Ala/Ukum/Logo
Benue North East	Konshisha/Vandeikya
Benue North East	Kwande/Ushongo
Benue South	Oju/Obi
Benue South	Otukpo/Ohimini

== Borno State – 10 seats ==
Borno state is made up of 10 federal constituencies which covers 27 local government areas.

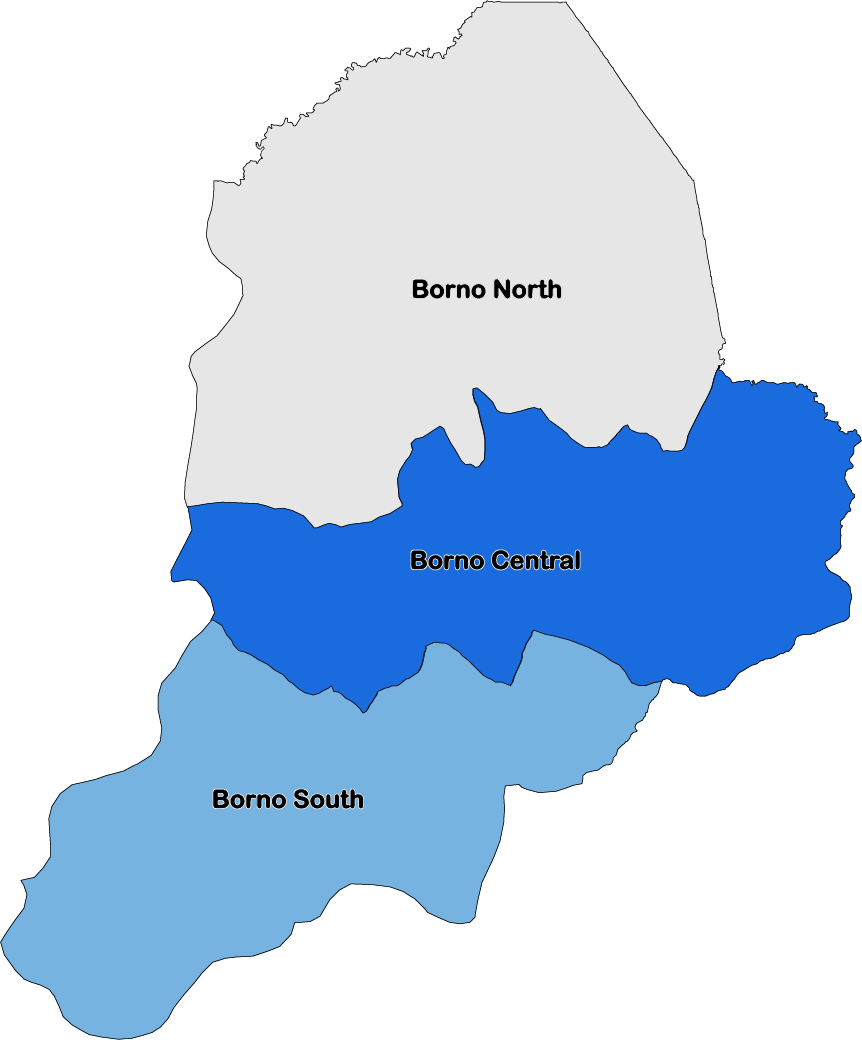
Borno State Map

Senatorial District	Constituency
Borno South	Askira-Uba/Hawul
Borno Central	Bama/Ngala/Kala-Balge
Borno South	Biu/Kwaya-Kusar Shani/Bayo
Borno South	Damboa/Gwoza/Chibok
Borno Central	Dikwa/Mafa/Konduga
Borno Central	Jere
Borno North	Kaga/Gubio/Magumeri
Borno North	Kukawa/Mobbar/Abadam/Guzamali
Borno Central	Maiduguri Metropolitan
Borno North	Monguno/Nganzai/Marte

== Cross River State – 8 seats ==
Cross River state is made up of 8 federal constituencies which covers 18 local government areas.

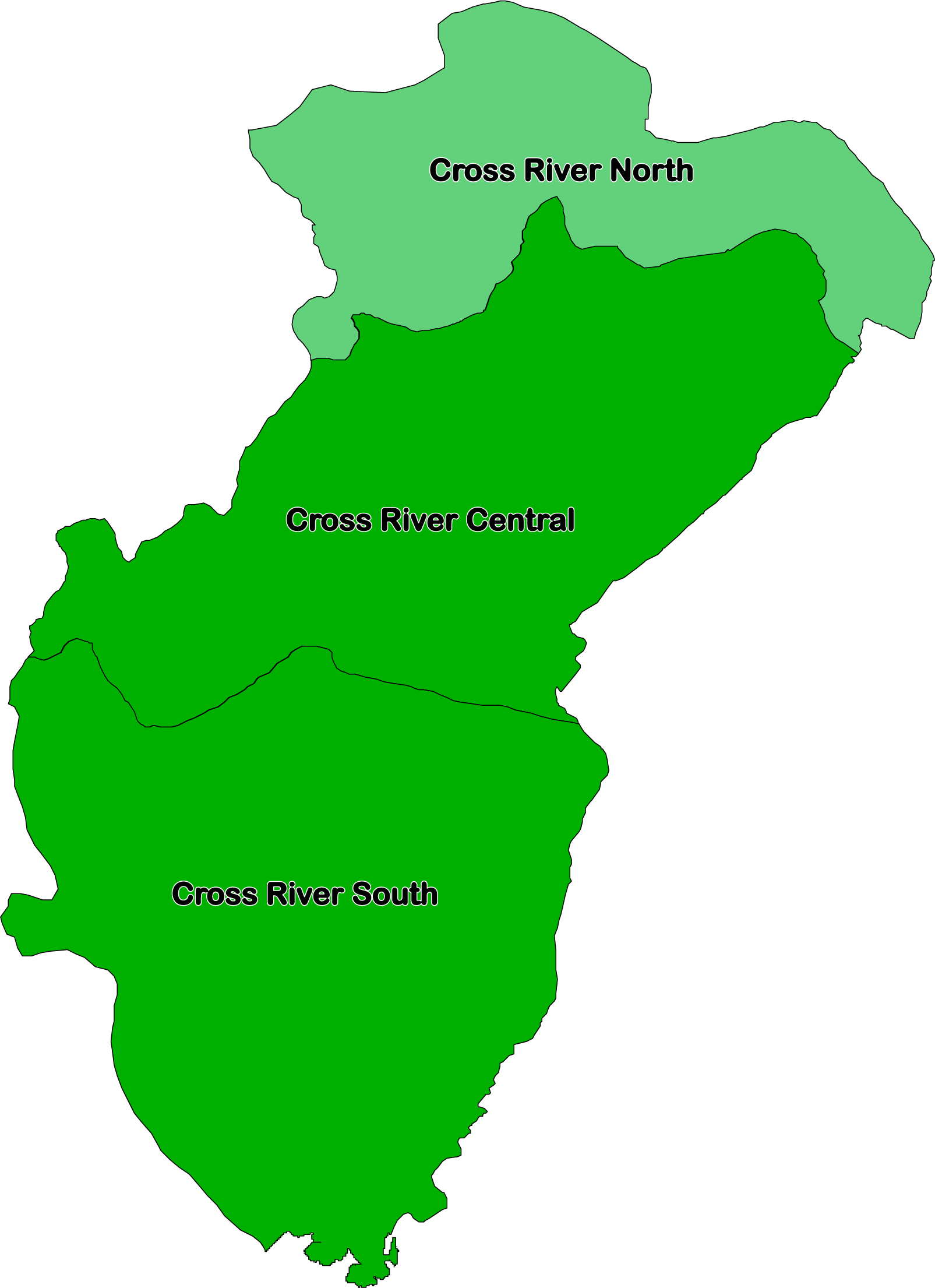
Cross River State Map

Senatorial District	Constituency
Cross River South	Akamkpa/Biase
Cross River Central	Boki/Ikom
Cross River South	Calabar South/Akpabuyo/Bakassi
Cross River South	Calabar Municipal/Odukpani
Cross River North	Obanliku/Obudu/Bekwarra
Cross River Central	Obubra/Etung
Cross River North	Ogoja/Yala
Cross River Central	Yakurr/Abi

== Delta State – 10 seats ==
Delta state is made up of 10 federal constituencies which covers 25 local government areas.

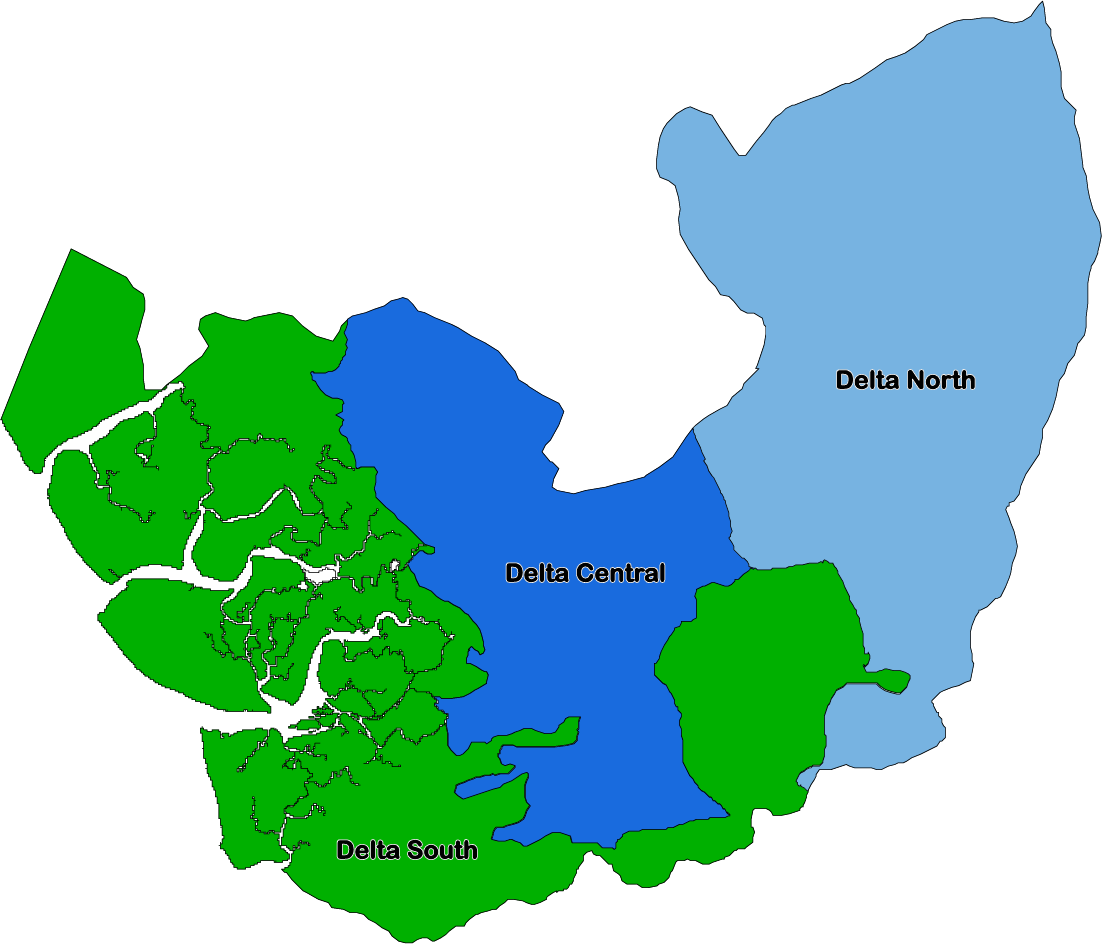
Map of Delta State

Senatorial District	Constituency
Delta North	Aniocha North/Aniocha South/Oshimili North/Oshimili South
Delta South	Bomadi/Patani
Delta South	Burutu
Delta Central	Ethiope East/Ethiope West
Delta North	Ika North East/Ika South
Delta South	Isoko North/Isoko South
Delta North	Nkokwa East/Ndokwa West/Ukwuani
Delta Central	Okpe/Sapele/Uvwie
Delta Central	Ughelli North/Ughelli South/Udu
Delta South	Warri North/Warri South/Warri South West

== Ebonyi State – 6 seats ==
Ebonyi state is made up of 6 federal constituencies which covers 13 local government areas.

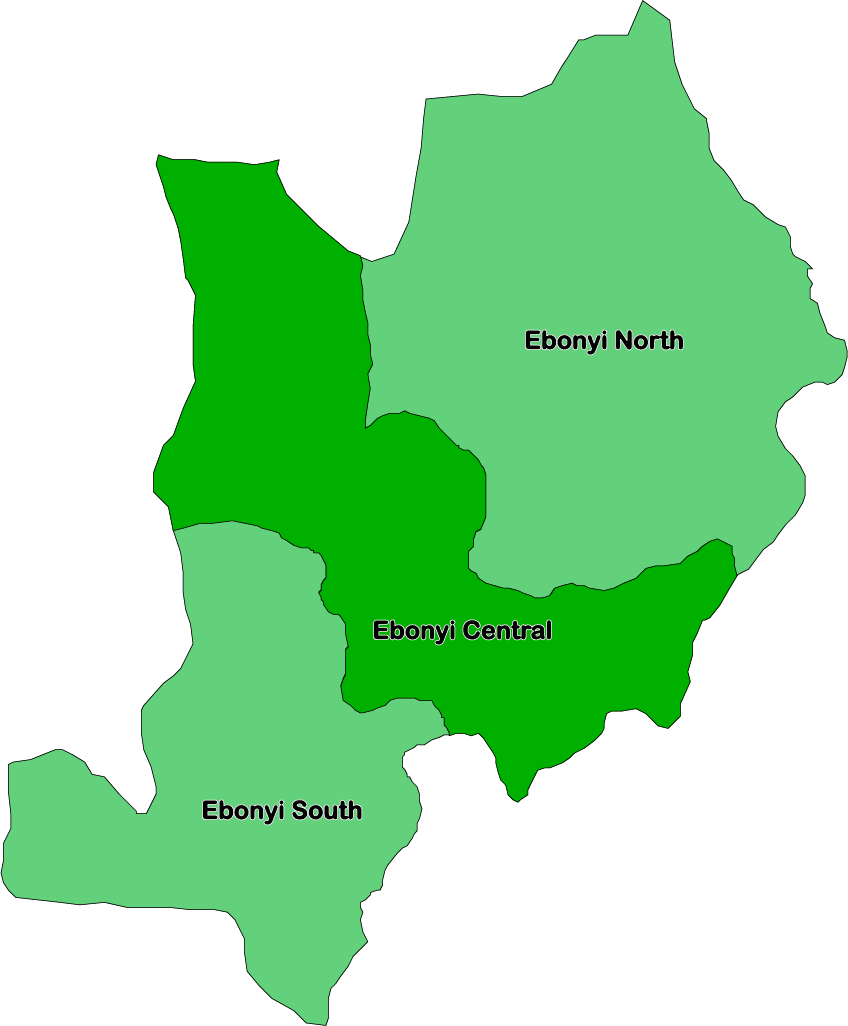
Map of Ebonyi State

Senatorial District	Constituency
Ebonyi North	Abakaliki/Izzi
Ebonyi South	Afikpo North/Afikpo South
Ebonyi North	Ebonyi/Ohaukwu
Ebonyi Central	Ezza North/Ishielu
Ebonyi Central	Ezza South/Ikwo
Ebonyi South	Ivo-Ohaozara/Onicha

== Edo State – 9 seats ==
Edo state is made up of 9 federal constituencies which covers 18 local government areas.

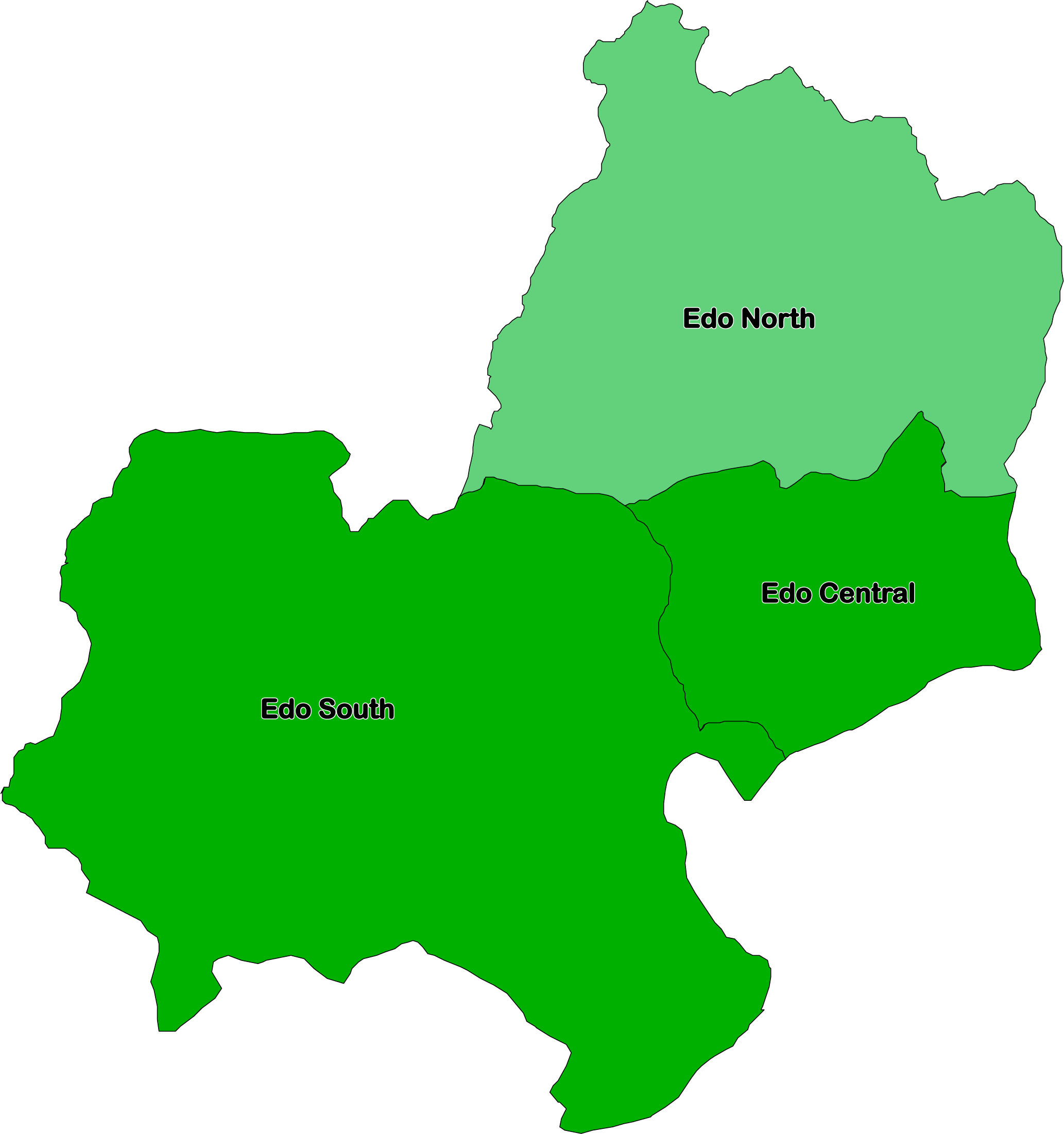
Edo State Map

Senatorial District	Constituency
Edo North	Akoko-Edo
Edo South	Egor/Ikpoba-Okha
Edo Central	Esan Central/Esan South/Igueben
Edo Central	Esan North East/Esan South East
Edo North	Etsako East/Etsako West/Etsako Central
Edo South	Oredo
Edo South	Orhionmwon/Uhunmwonde
Edo South	Ovia North East/Ovia South West
Edo North	Owan East/Owan West

== Ekiti State – 6 seats ==
Ekiti state is made up of 6 federal constituencies which covers 16 local government areas.

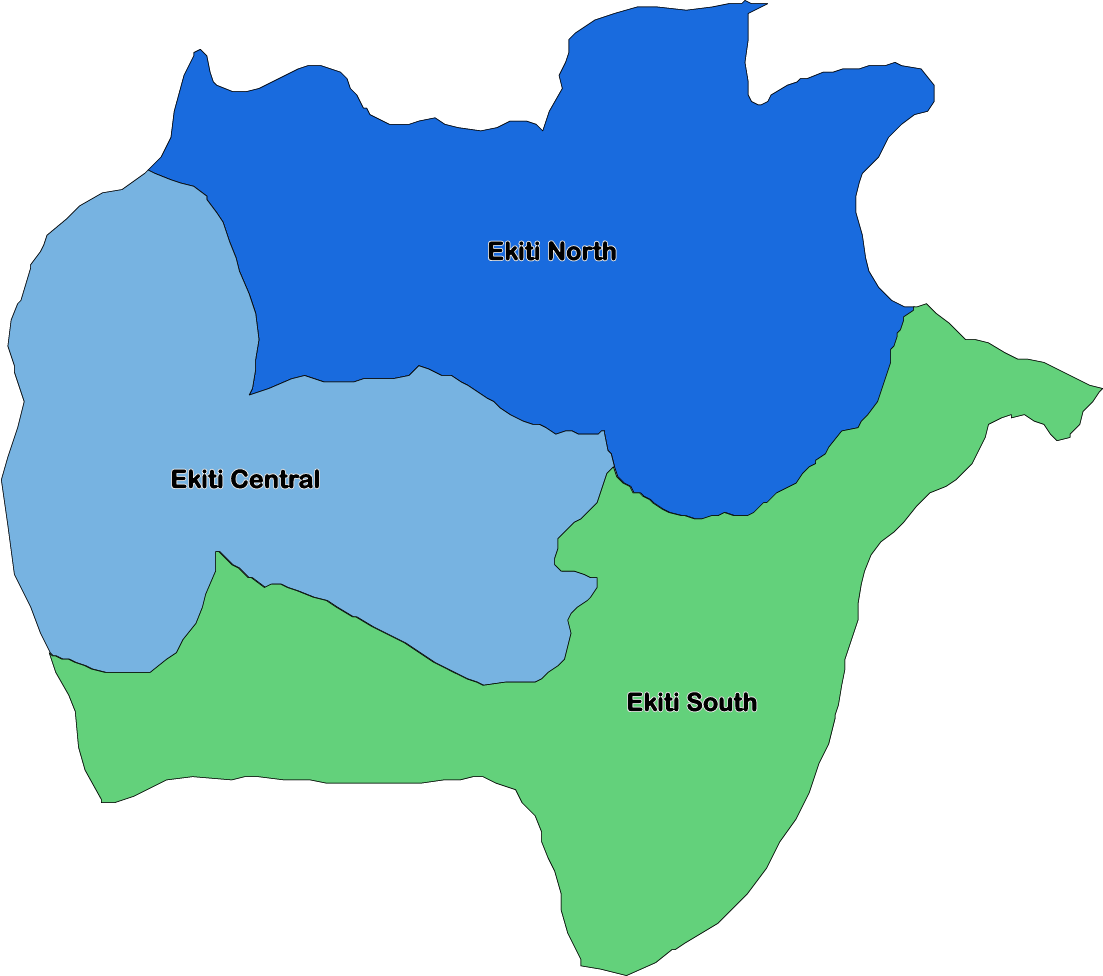
Map of Ekiti State

Senatorial District	Constituency
Ekiti Central	Ado Ekiti/Irepodun/Ifelodun
Ekiti South	Ekiti South West/Ikere/Orun/Ise
Ekiti South	Emure/Gbonyin/Ekiti East
Ekiti North	Ido/Osi Moba/Ilejeme
Ekiti Central	Ijero/Ekiti West/Efon
Ekiti North	Ikole/Oye

== Enugu State – 8 seats ==
Enugu state is made up of 8 federal constituencies which covers 17 local government areas.

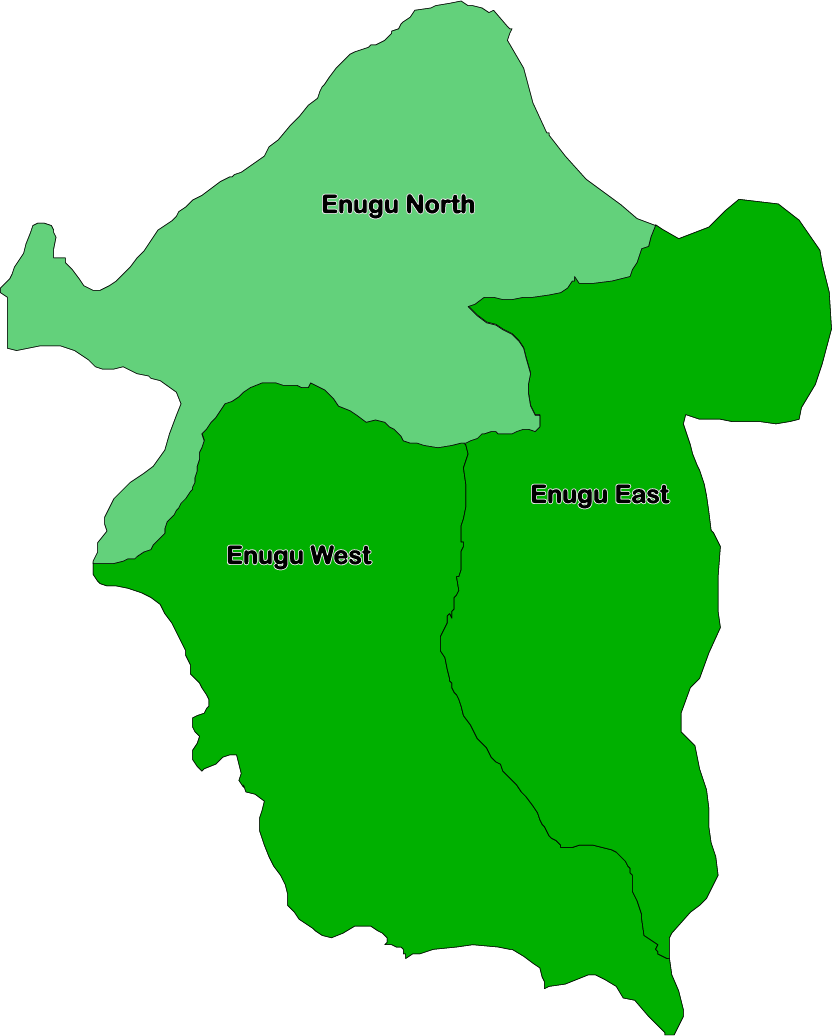
Enugu State Map

Senatorial District	Constituency
Enugu West	Aninri/Awgu/Oji River
Enugu East	Enugu East/Isi Uzo
Enugu East	Enugu North/Enugu South
Enugu West	Ezeagu/Udi
Enugu North	Igbo-Etiti/Uzo-Uwani
Enugu North	Igbo-Eze North/Udenu
Enugu East	Nkanu East/Nkanu West
Enugu North	Nsukka/Igbo-Eze South

== Gombe State – 6 seats ==
Gombe state is made up of 6 federal constituencies which covers 11 local government areas.

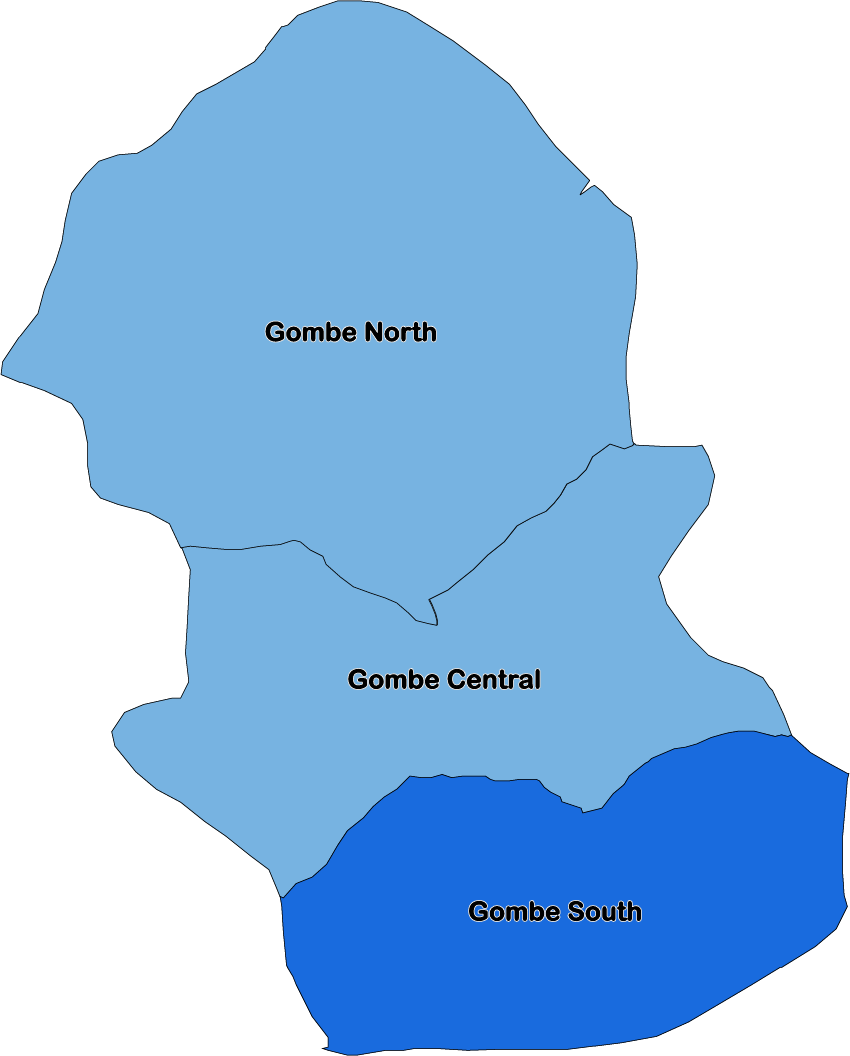
Map of Gombe State

Senatorial District	Constituency
Gombe Central	Akko
Gombe South	Balanga/Billiri
Gombe North	Dukku/Nafada
Gombe North	Gombe/Kwami/Funakaye
Gombe South	Kaltungo/Shongom
Gombe Central	Yamaltu/Deba

== Imo State – 10 seats ==
Imo state is made up of 10 federal constituencies which covers 27 local government areas.

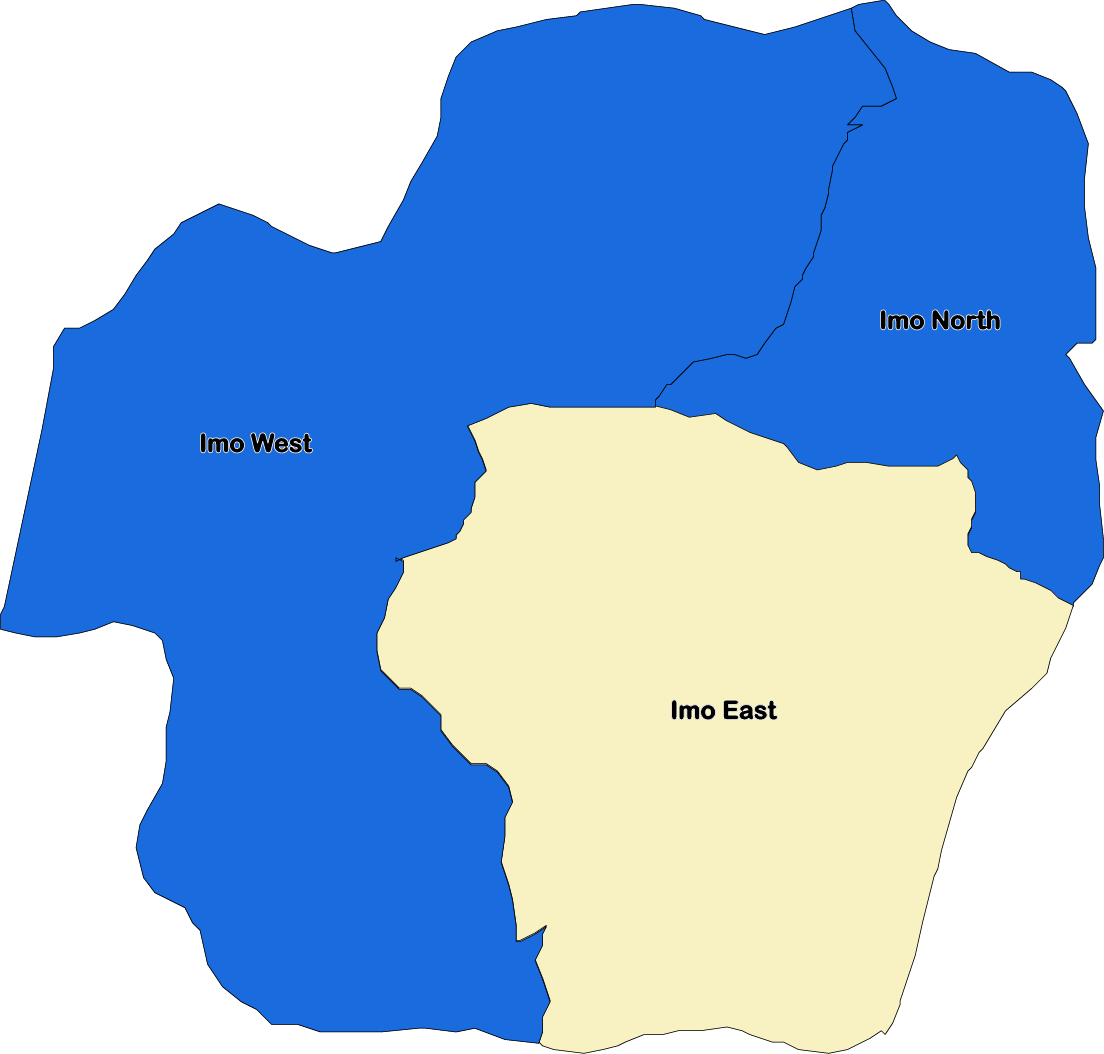
Imo State Map

Senatorial District	Constituency
Imo East	Aboh Mbaise/Ngor Okpala
Imo East	Ahiazu Mbaise/Ezinihitte
Imo North	Ehime Mbano/Ihite-Uboma/Obowo
Imo West	Ideato North/Ideato South
Imo East	Ikeduru/Mbaitoli
Imo North	Isiala Mbano/Okigwe/Onuimo
Imo West	Isu/Njaba/Nkwerre/Nwangele
Imo West	Oguta/Ohaji-Egbema/Oru West
Imo West	Oru East/Orsu/Orlu
Imo East	Owerri Municipal/Owerri North/Owerri West

== Jigawa State – 11 seats ==
Jigawa state is made up of 11 federal constituencies which covers 27 local government areas.

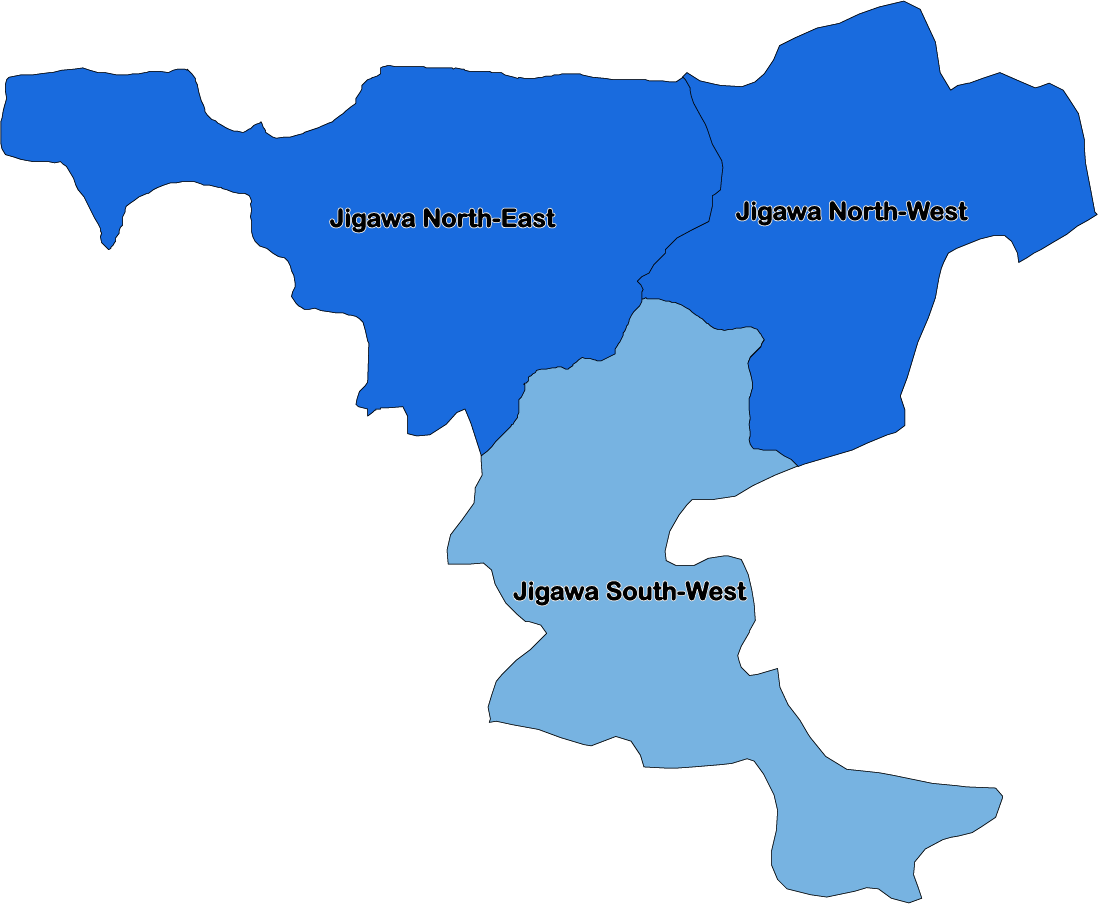
Jigawa State Map

Senatorial District	Constituency
Jigawa North West	Babura/Garki
Jigawa South West	Birnin Kudu/Buji
Jigawa South West	Birniwa Guri/Kirikasamma
Jigawa South West	Dutse/Kiyawa
Jigawa North West	Gumel/Maigatari/Sule Tankarkar/Gagarawa
Jigawa South West	Gwaram
Jigawa North East	Hadejia/Kafin Hausa
Jigawa South West	Jahun/Miga
Jigawa North West	Kazaure/Roni/Gwiwa/Yankwashi
Jigawa North East	Mallam Madori/Kaugama
Jigawa North West	Ringim/Taura

== Kaduna State – 16 seats ==
Kaduna state is made up of 16 federal constituencies which covers 23 local government areas.

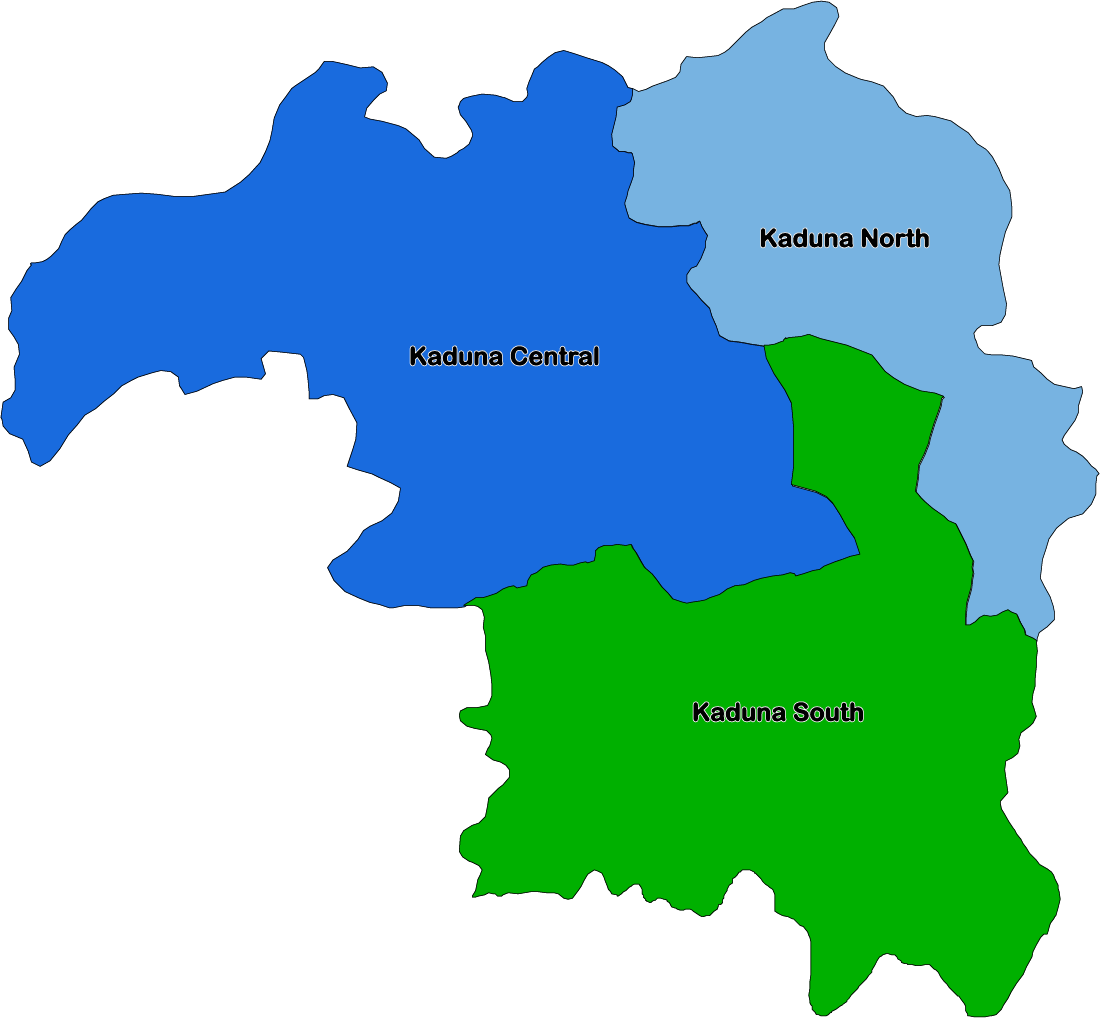
Kaduna State Map

Senatorial District	Constituency
Kaduna Central	Birnin Gwari/Giwa
Kaduna Central	Chikun/Kajuru
Kaduna Central	Igabi
Kaduna North	Ikara/Kubau
Kaduna South	Jemaa/Sanga
Kaduna South	Kachia/Kagarko
Kaduna Central	Kaduna North
Kaduna Central	Kaduna South
Kaduna South	Kaura
Kaduna South	Kauru
Kaduna North	Lere
Kaduna North	Makarfi/Kudan
Kaduna North	Sabon Gari
Kaduna North	Soba
Kaduna South	Zangon Kataf/Jaba
Kaduna North	Zaria

== Kano State – 24 seats ==
Kano state is made up of 24 federal constituencies which covers 44 local government areas.

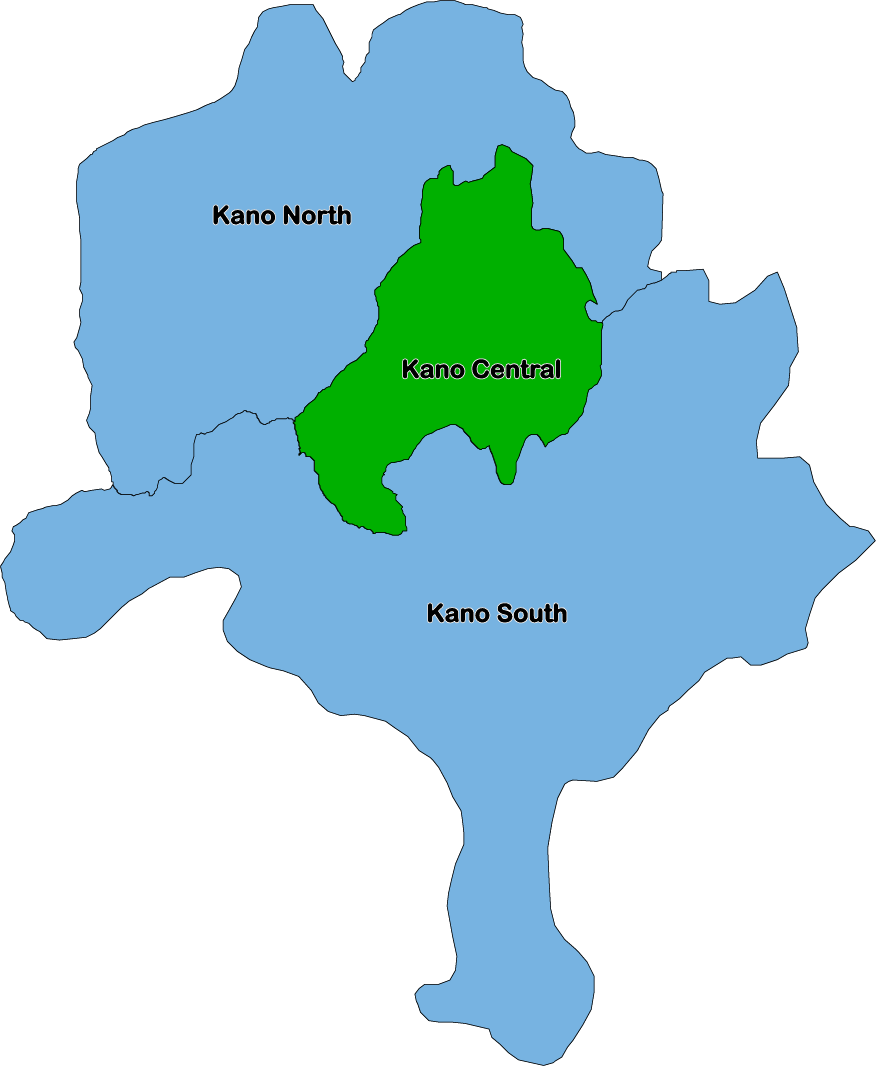
Map of Kano State

Senatorial District	Constituency
Kano South	Alabasu/Gaya/Ajingi
Kano North	Bagwai/Shanono
Kano South	Bebeji/Kiru
Kano North	Bichi
Kano Central	Dala
Kano North	Dambatta/Makoda
Kano Central	Dawakin Kudu/Warawa
Kano North	Dawakin Tofa/Tofa/Rimin Gado
Kano South	Doguwa/Tudun Wada
Kano Central	Fagge
Kano Central	Gezawa/Gabasawa
Kano Central	Gwale
Kano North	Gwarzo/Ikabo
Kano Central	Kano Municipal
Kano South	Karaye/Rogo
Kano Central	Kumbotso
Kano Central	Kura/Madobi/Garun Mallam
Kano Central	Minjibir/Ungogo
Kano Central	Nassarawa
Kano South	Rano/Bunkure/Kibiya
Kano South	Sumaila/Takai
Kano Central	Tarauni
Kano North	Tsanyawa/Kunchi
Kano South	Wudil/Garko

== Katsina State – 15 seats ==
Katsina state is made up of 15 federal constituencies which covers 34 local government areas.

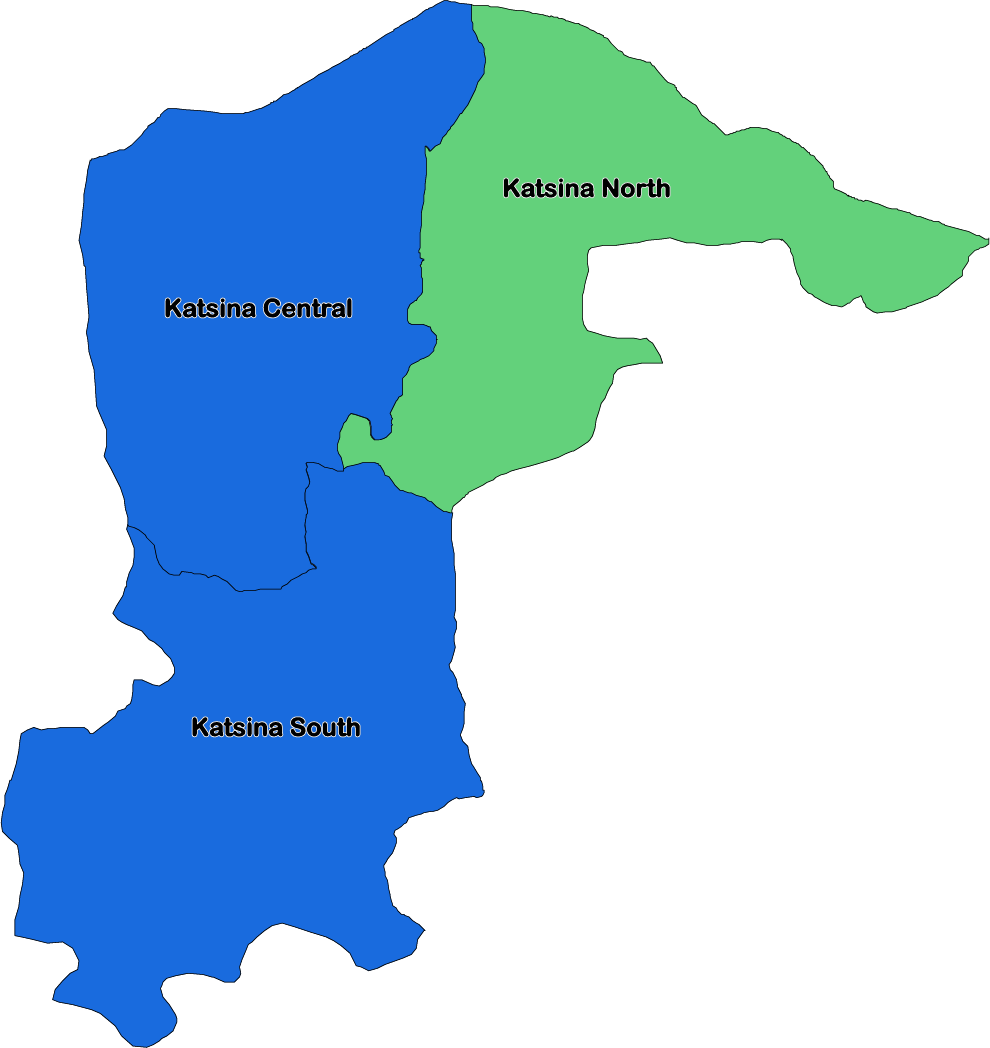
Map of Katsina State

Senatorial District	Constituency
Katsina South	Bakori/Danja
Katsina Central	Batagarawa/Charanchi/Rimi
Katsina Central	Batsari/Safana/Danmusa
Katsina North	Bindawa/Mani
Katsina North	Daura/Sandamu/Maiadua
Katsina Central	Dutsin-Ma/Kurfi
Katsina South	Faskari/Kankara/Sabuwa
Katsina South	Funtua/Dandume
Katsina North	Ingawa/Kankia/Kusada
Katsina Central	Jibia/Kaita
Katsina Central	Katsina
Katsina South	Malumfashi/Kafur
Katsina North	Mashi/Dutsi
Katsina South	Matazu/Musawa
Katsina North	Zango/Baure

== Kebbi State – 8 seats ==
Kebbi state is made up of 8 federal constituencies which covers 21 local government areas.

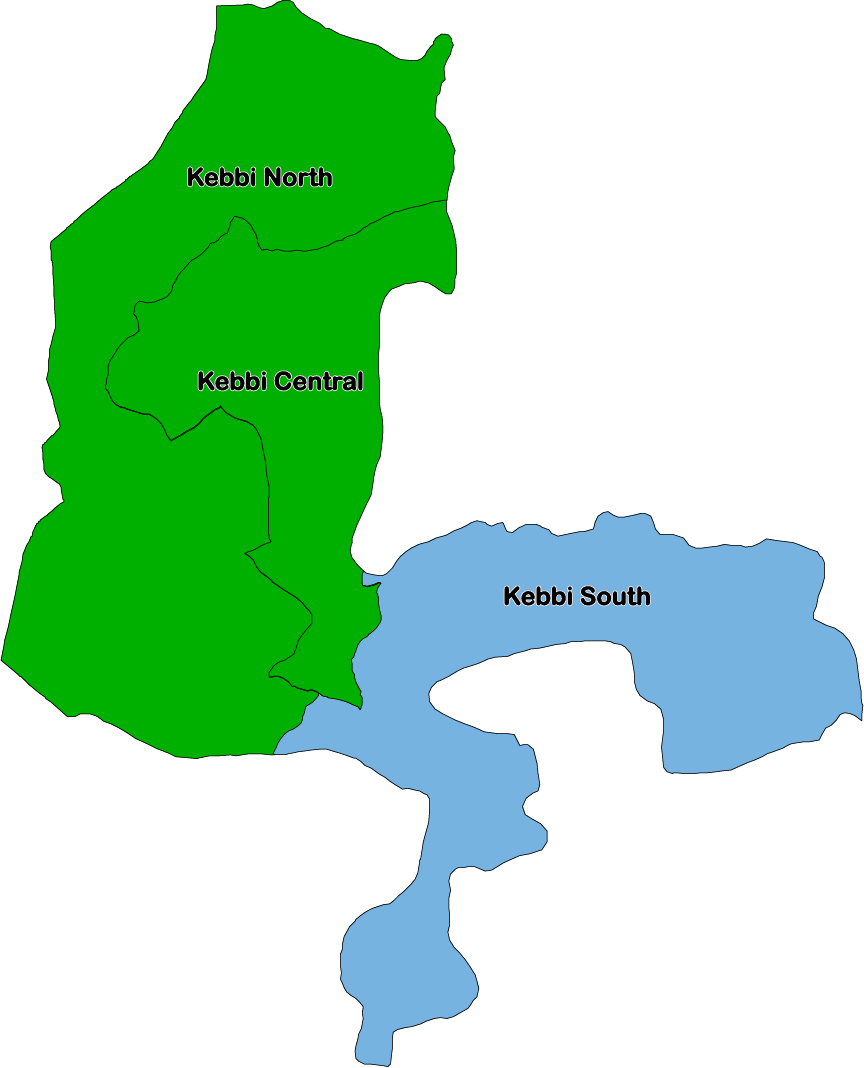
Map of Kebbi State

Senatorial District	Constituency
Kebbi Central	Aleiro/Gwandu/Jega
Kebbi North	Arewa/Dandi
Kebbi North	Argungu/Augie
Kebbi North	Bagudo/Suru
Kebbi Central	Bunza/Birnin Kebbi/Kalgo
Kebbi South	Fakai/Sakaba/Wasagu/Danko/Zuru
Kebbi Central	Koko-Besse/Maiyama
Kebbi South	Ngaski/Shanga/Yauri

== Kogi State – 9 seats ==
Kogi state is made up of 9 federal constituencies which covers 21 local government areas.

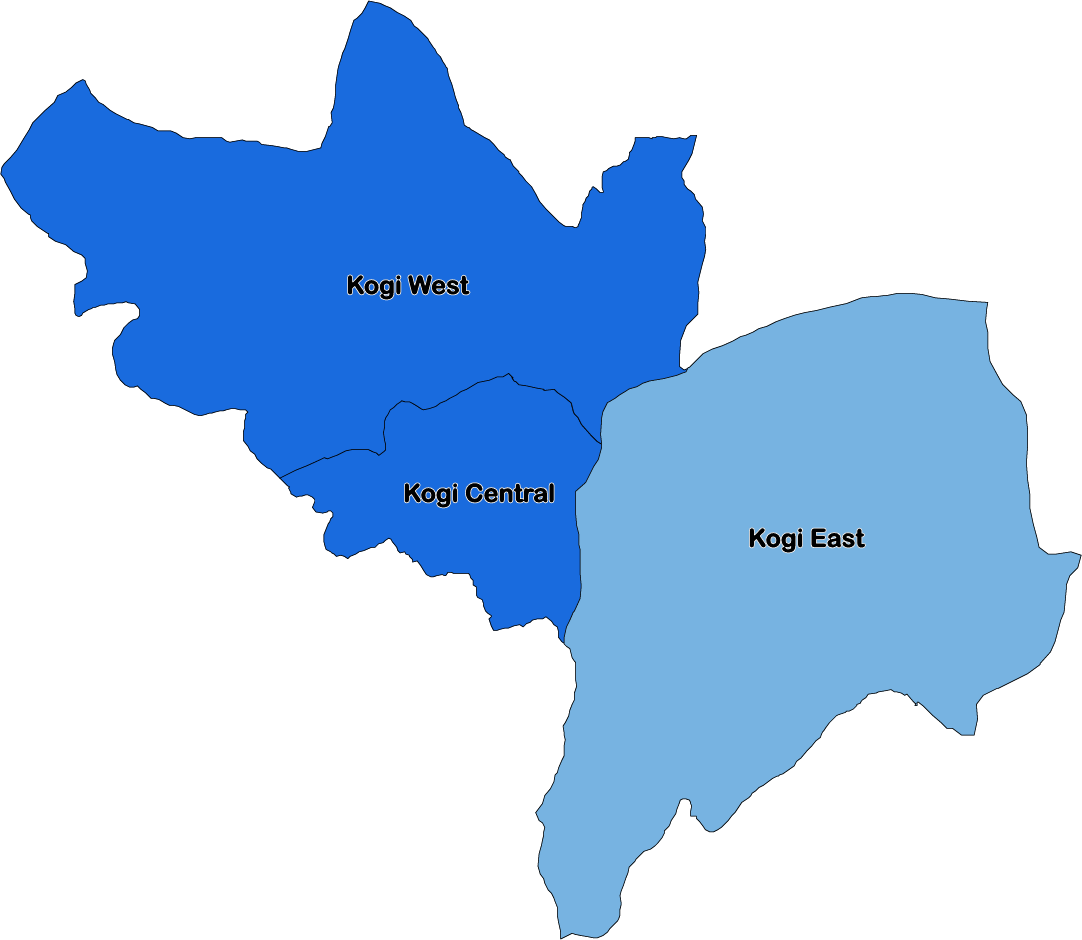
Map of Kogi State

Senatorial District	Constituency
Kogi Central	Adavi/Okehi
Kogi Central	Ajaokuta
Kogi East	Ankpa/Omala/Olamaboro
Kogi East	Bassa/Dekina
Kogi East	Idah/Igalamela Odolu/Ibaji/Ofu
Kogi West	Ijumu/Kabba-Bunu
Kogi West	Lokoja/Koton Karfe
Kogi Central	Okene/Ogori-Magogo
Kogi West	Yagba East/Yagba West/Mopamuro

== Kwara State – 6 seats ==
Kwara state is made up of 6 federal constituencies which covers 16 local government areas.

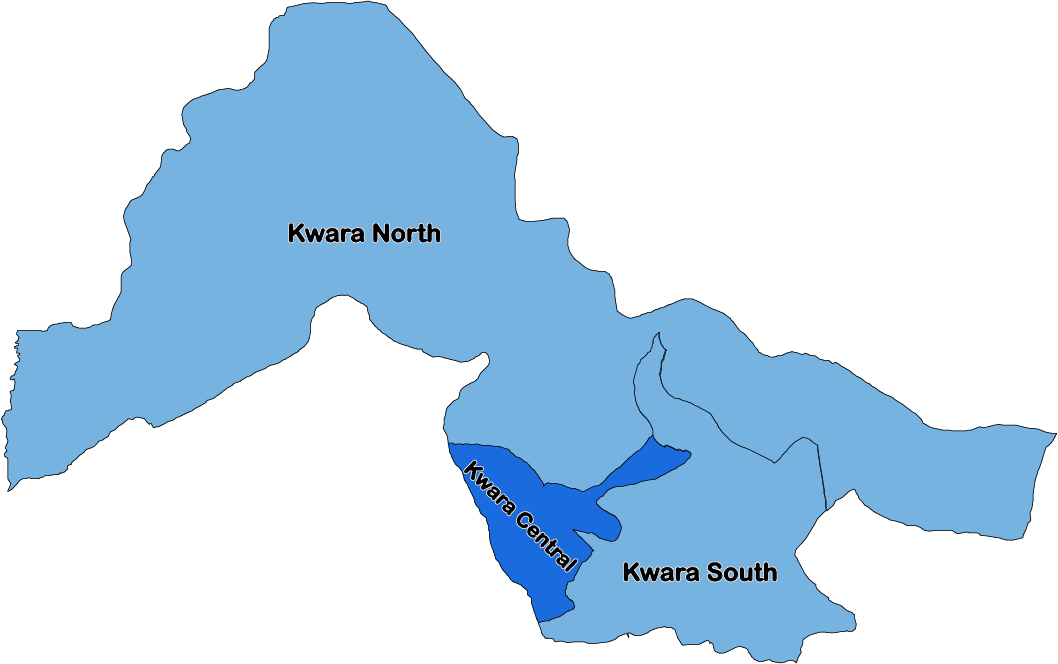
Map of Kwara State

Senatorial District	Constituency
Kwara North	Baruten/Kaiama
Kwara North	Edu/Moro/Pategi
Kwara South	Ekiti/Isin/Irepodun/Oke-Ero
Kwara South	Ifelodun/Offa/Oyun
Kwara Central	Ilorin East/Ilorin South
Kwara Central	Ilorin West/Asa

== Lagos State – 24 seats ==
Lagos state is made up of 24 federal constituencies which covers 20 local government areas.

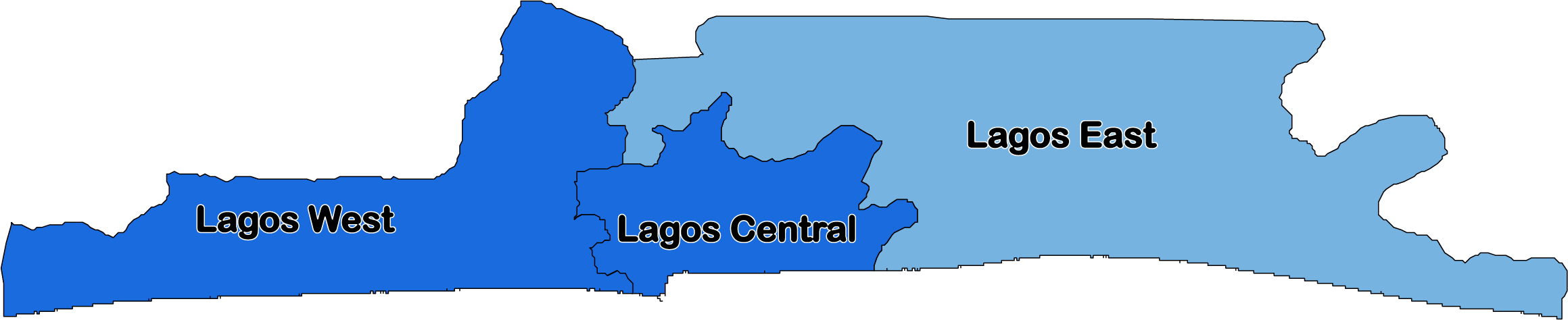
Map of Lagos State

Senatorial District	Constituency
Lagos West	Agege
Lagos West	Ajeromi/Ifelodun
Lagos West	Alimosho
Lagos West	Amuwo-Odofin
Lagos Central	Apapa
Lagos West	Badagry
Lagos East	Epe
Lagos Central	Eti-Osa
Lagos East	Ibeju Lekki
Lagos West	Ifako-Ijaiye
Lagos West	Ikeja
Lagos East	Ikorodu
Lagos East	Kosofe
Lagos Central	Lagos Mainland
Lagos Central	Lagos Island I
Lagos Central	Lagos Island II
Lagos West	Mushin I
Lagos West	Mushin II
Lagos West	Ojo
Lagos West	Oshodi/Isolo I
Lagos West	Oshodi/Isolo II
Lagos East	Shomolu
Lagos Central	Surulere I
Lagos Central	Surulere II

== Nasarawa State – 5 seats ==
Nasarawa state is made up of 5 federal constituencies which covers 13 local government areas.

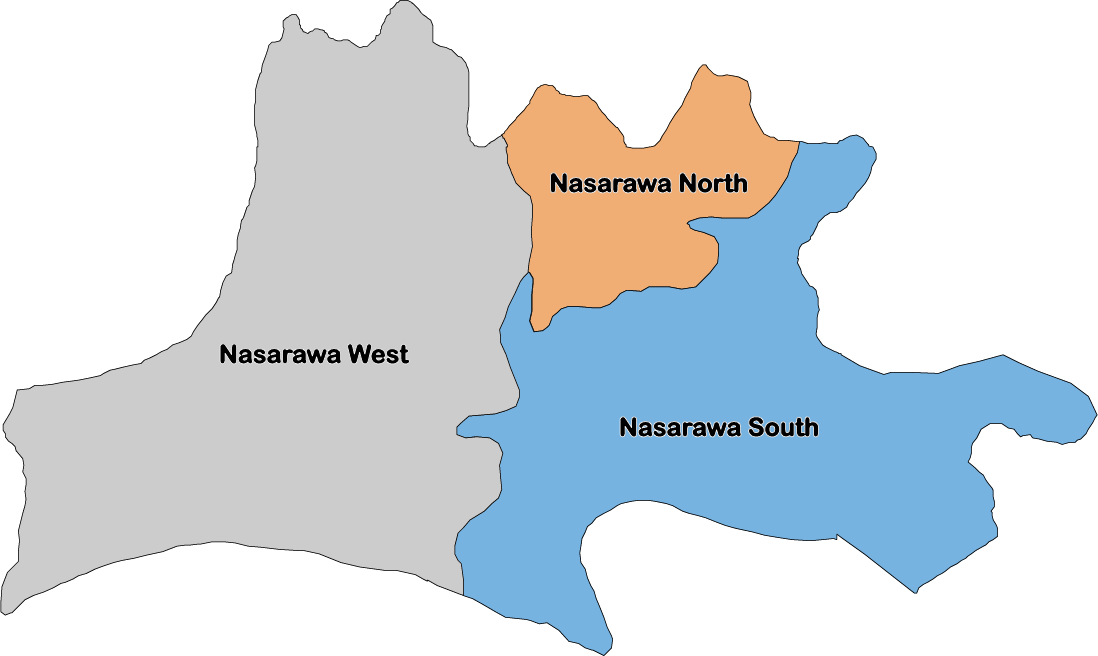
Map of Nasarawa State

Senatorial District	Constituency
Nasarawa North	Akwanga/Nassarawa Eggon/Wamba
Nasarawa South	Awe/Doma/Keana
Nasarawa West	Keffi/Karu/Kokona
Nasarawa South	Lafia/Obi
Nasarawa West	Nassarawa/Toto

== Niger State – 10 seats ==
Niger state is made up of 10 federal constituencies which covers 25 local government areas.

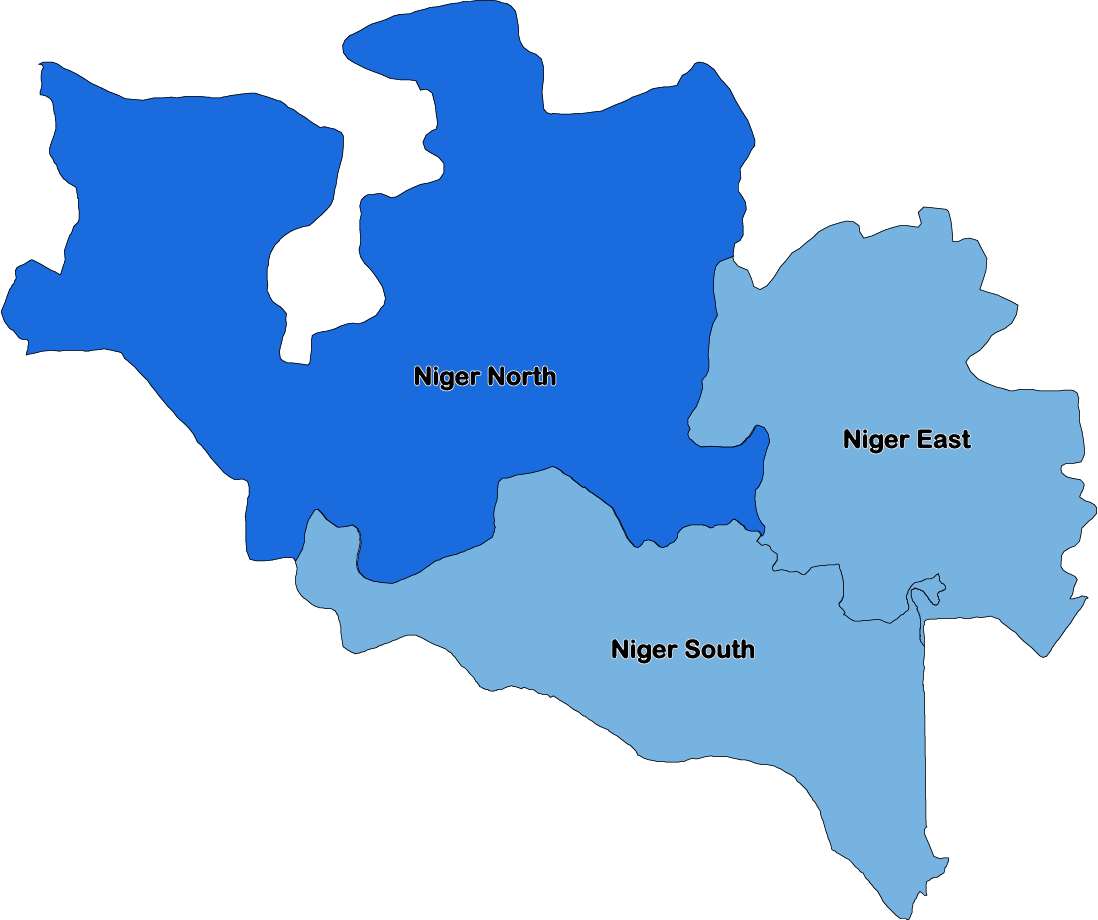
Map of Niger State

Senatorial District	Constituency
Niger South	Agaie/Lapai
Niger North	Agwara/Borgu
Niger South	Bida/Gbako/Katcha
Niger East	Booso/Paikoro
Niger East	Chanchaga
Niger East	Gurara/Suleja/Tapa
Niger North	Kontagora/Wushishi/Mariga/Mashegu
Niger South	Lavun/Mokwa/Edati
Niger North	Magama/Rijau
Niger East	Shiroro/Rafi/Munya

== Ogun State – 9 seats ==
Ogun state is made up of 9 federal constituencies which covers 20 local government areas.

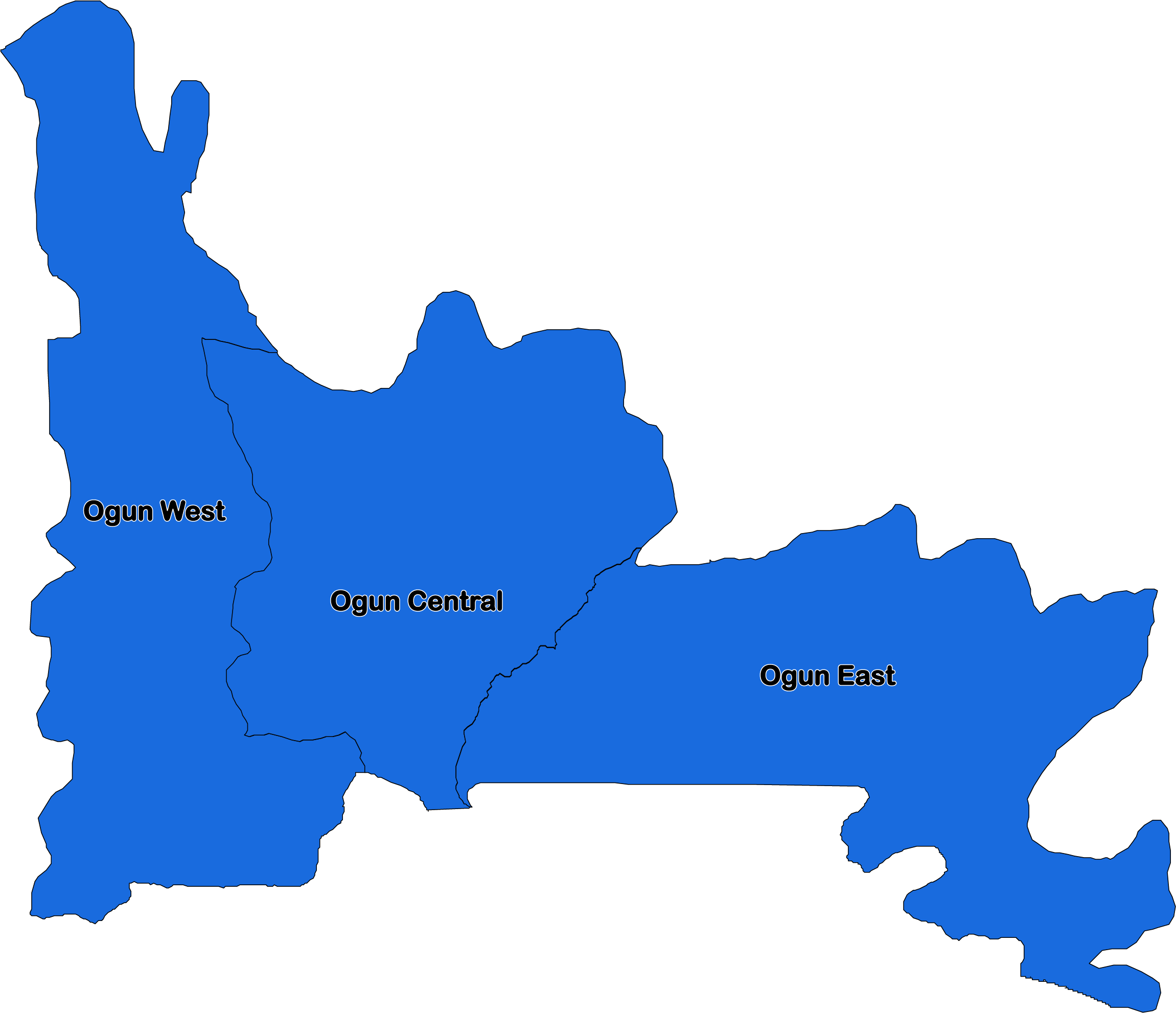
Map of Ogun State

Senatorial District	Constituency
Ogun Central	Abeokuta North/Obafemi-Owode/Odeda
Ogun Central	Abeokuta South
Ogun West	Ado-Odo/Ota
Ogun West	Egbado North/Imeko-Afon
Ogun West	Egbado South/Ipokia
Ogun Central	Ifo/Ewekoro
Ogun East	Ijebu North/Ijebu East/Ogun Waterside
Ogun East	Ijebu Ode/Odogbolu/Ijebu North East
Ogun East	Ikenne/Shagamu/Remo North

== Ondo State – 9 seats ==
Ondo state is made up of 9 federal constituencies which covers 18 local government areas.

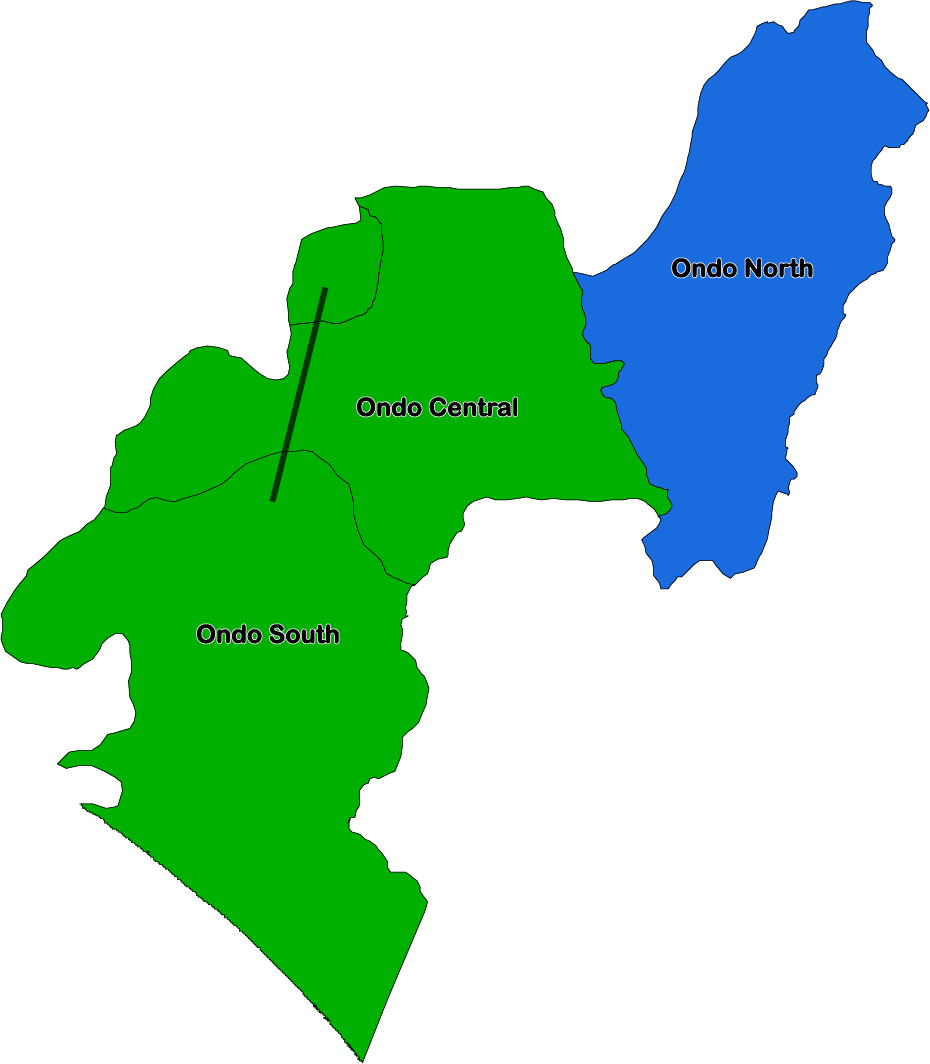
Map of Ondo State

Senatorial District	Constituency
Ondo North	Akoko North East/Akoko North West
Ondo North	Akoko South East/Akoko South West
Ondo Central	Akure North/Akure South
Ondo South	Eseodo/Ilaje
Ondo Central	Idanre/Ifedore
Ondo South	Ileoluji/Okeigbo/Odigbo
Ondo South	Okitipupa/Irele
Ondo Central	Ondo East/Ondo West
Ondo North	Owo/Ose

== Osun State – 9 seats ==
Osun state is made up of 9 federal constituencies which covers 30 local government areas.

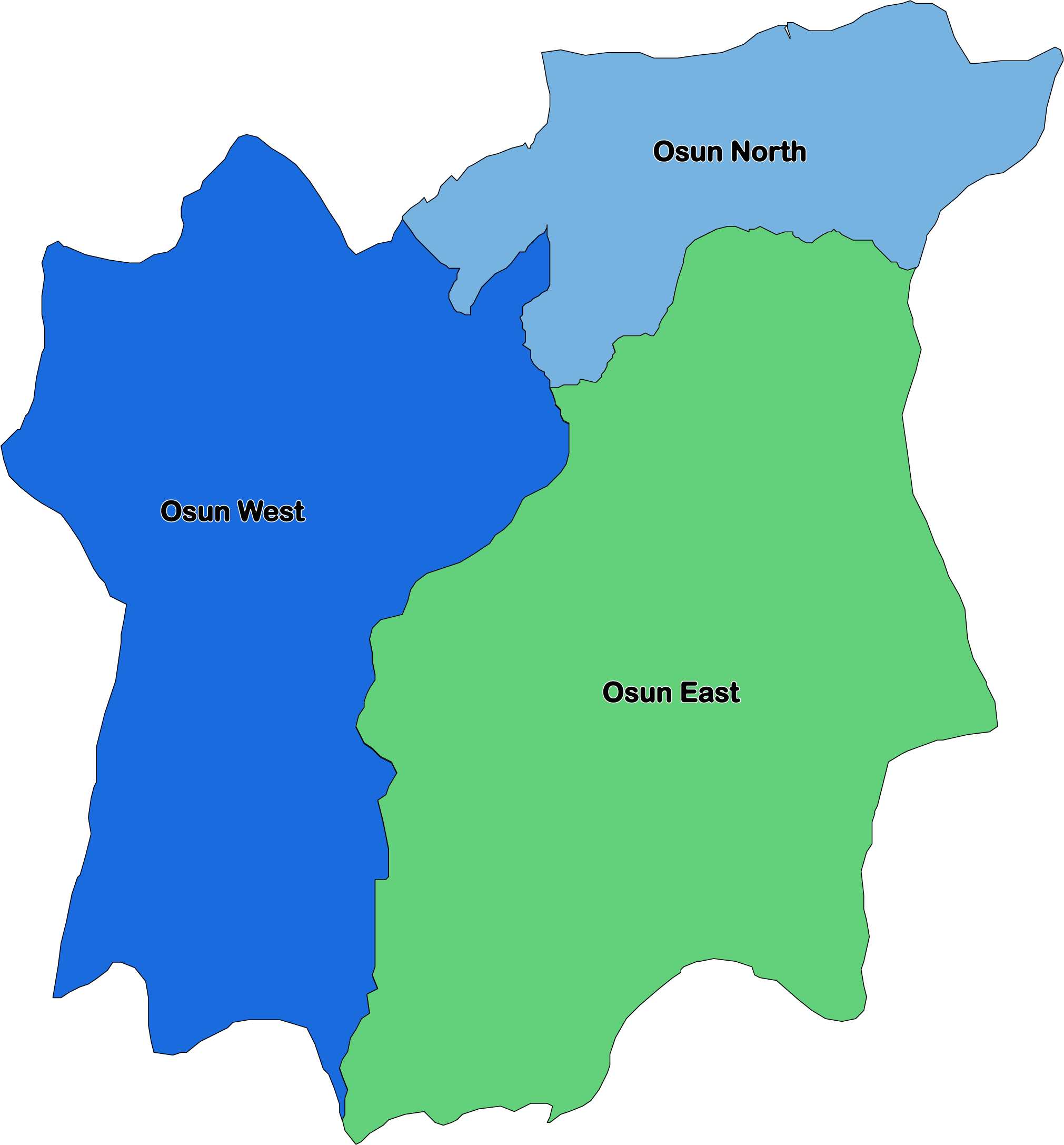
Map of Osun State

Senatorial District	Constituency
Osun East	Atakunmosa East/Atakunmosa West/Ilesha East/Ilesha West
Osun West	Ayedaade/Irewole/Isokan
Osun West	Ayedire/Iwo/Ola-Oluwa
Osun Central	Boluwaduro/Ifedayo/Ila
Osun West	Ede North/Ede South/Egbedore/Ejigbo
Osun East	Ife Central/Ife North/Ife South/Ife East
Osun Central	Irepodun/Olorunda/Osogbo/Orolu
Osun East	Obokun/Oriade
Osun Central	Odo-Otin/Ifelodun/Boripe

== Oyo State – 14 seats ==
Oyo state is made up of 14 federal constituencies which covers 33 local government areas.

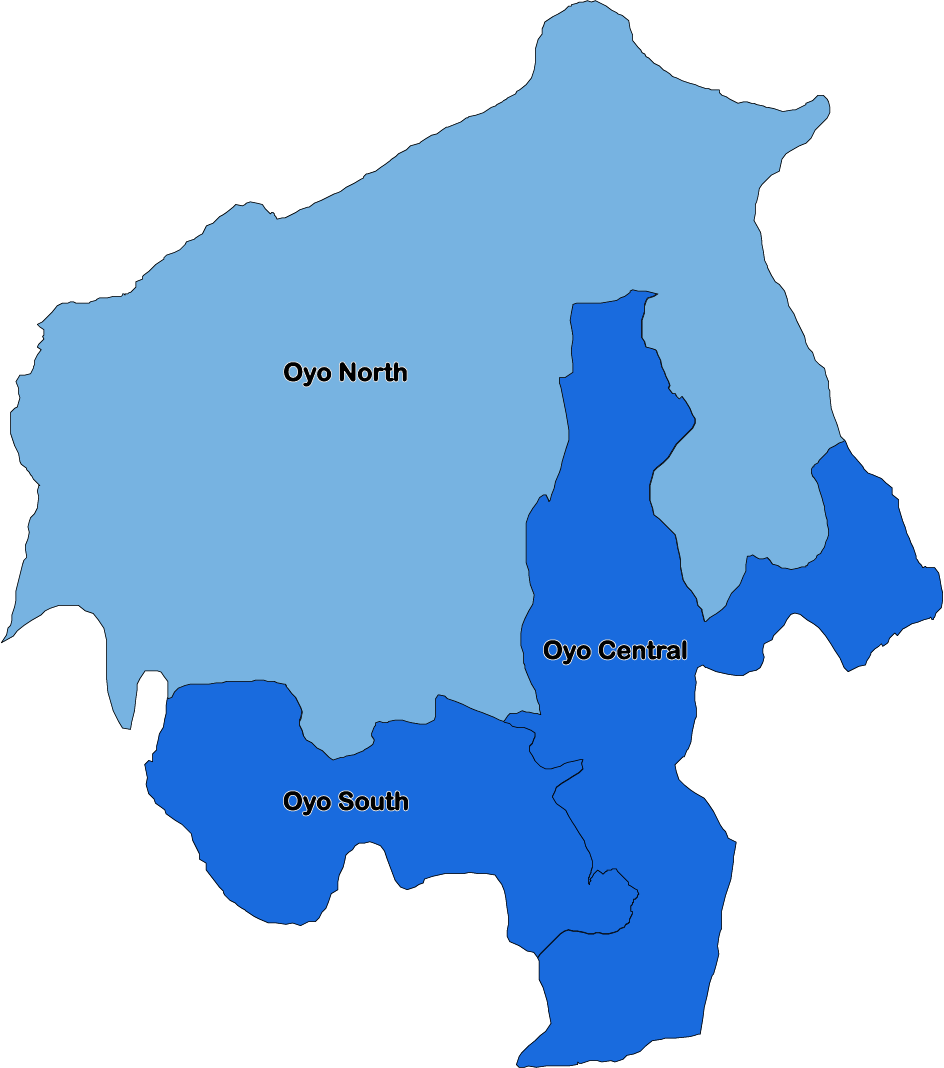
Map of Oyo State

Senatorial District	Constituency
Oyo Central	Afijio/Atiba/Oyo East/Oyo West
Oyo Central	Akinyele/Lagelu
Oyo North	Atisbo/Saki East/Saki West
Oyo Central	Egbeda/Ona-Ara
Oyo South	Ibadan North East/Ibadan South East
Oyo South	Ibadan North
Oyo South	Ibadan North West/Ibadan South West
Oyo South	Ibarapa Central/Ibarapa North
Oyo South	Ibarapa East/Ido
Oyo North	Irepo/Olurunsogo/Orelope
Oyo North	Iseyin/Kajola/Iwajowa/Itesiwaju
Oyo North	Ogbomoso North/Ogbomoso South/Orire
Oyo Central	Ogo-Oluwa/Surulere
Oyo Central	Oluyole

== Plateau State – 8 seats ==
Plateau state is made up of 8 federal constituencies which covers 17 local government areas.

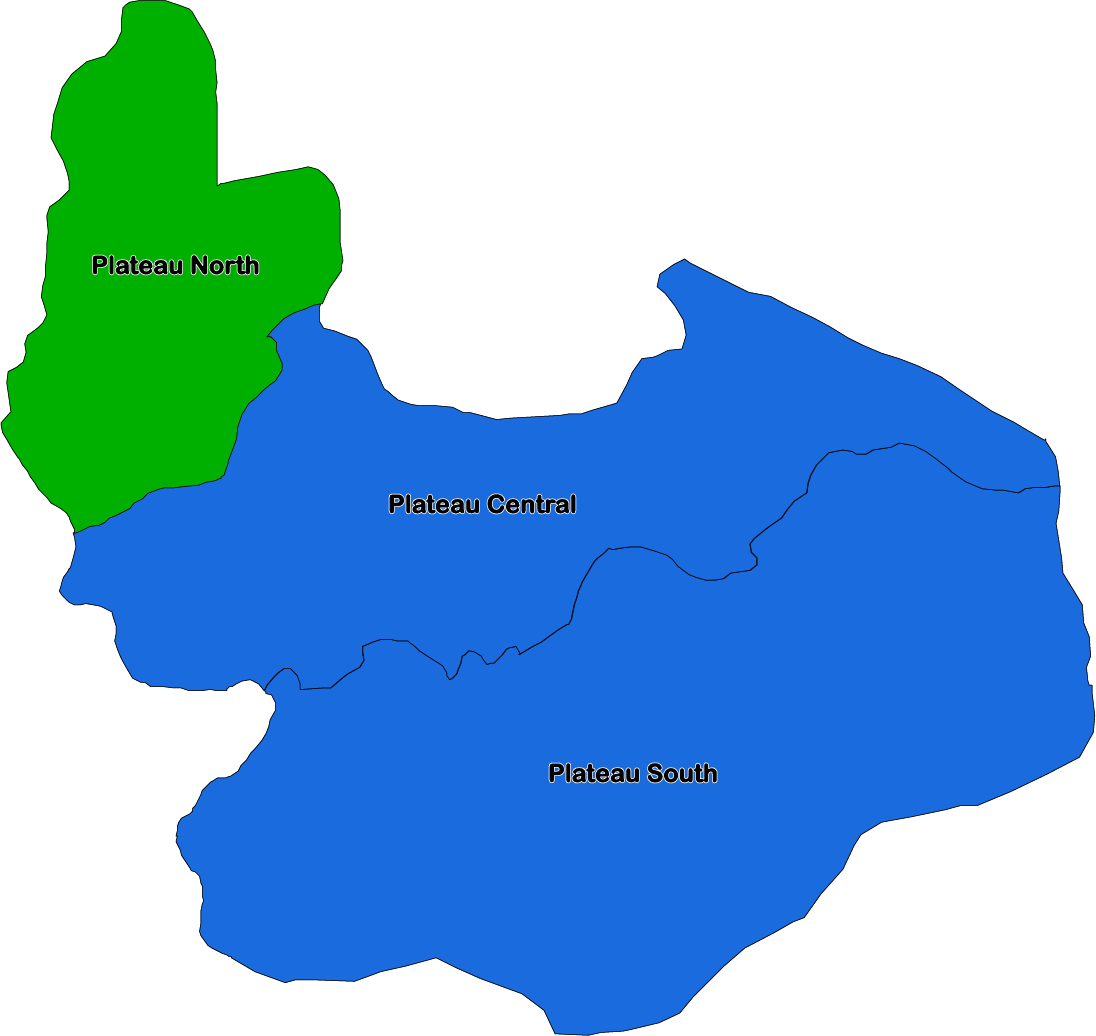
Map of Plateau State

Senatorial District	Constituency
Plateau North	Barkin Ladi/Riyom
Plateau Central	Bokkos/Mangu
Plateau North	Jos North/Bassa
Plateau North	Jos South/Jos East
Plateau Central	Kanke/Pankshin/Kanam
Plateau South	Langtang North/Langtang South
Plateau South	Mikang/Qua’an/Pan/Shedam
Plateau South	Wase

== Rivers State – 13 seats ==
Rivers state is made up of 13 federal constituencies which covers 23 local government areas.

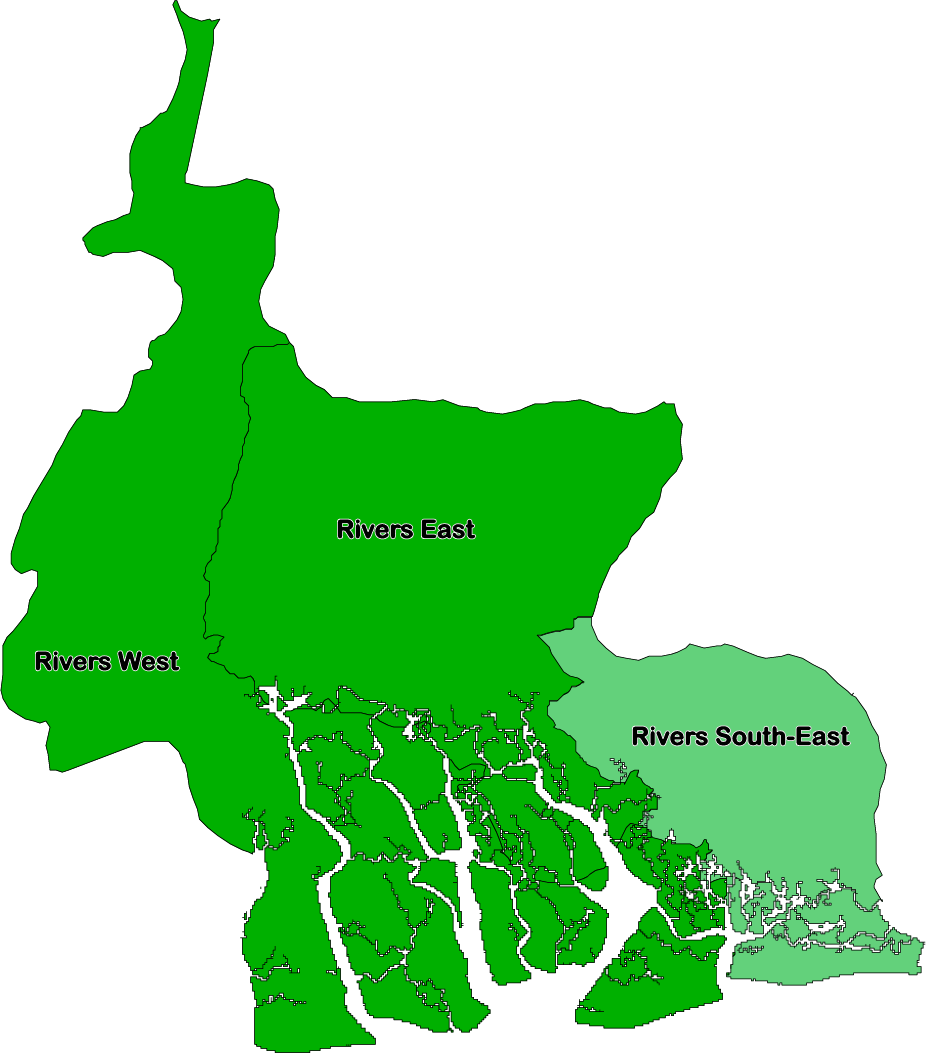
Map of Rivers State

Senatorial District	Constituency
Rivers West	Abua/Odua/Ahoada East
Rivers West	Ahoada West/Ogba/Egbema/Ndoni
Rivers West	Akuku Toru/Asari Toru
Rivers South East	Andoni/Opobo/Nkoro
Rivers West	Degema/Bonny
Rivers South East	Eleme/Oyigbo/Tai
Rivers East	Etche/Omuma
Rivers East	Ikwerre/Emohua
Rivers South East	Khana/Gokana
Rivers East	Obio/Akpor
Rivers East	Okrika/Ogu/Bolo
Rivers East	Port Harcourt I
Rivers East	Port Harcourt II

== Sokoto State – 11 seats ==
Sokoto state is made up of 11 federal constituencies which covers 23 local government areas.

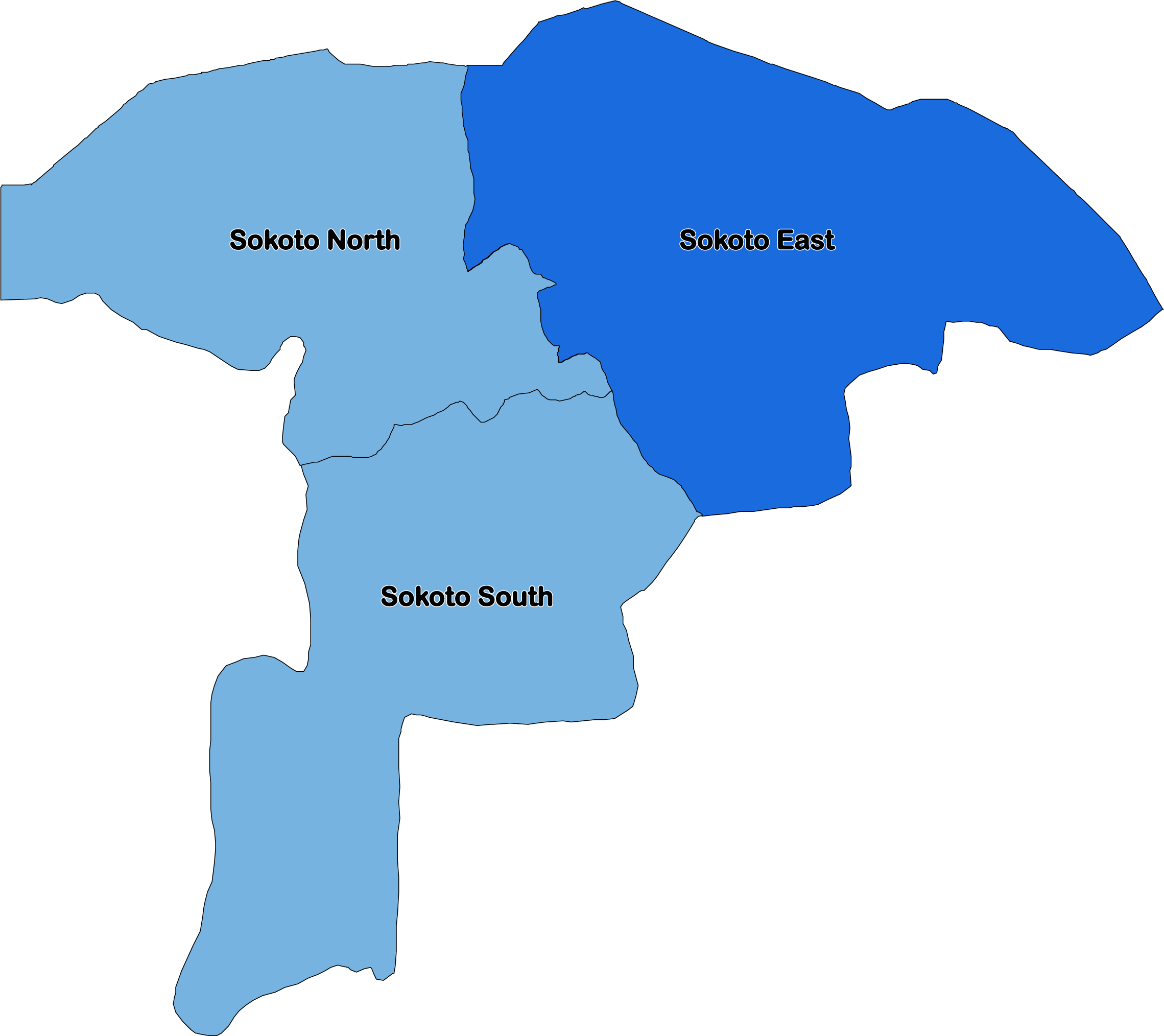
Sokoto State Map

Senatorial District	Constituency
Sokoto North	Binji/Silame
Sokoto South	Dange-Shuni/Bodinga/Tureta
Sokoto East	Goronyo/Gada
Sokoto East	Illela/Gwadabawa
Sokoto East	Isa/Sabon Birni
Sokoto South	Kebbe/Tambuwal
Sokoto North	Kware/Wamakko
Sokoto North	Sokoto North/Sokoto South
Sokoto North	Tangaza/Gudu
Sokoto East	Wurno/Rabah
Sokoto South	Yabo/Shagari

== Taraba State – 6 seats ==
Taraba state is made up of 6 federal constituencies which covers 17 local government areas.

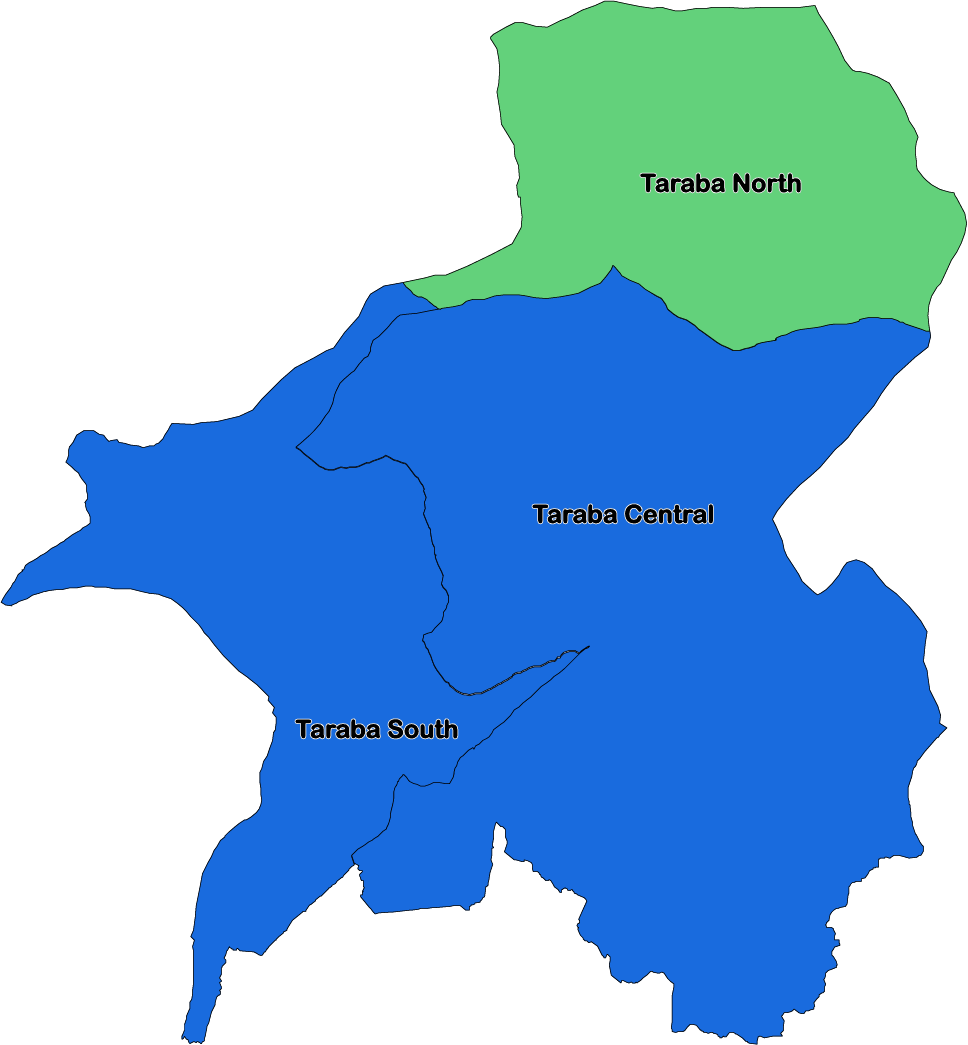
Map of Taraba State

Senatorial District	Constituency
Taraba Central	Bali/Gassol
Taraba North	Jalingo/Yorro/Zing
Taraba North	Karim Lamido/Lau/Ardo-Kola
Taraba Central	Sardauna/Gashaka/Kurmi
Taraba South	Takuma/Donga/Ussa
Taraba South	Wukari/Ibi

== Yobe State – 6 seats ==
Yobe state is made up of 6 federal constituencies which covers 17 local government areas.

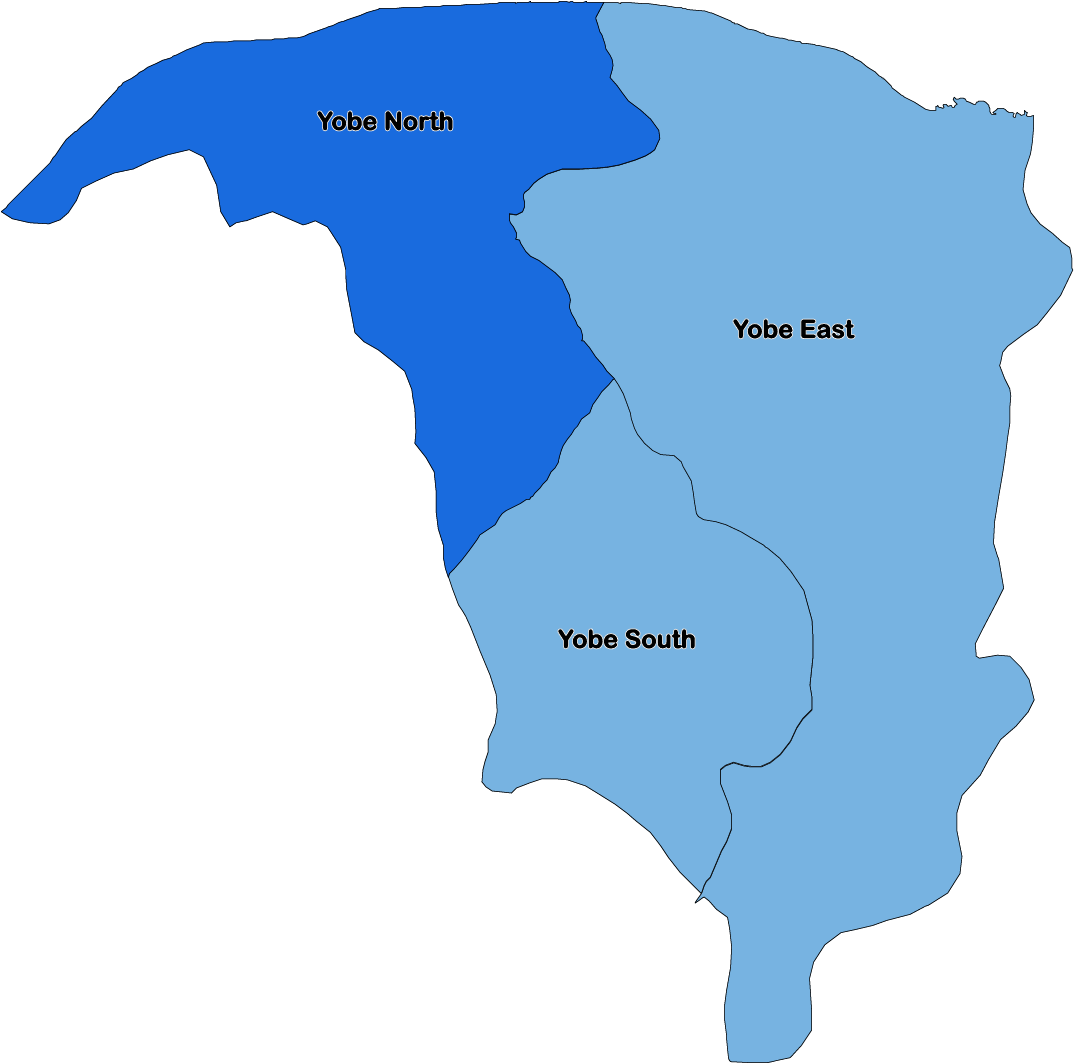
Map of Yobe State

Senatorial District	Constituency
Yobe North	Bade/Jakusko
Yobe East	Bursari/Geidam/Yunusari
Yobe East	Damaturu/Gujba/Gulani/Tarmuwa
Yobe South	Fika/Fune
Yobe North	Machina/Nguru/Yusufari/Karasuwa
Yobe South	Nangere/Potiskum

== Zamfara State – 7 seats ==
Zamfara state is made up of 7 federal constituencies which covers 14 local government areas.

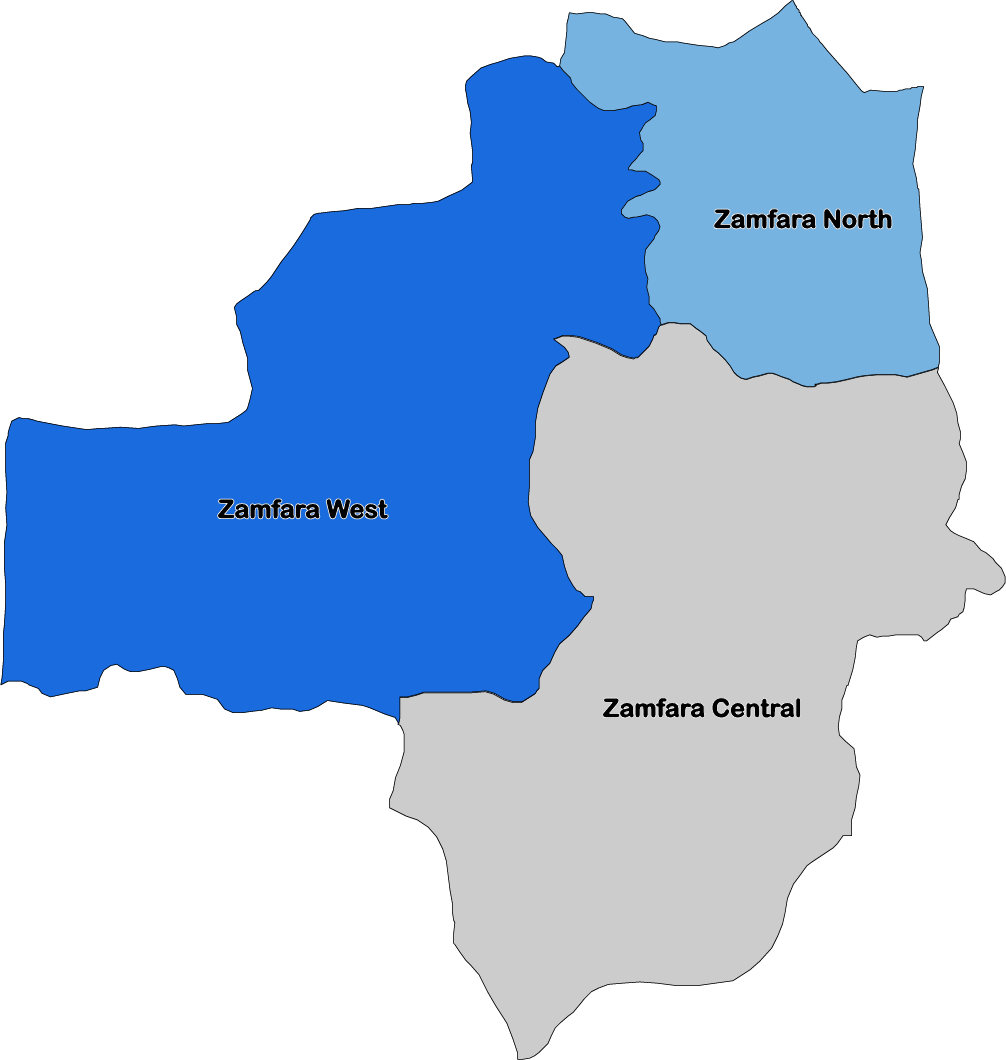
Map of Zamfara State

Senatorial District	Constituency
Zamfara West	Anka/Talata/Mafara
Zamfara West	Bakura/Maradun
Zamfara Central	Bungudu/Maru
Zamfara West	Gunmi/Bukkuyum
Zamfara Central	Gusau/Tsafe
Zamfara North	Kaura Namoda/Birnin Magaji
Zamfara North	Shinkafi/Zurmi

== FCT – 2 seats ==
The Federal Capital Territory is made up of 2 federal constituencies which covers 6 local government areas.

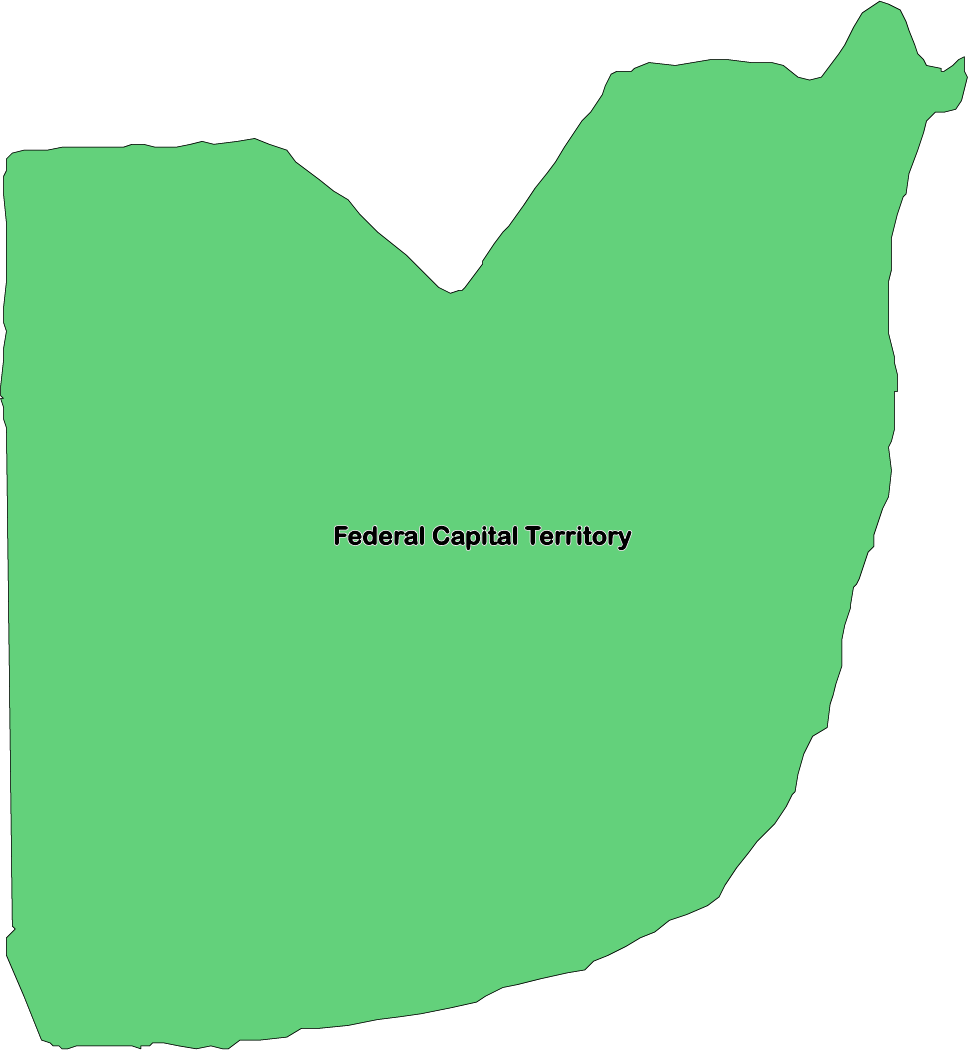
Map of FCT

Senatorial District	Constituency
FCT	Abaji/Kuje/Kwali Gwagwalada
FCT	Abuja Municipal/Bwar

== See also ==
- National Assembly
- Senate of Nigeria
- House of Representatives

== External links and sources ==
- Nigeria House of Reps official website
- National Assembly official website
