= Elections in Rivers State =

Elections in Rivers State are supervised and conducted by two major electoral bodies, Rivers State Independent Electoral Commission (RSIEC) and the Independent National Electoral Commission (INEC). There are 23 local government areas, 319 electoral wards and 4442 polling units in the state. Elections for Governor and the House of Assembly are held every four years, along with federal elections for President and the National Assembly.

Rivers State organizes elections into its local governments through the State Independent Electoral Commission. Each local government area is governed by a local government council under an elected Chairman or Mayor.

== Voting eligibility ==
All citizens 18 years old or above who are residents of Rivers State and live in the ward or local government area where they intend to vote, and have not been rendered unqualified by law may vote. In order to actually vote, citizens are required to register before election day.

In January 2015, the Independent National Electoral Commission recorded a total of 2,537,590 registered voters in Rivers State, Nigeria.

== Electoral system ==
=== Governor ===
The Governor and Deputy Governor are elected through popular vote on the same ticket for a term of four years. They may be re-elected for a second term but may not serve for more than two consecutive terms.

=== Legislature ===
The House of Assembly consists of 32 members, each elected to four-year terms in single-member constituencies by plurality. The qualified members in turn elect a Speaker, whose primary responsibility is to preside over the House. In carrying out his or her official duties, the Assembly Speaker is assisted by an elected Deputy Speaker, who basically serves as the vice-presiding officer of the House.

==== Constituencies ====
- Abua–Odual
- Ahoada East I
- Ahoada East II
- Ahoada West
- Akuku-Toru I
- Akuku-Toru II
- Andoni
- Asari-Toru I
- Asari-Toru II
- Bonny
- Degema
- Eleme
- Emohua
- Etche I
- Etche II
- Gokana
- Ikwerre
- Khana I
- Khana II
- Obio-Akpor I
- Obio-Akpor II
- Ogba–Egbema–Ndoni I
- Ogba–Egbema–Ndoni II
- Ogu–Bolo
- Okrika
- Omuma
- Opobo–Nkoro
- Oyigbo
- Port Harcourt I
- Port Harcourt II
- Port Harcourt III
- Tai

== Federal elections ==
Elections occur quadrennially in which riverian voters will directly elect 16 representatives to the Nigerian National Assembly. Those chosen are grouped into 3 senators representing Rivers South East, Rivers West, Rivers East and 13 representatives representing Andoni/Opobo/Nkoro, Obio/Akpor, Oyigbo/Tai/Eleme, Port Harcourt II, Etche/Omuma, Asari-Toru/Akuku-Toru, Okrika/Ogu/Bolo, Khana/Gokana, Port Harcourt I, Ahoada West/Egbema/Ndoni, Abua/Odual/Ahoada East, Ikwerre/Emohua, Degema/Bonny.

Rivers State has voted PDP in the vast majority of elections since 1999. However, the state has been viewed as important in determining the presidential outcome. In 2011, Goodluck Jonathan won comfortably with 1.8 million votes, the highest total gained subnationally that year. His victory was expected considering ruling party's influence on political life at the time. In 2015, Jonathan was again preferred, though, achieved less than his previous record.

== See also ==
- 2015 Rivers State gubernatorial election
- National Assembly election, 2015
- Rivers State House of Assembly
- Rivers State People's Democratic Party
- Politics of Rivers State
