= 2015 Nigerian parliamentary election in Rivers State =

An election for the National Assembly was held in Rivers State, Nigeria on Saturday, 28 March 2015.

== Results ==
The results of the elections were announced by the Vice Chancellor of Federal University of Petroleum Prof. John Etu-Efeotor. Released on 30 March 2015, the People's Democratic Party emerged victorious over the All Progressives Congress, winning all 16 seats.

=== President ===
Summary of the 28 March 2015 Nigerian presidential election results for Rivers State
Parties	Votes	Percentage
People's Democratic Party (PDP)	1,487,075	95.00
All Progressives Congress (APC)	60,238	3.85
KOWA Party	2,274	0.15
Alliance for Democracy (AD)	1,104	0.07
Action Alliance (AA)	1,066	0.07
African Democratic Congress (ADC)	1,031	0.07
Citizens Popular Party (CPP)	577	0.04
National Conscience Party (NCP)	565	0.04
Hope Democratic Party (HDP)	542	0.03
Allied Congress Party of Nigeria (ACPN)	525	0.03
All Progressives Grand Alliance (APGA)	515	0.03
African Peoples Alliance (APA)	513	0.03
Peoples Party of Nigeria (PPN)	492	0.03
United Democratic Party (UDP)	303	0.02
United Progressive Party (UPP)	156	0.01
Total valid votes	1,565,461	100.0
Invalid/blank votes	19,307	1.22
Votes cast	1,584,768	100
Registered voters	2,324,300	68.20
Source: INEC Archived 2017-03-29 at the Wayback Machine

=== Senate ===
==== Rivers South-East Senate district ====
Rivers South-East Senate district election, 2015
Party	Candidate	Votes	%
PDP	Olaka Nwogu	408,353	94.66
APC	Magnus Abe	23,052	5.34
Total votes		431,405	100.00
PDP hold			

==== Rivers West Senate district ====
Rivers West Senate district election, 2015
Party	Candidate	Votes	%
PDP	Osinakachukwu Ideozu	279,745	91.90
APC	Otelemaba Amachree	24,687	8.11
Total votes		304,432	100.00
PDP hold			

==== Rivers East Senate district ====
Rivers East Senate district election, 2015
Party	Candidate	Votes	%
PDP	George Sekibo	662,278	92.71
APC	Andrew Uchendu	52,064	7.29
Total votes		714,342	100.00
PDP hold			

=== House of Representatives ===
As of 30 March 2015, elected members were: Keys: PDP APC

No.	Constituency	Elected M.H.R	Party	Runner-up	Party	Notes
1	Abua—Odual—Ahoada East	Betty Apiafi	People's Democratic Party	Robinsoh Ewoh	All Progressives Congress	
2	Egbema−Ndoni Ahoada-West	Uche Obi	People's Democratic Party	Lucky Odili	All Progressives Congress	
3	Tai−Eleme−Oyigbo	Jacobson Nbina	People's Democratic Party	Bari Mpigi	All Progressives Congress	
4	Obio-Akpor	Kingsley Chinda	People's Democratic Party	Tony Okocha	All Progressives Congress	
5	Andoni Opobo−Nkoro	Awaji Abiante	People's Democratic Party	Sampson Egop	All Progressives Congress	

== See also ==
- 2015 Nigerian general election
- 2015 Nigerian Senate elections in Rivers State
