= 2015 Nigerian Senate elections in Rivers State =

2015 Nigerian Senate election in Rivers State

The 2015 Nigerian Senate election in Rivers State was held on 28 March 2015, to elect members of the Nigerian Senate to represent Rivers State. Andrew Uchendu representing Rivers East, Magnus Ngei Abe representing Rivers South East and Otelemaba Amachree representing Rivers West all won on the platform of All Progressives Congress.

== Overview ==
Affiliation	Party		Total
Affiliation	APC	PDP	Total
Before Election			3
After Election	3	–	3

== Summary ==
District	Incumbent	Party	Elected Senator	Party
Rivers East			Andrew Uchendu	APC
Rivers South East			Magnus Ngei Abe	APC
Rivers West			Otelemaba Amachree	APC

== Results ==
=== Rivers East ===
All Progressives Congress candidate Andrew Uchendu won the election, defeating People's Democratic Party candidate George Thompson Sekibo and other party candidates.

2015 Nigerian Senate election in Rivers State
Party	Candidate	Votes	%
APC	Andrew Uchendu		
PDP	George Thompson Sekibo		
Total votes			
APC hold			

=== Rivers South East ===
All Progressives Congress candidate Magnus Ngei Abe won the election, defeating People's Democratic Party candidate Olaka Nwogu and other party candidates.

2015 Nigerian Senate election in Rivers State
Party	Candidate	Votes	%
APC	Magnus Ngei Abe		
PDP	Olaka Nwogu		
Total votes			
APC hold			

=== Rivers West ===
All Progressives Congress candidate Otelemaba Amachree won the election, defeating People's Democratic Party candidate Osinakachukwu Ideozu and other party candidates.

2015 Nigerian Senate election in Rivers State
Party	Candidate	Votes	%
APC	Otelemaba Amachree		
PDP	Osinakachukwu Ideozu		
Total votes			
APC hold			
