= Osinakachukwu Ideozu =

Nigerian politician (born 1965)

Member of the Senate of Nigeria
- Incumbent
- Assumed office 2015
- Preceded by: Wilson Asinobi Ake
- Succeeded by: Betty Apiafi
- Constituency: Rivers West

Minority Whip of the Rivers State House of Assembly
- In office 1999–2003
- Preceded by: none
- Succeeded by: Douglas Ikerechi
- Constituency: Ahoada East I

Member of the House of Representatives of Nigeria
- In office 2003–2007
- Preceded by: Chibudom Nwuche
- Succeeded by: Betty Apiafi
- Constituency: Abua-Odual/Ahoada East

Personal details
- Born: July 1965 (age 60–61) Ahoada, Rivers State, Nigeria
- Party: PDP
- Education: Rivers State University of Science and Technology; University of Port Harcourt
- Occupation: Businessman and politician
- Profession: Estate surveyor and valuer

Osinakachukwu Ideozu (born July 1965) is a Nigerian businessman and People's Democratic Party politician. He is currently a member of the Senate of Nigeria representing the Rivers West senatorial district. Ideozu was a member and Minority Whip of the Rivers State House of Assembly from 1999 to 2003 where he represented Ahoada East I and was subsequently elected into the Nigerian House of Representatives between 2003 and 2007 where he represented Abua-Odual/Ahoada East Federal Constituency. Ideozu was appointed the Honourable Commissioner of Finance in October 2007 by the then Governor of Rivers State, Chibuike Amaechi, a position he held till June 2009 when the cabinet was dissolved.

== Education ==
Ideozu attended the Rivers State University of Science and Technology where he studied Estate Management. It is on record that Senator Ideozu graduated in 1989 with a First Class. Ideozu also holds a Master of Business Administration (MBA) Degree in Finance and Banking from the University of Port Harcourt, Rivers State. In furtherance of his educational pursuit, Ideozu has another master's degree in Environmental Management from the Enugu State University of Science and Technology as well as a third master's degree in Public Policy from the prestigious University College of London. Ideozu has won several academic laurels including the Dean's Prize for Best Graduating Student in the Faculty of Environmental Sciences. Senator Ideozu holds a PhD from the University of Vitez and an LLB from the University of Law. Senator Ideozu later proceeded to the Nigerian Law School and was called to the Nigerian Bar and duly enrolled as a Barrister and Solicitor of the Supreme Court of Nigeria. He is a co-founder of the law firm of Ideozu Law Office which has its office in Abuja, the Federal Capital Territory of Nigeria.

== Professional career ==
Senator Ideozu is a Chartered Estate Surveyor and Valuer who was certified by the Estate Surveyors and Valuers Registration Board of Nigeria (ESVABON) and he is a member of the Nigerian Institution of Estate Surveyors and Valuers (NIESV). Ideozu was the Overall Best Candidate in the 2004 Direct Finals Examination conducted by the Nigerian Institution of Estate Surveyors and Valuers (NIESV). He was also the best candidate and winner of the subject prizes for both Property Development and Rating and Taxation. Senator Ideozu is a Fellow of the Nigerian Institute of Management (Chartered) and a Member of Social Policy Association (United Kingdom) and The Association for Public Policy Analysis and Management (USA) among others.

== Senatorial career ==
Ideozu won the Peoples Democratic Party Senatorial Primary in 2014 and became the Party's standard bearer for the Rivers West senatorial district in the 2015 Nigerian National Assembly election. In the general elections, he was declared winner and elected with 279,745 votes to defeat the candidates of other political parties including the candidate of the All Progressives Congress (APC) and his former colleague and closest rival, Rt. Hon. Otelemaba Dan Amachree, the then Speaker of the Rivers State House of Assembly. Senator Ideozu formally became the Senator representing the Rivers West Senatorial District from the 9 June 2015 following the successful inauguration of the 8th Senate of Nigeria.

== See also ==
- List of people from Rivers State
- List of University of Port Harcourt people
