= Etinan/Nsit Ibom/Nsit Ubium federal constituency =

Federal constituency in Akwa Ibom State, Nigeria

Etinan/Nsit Ibom/Nsit Ubium
- constituency for the House of Representatives
- District: Akwa Ibom North East
- State: Akwa Ibom, Nigeria

Current constituency
- Party: Peoples Democratic Party
- Member: Paul Ekpo

Etinan/Nsit Ibom/Nsit Ubium is a federal constituency in Akwa Ibom State, Nigeria. It covers Etinan, Nsit-Ibom and Nsit-Ubium local government areas in the state. Etinan/Nsit Ibom/Nsit Ubium is represented by Paul Ekpo of the Peoples Democratic Party of Nigeria.
