= Rivers West senatorial district =

Rivers West senatorial district is one of the three senatorial districts in Rivers State, Nigeria. It is currently represented by Dr. Mrs. Ipalibo Harry Banigo.

== District profile ==
The district covers the local government areas of Abua–Odual, Ahoada East, Ahoada West, Akuku-Toru, Asari-Toru, Bonny, Degema and Ogba–Egbema–Ndoni. In 2014, it had a projected population of 2,366,158.

LGA	Projected population (2014)	Wards
Abua–Odual	369,771	13
Ahoada East	210,882	13
Ahoada West	325,915	12
Akuku-Toru	203,848	17
Asari-Toru	287,597	13
Bonny	281,401	12
Degema	315,638	17
Ogba–Egbema–Ndoni	371,106	17

== Election results ==
=== 2015 ===
Rivers West Senate district election, 2015
Party	Candidate	Votes	%
PDP	Osinakachukwu Ideozu	279,745	91.90
APC	Otelemaba Amachree	24,687	8.11
Total votes		304,432	100.00
PDP hold			

=== 2023 ===
Rivers West Senate district election, 2023
Party	Candidate	Votes	%
PDP	Banigo Harry	67,668	70
APC	Asita Asita	32,572	30
Total votes		100,240	100.00
PDP hold			

== List of senators ==
- Ibiapuye Martyns-Yellowe (1999 – 2007)
- Wilson Ake (2007 – 2015)
- Osinakachukwu Ideozu (2015 – 2017)
- Andrew Uchendu (2017-2019)
- Betty Okagua - Apiafi (2019 -2023)
- Ipalibo Banigo (2023-
