= Rivers East senatorial district =

Rivers East senatorial district is one of the three senatorial districts in Rivers State, Nigeria. It is currently represented by Allwell Heacho Onyesoh (from the People's Democratic Party).

== District profile ==
The Rivers East senatorial district covers the local government areas of Emuoha, Etche, Ikwerre, Obio-Akpor, Oga-Bolo, Okrika, Omuma, Port Harcourt. It has a projected population of 2,670,903.

LGA	Projected population (2014)	Wards
Emohua	263,817	14
Etche	325,953	19
Ikwerre	247,908	13
Obio-Akpor	607,324	17
Ogu–Bolo	97,586	12
Okrika	290,114	12
Omuma	131,145	10
Port Harcourt	707,056	20

== Election results ==
=== 2015 ===
Rivers East Senate district election, 2015
Party	Candidate	Votes	%
PDP	George Sekibo	662,278	92.71
APC	Andrew Uchendu	52,064	7.29
Total votes		714,342	100.00
PDP hold			

=== 2023 ===
Rivers East Senate district election, 2023
Party	Candidate	Votes	%
PDP	Onyesoh Allwell	134,283	92
LP	Benjamin Okwuwolu	74,725	8
Total votes		848,625	100.00
PDP hold			

== List of senators ==
- John Azuta-Mbata (1999 – 2007)
- George Sekibo (2007 – 2017)
- Andrew Uchendu (2017 – 2018)
