= Andrew Uchendu =

Nigerian politician

Andrew Igbonule Uchendu is a Nigerian politician. He is currently a member of the Senate of Nigeria representing the Rivers East senatorial district. He had always been a member of the People's Democratic Party until 2014 when he switched allegiance to the All Progressives Congress party. Between 2003 and 2015, he represented the Ikwerre–Emohua constituency in the Federal House of Representatives.

== Early life and education ==
Uchendu was born in Mgbuitanwo, Emohua, to the royal family of Uchendu Osi. He obtained his First School leaving Certificate in 1962, West African School Certificate in 1971 and proceeded to the Hope Waddell Training Institution in Calabar, where he earned his Higher School Certificate (HSC) in 1973. He holds a bachelor's degree in agricultural economics from the University of Ibadan, where he graduated with a B.Sc. (Hons) Second Class (Upper Division).

== Career ==
He worked in many organizations, including the Rivers State Ministry of Commerce and Industry; Nigerian Agricultural and Cooperative Bank Ltd., Kaduna; and the Niger Delta Basin Development Authority. In March 1985, he was appointed the general manager/chief executive officer of Risonpalm Ltd. In 1989, he was elevated to the position of managing director/chief executive officer, and thus became the first managing director of a Rivers State-owned company. During his tenure in Risonpalm, the company made profits in seven consecutive years.

== Awards and achievements ==
Uchendu was a 1992 recipient of the Federal Government National Productivity Merit Award, the highest honour that can be conferred on any worker in the public service in Nigeria. He was in 1994 drafted into politics by the Ogbakor Ikwerre Cultural Organisation. He represented Emohua, Ikwerre and Obio/Akpor LGAs at the 1994/1995 National Constitutional Conference.

One of the best members of the House of Representatives, Hon. Uchendu has moved six crucial motions. These include the motions on Ogbakiri crises, Rehabilitation of the East/West Expressway, Establishment of the Oloibiri Oil Museum, Youth Unemployment and Youth Restiveness in Nigeria, Insecurity in the Niger Delta, and the Invasion of the Rivers State House of Assembly by Hoodlums. He has, in addition, sponsored three fundamental Bills in the House. They are the Standard Tendering Procedure for the Award of Contracts in the Public Service (popularly known as Due Process), the National Youth Development Programme, and the Amendment to the Petroleum Technology Development Fund Act.
In the course of his tenure as a Member of House of Representatives, Uchendu attracted a number of Federal and State Projects, namely;

Water projects at Oduoha-Ogbakiri, Rumuche-Emohua, Ovogo and Rumuodogo II in Odegu.

Primary Schools at Mgbueto in Emohua, Ipo and Omademe in Ikwerre LGA

National Skills Acquisition Centre at Elele.

Youth Development Centre at Emohua.

Solar Street Light at Mgbuitanwo, Emohua.

Community Computer Centre at Ndele and Emohua.

Distribution of Secondary School furniture and books for Emohua and Ubima.

Distribution of Transformers for Mgbuetor, Rumuche, Elele, Isiokpo, Aluu and Elele Army Barracks.

Community Town Hall at Aluu.

Scrap Metal Melting Plant at Emohua.

Rumuche Internal Roads.

Influenced the Construction of Mgbuitanwo General Hospital, Mgbuetor Road.

Rumuakwunde Internal Road

Influenced the Construction of the East/West-Elibrada-Oduoha-East/West Road.

Okporowo-Ogbakiri Internal Road.

Credit Assistance to 100 Widows

Skill acquisition for over 30 Youths

Financial support to 300 indigent Citizens of my Constituency.

From his personal savings, he embarked on the award of bursaries to indigent students in the Tertiary institutions in his Constituency. In the first phase, he had 64 Beneficiaries, two in each ward of the Ikwerre/Emohua Federal Constituency. In the second phase, he extended the Bursary to about 140 Beneficiaries, 5 students per ward in his Federal Constituency. Already, payment for the first year has been completed.

In addition, he has facilitated the employment of over 15 Constituents into the Federal Public Service and Parastatals.

As a result of his services to the Community, he was conferred with the Chieftaincy Title of Ochi Aliri II of Emohua and only recently, he was initiated into (Ohna), the highest Traditional Council in Emohua Kingdom.

It is in consideration of all these that Rt. (Hon.) Andrew Uchendu was conferred with yet another Honour in 2008, the Officer of the Order of the Niger (OON).

He is married with five children.
