= 8th Rivers State House of Assembly =

←	7th	9th	→
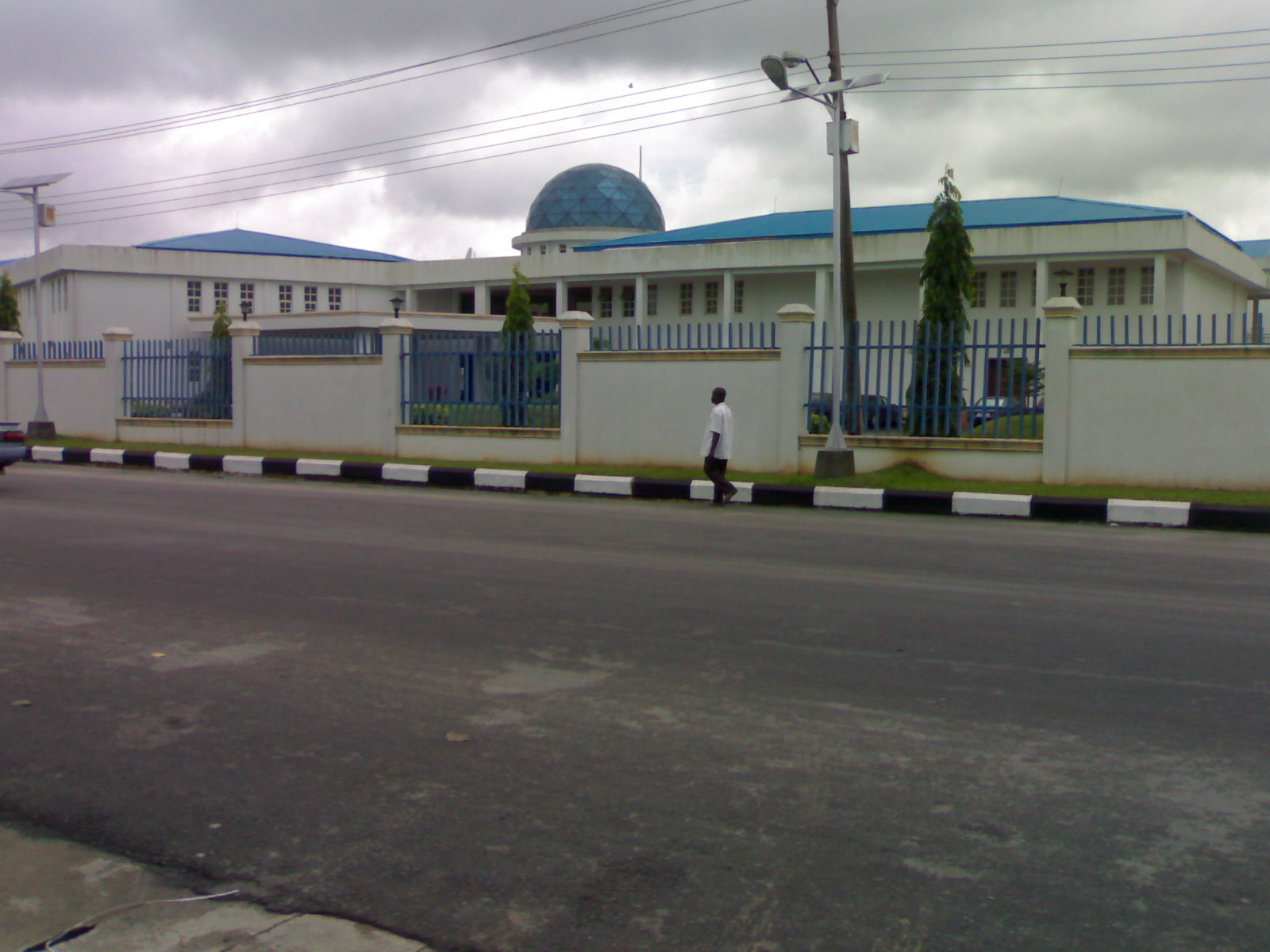

Overview
- Legislative body: Rivers State House of Assembly
- Jurisdiction: Rivers State, Nigeria
- Term: 1 June 2015 – 1 June 2019
- Election: 11 April 2015: House
- Website: www.rsha.gov.ng

8th Assembly
- Members: 32
- Speaker: Ikuinyi Owaji Ibani
- Deputy Speaker: Marshall S. Uwom
- Leader: Martins Amaewhule
- Deputy Leader: Loolo Dinebari
- Whip: Evans B. Bipi
- Deputy Whip: Major Jack

The 8th Rivers State House of Assembly is the session of the Rivers State legislature formed after the 11 April and 18 2015 elections. Representatives of the Assembly were elected from 32 constituencies with members of the People's Democratic Party (PDP) in the majority. The Assembly was inaugurated on 1 June 2015. The elected presiding officer (Speaker) was Ikuinyi O. Ibani, until 19 December, when he resigned and was replaced by Adams Dabotorudima. In December 2016, Ikuinyi O. Ibani was re-elected as the Speaker of the Rivers State House of Assembly.

== Leadership ==
Office	Constituency	Representative	Party
Speaker of the House	Andoni	Ikuinyi Owaji Ibani	PDP
Deputy Speaker	Abua–Odual	Marshall S. Uwom	PDP
Leader	Obio-Akpor I	Martins Amaewhule	PDP
Deputy Leader	Khana II	Loolo Dinebari	PDP
Whip	Ogu–Bolo	Evans B. Bipi	PDP
Deputy Whip	Akuku-Toru I	Major Jack	PDP

== Members ==
Constituency	Name	Political party
Ahoada East I	Martyns Mannah	PDP
Ahoada East II	Ehie O. Edison	PDP
Ahoada West	Okpokiri Okpokiri	PDP
Akuku-Toru II	Benibo Anabraba	APC
Asari-Toru I	Granville Wellington	PDP
Asari-Toru II	Enemi George	PDP
Bonny	Abinye Blessing Pepple	PDP
Degema	Farah Dagogo	PDP
Eleme	Josiah J. Olu	APC
Emohua	Samuel Ogeh	PDP
Etche I	Opurum Iroanya	PDP
Etche II	Tony U. Ejiogu	PDP
Gokana	Ngbulelo Israel	PDP
Ikwerre	Anslem Oguguo	PDP
Khana I	Deeyah Bariene	PDP
Obio-Akpor II	Michael O. Chinda	PDP
Ogba–Egbema–Ndoni I	Christian Ihiakwo	PDP
Ogba–Egbema–Ndoni II	Nathaniel Uwaji	PDP
Okrika	Adams Dabotorudima	PDP
Omuma	Kelechi Nwogu	PDP
Opobo–Nkoro	Diri K. Adonye	PDP
Oyigbo	Chisom P. Dike	PDP
Port Harcourt I	Ogbonda Wene	PDP
Port Harcourt II	Ihunwo Nyeche	PDP
Port Harcourt III	Adoki T. Smart	PDP
Tai	Ngbar Amulele	PDP
