= 7th Rivers State House of Assembly =

←	6th	8th	→

Overview
- Legislative body: Rivers State House of Assembly
- Jurisdiction: Rivers State, Nigeria
- Term: 30 May 2011 – 31 May 2015
- Election: 9 April 2011: House
- Website: www.rsha.gov.ng

7th Assembly
- Members: 32
- Speaker: Otelemaba Amachree
- Deputy Speaker: Leyii Kwanee
- Leader: Chidi Lloyd
- Deputy Leader: Robinson Nname Ewor
- Whip: Ikuinyi Owaji Ibani
- Deputy Whip: Irene Inimgba

The 7th Rivers State House of Assembly was formed after the 2011 parliamentary election. The Assembly sat from 30 May 2011 until 31 May 2015. Representatives of the Assembly were elected from 32 constituencies with members of the Rivers State People's Democratic Party in the majority. The Speaker of the Assembly was Otelemaba Amachree while the Clerk of the House was Emmanuel Amaewhule Ogele.

In July 2014, members loyal to Governor Chibuike Amaechi numbering 25, announced their defection to the All Progressives Congress (APC).

== Members ==
Constituency	Name	Political party
Abua–Odual	Augustine Paul Ngo	PDP
Ahoada East I	Robinson Nname Ewor	PDP
Ahoada East II	Ibiso Nwuche	PDP
Ahoada West	Sam Chigbo Eligwe	PDP
Akuku-Toru I	Brown Onari	PDP
Akuku-Toru II	Benibo Anabraba	PDP
Andoni	Ikuinyi Owaji Ibani	PDP
Asari-Toru I	Otelemaba Amachree	PDP
Asari-Toru II	Godstime Ben Horsfall	PDP
Bonny	Aye Atamah Pepple	PDP
Degema	Tonye Harry	PDP
Eleme	Josiah John Olu	PDP
Emohua	Chidi Lloyd	PDP
Etche I	Victoria O.A. Amadi	PDP
Etche II	Golden Chioma Ngozi	PDP
Gokana	Innocent Barikor	PDP
Ikwerre	Azubuike Chikere Wanjoku	PDP
Khana I	Legborsi Nwidadah	PDP
Khana II	Leyii Kwanee	PDP
Obio-Akpor I	Martins Amaewhule	PDP
Obio-Akpor II	Michael O. Chinda	PDP
Ogba–Egbema–Ndoni I	Gift Wokocha	PDP
Ogba–Egbema–Ndoni II	Lucky Odili	PDP
Ogu–Bolo	Evans Bapakaye Bipi	PDP
Okrika	Belema Okpokiri	PDP
Opobo–Nkoro	Andrew Anderson Miller	PDP
Omuma	Kelechi Godspower Nwogu	PDP
Oyigbo	Okechukwu Akara Nwaogu	PDP
Port Harcourt I	Victoria Wobo Nyeche	PDP
Port Harcourt II	Irene Inimgba	PDP
Port Harcourt III	Victor Ihunwo	PDP
Tai	Felicia Taneh	PDP
