= 4th Rivers State House of Assembly =

←	3rd	5th	→

Overview
- Legislative body: Rivers State House of Assembly
- Jurisdiction: Rivers State, Nigeria
- Term: 29 May 1999 – 29 May 2003
- Election: 9 January 1999: House
- Website: www.rsha.gov.ng

4th Assembly
- Members: 32
- Speaker: Chibuike Amaechi
- Deputy Speaker: Tonye Harry
- Majority Leader: Tamunosisi Gogo Jaja
- Minority Leader: Magnus Abe
- Majority Whip: Hope Ikiriko
- Minority Whip: Osinakachukwu Ideozu

The 4th Rivers State House of Assembly was in session from 29 May 1999 until 29 May 2003. All members of the House were elected on 9 January 1999. The majority party was the Rivers State People's Democratic Party led by Marshal Harry. The presiding officer (Speaker) of the Assembly was Chibuike Amaechi.

== Members ==
Constituency	Name	Political party
Abua–Odual	Augustine Paul Ngo	APP
Ahoada East I	Osinakachukwu Ideozu	APP
Ahoada East II	Kennedy Ebeku	PDP
Ahoada West	Hope Odhuluma Ikiriko	PDP
Akuku-Toru I	Paul Awoyesuku	PDP
Akuku-Toru II	Labo Bobo Manuel	PDP
Andoni	Christian Mba	PDP
Asari-Toru I	Daniel Otelemaba Amachree	PDP
Asari-Toru II	Ben Horsfall	APP
Bonny	George Fubara Tolofari	PDP
Degema	Tonye Harry	PDP
Eleme	Marcus Nle Ejii	PDP
Emohua	Azubuike Odum	APP
Etche I	Okey Amadi	PDP
Etche II	Alloy Nweke	PDP
Gokana	Magnus Abe	APP
Ikwerre	Chibuike Amaechi	PDP
Khana I	Gregory Pie-Noah	APP
Khana II	Monday Ndor	APP
Obio-Akpor I	Glory N. Chukwu	PDP
Obio-Akpor II	Anthony Wali	PDP
Ogba–Egbema–Ndoni I	Monday Eleanya	PDP
Ogba–Egbema–Ndoni II	Elemchukwu Ogbowu	PDP
Ogu–Bolo	Adokiye Oruwari	APP
Okrika	James George Fuayefika	PDP
Omuma	Emeka Nwogu	PDP
Opobo–Nkoro	Tamunosisi Gogo Jaja	PDP
Oyigbo	Prince Precious Oforji	PDP
Port Harcourt I	Chidiebere Okwuwolu	AD
Port Harcourt II	Fubara Exodus Imangs	PDP
Port Harcourt III	Azubuike Nmerukini	PDP
Tai	John Bazia	APP
