= 5th Rivers State House of Assembly =

←	4th	6th	→

Overview
- Legislative body: Rivers State House of Assembly
- Jurisdiction: Rivers State, Nigeria
- Term: 29 May 2003 – 28 May 2007
- Election: 3 May 2003: House
- Website: www.rsha.gov.ng

5th Assembly
- Members: 32
- Speaker: Chibuike Amaechi
- Deputy Speaker: Tonye Harry
- Leader: Tamunosisi Gogo Jaja
- Deputy Leader: James George Fuayefika
- Whip: Hope Ikiriko
- Deputy Whip: Marcus Nle Ejii

The 5th Rivers State House of Assembly was in session from 29 May 2003 until 28 May 2007. All members of the House were elected on 3 May 2003. The majority party was the Rivers State People's Democratic Party led by Uche Secondus. The presiding officer (Speaker) of the Assembly was Chibuike Amaechi.

== Members ==
Constituency	Name	Political party
Abua–Odual	Itotenaan Henry Ogiri	PDP
Ahoada East I	Beatrice Awala	PDP
Ahoada East II	Kennedy Ebeku	PDP
Ahoada West	Hope Odhuluma Ikiriko	PDP
Akuku-Toru I	Anthonia Ineba Membere	PDP
Akuku-Toru II	Kitchener Iboroma	PDP
Andoni	Sam Sam Etetegwung	PDP
Asari-Toru I	Daniel Otelemaba Amachree	PDP
Asari-Toru II	Micheal Ibinabo West	PDP
Bonny	George Fubara Tolofari	PDP
Degema	Tonye Harry	PDP
Eleme	Marcus Nle Ejii	PDP
Emohua	Chidi Julius Lloyd	PDP
Etche I	Okey Amadi	PDP
Etche II	Charles Anyanwu	PDP
Gokana	Gabriel B. Pidomson	PDP
Ikwerre	Chibuike Amaechi	PDP
Khana I	Gregory Pie-Noah	PDP
Khana II	Leyii Kwanee	PDP
Obio-Akpor I	Glory N. Chukwu	PDP
Obio-Akpor II	Anthony Okeah	PDP
Ogba–Egbema–Ndoni I	Augustine Wokocha	PDP
Ogba–Egbema–Ndoni II	Ishmael Nelson Singerr	PDP
Ogu–Bolo	Boma Iyaye	PDP
Okrika	James George Fuayefika	PDP
Omuma	E.A. Nwogu	PDP
Opobo–Nkoro	Tamunosisi Gogo Jaja	PDP
Oyigbo	Prince Precious Oforji	PDP
Port Harcourt I	Chidiebere Okwuwolu	PDP
Port Harcourt II	Fubara Exodus Imangs	PDP
Port Harcourt III	Charles Achor Nsiegbe	PDP
Tai	John Bazia	PDP

== Sources ==
- House of Assembly, Rivers State (Nigeria) (2003). House of Assembly Debates ... Official Report, Volume 5. Rivers State House of Assembly.
