= 6th Rivers State House of Assembly =

←	5th	7th	→

Overview
- Legislative body: Rivers State House of Assembly
- Jurisdiction: Rivers State, Nigeria
- Term: 30 May 2007 – 30 May 2011
- Election: 14 April 2007: House
- Website: www.rsha.gov.ng

6th Assembly
- Members: 32
- Speaker: Tonye Harry
- Deputy Speaker: Dumnamene Dekor
- Leader: Chidi Lloyd
- Deputy Leader: Hope Ikiriko
- Whip: Isaac Kamalu
- Deputy Whip: Irene Inimgba

The 6th Rivers State House of Assembly was formed after the 2007 general elections. The Assembly sat from 30 May 2007 until 30 May 2011. Representatives of the Assembly were elected from 32 constituencies with members of the Rivers State People's Democratic Party in the majority. The Speaker of the Assembly was Tonye Harry while the Clerk of the House was Alex Nwala.

== Members ==
Constituency	Name	Political party
Abua–Odual	Itotenaan Henry Ogiri	PDP
Ahoada East I	Robinson Nname Ewor	PDP
Ahoada East II	Kennedy Ebeku	PDP
Ahoada West	Hope Odhuluma Ikiriko	PDP
Akuku-Toru I	Onari Brown	PDP
Akuku-Toru II	Kitchener Iboroma	PDP
Andoni	Ikuinyi Owaji Ibani	PDP
Asari-Toru I	Otelemaba Amachree	PDP
Asari-Toru II	Michael West	PDP
Bonny	Aye Atamah Pepple	PDP
Degema	Tonye Harry	PDP
Eleme	Isaac Kamalu	PDP
Emohua	Chidi Lloyd	PDP
Etche I	Samuel Eke	PDP
Etche II	Golden Chioma Ngozi	PDP
Gokana	Bariyima Badom	PDP
Ikwerre	Benson Enyidah	PDP
Khana I	Charles Befil Nwile	PDP
Khana II	Dumnamene Dekor	PDP
Obio-Akpor I	Collins Ordu	PDP
Obio-Akpor II	Anthony Okeah	PDP
Ogba–Egbema–Ndoni I	Uchechukwu Nnam Obi	PDP
Ogba–Egbema–Ndoni II	Lucky Odili	PDP
Ogu–Bolo	Maureen Tamuno	PDP
Okrika	Linda Stewart Somiari	PDP
Opobo–Nkoro	Tamunosisi Gogo Jaja	PDP
Omuma	Emmanuel Okatta	PDP
Oyigbo	Nnamdi Ihute	PDP
Port Harcourt I	Jones Ogbonda	PDP
Port Harcourt II	Irene Inimgba	PDP
Port Harcourt III	Victor Ihunwo	PDP
Tai	Felicia Taneh	PDP
