= Martyns Mannah =

Nigerian politician

The Honourable Martyns Mannah MHA

Member of the Rivers State House of Assembly for Ahoada East I
- Incumbent
- Assumed office 1 June 2015
- Preceded by: Ewor Nname

Personal details
- Born: 11 February 1975 (age 51) Port Harcourt, Rivers State
- Party: PDP
- Profession: Politician, businessman

Martyns Ibipulo Mannah MHA, (born 11 February 1975) is a Nigerian state-level politician. He was elected into the Rivers State House of Assembly in 2015, and represents the constituency of Ahoada East I as a member of the Rivers State People's Democratic Party.

== Early life and family ==
Martyns Mannah was born in Port Harcourt, Rivers State on 11 February 1975 to the late Chief Dandison Mannah from Ahoada Main Town and Mrs. Regina Jumbo from Bonny Kingdom all from Rivers State.

== Education and early career ==
Mannah attended State School 1, Ibadan and later transferred to UPE Modern Primary School Ahoada where he finished his primary education in 1989. Following on, he attended Western Ahoada County High School, Government Secondary School, Ubeta and then Michael Comprehensive College, Port Harcourt where he obtained his O' levels.

Mannah has tried his hands on several jobs between 1995 and 2015. He had his first work experience as a rubber tapper in his late Grandfather’s company Irena Plantation at Ahoada in 1995. Later, he worked as a laborer at Okmas Nig. Ltd, Port Harcourt until 1996. That same year, he worked as a recorder in a seismic company called CGG at Ahoada. By 1997, Mannah got employed at NLNG, Bonny as a security consultant and by 1999, he got elected as an NLNG Workers’ Union Welfare Officer where he led the longest workers’ strike action lasting for one month and six days that attracted the attention of Adams Oshiomole, the then NLC President. After his job at the NLNG, Bonny in 2002, he worked at Daewoo, an oil servicing company in Ahoada before doing business as a civil contractor with government agencies in 2003.

In 2011, after losing an election, Mannah ventured into international fashion retail business, after which in the same year, he took up a job with Felix Obuah as a Chief Surveillance Officer. He held this position until his election into the Rivers State House of Assembly in 2015.

== Political career ==
Mannah entered politics in 1991, when he was still in secondary school. He campaigned for the first time in 2004 as Deputy Chairman of Ahoada East under the platform of ANPP, where he lost. In 2011 he campaign again as Deputy Chairman of Ahoada East under the platform of PDP, where he lost again. In 2015, he campaigned to represent Ahoada East I at the Rivers State House of Assembly where he won after a supplementary election.

== Activism ==
Mannah is an activist who advocates for the Niger Delta people. He is the Founder of Orashi Youth Movement and also a former national leader and security secretary of the Orashi Youth Council.

Manna established an NGO, Martyns-Mannah and Friends Foundation, with a goal of poverty alleviation, especially in Ahoada East local government area.
