= Marshall Stanley Uwom =

Nigerian lawyer and politician

The Right Honourable Marshall Stanley Uwom MHA

Deputy Speaker of the Rivers State House of Assembly
- In office 1 June 2015 – 3 June 2019
- Preceded by: Leyii Kwanee
- Succeeded by: The Rt. Honourable Edison Ogerenye Ehie
- Constituency: Abua–Odual

Rivers State Commissioner of Agriculture
- In office 2008–2009
- Governor: Chibuike Amaechi
- Preceded by: Chidi Nweke
- Succeeded by: Emmanuel Chinda

Rivers State Commissioner of Housing
- In office 2006–2007
- Governor: Peter Odili
- Preceded by: Tele Ikuru
- Succeeded by: Chidiebere Okwuolu
- In office 2009–2014
- Governor: Chibuike Amaechi
- Preceded by: Israel Owate
- Succeeded by: Emmanuel Okah

Personal details
- Born: 13 December 1965 (age 60) Yenagoa, Bayelsa State
- Party: PDP
- Spouse: Tracy Marshall-Uwom
- Children: Florence Marshall-Uwom, Joshua Marshall-Uwom
- Education: Rivers State University of Science and Technology
- Profession: Businessman, politician
- Website: marshalluwom.com

Marshall Stanley Uwom, MHA (born 13 December 1965) is a political figure and lawyer from Rivers State, Nigeria. He is a prince of the Agba Royal family of Abua Kingdom in Abua–Odual local government area. He is a member of the Rivers State People's Democratic Party. Uwom held various cabinet-level positions in the past, particularly as Commissioner of the Ministry of Housing and Urban Development and Commissioner of the Ministry of Agriculture. In 2015, he was elected to the Rivers State House of Assembly where he serves as Deputy Speaker.

== Early life and education ==
Marshall Stanley Uwom was born in Yenagoa, present-day capital of Bayelsa State to the family of Stanley J.I. Uwom (JP), a businessman and philanthropist. He earned his West African Senior School Certificate from Okrika Grammar School in 1981, before going to St Lawrence College, Ramsgate Kent in South East England for his Oxford and Cambridge Ordinary and Advanced Level certificates.

After his return to Nigeria in 1984, Uwom attended the Rivers State School of Basic Studies for a brief period of time. There he sat for the Interim Joint Matriculation Board Examinations before being granted direct entry admission to study Law at the Rivers State University of Science and Technology. Uwom also holds a postgraduate diploma in Petroleum and Environmental Law and a Master of Science degree in Corporate governance from Leeds Beckett University, West Yorkshire.

== Career ==
Uwom began his career in the private sector working for family-owned businesses. Between 1980 and 1985, he held the positions of filing clerk, managing director and eventually chairman of the K & K Group and the Twilight Club. In 2003, he withdrew from family business and became actively involved in politics. That same year, he participated in the PDP primaries to represent Abua–Odual federal constituency in the House of Representatives. Following his attempt at the primaries, he was invited to serve as a Special Assistant to the Governor of Rivers State Peter Odili.

=== Commissioner of Housing and Urban Development ===
In 2006, Uwom began service as Commissioner of Housing and Urban Development. He spearheaded the preparation of a draft building code for Rivers State, a draft amendment of the Physical Planning and Development Law No. 6 of 2003, a draft amendment to the Rivers State Housing and Property Development Law No.14 of 1985, and a Housing Policy for the state.

In 2007, he was put in charge of a special state government fund of ₦100,000,000 provided for the people of Abua–Odual local government area by the Odili administration. The assignment entailed superintending a committee of 20 distinguished indigenes of the local government area for the rehabilitation and resettlement of victims and communities ravaged by violent conflict and crisis. During that assignment, he managed to enumerate and screen over 500 scholarship applicants of which 50 applicants were finally chosen for overseas scholarship. In addition, he ensured that each of the 44 communities of Abua–Odual local government area were given the sum of ₦1,000,000 each to carry out community based projects of their choice. Various sums of cash relief were also presented to victims of the crisis.

Uwom was appointed chairman of the security sub-committee of the Rivers State Transition Committee in the outgoing administration of Peter Odili that paved the way for a seamless transition to the Sir Celestine Omehia administration. In March 2009, Governor Chibuike Amaechi reappointed him as Commissioner of Housing and until his resignation in 2014, he was board member of Greater Port Harcourt City Development Authority and Rainbow Town Development Limited.

=== Commissioner of Agriculture ===
Uwom became the Rivers State Commissioner of Agriculture in 2008. He joined the National Action Committee on Cassava, at a time when the world was confronted with the foot-and-mouth disease. He participated at the National Council of Agriculture and the International Fund for Agricultural Development’s country programme evaluation. He was also nominated as a delegate to the IFAD implementation workshop for West and Central Africa at Douala, in the Republic of Cameroon.

=== Member of the House of Assembly ===
Uwom was elected in April 2015 to represent the constituency of Abua–Odual in the Rivers State House of Assembly. On 1 June 2015, he became the Deputy Speaker of the Assembly.

== Committee memberships ==
Uwom served on various committees at the state and national levels including:

- National Technical Committee on the Presidential Initiative on Housing in the Niger Delta
- Rivers State Committee on Recovery of Government Property
- Planning Committee for the South-South Economic Summit
- Inter Governmental Committee on Mass Transit Scheme
- Inter Governmental Committee on Diobu Urban Renewal
- Council Committee on Renovation of the Rivers State Secretariat Complex
- Executive Council Committee on Completion of Government Schools
- Executive Council Committee on Completion of Hospitals
- Inter Governmental Committee on Urban Beautification

== Personal life ==
He is married to Tracy and they have two children.

== See also ==
- 8th Rivers State House of Assembly
- List of people from Rivers State
