= Dum Dekor =

Nigerian politician

Rt. Hon. Dumnamene R. Dekor

Member House of Representatives
- In office 2019 – till date
- Constituency: Khana/Gokana Federal Constituency

Personal details
- Born: 1968 (age 57–58) Port Harcourt, Nigeria
- Party: PDP
- Education: University of Port Harcourt
- Occupation: Nigerian Politician

Dumnamene Robinson Dekor (born 1968) also known as Rt. Hon. Dum Dekor is a Nigerian politician who was Deputy Speaker of the Rivers State House of Assembly from 2007 to 2011. He represented Khana II in the 6th Rivers State House of Assembly. On 15 September 2017, he was sworn in as a commissioner-designee by Governor Ezenwo Nyesom Wike and on 20 September, he was assigned to the Rivers State Ministry of Works. Rt. Hon. Dum Dekor was elected to the House of Representatives as member representing Khana/Gokana Federal Constituency of Rivers State since 2019. He is a member of Rivers State Peoples Democratic Party (PDP).

== Early life and education ==
Dekor attended the University of Port Harcourt and graduated in 1991, obtaining a bachelor's degree in Geography.

== Political career ==
Dumnamene Deekor was one time Deputy speaker of Rivers State House of Assembly, and was later (on 15 September 2017) sworn in as Commissioner of works under Gov. Nyesom Wike regime and later ran for the Rivers State House of Representative of which the result is still pending. He is from beeri community in Khana Local Government Area of Rivers State in Nigeria. He is the second son of the family.
