= Ehie Ogerenye Edison =

Nigerian Politician

Rt. Hon. Ehie Ogerenye Edison

Deputy Speaker Rivers State House of Assembly
- In office 2015–2023
- Constituency: Ahoada East II

Personal details
- Born: Port Harcourt, Nigeria
- Party: PDP
- Education: Rivers State University, Western Ahoada County High School.
- Occupation: Lawyer/Politician

Ehie Ogerenye Edison is a Nigerian politician who has served as the Chief of Staff at the Government House, Port Harcourt, since 2024. He previously served as Speaker and Deputy Speaker of the Rivers State House of Assembly. He was elected to the Rivers State House of Assembly in 2015 and re-elected in the rerun elections of 2016 and 2019, representing the Ahoada East II constituency under the platform of the Rivers State Peoples Democratic Party.

== Early life and education ==
Edison was born in Ahoada, Rivers State, to the family of Chief Clinton Dollars Ehie and Mrs. Salome Ehie, both from the Ekpeye ethnic nationality in Rivers State.

Edison attended UPE Primary School and following on, he attended Western Ahoada County High School, Ahoada Town. He is a graduate of law from the Rivers State University (formerly Rivers State University of Science and Technology) and holds a Post Graduate Diploma in Public Administration as well as a Master's degree in Petroleum Law.

== Career ==
Edison has worked as a community liaison officer in ZB Joint Ventures and Ferzinat Oil and Gas Company Limited. He is also a businessman, farmer and devoted Christian.

== Political career ==
In his early political career, Edison served as national president of the National Union of Rivers State Students (NURSS) and the national president of the Orashi Youth Council. He also served as youth leader of the Peoples Democratic Party in Ahoada East Local Government Area of Rivers State.

Edison was elected as a member of the House of Assembly in 2015 under the Peoples Democratic Party platform to represent the constituency of Ahoada East II. He was re-elected in the rerun elections of 2016, 2019, and 2023. He served as Deputy Speaker from 2015 to 2023.

In October 2023, he became Speaker following an attempted impeachment of Governor Siminilayi Fubara by legislators loyal to Nyesom Wike, Minister of the Federal Capital Territory (FCT). President Bola Tinubu intervened and brokered a peace deal, which subsequently led to Edison’s resignation as Speaker. On 29 January 2024, he was sworn in as Chief of Staff at the Government House by Governor Siminilayi Fubara.

== Personal life ==
Edison married Cynthia Obuzor, a pharmacist, in 2019 and they have two children.
