= Kelechi Nwogu =

Nigerian politician (born 1979)

Honourable Kelechi Nwogu
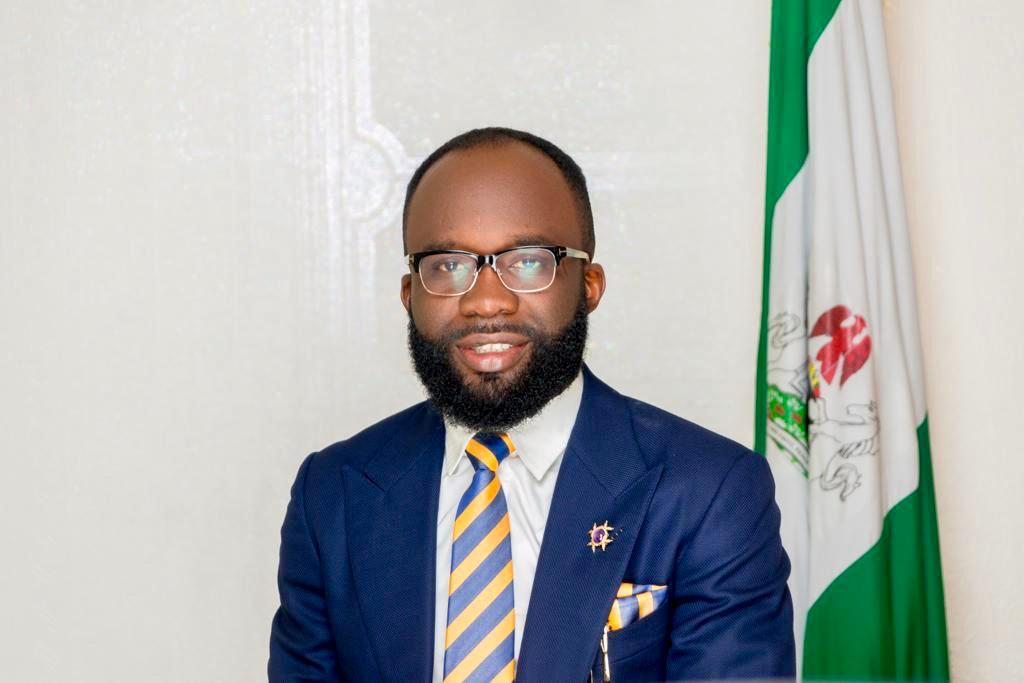
- Hon. Kelechi Nwogu

Assembly Member for Etche/Omuma Federal Constituency
- In office 1 June 2011 – till date
- Preceded by: Emmanuel Okatta

Personal details
- Born: September 10, 1979 Port Harcourt, Nigeria
- Party: People’s Democratic Party (PDP)
- Spouse: Onyeka Kelechi-Nwogu
- Education: University of Port Harcourt
- Website: honkelechinwogu.com

Kelechi Nwogu is a Nigerian politician, a state legislator and member of the 7th, 8th and 9th Rivers State House of Assembly, representing Omuma State Constituency. Nwoguis a member of the People’s Democratic Party.

== Early life ==
Kelechi Godspower Nwogu was born in Port Harcourt, Nigeria. He worked with Negris Nigeria Limited before venturing into private businesses.

== Political career ==
Nwogu was first elected into the Rivers State House of Assembly in 2011 to represent Omuma state constituency. He succeeded Hon. Emmanuel Okatta. He was re-elected in 2015 and 2019. He had aspired for the 2019 Peoples Democratic Party's House of Representatives ticket for the Etche/Omuma Federal Constituency in 2019, but later withdrew for the eventual winner Chief Ephraim Nwuzi. In the assembly, Nwogu at various times chaired the house committees on sports (2011) and local government and chieftaincy affairs (2015 and 2019).

=== Early political life ===
Nwogu started his foray into politics when he was first appointed an aide by Monday Onyezonwu, former Caretaker committee chairman of Omuma local government area of rivers state. He was later appointed personal assistant to then assembly member, Emmanuel Okatta.

== Bills and motions sponsored ==
Kelechi sponsored and co-sponsored many bills and moved motions as a member of the state house of assembly. These include a motion on the disengagement of rivers state indigenes from Abia State civil service, a bill seeking to regulate the Operations of Hotel Business in Rivers State.

== Political controversies ==
Nwogu was one of the five legislators who were against the governor of Rivers State, Rotimi Amaechi. Nwogu announced the impeachment of the Speaker of the house of assembly, Otelemaba Amachree. Nwogu led the people of Omuma to Protest against the police Special Anti-Robbery Squad.

== Personal life ==
Nwogu is married to Onyeka Kelechi-Nwogu and they have four children.

=== Awards and recognitions ===
Nwogu has won several awards, including an award of excellence and philanthropy in football development in Rivers State by the Rivers State Football Coaches Association.
