= Tamunosisi Gogo Jaja =

Nigerian politician

Tamunosisi Gogo Jaja is a Nigerian politician who represented Opobo–Nkoro in the Rivers State House of Assembly during the 4th, 5th and 6th Assembly. He also served as Majority Leader of the House for two tenures lasting a total of eight years. He was the All Progressives Grand Alliance nominee for Deputy Governor of Rivers State in 2011. He later switched political allegiance, joining the Rivers State People's Democratic Party. He is currently serving as Commissioner of Education in the second Wike Executive Council.
