= ILAWDUN =

Independent research institute in Washington, D.C., United States

The Institute of Law Research and Development of United Nations (ILAWDUN) is an independent research institute based in Washington, D.C., United States.

== History ==
The institute was first founded in May 2012 by a group of law scholars. It gained full legal formality in 2022, when its constitution was signed into effect and it was recognized as a legal entity under Title 29 of the Washington, D.C. Code.

== Structure and membership ==
ILAWDUN is structured into a number of bodies that support its research and educational activities. The Office of the President and Director-General oversees the institute, with assistants and directors for areas including research, education, finance, human rights, health, and sustainable development. Beneath the executive office are several councils and academic units. The Academy for Law, Human Rights and Development (ALHRD). Other associated bodies include the College of Fellows, the College of Scholars and Readers, a Council for Honors and Awards, and a Trust Fund to support research initiatives. The institute has also reported an affiliation with the Universal School of Eclectic Analysis, Legal Research & Law Studies (UNISERL), a UK-registered institution, as an independent affiliate.

== Activities ==
The institute holds seminars, workshops and educational activities to spread knowledge of international law, as well as training programs for government officials and students. In April 2025, ILAWDUN's Director-General, Cyprian Edward-Ekpo, publicly challenged the declaration of a state of emergency and the suspension of Rivers State governor Siminalayi Fubara by Nigerian president Bola Ahmed Tinubu, calling the move unconstitutional and dangerous for democracy in Nigeria. Earlier, in January 2024, Edward-Ekpo had also urged reforms to address perceived corruption in Nigeria's judiciary.

In 2025, media reported that ILAWDUN announced the Global Summit & Training Program on Artificial Intelligence, Digital Technology, Advanced Science and Law for Sustainable Development (GLOTADALS), aimed at developing an overarching global legal framework to address opportunities and challenges of AI for sustainable development, with events planned in Washington, D.C. in 2026. In 2025, ILAWDUN also unveiled a 10-layered "Laurel Prizes and Merit Awards" initiative to recognise globally impactful contributions in research and innovation, with an award ceremony planned as a segment of GLOTADALS (2026).
