= Samuel Ogeh =

Nigerian politician

Samuel Ogeh (born 1968), also known as Sam Ogeh is a state-level politician in Nigeria. He is a member of the Rivers State People's Democratic Party. He was elected as Member of the House of Assembly for the constituency of Emohua in the 2016 rerun election. He defeated APC candidate Chidi Lloyd by a majority of 8,208 votes.

Ogeh is currently the chairman of the House Committee on Information and Training. He has pledged to provide legal support to efforts that will enhance efficiency and the growth of state-owned media corporations to credible global standards. He was also the secretary of the Accommodation Committee set up for the burial of Madam Charity Fyneface Oba in 2013.
