= Victor Oko-Jumbo =

Nigerian politician

Rt. Hon. Victor Oko-Jumbo

Member, Rivers State House of Assembly
- Incumbent
- Assumed office 2023

Speaker, Rivers State House of Assembly (Factional)
- In office 8 May 2024 – 18 March 2025
- Preceded by: Edison Ehie
- Succeeded by: Martin Amaewhule (Restored)

Personal details
- Party: Peoples Democratic Party (PDP)
- Education: Rivers State University
- Occupation: Politician, Marine Engineer

Rt. Hon. Victor Oko-Jumbo is a Nigerian politician and legislator who currently serves as the Speaker of the Rivers State House of Assembly. He represents the Bonny Constituency and is a member of the Peoples Democratic Party (PDP).

== Early life and education ==
Victor Oko-Jumbo was born in 1986 in Rivers State. He hails from the Sangama Community in Bonny Kingdom, Bonny Local Government Area of Rivers State.

He began his education at Salvation Army Primary School, Surulere, where he obtained his First School Leaving Certificate (FSLC). He proceeded to Bonny National Grammar School (BNGS) for his secondary education, earning his West African Senior School Certificate (WASSC). He later attended the Rivers State University (formerly RSUST), where he graduated with a degree in Marine Engineering.

== Career ==
Oko-Jumbo held various political and administrative appointments at the local government level. He served as the Special Assistant on Student Affairs to the Caretaker Committee Chairman of Bonny Local Government Area from 2016 to 2018. Subsequently, he served as the Special Assistant to the Executive Chairman of Bonny LGA from 2018 to 2023. Concurrently, he also served as a Special Assistant to the State Commissioner for Local Government Affairs during this period.

=== Legislative career ===
In the 2023 general elections, Victor Oko-Jumbo contested for the Bonny State Constituency seat in the Rivers State House of Assembly under the platform of the Peoples Democratic Party (PDP) and was elected.

=== Emergence as Speaker ===
On May 8, 2024, Victor Oko-Jumbo was elected as the Speaker of the Rivers State House of Assembly by a faction of lawmakers loyal to Governor Siminalayi Fubara. His election followed the resignation of the former factional Speaker, Edison Ehie, and the deepening political crisis in the state involving the defection of 27 other lawmakers led by Martin Amaewhule to the All Progressives Congress (APC).

He declared the seats of 27 pro-Wike lawmakers vacant and attempted to lead legislative business. However, his tenure was marked by intense legal battles. The Court of Appeal and Supreme Court eventually nullified the 2024 budget passed by his faction, ruling that the Amaewhule-led Assembly was the legitimate legislative body.

=== State of Emergency and Displacement ===
On March 18, 2025, citing "total paralysis of governance," President Bola Tinubu declared a State of Emergency in Rivers State, suspending all political officeholders, including Governor Fubara and Speaker Oko-Jumbo. A Sole Administrator, Vice Admiral Ibok-Ete Ibas (retd.), managed the state for six months.

=== Restoration of Amaewhule ===
When the State of Emergency was lifted on September 18, 2025, the Presidency explicitly directed that Martin Amaewhule resume office as Speaker. Consequently, the Assembly reconvened under Amaewhule's leadership at the Legislative Quarters, effectively ending Oko-Jumbo's claim to the Speakership.

As of December 2025, Oko-Jumbo remains a member of the Assembly (representing Bonny), even though the House leadership is currently under the control of the APC-led faction following their formal defection on December 5, 2025.
