= Cabinet of Siminalayi Fubara =

Fubara Cabinet
- Cabinet of Rivers State
- 29 May 2023
- Date formed: May 29, 2023
- Date dissolved: suspended on 18 March 2025

People and organisations
- Governor: Siminalayi Fubara
- Governor's history: State Accountant General (2020–2022)
- Deputy Governor: Ngozi Odu

History
- Election: 2023 governorship election
- Advice and consent: Rivers State House of Assembly
- Predecessor: Nyesom Wike cabinet

Siminalayi Fubara assumed office as the fifth governor of Rivers State on 23 May 2023 until his suspension on 18 March 2025. The governor has the authority to nominate members of his executive council to the Rivers State House of Assembly for confirmation under the section 192 (1) of the Constitution of Nigeria.

The Executive Council of Rivers State, also known as the Governor's Cabinet, is the highest administrative authority in the state. It comprises the Governor, Deputy Governor, the Secretary to the State Government, Chief of Staff, Commissioners, and Special Advisers. They are responsible for advising and assisting the governor. A member of the cabinet can be dismissed or reappointed at the governor's will.

This article documents the nomination and confirmation process for any successful or unsuccessful Cabinet nominees of Fubara's administration. They are listed in order of creation of the Cabinet position (also used as the basis for the state line of succession).

== Cabinet ==
As of 29 May 2023 (Note: The four commissioners were retained after the succession of Governor Fubara from Nyesom Wike.)

- Zaccheus Adangor as Attorney General of Rivers State and Commissioner for Justice
- George Kelly as Commissioner for Works
- Chinedu Mmom as Commissioner for Education
- Isaac Kamalu as Commissioner of Finance

As of 27 June 2023

- Chukwuemeka Woke as Commissioner for Special Projects
- Inime Chinwenwo Aguma as Commissioner for Social Welfare and Rehabilitation
- Kenneth Chisom Gbali as Commissioner for Youth Development
- Itotenaan Henry Ogiri as Commissioner of Power
- Charles Amadi as Commissioner for Chieftaincy and Community Affairs
- Roseline Adawari Uranta as Ministee of Women Affairs
- Jacobson Nbina as Commissioner for Transportation
- Uchechukwu Nwafor as Commissioner for Energy and Natural Resources
- Chris Green as Commissioner of Sports

== Elected officials ==
=== Governor ===
Siminalayi Fubara defeated Nigerian billionaire businessman and APC nominee, Tonye Cole, in the 2023 Rivers State gubernatorial election, receiving 302,614 votes compared to Cole's 95,274 votes in the election. The two other candidates were Nigerian senator and SDP nominee Magnus Ngei Abe and LP's Beatrice Itubo, who received 46,981 and 22,224 votes respectively. The formal certification of the results by INEC took place on 18 March 2023. He assumed office on 29 May 2023.

Governor of Rivers State
| Portrait | Name | Date of birth | Background | Reference |
|---|---|---|---|---|
| | Siminalayi Fubara | January 28, 1975 | Accountant General of Rivers State (2020–2022) | |

=== Deputy governor ===
All of the members of the executive council are appointed by the Governor of Rivers State and confirmed by the State House of Assembly with the exception of the deputy governor.

== See also ==
- Executive Council of Rivers State
