= Itotenaan Henry Ogiri =

Nigerian Professor and Politician

- Born: Okolomade Odual, Rivers State, Nigeria
- Education: B.A in accounting and financial management University of Sunderland, UK MBA at Rivers State University, Port Harcourt -Leeds Beckett University, United Kingdom for his M.Sc. and PhD.
- Occupations: Politician; Public Servant; Academic; Businessman

Itotenaan Henry Ogiri (born in July, 1965), is a Nigerian Professor of Accounting at Gregory University, Uturu, Abia State (visiting) and Politician. He was appointed under the Cabinet of Siminalayi Fubara in Rivers State and currently serving as a Federal Commissioner representing Rivers State in the National Population Commission (NPC) of Nigeria

He was elected as a member of the 5th Rivers State House of Assembly and 6th Rivers State House of Assembly seat for the Abua/Odual State Constituency's representative, before been appointed by former president Goodluck Jonathan as executive director of Finance and Administration for Niger Delta Development Commission (NDDC).

== Early life and education ==
Itotenaan Henry Ogiri (born in Okolomade Odual, Rivers State, Nigeria) had his primary education at State school okolomade and then moved on to Government Secondary School, Emelego but earned his HND in accounting at plateau school of accounting and management studies, Jos, B.A in accounting and financial management at University of Sunderland, UK and MBA at Rivers State University, Port Harcourt before proceeding to Leeds Beckett University for his M.Sc. and Ph.D.

== Career ==
Ogiri served as Company financial accountant, finance manager, and Financial controller in several companies including Seven-Up Bottling Company PLC, Reigate Nigeria Ltd, and Africa Oilfield Services Ltd. He also trained with Akintola Williams & Co. now Deloitte Tusche Tohmatsu International (Chartered Accountants). Ogiri served briefly as general manager, Nigeria Social Insurance Trust Fund (NSITF) before his appointment as executive director (Finance and Administration), Niger Delta Development Commission (NDDC).

In July 2023, after the inauguration of Siminalayi Fubara as governor he was appointed as Commissioner for Power into the Executive council also known as Cabinet of Siminalayi Fubara in Rivers State.

In November 2023, President Bola Tinubu nominated him amongst twenty (20) qualified Nigerians to serve as Federal Commissioners in the National Population Commission (NPC) and it was approved by the Senate of Nigeria in February 2024. Ogiri is the leader of the Rainbow Coalition in Abua/Odual Local Government Area of Rivers State.

Ogiri is a researcher, reviewer, and author. He has presented research papers at international conferences in the United Kingdom, Europe, and the Middle East.

== Professional membership ==
He is a Fellow of the Institute of Chartered Accountants of Nigeria (ICAN) and Associate member of the Chartered Institute of Taxation of Nigeria (CITN). He was a Visiting Fellow at Leeds Beckett University, UK (2013 to 2017), and a guest lecturer at the Centre for Governance, Leadership and Global Responsibility.
