= Kingsley Chinda =

Nigerian politician

Kingsley Ogundu Chinda

Member of the House of Representatives for Obio/Akpor Federal Constituency of Rivers State

Personal details
- Born: 24 March 1966 (age 60)
- Party: APC
- Relations: Married
- Children: 3
- Religion: Christianity

Kingsley Ogundu Chinda (born 24 March 1966) is a Nigerian politician and member of the Nigerian National Assembly. O.K Chinda is currently representing Obio/Akpor Constituency in the Federal House of Representative. On the 21st of May, 2026, Chinda emerged as the Rivers state governorship flagbearer of the APC after the withrawal of Siminalayi fubara, the Current governor of Rivers state, Tonye Cole, Alabo Dakorinama George-Kelly

== Early life and education ==
Hon. Ogundu Kingsley Chinda was born in the family of the late Chief Thomson Worgu Chinda of Elelenwo Town in Obio / Akpor Local Government Area of Rivers State. He grew up under the tutelage of pseudo - parents, Chief (Barr) Mrs. E.N. Ogan and later Chief (Barr) & Mrs. C.A.W Chinda.

Kingsley Ogundu Chinda comes from the Chidamati family in the Rumuodikirike Compound, the community of Rumuodani, and the town of Elelenwo.

He attended State School 1, Orogbum, Port Harcourt, Stella Maris College, Port Harcourt, Rivers State School of Basic Studies, Rivers State University of Science and Technology, Nkpolu, Port Harcourt and Nigerian Law School, Lagos, and was duly appointed to the Nigerian Bar in 1995.

A notable lawyer and community leader, he is a leading partner in the law firm of Onyeagucha, Chinda and Associates, with offices in Port Harcourt, Owerri, and Abuja. Hon. O.K. Chinda has experience working in various areas of law, including Class Action, Human Rights and the Environment, he also remained in contact with his people at all times.

== Political appointments ==
- Legal Adviser, Grassroots Democratic Movement (GDM)
- Obalga Legal Adviser, People Democratic Party (PDP), Obalga (1999-2004)
- Legal Adviser to the Local Government Council of Obio / Akpor (2005-2007)
- Hon. Environment Commissioner, River State (2008-2010)

== Personal life ==
He is married to Mrs. Beauty A. Chinda and they have three children: Angel, Arabella and Praise.

- Official Website of Hon. Kingsley Ogundu Chinda
