= Otelemaba Amachree =

Nigerian politician

Speaker of the Rivers State House of Assembly
- In office 2011–2015
- Preceded by: Tonye Harry
- Succeeded by: Ikuinyi O. Ibani

Personal details
- Born: 14 November 1963 (age 62) Rivers State, Nigeria
- Party: All Progressives Congress (2014–present); People's Democratic Party (1999–2014)
- Spouse: Otorusinya Gilda
- Children: 4
- Education: University of Port Harcourt; Rivers State University

Daniel Otelemaba Amachree (born 14 November 1963) is a progressive politician in Rivers State, Nigeria. He is a former Speaker of the Rivers State House of Assembly. He was elected as the Speaker of the House on 31 May 2011, during the first meeting of the 7th Assembly. Between 1999 and 2015, Amachree has been elected to four terms as a member of the House of Assembly, representing the Asari-Toru 1 constituency. He has been named the longest serving member in any State House of Assembly in Nigeria.

== Education ==
Amachree's education started at Buguma, where he attended Baptist State School from 1970 to 1975. He subsequently enrolled at Baptist High School, Port Harcourt, where he earned his West African Senior School Certificate in 1980. After a session at the Rivers State School of Basic Studies, he gained admission into the University of Port Harcourt, graduating in 1988 with a bachelor's degree in Physics and Material Science. He continued his studies at the Rivers State University of Science and Technology and by 2010, he had obtained a postgraduate diploma in Business Studies along with Master of Business Administration and Master of Science in International Economics and Finance.

== Personal life ==
Amachree is a Christian of the Baptist faith. He is married to Otorusinya Gilda Amachree, and they have three sons and one daughter.
