= Godspower Ake =

Nigerian politician

Chairman of the Rivers State People's Democratic Party
- In office 2008–2013
- Preceded by: Uche Secondus
- Succeeded by: Felix Obuah

Member of the Rivers State House of Assembly
- In office 1979–1983
- Preceded by: ??
- Succeeded by: ??
- Constituency: Ahoada I

Personal details
- Born: 2 February 1940 Erema Town, Ogba–Egbema–Ndoni
- Died: 8 August 2016 (aged 76) Lagos University Teaching Hospital
- Party: All Progressives Congress (2014–2016); People's Democratic Party (1999–2014); National Party of Nigeria (1979–1983)
- Spouse: Christina Ake

Godspower Umejuru Ake MHA, MFR (2 February 1940 – 8 August 2016) was a politician in Rivers State, Nigeria. He was a member of the Rivers State House of Assembly and a Deputy Speaker. from 1979 to 1983, representing the constituency of Ahoada I for the National Party of Nigeria. He was the Special Adviser on Lands and Housing to Governor Peter Odili, a position he held from 1999 until 2007, and even combined this role with the position of the National Vice Chairman of the People's Democratic Party from 2004 to 2007. He became the third Chairman of the Rivers State People's Democratic Party in 2008 and served until 2013 when the High Court ordered him removed from office.

== Early life and education ==
Ake was born in Erema Town in Ogba–Egbema–Ndoni local government area of Rivers State. He was the first child of Robinson Ijeoma Ake and Margaret Nwanwinyioka Ake.
