= 2003 Nigerian Senate elections in Rivers State =

2003 Nigerian Senate election in Rivers State

The 2003 Nigerian Senate election in Rivers State was held on 12 April 2003, to elect members of the Nigerian Senate to represent Rivers State. Ibiapuye Martyns-Yellowe representing Rivers West, Lee Maeba representing Rivers South-East and John Azuta-Mbata representing Rivers East all won on the platform of the Peoples Democratic Party.

== Overview ==
Affiliation	Party		Total
Affiliation	PDP	AD	Total
Before Election			3
After Election	3	0	3

== Summary ==
District	Incumbent	Party	Elected Senator	Party
Rivers West			Ibiapuye Martyns-Yellowe	PDP
Rivers South-East			Lee Maeba	PDP
Rivers East			John Azuta-Mbata	PDP

== Results ==
=== Rivers West ===
The election was won by Ibiapuye Martyns-Yellowe of the Peoples Democratic Party.

2003 Nigerian Senate election in Rivers State
Party	Candidate	Votes	%
PDP	Ibiapuye Martyns-Yellowe		
Total votes			
PDP hold			

=== Rivers South-East ===
The election was won by Lee Maeba of the Peoples Democratic Party.

2003 Nigerian Senate election in Rivers State
Party	Candidate	Votes	%
PDP	Lee Maeba		
Total votes			
PDP hold			

=== Rivers East ===
The election was won by John Azuta-Mbata of the Peoples Democratic Party.

2003 Nigerian Senate election in Rivers State
Party	Candidate	Votes	%
PDP	John Azuta-Mbata		
Total votes			
PDP hold			
