= 2007 Nigerian Senate elections in Rivers State =

2007 Nigerian Senate election in Rivers State

The 2007 Nigerian Senate election in Rivers State was held on 21 April 2007, to elect members of the Nigerian Senate to represent Rivers State. George Thompson Sekibo representing Rivers East, Wilson Asinobi Ake representing Rivers West and Lee Maeba representing Rivers South East all won on the platform of the Peoples Democratic Party.

== Overview ==
Affiliation	Party		Total
Affiliation	PDP	AC	Total
Before Election			3
After Election	3	0	3

== Summary ==
District	Incumbent	Party	Elected Senator	Party
Rivers East			George Thompson Sekibo	PDP
Rivers West			Wilson Asinobi Ake	PDP
Rivers South East			Lee Maeba	PDP

== Results ==
=== Rivers East ===
The election was won by George Thompson Sekibo of the Peoples Democratic Party.

2007 Nigerian Senate election in Rivers State
Party	Candidate	Votes	%
PDP	George Thompson Sekibo		
Total votes			
PDP hold			

=== Rivers West ===
The election was won by Wilson Asinobi Ake of the Peoples Democratic Party.

2007 Nigerian Senate election in Rivers State
Party	Candidate	Votes	%
PDP	Wilson Asinobi Ake		
Total votes			
PDP hold			

=== Rivers South East ===
The election was won by Lee Maeba of the Peoples Democratic Party.

2007 Nigerian Senate election in Rivers State
Party	Candidate	Votes	%
PDP	Lee Maeba		
Total votes			
PDP hold			
