= Port Harcourt Ring Road Project =

- Type of project: Road Construction
- Owner: Rivers State Government
- Country: Nigeria
- State: Rivers State
- Launched: 17 July 2023
- Budget: N195.3 billion
- Status: In Progress

The Port Harcourt Ring Road Project is one of the projects in Rivers State, Nigeria that is handled by Julius Berger Company. The Port Harcourt Ring Road Project aims at connecting communities so that accessibility to the State capital will become far much easier.

== Coverage ==
The Port Harcourt Ring Road Project, which is about 51.15Km with six (6) sections, six flyovers and one river-crossing bridge, will cover six (6) local government areas in Rivers State. The LGAs are Port Harcourt , Obio-Akpor, Ikwerre, Etche, Eleme, Okrika. The Port Harcourt Ring Road Project according to George Kelly Alabo who gave a description that the project has been on the drawing board for decades. It has a length of 50.15km with 45 km dual carriage way, 4.8km of 6 flyovers and a 350m river-crossing bridge.

== Construction ==
The Port Harcourt Ring Road Project Kick-started on Monday 17 July 2023 when the Former Governor of Rivers State Nyesom Wike, performed the Port Harcourt Ring Road flag-off ceremony estimated to cost the State government for the Port Harcourt Ring Road Project is about N195 billion. News has it that the Julius Berger Company has been paid 75% of the necessary funds to carry out the work. The construction is meant to last for three (3) years.
