= Felix A. Obuah =

Nigerian business magnate, politician and philanthropist

Sole Administrator of the Rivers State Waste Management Agency
- Incumbent
- Assumed office June 2015
- Governor: Ezenwo Wike

Chairman of the Rivers State People's Democratic Party
- Incumbent
- Assumed office 2013
- Preceded by: Godspower U. Ake

Personal details
- Born: Felix Amaechi Obuah; 16 December Omoku, Rivers State
- Party: People's Democratic Party (PDP)
- Parent: Bethel Chukujindu Obuah (father)
- Profession: Businessman, politician, philanthropist

Felix Amaechi Obuah (born 16 December) is a Nigerian business magnate, politician and philanthropist originally from Omoku, Rivers State, Nigeria. He has been the chairman of the Rivers State People's Democratic Party since 2013 and was reelected in May 2016 for his second term. Obuah has a bachelor's degree in Business Administration from the University of Ibadan. With a business career spanning over 25 years, his diverse interests range from properties, real estate, hotels, resorts, oil, trading and construction.

Obuah has served as council chairman of Ogba–Egbema–Ndoni local government area in Rivers State. He has also served as the national chairman of Oil Mineral Producing Areas Landlords Association of Nigeria (OMPALAN). Obuah was a regular fixture of the 2015 elections, as he demonstrated unwavering resilience in his determination to ensure the election of Ezenwo Nyesom Wike. In June 2015, he was appointed Sole Administrator of the Rivers State Waste Management Agency.

== Personal life ==
His father Bethel Chukujindu Obuah, a devout Christian, died aged 85 in 2016.

== See also ==
- Go Round F.C.
