= John Bazia =

Nigerian politician

John Nsaneh Bazia

Commissioner for Chieftaincy and Community Affairs, Rivers State
- In office December 2015 – 2019
- Governor: Nyesom Wike

Member of the Rivers State House of Assembly
- In office 1999–2007
- Constituency: Tai

Personal details
- Born: Botem, Rivers State, Nigeria
- Occupation: Politician

John Nsaneh Bazia is a politician from Botem, Rivers State who represented Tai in the Rivers State House of Assembly from 1999 to 2007 and is also the Commissioner Of Special Duties He is a member of the Rivers State People's Democratic Party.

As of December 2015, he is the Commissioner of Chieftaincy and Community Affairs.

== Political career ==
John Nsaneh Bazia began his political career as a member of the Rivers State House of Assembly, representing Tai Constituency from 1999 to 2007. Following his legislative service, he was appointed Commissioner for Special Duties in Rivers State. He later served as Commissioner for Chieftaincy and Community Affairs under the administration of Governor Nyesom Wike. In 2020, Bazia left the People's Democratic Party (PDP) and joined the All Progressives Congress (APC).

== Community impact ==
Bazia has participated in community development initiatives in Rivers State. As Commissioner for Chieftaincy and Community Affairs, he engaged with traditional institutions and community leaders on community affairs. He has also participated in outreach programmes in the state.

== See also ==
- List of people from Rivers State
- 5th Rivers State House of Assembly
