= Adoki Tonye Smart =

Nigerian politician

Member of the Rivers State House of Assembly
- Constituency: Port-Harcourt II

Personal details
- Born: Rivers State, Nigeria
- Party: All Progressives Congress (APC)
- Occupation: Politician

Adoki Tonye Smart is a Nigerian politician currently serving as the State Representative for the Port-Harcourt II constituency in the Rivers State House of Assembly.
