= Boniface S. Emerengwa =

Nigerian lawyer and politician

Member of the House of Representatives of Nigeria
- Incumbent
- Assumed office 29 May 2015
- Preceded by: Andrew Uchendu

Personal details
- Born: 1 February 1959 (age 67) Rivers State, Nigeria
- Party: PDP
- Profession: Lawyer, politician

Boniface Sunday Emerengwa (born 1959 in Rivers State) is a Nigerian lawyer and People's Democratic Party politician. He represents Ikwerre-Emohua constituency in the House of Representatives of Nigeria, a post he was elected to in March 2015. Emerengwa has served as Rivers State Budget and Economic Planning Commissioner. He is also a former chairman of Ikwerre local government area in the state.

== Early life and education ==
Boniface Sunday Emerengwa was born in Rivers State, Nigeria. He attended the University of Ibadan, where he studied law and obtained a Bachelor of Laws (LL.B.) degree in 1984. He was later called to the Nigerian Bar after completing his legal training at the Nigerian Law School, Victoria Island 1985.

== Career ==
Boniface Sunday Emerengwa is a lawyer and politician. Before his election to the National Assembly, he served as Chairman of Ikwerre Local Government Area and later as Commissioner for Budget and Economic Planning in Rivers State. In 2015, he was elected to represent Ikwerre/Emohua Federal Constituency in the House of Representatives and was re-elected in 2019 and 2023.

== See also ==
- List of people from Rivers State
