= National Population Commission =

Principal population commission of Nigeria responsible for data collection

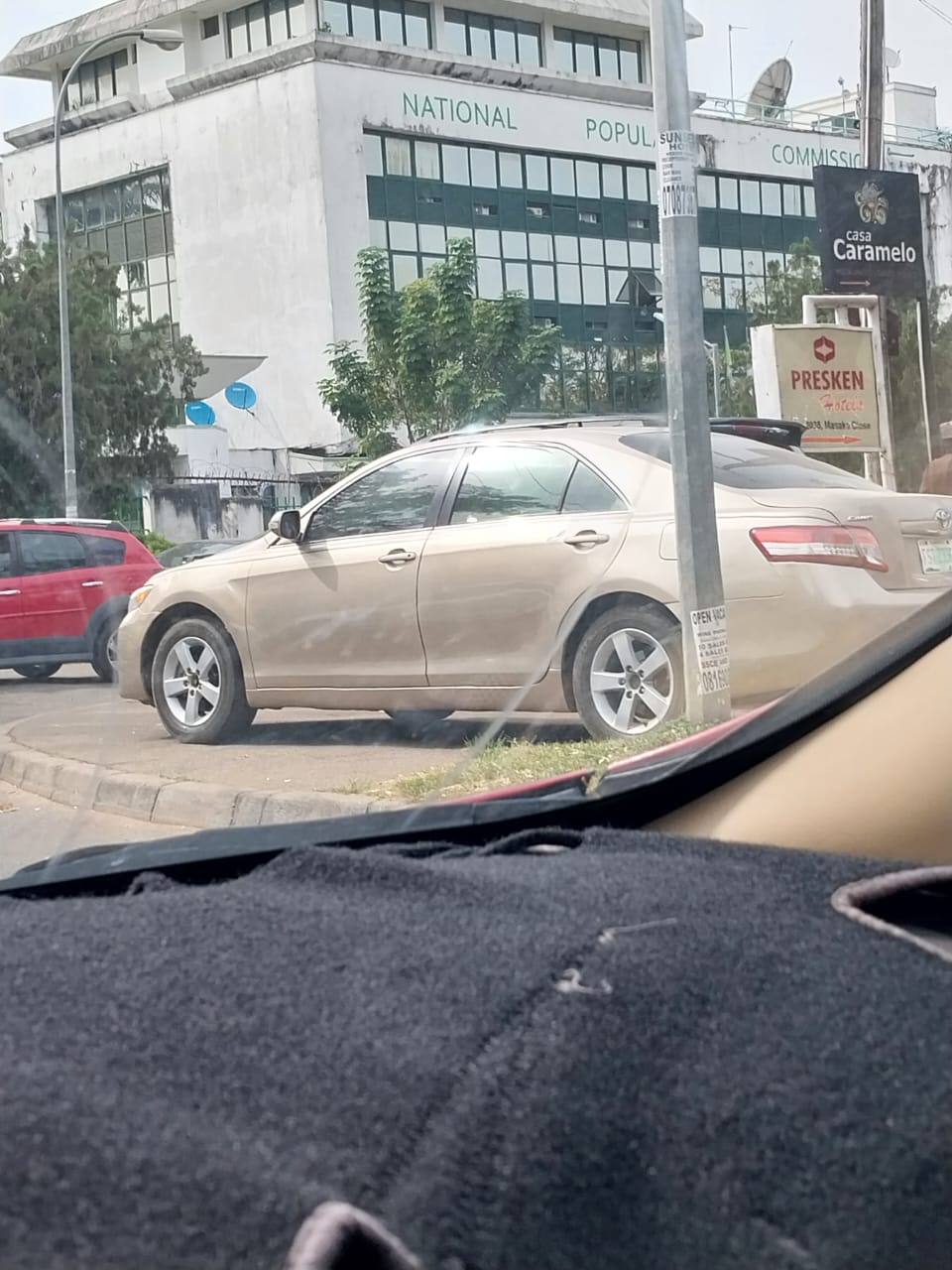

Agency overview
- Formed: 1979; 47 years ago
- Jurisdiction: Federal Republic of Nigeria
- Headquarters: Abuja
- Agency executive: Hon. Nasir Isa Kwarra, Chairman
- Parent department: Office of the Presidency(Nigeria)
- Website: https://nationalpopulation.gov.ng/

National Population Commission (NPC) is the principal data mining commission of the Federal Republic of Nigeria, responsible for collecting, collating, analysing and publishing data about the Nigerian people (its population) and economy. The commission is under the supervision of the Office of the Presidency (Nigeria), and its head is appointed by the President of Nigeria.

The commission is currently headed by Hon. Dr. Aminu Yusuf (Talban Wushishi).

== Organizational Structure ==
The Commission is composed of a policy-making body consisting of 37 Federal Commissioners who are organized into different Standing Committees. The Commission is led by a Chairman, while the administrative head is the Director-General. Departments within the Commission include Cartography, Census, Finance & Accounts, Human Resources and Administration, ICT, Audit, Population Management and Development, Planning and Research, Population Studies, Public Affairs, Procurement, Special Duties, Vital Registration, and Legal Services, General Services.

The State offices are headed by the Honourable Federal Commissioners who are the administrative heads. Departments in the states are: Technical Unit, Vital Registration, Human Resource, and Management and Public Affairs.

At the Local Government Area level, Comptrollers serve as liaisons between the office, traditional institutions, and local government authorities. The Commission's Secretariat and Internal Audit are both under the office of the Chairman.

== Substantive Chairmen of National Population Commission ==
Below is a list of substantive chairmen of the National Population Commission of Nigeria.

S/NO	Name	State	Tenure
1	Ademola Adetokunbo	Ogun	1973 - 1979 (Census Board)
2	Alh. Abdulrahman Okene	Kogi	1980 - 1983
3	Alh. Shehu Musa (CFR)	Niger	1988 - 1992
4	Lt. Col. Chris Ugokwe (Rtd)	Anambra	1992 - 2000
5	Chief Samu'ila Danko Makama	Plateau	2001 - 2012
6	Mr. Eze Festus Odimegwu, CON	Imo	2012 - 2013
7	Mr. Eze Duruiheoma, SAN	Imo	2014 - 2019
8	Hon. Nasir Isa Kwarra	Nasarawa	2020 - date

== List of Federal Commissioners ==
Below is a list of all the present 37 federal commissioners who make up the policy-making body of the National Population Commission.

S/NO	Name	State
1	Hon. Emmanuel Trump Eke	Abia
2	Dr. Clifford T.O Zirra	Adamawa
3	Engr. Bennedict Ukpong, FNSE	Akwa Ibom
4	Mr. Chidi Christopher Ezeoke, mni	Anambra
5	Hon. Ibrahim Mohammed	Bauchi
6	Mrs. Gloria Izonfuo, mni	Bayelsa
7	Barr. Patricia Iyanya Kupchi	Benue
8	Barr. Isah Audu Buratai	Borno
9	Bishop Alex Ukam	Cross River
10	Mrs Blesing Brume-Ataguba	Delta
11	Dr. Jeremiah Ogbonna Nwankwagu	Ebonyi
12	Dr. Tony Aiyejina	Edo
13	Hon. Ayodeji Ajayi	Ekiti
14	Hon. Ejike Eze	Enugu
15	Hon. Joseph K. Shazin	FCT
16	Hon. Abubakar Mohammed Danburam	Gombe
17	Prof. Uba Nnabue	Imo
18	Garba A. G. Zakar	Jigawa
19	Mrs Saadatu Garba Dogonbauchi	Kaduna
20	Dr. Aminu Ibrahim Tsanyawa	Kano
21	Hon. (Engr.) Bala Almu Banye	Katsina
22	Dr. Haliru Bala	Kebbi
23	Hon. Yori Afolabi	Kogi
24	Razaq Folorunsho Gidado	Kwara
25	Barr. Mrs. Saidat Olayinka Oladunjoye	Lagos
26		Nassarawa
27	Mohammed Dattijo Usman	Niger
28	Otunba Fasuwa Abayomi Johnson	Ogun
29	Mrs Victoria Iyantan| Ondo	
30	Dr. Tadese Amidu	Osun
31	Dr. Eyitayo Oyetunji	Oyo
32	Mrs. Mary Ishaya Afan, mni	Plateau
33	Prof. Itotenaan Henry Ogiri	Rivers
34	HE Tpl. Chiso Abdullahi Dattijo, MNITP, RTP	Sokoto
35	Mr. Sale Sule Saany	Taraba
36		Yobe
37	Hon. Mohammad Muttaka Rini	Zamfara

== History ==
The National Population Commission (NPC) is a Nigerian government agency established by Section 140 (1) of the 1979 Constitution of the Federal Republic of Nigeria. However, it was suspended on 31 December 1983, following a military takeover of the democratically elected government of Nigeria. The commission was re-established by the National Population Commission Decree No. 23 of 1989, which is now known as the National Population Act, CAP – No_67, Law of the Federal Government of Nigeria (LFN) 2004. The 1999 Constitution of the Federal Republic of Nigeria (as amended), under section 153 (i) (j) and part of (i) (j) of the third Schedule to the Constitution, and Births, Deaths, etc. (Compulsory Registration) Act, CAP B9, LFN 2004.

The Commission has the statutory powers to collect, analyse and disseminate population and demographic data in the country. It is also mandated to undertake demographic sample surveys, compile, collate and publish migration and civil registration statistics as well as monitor the country's population policy.

Prior to 1979, the Commission was known as the National Census Board, and conducted the 1973 Census. It was headed by Justice Adetokunbo Ademola. It was a temporal body which was later transformed into the National Population Bureau. In 1981, President Shehu Shagari inaugurated Alhaji Abdulrahman Okene, as chairman of the commission, alongside 19 members representing each state of the federation.

When General Muhammadu Buhari overthrew the Shagari presidency on 31 December 1983, the constitution was suspended and the commission was dissolved. The commission reverted to the status of a Bureau, and was headed by a civil servant on the rank of director.

In 1988, Alhaji Shehu Musa, Makaman Nupe was appointed by General Ibrahim Badamosi Babangida, as chairman of the commission alongside six members. The commission was legalized with Decree No 43 of 1989. This commission conducted the 1991 census.

Empowered by the 1999 Constitution, in October 2001, the Olusegun Obasanjo administration inaugurated Chief Samu’ila Danko Makama as chairman of the Commission alongside 37 members representing each state in Nigeria and the FCT.

In June 2012 Chief Eze Festus Odimegwu was inaugurated as chairman of the commission alongside 37 members, one each from the 36 states of Nigeria, and one representing the Federal Capital Territory. Odimegwu resigned in October 2013. In February 2014, Eze Duruiheoma, SAN was appointed Chairman of the commission.

On 15 October 2020, the Senate of Nigeria confirmed the appointment of Nasir Isa Kwarra as the chairman and eleven commissioners for the Commission.

== Population Census in Nigeria ==
With the census Ordinance of 1863, the first population census in the Nigeria area was conducted in 1866. Subsequent ones were held in 1871, 1881, 1891 and 1901. These counts were all confined to the Lagos Colony and its environs, and marked the sequential beginning of the British decennial census tradition in Nigeria.

The 1911 census covered the entire Southern Protectorate. However, the enumeration was not total because some areas had not yet accepted the authority of the colonial government.

The amalgamation of the Southern and Northern protectorates in 1914 by Lord Lugard widened the census coverage in Nigeria. Like in previous censuses, the results of the 1921 population estimates were based on tax records, and people who had not filed a tax return were not counted. In the Northern region, the population estimates were based on vital statistics.

The Women's War of 1929 in Calabar and Owerri provinces in the Eastern region prevented the enumeration of major municipalities in these areas in 1931. Similarly, some areas in the Northern provinces were not counted as some census staff were re-posted to anti-locust duties as a result of the raging locust invasion in some parts of the North.

The outbreak of the Second World War broke the sequential chain of the decennial counts as no population count was conducted in 1941. The 1952/1953 Population Census was marred by gross under-enumeration as people were suspicious of the motives of the exercise having been broken by the Second World War.

The 1962 population census was simultaneously held across the nation. The census was highly politicized. All the regional governments rejected the results. This led to a rerun in 1963 which was still contested at the Supreme Court, where the court declined jurisdiction over administrative functions of government.

The census of 1973 was also not gazetted for reasons of falsification of figures for political and ethnic advantages. The 1991 Census employed the principle of simultaneity. It was scientifically conducted, accepted, and gazetted. The first population and housing census held in 2006. It employed the use of GPS and satellite imagery to mark-out Geo-referenced enumeration areas.

=== Population policies in Nigeria ===
Rising poverty and crime rate necessitated Nigeria's first population policy in the 1980s. Hence, the 1st, 2nd, and 3rd Development Plans included poverty elimination.

The first National Population Policy, enacted in 1988, was aimed at changing Nigerians' reproductive habits. It aimed to protect the health of both mother and child by reducing the proportion of women marrying before the age of 18 by 50% by 1995 and 80% by 2000; extending family planning services to 50% of women of childbearing age by 1995 and 80% by 2000; reducing the number of births per woman to four; and reducing the number of births to four per woman.

In 2004 the government launched a Revised National Population Policy. The policy's specific targets include: "reducing National population growth rate to 2% or lower by the year 2015; reducing total fertility rate of at least 0.6 children every five years; increasing the modern contraceptive prevalence rate by at least 2% per year; reducing infant mortality rate to 35 per 1,000 live births by 2015; reducing child mortality rate to 45 per 1,000 live births by 2015; reducing maternal mortality to 125 per 100,000 live births by 2010 and 75 by 2015; and achieving a 25 percent reduction in HIV adult prevalence."

=== The 2022 population policy ===
The 2022 population policy for Nigeria, named the Revised National Policy on Population for Sustainable Development was launched on 4 February 2022, by President Muhammadu Buhari. The policy is built on top of the background of Nigeria's sustained high fertility rate. To reverse it, the policy plans to increase access to modern family planning methods, birth spacing, and counseling. The outcome of the policy is improvement in women's health, newborns, children, and adolescents.

== 1991 population census figures ==
Below is the National Summary of the 1991 population census, which used the de facto method.

S/No	State	Number of Households	Male	Female	Total
1	Abia	510,971	1,125,999	1,212,488	2,338,487
2	Adamawa	406,683	1,050,791	1,051,262	2,102,053
3	Akwa Ibom	473,445	1,167829	1,241,784	2,409,613
4	Anambra	586,921	1,374,671	1,421,804	2,796,475
5	Bauchi	774,554	2,192,423	2,158,584	4,351,007
6	Benue	498,554	1,368,965	1,384,112	2,753,077
7	Borno	562,659	1,296,111	1,239,892	2,536,003
8	Cross River	392,429	956,136	955,161	1,911,297
9	Delta	573,042	1,271,932	1,318,559	2,590,291
10	Edo	441,798	1,085,156	1,086,849	2,172,005
11	Enugu	638,113	1,475,648	1,678,732	3,154,380
12	FCT	86,524	205,299	166,375	371,674
13	Imo	541,396	1,166,448	1,319,187	2,485,635
14	Jigawa	570,492	1,455,780	1,419,745	2,875,525
15	Kaduna	721,784	2,041,141	1,894,477	3,935,618
16	Kano	1,120,811	2,958,736	2,851,734	5,810,470
17	Katsina	722,000	1,860,658	1,892,475	3,753,133
18	Kebbi	380,996	1,035,723	1,032,767	2,068,490
19	Kogi	395,389	1,039,484	1,108,272	2,147,756
20	Kwara	326,804	773,182	775,230	1,548,412
21	Lagos	1,293,379	3,010,604	2,714,512	5,725,116
22	Niger	454,143	1,252,466	1,169,115	2,421,581
23	Ogun	578,835	1,147,746	1,185,980	2,333,726
24	Ondo	821,231	1,881,884	1,903,454	3,785,338
25	Osun	485,637	1,043,126	1,115,017	2,158,143
26	Oyo	769,525	1,711,428	1,741,292	3,452,720
27	Plateau	578,431	1,657,209	1,655,203	3,312,412
28	Rivers	815,322	2,239,558	2,069,999	4,309,557
29	Sokoto	895,496	2,208,874	2,261,302	4,470,176
30	Taraba	273,951	759,872	752,291	1,512,163
31	Yobe	288,393	714,729	684,958	1,399,687
	COUNTRY TOTAL	17,979,503	44,529,608	44,462,612	88,992,220

The growth rate of 2.83% per annum was used to project the population to 1996, giving a mid-year population of 102.5 million in 1996.

== 2006 population census figures ==
Below is the national summary of the 2006 national population census, which used the de facto method.

S/No	State	Male	Female	Total
1	Abia	1,430,298	1,415,082	2,845,380
2	Adamawa	1,607,270	1,571,680	3,178,950
3	Akwa Ibom	1,983,202	1,918,849	3,902,051
4	Anambra	2,117,984	2,059,844	4,177,828
5	Bauchi	2,369,266	2,283,800	4,253,641
6	Bayelsa	874,083	830,432	1,704,515
7	Benue	2,144,043	2,109,598	4,253,641
8	Borno	2,163,358	2,007,746	4,171,104
9	Cross River	1,471,967	1,421,021	2,892,988
10	Delta	2,069,309	2,043,136	4,112,445
11	Ebonyi	1,064,156	1,112,791	2,176,947
12	Edo	1,633,946	1,599,420	3,233,366
13	Ekiti	1,215,487	1,183,470	2,398,957
14	Enugu	1,596,042	1,671,795	3,267,837
15	FCT	733,172	673,067	1,406,239
16	Gombe	1,244,228	1,120,812	2,365,040
17	Imo	1,976,471	1,951,092	3,927,563
18	Jigawa	2,198,076	2,162,926	4,361,002
19	Kaduna	3,090,438	3,023,065	6,113,503
20	Kano	4,947,952	4,453,336	9,401,288
21	Katsina	2,948279	2,853,305	5,801,584
22	Kebbi	1,631,629	1,624,912	3,256,541
23	Kogi	1,672,903	1,641,140	3,314,043
24	Kwara	1,193,783	1,171,570	2,365,353
25	Lagos	4,719,125	4,394,480	9,113,605
26	Nasarawa	943,801	925,576	1,869,377
27	Niger	2,004,350	1,950,422	3,954,772
28	Ogun	1,864,907	1,886,233	3,751,140
29	Ondo	1,745,057	1,715,820	3,460,877
30	Osun	1,734,149	1,682,810	3,416959
31	Oyo	2,802,432	2,778,462	5,580,894
32	Plateau	1,598,998	1,607,533	3,206,531
33	Rivers	2,673,026	2,525,690	5,198,716
34	Sokoto	1,863,713	1,838,963	3,702,676
35	Taraba	1,171,931	1,122,869	2,294,800
36	Yobe	1,205,034	1,116,305	2,321,339
37	Zamfara	1,641,623	1,637,250	3,278,873
	COUNTRY TOTAL	71,345,488	69,086,302	140,431,790

The annual exponential growth rate was 3.18 percent, between the period of the two Censuses of 1991 and 2006 which was 14 years and 4 months. The sex ratio (number of males per 100 females in the population) was approximately 103 at the national level.

== Controversies and challenges ==
Eze Festus Odimegwu who was appointed Chairman, National Population Commission (NPC), in June 2012, He made several unguarded statements amongst which was his condemnation of the census of 2006. He also said Nigeria has never had a credible population census. Population census in Nigeria carries political and religious implications, thus, some Nigerians, especially of Northern extraction rose in opposition to his comments.

Governor of Kano State in Northern Nigeria, Rabiu Kwankwaso, visited President at the time Goodluck Jonathan and demanded the dismissal of Odimegwu. He was issued a query, and later forced to resign a year into his four-year tenure.

=== 1952/1953 census ===
The 1952/1953 census was staggered and this made the comparability of data between regions difficult. In Northern Nigeria for instance, it was conducted from May to July 1952, while the West and Mid-West, it was held in December 1952, and January 1953, respectively. With World War II disrupting the previous cycle of the decennial census, many Nigerians were suspicious of the purpose, and refused to be counted. The census suffered gross under enumeration.

=== 1962/1963 census crisis ===
The 1962 population census complied with the principle of simultaneity, and held in May 1962. It was widely publicized but politicized, thus, the government rejected the figures and a rerun was held in 1963. The result of the figures were even contested at the Supreme Court, which ruled it lacked jurisdiction for administrative functions of government.

Population figures at the time determined a lot: employment into the federal civil service, revenue allocation, and number of a region's seats in parliament. The final results were unreleased but initial reports showed the North were 22.5 million from 16.5 million in 1952 – an increase of 30 percent. The population of the East had increased by 200 percent and the West by 70 percent. This meant the North had lost its majority by population.

In the re-run of 1963, the population of the North increased by 8.5 million, bringing the population of the North to 31 million.

=== 1973 census controversy ===
The increase in Nigeria's population by 24 million in 10 years made the 1973 census controversial. Many argued that it was inaccurate, and rigged for political and ethnic reasons. Even though the census report was incomplete, the population figures were put at 79,760,000.
