= Uche Secondus =

Nigerian politician (born 1955)

11th Chairman of the PDP National Working Committee
- Incumbent
- Assumed office 10 December 2017 - 2021
- Preceded by: Ahmed Makarfi
- Succeeded by: Iyorchia Ayu

Chairman of the PDP National Working Committee Acting
- In office 20 May 2015 – 16 February 2016

Chairman of the Rivers State People's Democratic Party
- In office 2002–2008
- Preceded by: Marshal Harry
- Succeeded by: Godspower Ake

Personal details
- Born: Prince Uche Secondus; 22 March 1955 (age 71) Andoni, Eastern Region, British Nigeria (now in Rivers State, Nigeria)
- Party: People's Democratic Party
- Spouse: Ene Belema Secondus

Prince Uche Secondus (born 22 March 1955) is a Nigerian businessman, politician, and elder statesman who was the former chairman of the PDP National Working Committee in 2017 and was suspended by the party in 2021. Secondus was acting chairman of the committee from 2015 to 2016. He was the second chairman of the Rivers State People's Democratic Party, a position he held for two terms.

== Early life and education ==
Secondus was born and raised in Andoni. He completed his elementary and secondary education in Rivers State. He further attended the London Chambers of Commerce Institute, where he obtained a certificate in Commerce.

== Political career ==
Secondus' desire to improve the lives of Riverians led to his entering politics during the Second Republic in 1978. He served as Rivers State Youth Leader of the National Party of Nigeria (NPN), Rivers State Publicity Secretary of the National Republican Convention (NRC) (1993 – 1998) and a two-term Chairman of the Rivers State People's Democratic Party. While state party chair, he earned the sobriquet "Total Chairman", and headed an influential group in the National Executive Committee known as G.84.

In 2007, Secondus was the South-South Coordinator for the PDP National Campaign Council that organized the campaigns for the party during that year's general elections. In 2008, at the People's Democratic Party Convention, he gained further promotion to National Organizing Secretary, holding office until 2012. Secondus is the pioneer Chairman of the Governing Board of the National Identity Management Commission (NIMC). On 1 September 2013, he was elected Deputy National Chairman of the People's Democratic Party. He also briefly served as acting National Chairman of the party following the resignation of Adamu Mu'azu in 2015. On 10 December 2017 at the Eagles square, Secondus was elected as the PDP National Working Committee chairman after a contested election. He is regarded as the best PDP chairman ever, as his tenure made PDP win more states as an opposition party.

== See also ==
- List of people from Rivers State
