= Nasir Isa Kwarra =

Chairman of Nigeria's National Population Commission

Hon. Nasir Isa Kwarra
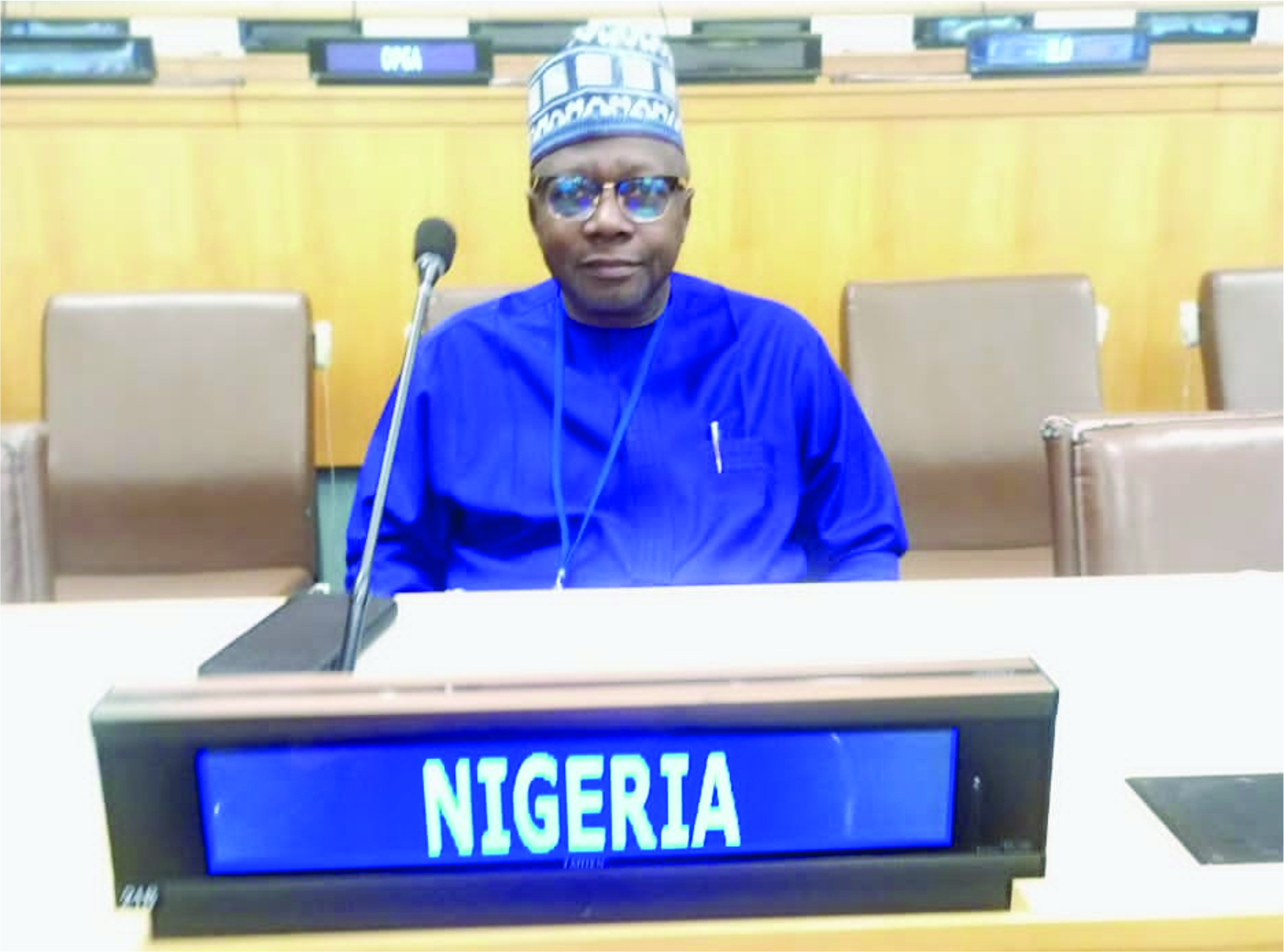
- Born: 4 October 1959 (age 66); Wamba, Nasarawa State Nigeria
- Education: University of Jos
- Employer: Federal Government of Nigeria
- Organization: National Population Commission
- Title: Chairman, National Population Commission
- Term: October 2020 till date
- Predecessor: Eze Duruiheoma, SAN

Nasir Isa Kwarra (born 4 October 1959) is a Nigerian administrator and a former banker who serves as the chairman, National Population Commission, Nigeria. He was appointed Chairman by President Muhammadu Buhari and confirmed by the Nigerian Senate on 15 October 2020.

He began his career as a trainee banking officer in 1986 and became the deputy manager between 1989–1996. He also worked with the Management Board of Petroleum Equalization Fund between 1996–2006 and was the Zonal Manager of Operations. He was the pioneer Commissioner of Finance and Planning, Nasarawa State from 1997–1998. Between 2007–2010 he served as a Member, Nasarawa State Judicial Service Commission. Nasir Isa Kwarra was appointed a Member Board of Directors, Federal Medical Centre Owo, Ondo State 2013 – 2015.

== Early life and education ==
Nasir Isa Kwarra is from Wamba Local Government Area of Nasarawa State. He began his educational pursuit at a tender age. He obtained his West Africa School Certificate from Government College Katsina State Nigeria in 1978. He is also an alumnus of the University of Jos where he obtained a BSc in Economics in 1983 and an MSc in Economics in 1985.

== Career ==
=== Public service ===
Nasir Isa Kwarra has held various positions in the course his Public Service career which has spanned over two decades. He was the pioneer Commissioner of Finance and Planning, Nasarawa State from 1997 – 1998. His Tenure as Federal Commissioner at National Population Commission between 2018 - October 2020 and his background in Planning and Management culminated in his appointment as Chairman National Population Commission (NPC) Nigeria. He has also represented Nigeria at several forums both within and outside the country.

=== National Population Commission ===
Nasir Isa Kwarra was appointed Chairman, National Population Commission in 2020. Upon his appointment he embarked on several reforms aimed at repositioning the Commission in pursuant of its constitutional mandates of providing demographic data for development planning.

He proposed and implemented the first ever digital and Green Census programme in Nigeria which commenced with electronic data collection modules developed within the Commission.

The Green Census Initiative is Kwarra's commitment to making Census more sustainable and environmentally friendly. The initiative will use digital technology to reduce the use of paper and other resources, and it will also promote the use of renewable energy sources during the census.

He believes that with his reforms Censuses in Nigeria will produce accurate, reliable, verifiable and acceptable data in Nigeria and also will be more cost-effective and efficient.

He organized several capacity building workshops to enhance the technical and management efficiency of staff in preparation for Census and other surveys at various levels. He believes workshops are important end-to-end knowledge acquisition platforms for understanding the operations, processes and responsibilities of staff and also develop effective synergy of operations between departments of the Commission.

At the launch of the Revised National Policy on Population for Sustainable Development, Nasir Isa Kwarra, noted that the document would help in effective population management, stressing the need for urgent measures to address Nigeria's high fertility rate, through expanding access to modern contraceptive methods across the country. The policy aims to control population growth and fertility in the Nigeria.

His Vision of an Electronic Civil Registration and Vital Statistics System (eCRVS) and Geo-spatial Data Repository was launched by President Bola Tinubu on 6 November 2023. The digital platform aims to cover all Civil Registrations including birth, stillbirth, and death registrations, birth attestation, adoption, marriage notification, divorce notification, migration. The system is designed to generate accurate and comprehensive demographic data for policy-making, planning, monitoring and evaluation of development programmes and projects.
