= Fasuwa Abayomi Johnson =

Nigerian politician and businessman

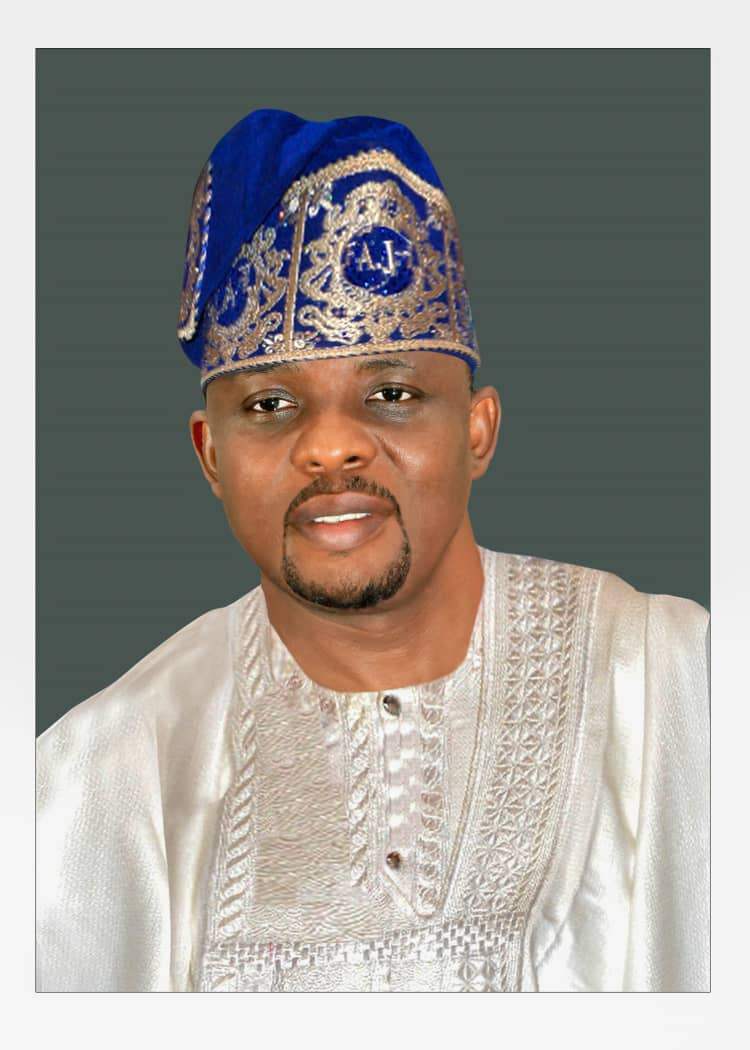
- Born: Ododeyo, Ijebu North East, Ogun State, Nigeria
- Education: Ogun State University (now Olabisi Onabanjo University; BSc) University of Ibadan (MSc) Ladoke Akintola University (MBA) Tai Solarin University of Education (PhD)
- Predecessor: Yeye Oluseyi Aderinokun
- Spouse: Yeye Temitayo Fasuwa
- Children: 3

Fasuwa Abayomi Johnson also referred to as Yomi-FAJ, is a Nigerian politician and businessman, who serves as a Federal commissioner of the representing Ogun State in the Nigerian National Population Commission.

== Early life and education ==
Fasuwa Abayomi Johnson was born in Ododeyo, Ijebu North-East, Ogun State, Nigeria. He attended St. Michael Primary School, Ododeyo for his primary education, and then moved on to Deyo Tuwo Comprehensive High School for his secondary education.

Johnson continued his higher education at Ogun State University (now Olabisi Onabanjo University, Ago Iwoye), where he graduated with a degree in Geography and Regional Planning in 1998. In 2004, he obtained a Master of Science degree in Geography from the University of Ibadan. He furthered his education and in 2012 obtained a Master of Business Administration (MBA) from Ladoke Akintola University, specializing in marketing. In 2020, Johnson began his PhD in Geography and Environmental Management at Tai Solarin University of Education, focusing on Climate Change and River Basin Management. which he concluded in 2024.

== Career ==
=== Corporate services ===
Johnson began his professional career in corporate services, working in consulting, fast-moving consumer goods (FMCG), and electronics.

He started his career at Akintola Williams Deloitte in 2003, a consultancy firm, before moving on to the Nigerian Bottling Company, where he contributed to the marketing and sales of Coca-Cola products. Later, he joined FrieslandCampina, where he served as Senior Sales Manager for the company's Peak dairy product. He also played a role as National Sales Manager for Royal Philips Netherlands, a position he held from 2013 to 2018.

=== Political career ===
Johnson's political career began in 2014, when he contested for the Ogun State House of Assembly but lost. He contested again in 2019, and was elected member of the Ogun state house of assembly representing Ijebu North East state constituency. During his tenure, he focused on infrastructure development and community engagement, constituency and local governance.

In 2024, Johnson was nominated as a Federal Commissioner in the National Population Commission representing Ogun State under the administration of President Bola Tinubu. His work in this role involved overseeing national census operations and demographic planning, and he worked to improve data collection for national population policies.

=== National Population Commission ===
In 2024, Johnson was appointed to the National Population Commission (NPC) as a Federal Commissioner, representing Ogun State. His responsibilities include overseeing census operations, demographic planning, and population data management for the nation. As part of the NPC, he works to ensure that Nigeria's population data is accurately collected, analyzed, and used for national development policies, especially in areas such as healthcare, education, and infrastructure planning.

== Personal life ==
Fasuwa Johnson is married, with three children.

== Titles and honors ==
In recognition of his contributions to public service and his community, Johnson holds the title of Otunba Apesin of Ilugun-South Ijebu and Apesin of Igbeba Land. The title of Otunba is a traditional honor in Nigeria, typically awarded to individuals who have made significant contributions to their communities, often in leadership, philanthropy, or service.
