= Okey Amadi =

Nigerian politician

Okey Amadi is a progressive politician in Rivers State, Nigeria. He was a member of the Rivers State House of Assembly from 1999 to 2007, representing the constituency of Etche I for the People's Democratic Party. Between 2011 and 2015, he served as Commissioner of the Rivers State Ministry of Energy and Natural Resources.
