= Go Round F.C. =

Nigerian football club

- Full name: Go Round Football Club
- Founded: 1994; 32 years ago
- Stadium: Krisdera Hotel Stadium
- Capacity: 1,000
- Owner: Felix A. Obuah
- Manager: Soni Uboh

Go Round Football Club is an association football club based in Omoku, Rivers State, Nigeria. They play their home games at Krisdera Hotel Stadium, and currently compete in the NNL, the second-tier in Nigerian football. The team is owned by Felix A. Obuah and coached by Ngozi Elechi. The team's general manager as of March 2016 is Soni Uboh.

== History ==
They were promoted to the Nigeria Premier League for the first time in 2017 on the last day of the league season.

=== Federation Cup ===
Go Round secured qualification to the 2016 national Federation Cup on 3 April 2016. They defeated Rivers United F.C. 4–2 in a penalty shoot-out after a 1–1 draw in the final of the state competition.

The team was relegated in 2018/2019 season of the Nigerian Professional Football League to the Nigeria National League after it failed to secure several wins.

== Current squad ==
As of January 2019

Note: Flags indicate national team as defined under FIFA eligibility rules; some limited exceptions apply. Players may hold more than one non-FIFA nationality.

No.	Pos.	Nation	Player
1	GK	NGA	Stanley Nwabili
2	DF	NGA	Ebuka Akobundu
3	DF	NGA	Philip Johnson
5	DF	NGA	Akaba Otega
7	FW	NGA	Sodiq Ololade
8	MF	NGA	Stanley Worlu
9	FW	NGA	Shadrack Oghali
10	FW	NGA	Samuel Stone Onukwube
13	DF	NGA	Adeleke Adekunle
14	MF	NGA	Maurice Chukwu
—	FW	NGA	Ugwu Onyedikachi

No.	Pos.	Nation	Player
24	GK	NGA	Godwin Dede
29	FW	NGA	Ifeanyi Anyanwu
—	FW	NGA	Junior Ogar
—	DF	NGA	George Vincent
—	DF	NGA	Akinwale Ogunjobi
—	MF	NGA	Chinonye Chinda
—	MF	NGA	Henry Ochuba
—	GK	NGA	Joseph Onwuga
—		NGA	Odinaka Onyirumba
—		NGA	Ufere Chinedu
—		NGA	Chile Azu
