= Major Jack =

Nigerian politician

Major Jack (born 24 June) is a Riverian engineer and politician from Abonnema and the incumbent Deputy Chief Whip of the Rivers State House of Assembly. He is representing Akuku-Toru I constituency and is a member of the Rivers State People's Democratic Party.

He won as MHA during the election rerun on 19 March 2016 with 11,624 votes, defeating All Progressives Congress' Ineye Jack who got 810 votes.
