= Roseberry Briggs =

Nigerian politician

Roseberry Robinson Briggs (1925–2013), sometimes spelled Rosebery, was a Nigerian politician of the National Party of Nigeria. He was the first Speaker of the Rivers State House of Assembly, serving two consecutive terms from 1979 until December 1984 when the military coup ended civilian rule in Nigeria. He died in 2013, at the age of 88.

== See also ==
- List of people from Rivers State
