= George Thompson Sekibo =

Nigerian politician

George Thompson Sekibo CON

Senator of the Federal Republic of Nigeria
- Incumbent
- Assumed office June 2007
- Preceded by: John Azuta-Mbata
- Constituency: Rivers East

Personal details
- Born: 1 April 1957 (age 69) Ogu Town, Rivers State, Nigeria
- Party: People's Democratic Party (PDP)
- Spouse: Mrs. Asime G.T Sekibo
- Education: Rivers State University of Science and Technology
- Profession: Architect, Politician

Senator George Thompson Sekibo CON is a Nigerian senator who represents the People's Democratic Party (PDP) in Rivers State. He became a member of the Nigerian Senate in 2007.

== Background ==
George Thompson Sekibo was born on 1 April 1957 in Ogu Town, Rivers State. He obtained a B. Tech Architecture from Rivers State University of Science and Technology, Port Harcourt, and a M. Eng. in Environmental Engineering from the University of Port Harcourt, Choba.

He was Chairman/Prefect in some Local Governments in the Rivers State area from 1988 – 1989. He was the organizing secretary of the Democratic Party of Nigeria in Rivers State in 1997 – 1998, Special Adviser on Projects and Special Adviser on works to the Governor of Rivers State 1999 – 2002.

George Thompson Sekibo was elected to the National House of Representatives for the Ogu/Bolo/Okrika constituency of Rivers State for the 2003 – 2007 term.

== Senate career ==
George Thompson Sekibo was elected to the Senate in 2007 as a Senator representing Rivers East. His 2007 election was disputed, but in December 2008 was upheld by the Court of Appeal. He was appointed to Senate committees on Niger Delta, Gas, Federal Character & Inter-Government Affairs, Environment, Downstream Petroleum and Commerce.

In January 2008, Sekibo raised concern that the Rivers State governor Rotimi Chibuike Amaechi was potentially causing tension between the Okrika and Ikwerre communities by his ultimatum to the Okrika community to produce warlord Ateke Tom. He advised the governor to use his legal security apparatus to apprehend Ateke. However, in July 2009, Senator Sekibo affirmed his support for governor Amaechi.

In January 2009, Senator Sekibo voiced the strained relations between the senate and president Umaru Musa Yar'Adua, raising a point of order when the president did not formally inform the senate that he was proceeding on a two-week vacation, and on that basis questioning whether the senate should recognize Vice President Goodluck Jonathan as the acting president.

As chairman of the Senate Committee on Solid Minerals Sekibo severely criticized the Solid Minerals Ministry for failing to release $10 million granted by the World Bank to assist artisanal miners in the country. In February 2009, Senator Sekibo sponsored a probe into misuse of the Development of Natural Resources Fund (DNRF) and related funds operated without National Assembly (NASS) approval. In April 2009, Sekibo's Committee on Solid Minerals said that Julius Berger Nigeria may have been illegally exporting granites from quarry sites in Ebonyi State.

In May 2009, a row broke out when it was revealed that ten Senate members had been on an all-expense-paid trip to Ghana, with the implication that they were being influenced by Petroleum and Gas producers. The members were referred to the Committee on Ethics, Privileges and Public Petitions for investigation following a point of order raised by Senator Sekibo.

Sekibo ran for reelection as Rivers East Senator on the PDP ticket in April 2011. He won with 198,414 votes, easily defeating Lasbry Amadi of the Action Congress of Nigeria (ACN) who gained 58,182 votes and Chigozie Orlu of All Progressives Grand Alliance (APGA) with 13,605 votes.
