= Omoku =

Capital City & headquarter of Ogba/Egbema/Ndoni, Rivers State

- city
- Nickname: Oil City 3
- Location of Omoku in Nigeria
- Coordinates: 5.342°N 6.656°E
- State: Rivers State
- Local Government Area: Ogba/Egbema/Ndoni

Government
  - Governor: Siminalayi Fubara PDP

Area
  - Total: 52 km^{2} (20 sq mi)
  - Land: 52 km^{2} (20 sq mi)

Population (2012)
  - Total: 320,000
- estimated
- Time zone: UTC+1 (CET/WAT)

Omoku is a town in Rivers State, Nigeria with about 320,000 people. It Is located in the Northern part of the state, near the boundary with Delta State and Imo State. It is the headquarters of Ogba/Egbema/Ndoni Local Government Area and one of the major cities of the Ogba people and Rivers State of Nigeria with latitude 5° 20' 37.97" N and longitude 6° 39' 24.62" E. It is also the capital seat of the Oba of Ogba land, and a home to the Federal College of Education (Technical). The indigenes speak Ogba of the Igboid language family.

Oil companies that operate there include Shell Petroleum Development Company, Total Energies, and Nigerian Agip Oil Company. The city's infrastructure has been improved by constructing dual carriageway roads, a power generation plant, and banks.

There are two festivals celebrated by the people of Omoku called NCHAKA & OKUROSO (masquerade) festivals; the Nchaka festival is celebrated in late November or early December, while the Okuroso is celebrated between January and February every year. Other cultural festivals celebrated Omoku are Igba-Ogwe, Ebiam, Egwi-Iji Onube, and Egwu-Ohali.

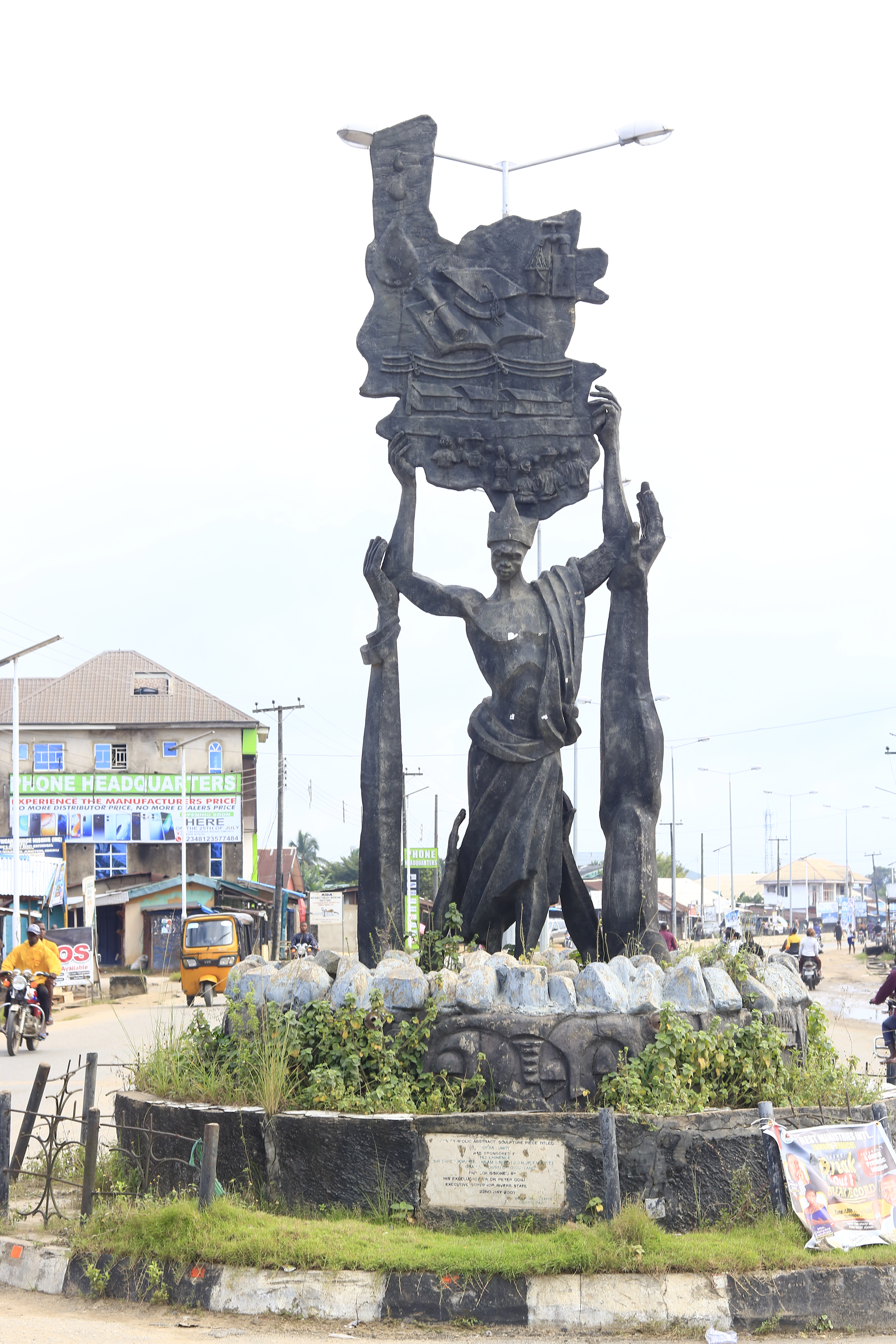
A statue in Omoku

== Sports ==
Go Round F.C.The football club play in the top-flight Nigerian Premier League from 2018. It's a football club based in Omoku, Rivers State, Nigeria. They play their home game at Krisdera Hotel Stadium. The club is owned by Felix A. Obuah and coached by Ngozi Elechi.

== Education ==
Omoku is home to different levels of education (primary, secondary and tertiary).

=== Primary and Secondary Schools ===
- Fantastic International Academy
- Church Of God Seventh Day Academy
- Kings and Queens Schools
- Ogba Comprehensive High School
- BOLYM Wisdom Academy International, Omoku
- Immaculate Comprehensive School
- Community Girls Secondary School Omoku
- Santa Maria High School Omoku
- Gifted-Chosen Model School Omoku

=== Higher Institutions ===
- Federal College of Education (Technical) Omoku

== Notable Figures ==
Some notable figures in the Omoku are, Late Prof. Claude Ake, who advocated for the environmental justice of the Niger Delta alongside late Ken Saro-wiwa. He was an unweaving critic of political violence and corruption in Nigeria and across Africa. He believed that the power in Africa could be used positively.

Prof. Blessing Esuru Ahiauzu. A professor of Library studies in the Rivers State University and first female chief in Ogbaland. As a scholar and Christian, she believed in using the Ogba language as a driver of unity and progress. She is also the mother of Singer and Musician, Ric Hassani. And Widow to late Okechukwu Ahiauzu. She has also served as an acting VC in the Rivers state University and the University Librarian.

== Activities ==
The Ogba people are known primarily for fishing and farming.

== Religion ==
Ogba people are mostly Seventh Day Adventists. Before the coming of other religious fellowship, they first embraced the Seventh Day Adventist fellowship. So, most of them approximately 3,000 indigenes from that area are members of the Seventh Day Adventists.

== Climate/Temperature ==
Omoku has year-round weather, with the wet season being warm and cloudy and the dry season being hot and generally cloudy. The average annual temperature fluctuates between 21 °C (69 °F) and 31 °C (88 °F); it is rarely lower or higher than 16 °C (61 °F) or 33 °C (91 °F).
