= Federal College of Education (Technical), Omoku =

Federal government higher education institution in Omoku, Nigeria

- Type: Public
- Established: 1989
- Affiliations: University of Nigeria
- Provost: Lady Dr. Doris Oganno Okoroh
- Location: Omoku, Rivers State, Nigeria
- Website: Official website

The Federal College of Education (Technical), Omoku is a federal government higher education institution located in Omoku, Rivers State, South-South, Nigeria. It is funded and managed by the Federal government of Nigeria. It is affiliated to University of Nigeria for its degree programmes. The current Provost is Emmanuel Ikenyiri.

He was reappointed during President Muhammadu Buhari administration in year 2022 to serve as the 7th Substansive Provost of the College.

== History ==
The Federal College of Education (Technical), Omoku (fcetomoku) was established in the 1989. It is located in Rivers State, South-South, Nigeria. It is funded and Managed by the Federal government of Nigeria. The college is dedicated to preparing students to become teachers who meet international standards. The college offers full-time courses in sciences and social sciences, attracting a diverse student population.

== Library ==
The college library has information resources that support both teaching and learning for lecturers and students.

== Courses ==
The institution offers the following courses;

- Political Science Education
- Music Education
- Computer Education
- Igbo Education
- Biology Education
- Chemistry Education
- Agricultural Education
- Primary Education
- Early Childhood Care Education
- Home Economics Education
- Adult and Non-Formal Education
- Economics Education
- English Education
- Computer Education
- Business Education
- Integrated Science Education
- French
- Theatre Arts
- Education Fine and Applied Arts
- Special Education
- Physics Education
- Social Studies
- Mathematics Education
- Technical Education

== Affiliation ==
The institution is affiliated with the University of Nigeria to offer programmes leading to Bachelor of Education, (B.Ed.) in;

- Education and Biology
- Education and Mathematics
- Industrial Technical Education
- Home Economics And Education
- Education and Chemistry
- Education and Fine & Applied Arts
- Education and Computer Science
- Agricultural Science And Education
- Education and Computer Science
- Education and Physics
- Business Education
