= Adams Dabotorudima =

Nigerian politician

Adams Dabotorudima is a Nigerian politician who is the current Speaker of the Rivers State House of Assembly and the Representative from Okrika to the House of Assembly. He was elected in December 2015 to replace Ikuinyi Owaji Ibani who had resigned for personal reasons.
