= Benibo Anabraba =

Nigerian politician

Benibo Frederick Anabraba is a politician in Rivers State, Nigeria. He is the Member of the Rivers State House of Assembly for Akuku-Toru II and current Minority Leader of the Rivers State House of Assembly. He was first elected to the House of Assembly in the 2011 general election as a member of the People's Democratic Party. He later switched allegiance to the All Progressives Congress in an act of loyalty to Governor Chibuike Amaechi.
