= Rivers State Waste Management Agency =

Government environment agency in Nigeria

Coordinates: 4.810344°N 6.984961°E

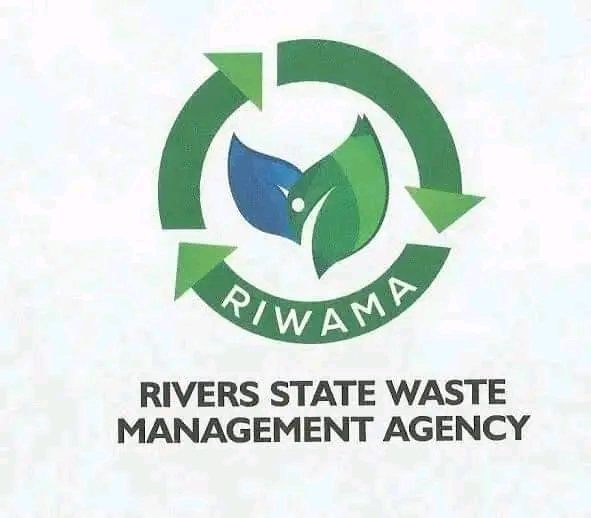
Rivers State Waste Management Agency RIWAMA Logo

Agency overview
- Formed: 2013 == Sole Administrator == Ag. Sole Administrator = Hon. Ohia Prince Obi(DSSRS,JP)

The Rivers State Waste Management Agency (RIWAMA) is a government of Rivers State body responsible for the enhancement of the environment with the aim of achieving positive and substantial change in living conditions as well as reducing diseases or health problems in the state. It was created in 2013 by the Rivers State House of Assembly and was assented to by the state governor in July 2014. Prior to this, the agency had functioned as "Rivers State Environmental Sanitation Authority (RSESA)" which originally was formed in 1983 to tackle municipal waste and other related issues.The current Sole Administrator is Hon. Ohia Prince Obi, the Special Adviser to the Executive Governor of Rivers State, Sir Siminialayi Fubara

== See also ==
- List of government agencies of Rivers State
- Rivers State Ministry of Environment
