= Adeleke Adekunle =

Nigerian footballer (born 2002)

Personal information
- Date of birth: 27 July 2002 (age 24)
- Place of birth: Maiduguri, Nigeria
- Height: 1.75 m (5 ft 9 in)
- Position: Defender

Team information
- Current team: Maccabi Jaffa

Senior career*
Years	Team	Apps	(Gls)
2019	Go Round		
2019–2021	Abia Warriors	39	(0)
2021–2023	Enyimba	30	(0)
2023–2024	Rivers United	3	(0)
2024	Sporting Lagos	17	(0)
2024–	Maccabi Jaffa	0	(0)

International career^{‡}
2021–	Nigeria	1	(0)
- * Club domestic league appearances and goals as of 01:14, 8 April 2022 (UTC) ‡ National team caps and goals as of 01:14, 8 April 2022 (UTC)

Adeleke Adekunle (born 27 July 2002) is a Nigerian professional footballer who currently plays as a defender for Maccabi Jaffa and the Nigeria national team.

== Career statistics ==
=== Club ===
As of 1 June 2024.

Appearances and goals by club, season and competition
Club	Season	League			Cup		Other		Total	
Club	Season	Division	Apps	Goals	Apps	Goals	Apps	Goals	Apps	Goals
Abia Warriors	2019–20	NPFL	10	0	0	0	0	0	10	0
Abia Warriors	2020–21	NPFL	29	0	0	0	0	0	29	0
Abia Warriors	Total		39	0	0	0	0	0	39	0
Enyimba	2021–22	NPFL	25	0	0	0	3 (Note: Appearances in the CAF Confederation Cup)	0	28	0
Enyimba	2022–23	NPFL	5	0	0	0	0	0	5	0
Enyimba	Total		30	0	0	3	0	0	33	0
Rivers United	2023–24	NPFL	3	0	0	0	0	0	3	0
Sporting Lagos	2023–24	NPFL	17	0	0	0	0	0	17	0
Maccabi Jaffa	2024–25	INL	0	0	0	0	0	0	0	0
Career total			89	0	0	0	3	0	92	0

=== International ===
As of matches played 8 April 2022.

Appearances and goals by national team and year
National team	Year	Apps	Goals
Nigeria	2021	1	0
Total		1	0
