= Michael O. Chinda =

Nigerian politician

Michael Okechukwu Chinda is a Nigerian politician, Estate Surveyor and Public Administrator. He was a Member of the House of Assembly representing the Obio-Akpor II assembly constituency in the Rivers State House of Assembly, Nigeria. He is a member of the Rivers State People's Democratic Party. He was first elected in 2011, and in a March 2016 election rerun was reelected to the Assembly. He was again reelected in 2019 and held office until 2023.

== Legislative career ==
As a Member of the Rivers State House of Assembly, Michael Chinda championed and ultimately sponsored the Prohibition of the Curtailment of Women's Right to inherit property. A landmark legislation which protects the rights of women in the state to inherit property.

The Bill was later passed into law in 2022 by the sitting Governor, Ezenwo Nyesom Wike and in the following year, 4 sisters became the first beneficiaries of the law, winning a landmark case fighting discrimination from their brothers over the right to inherit property. They were awarded damages of 2 Million Naira.

== Federal Capital Territory Administration ==
Following the conclusion of his tenure with the Rivers State House of Assembly in 2023, Michael Chinda was appointed as Senior Special Assistant on Lands, Urban and Regional Planning to the Minister of the Federal Capital Territory, Ezenwo Nyesom Wike, within the Federal Capital Territory Administration (FCTA).

== Honours and Recognitions ==
In terms of Hounours and Recognition, Michael Chinda has been conferred with the rank of "Fellow" of the Nigerian Institute of Estate Surveyors and Valuers, the highest achievable rank within the institute. He has also been awarded the Distinguished Service Star of Rivers State (DSSRS) acknowleding his contributions to Nigeria's oil-rich state.
