= Lee Maeba =

Nigerian politician

Lee Ledogo Maeba

Senator of the Federal Republic of Nigeria
- In office May 2003 – May 2011
- Preceded by: Magnus Ngei Abe
- Constituency: Rivers State South East

Personal details
- Born: February 1966 (age 60) luwa- ogoni- rivers state
- Party: People's Democratic Party (PDP)
- Spouse: Mrs Aya Maeba
- Children: 4 children
- Occupation: Politician

Lee Ledogo Maeba is a Nigerian politician who was elected senator for the Rivers State South East constituency on the People's Democratic Party (PDP) platform in April 2003, at age 37, and was reelected in April 2007. As of 15 March 2004, Maeba was a member of the Pan-African Parliament.

Maeba was born in February 1966. He obtained a BSc Degree in Technology from University of Science and Technology, Port Harcourt. Before becoming a senator he was a justice of the peace and a state party vice chairman. He is married to Mrs. Aya Maeba, who also is from a family of politicians. In a May 2009 survey of senatorial performance in the 6th National Assembly, ThisDay noted that he had sponsored several bills related to oil exploitation, and gave him an "average" rating.
