= Cyprian Edward-Ekpo =

Nigerian legal scholar and human rights advocate

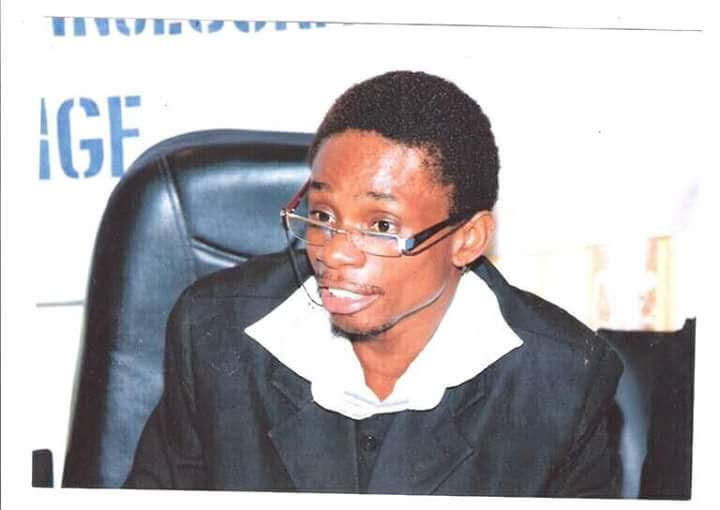
- Cyprian in 2024
- Occupations: Human rights advocate, author, legal scholar

Cyprian Edward-Ekpo is an author, prolific writer, legal scholar, researcher, public affairs analyst, human rights advocate, and institutional administrator. He currently serves as president and director-general, Institute of Law Research & Development of United Nations (ILAWDUN) based in Washington DC, USA and he is a managing partner and dean of research at Multi-Intelligence Development Company, a legal consulting firm.

== Career ==
Edward-Ekpo served at the Senate of Nigeria as an advisor to the Committee on Environment and Ecology from 2012 to 2018 and served in similar roles at agencies and corporate institutions in Africa and Europe. He currently serves as the dean of research and managing partner of Multi-Intelligence Development Company, a legal consulting firm with focus on intellectual property law, oil and gas and environment. He is the principal executive director and member of the board of Universal School of Eclectic Analysis, Legal Research & Law Studies, Suffolk, United Kingdom and currently serves as president and director-general, Institute of Law Research & Development of United Nations (ILAWDUN) an autonomous institute that conducts research in international law at all levels based in Washington DC, USA.
