= Alabo Dakorinama George-Kelly =

Nigerian politician and technocrat

Commissioner for Works, Rivers State
- In office 2022–2023
- Governor: Nyesom Wike

Personal details
- Party: Peoples Democratic Party
- Occupation: Quantity surveyor, politician

Dr. Alabo George-Kelly, also known as Alabo Dakorinama George Kelly (born 23 December), is a Nigerian politician and technocrat. The Kalabari-Ijaw born surveyor was appointed the honourable commissioner, Rivers State Ministry of Works by Nyesom Wike, Governor of Rivers State. Prior to his appointment into the Executive Council of Rivers State, he was a principal manager (infrastructure) in the Niger Delta Development Commission. He also contested the Rivers State 2022 People's Democratic Party gubernatorial primary election, where he came second after Sir Siminalayi Fubara, the governor-elect of Rivers State.
