= Ikuinyi O. Ibani =

Nigerian politician

Ikuinyi Owaji Ibani is a Nigerian politician and Speaker of the Rivers State House of Assembly. From 2007 to 2011, he served as MHA representing the constituency of Andoni, and from 2011 to 2015, was the Chief Whip of the House. He is a member of the People's Democratic Party. In the 8th Assembly election, he defeated his All Progressives Congress rival by over 50,000 votes.

On 19 December 2015, Ibani announced his resignation from the office of Speaker, citing personal reasons. He was replaced by Adams Dabotorudima from Okrika. In December 2016, Ibani was re-elected as the Speaker of the Rivers State House of Assembly.

== See also ==
- List of people from Rivers State
