= Siminalayi Fubara =

Nigerian accountant and politician (born 1975)

His Excellency Siminalayi Fubara DSSRS, FCA
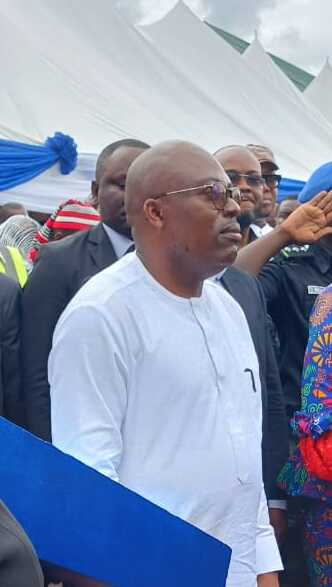

Governor of Rivers State
- Incumbent
- Assumed office 18 September 2025
- Deputy: Ngozi Odu
- Preceded by: Ibok Ekwe Ibas (as sole administrator)
- In office 23 May 2023 – 18 March 2025
- Deputy: Ngozi Odu
- Preceded by: Nyesom Wike
- Succeeded by: Ibok Ekwe Ibas (as sole administrator)

Personal details
- Born: 28 January 1975 (age 51) Opobo, Rivers State, Nigeria
- Citizenship: Nigeria
- Party: All Progressives Congress (since December 2025)
- Other political affiliations: People's Democratic Party (2023–2025)
- Spouse: Valerie Fubara
- Children: 3
- Education: Rivers State University; University of Port Harcourt
- Cabinet: Cabinet of Siminalayi Fubara

Amaopusenibo Siminalayi Fubara (born Siminalayi Joseph Fubara; 28 January 1975) is a Nigerian politician and accountant who has served as the governor of Rivers State since 23 May 2023. A member of the All Progressives Congress since December 2025, Fubara was suspended as governor on 18 March 2025 following an emergency rule by President Bola Tinubu. On 18 September 2025, he was re-instated.

Fubara was born and raised in the Opobo, Rivers State, Nigeria. He attended Opobo Primary School and Comprehensive Secondary School, Opobo for his primary and secondary school education respectively. He had his business education at Rivers State University, where he obtained his degree in business education, postgraduate degree in accounting from Enugu State University of Science and Technology, and MSc in Finance and MBA from the Business School of the University of Port Harcourt. Starting his career in 2003 as the principal accountant of the Rivers State Senior Secondary Schools Board, he rose to being the Director of Finance and Accounts of the state in 2015. He also became the Permanent Secretary in 2020 before becoming the Accountant General of the state on 23 December 2020, a position he held until May 2022.

Fubara sought for governorship in 2023 after he won the primary election for PDP. He emerged as the governor in May 2023 under the party. He assumed office but was later suspended and replaced by Ibok Ekwe Ibas on 18 March 2025. His suspension gained international attention and led to the condemnation of political violence by prominent domestic and international figures. He received the 2023 International Peace Prize Medal Award from TheNigerian, a UK magazine . He is also a Fellow of the Nigerian Institute of Management and the Association of National Accountants of Nigeria.

== Early life and education ==
Siminalayi Fubara was born on 28 January 1975 as the second out of five children in Opobo, Rivers State, Nigeria. His father, Joseph Fubara was a former military soldier while his mother, Love Fubara was a civil servant. Fubara attended his primary education at Opobo Primary School in 1986 and his secondary education at Comprehensive Secondary School, Opobo in 1992. He proceeded to Rivers State University, where he obtained his degree in business education. He also had his postgraduate degree in accounting at Enugu State University of Science and Technology. He obtained his MSc in Finance as well as MBA from the University of Port Harcourt's Business School.

== Career ==
Fubara started his career in 2003 as a Principal Accountant with the Rivers State Senior Secondary Schools Board. He rose to the position of Director of Finance and Accounts at the State's government house in 2015 and rose to the position of Permanent Secretary in March 2020. He was appointed the Accountant General of Rivers State on 23 December 2020, up till May 2022, when he won the People's Democratic Party governorship primaries for the 2023 general elections.

He is a Fellow of the Nigerian Institute of Management, Fellow of Association of National Accountants of Nigeria.

== Governor of Rivers State ==
=== Election ===
Fubara won the PDP governorship primary election on 26 May 2022. He got 721 votes over the 16 other candidates for the primary election. Other contestants included Isaac Kamalu, who had 86 votes; Alabo Dakorinama George-Kelly with 37 votes, and Tammy Danagogo with 36 votes. He was widely reported to be endorsed by Nyesom Wike. On 20 March 2023, he won the Rivers State governorship election. The Independent National Electoral Commission declared him the winner with 302,614 popular votes over other candidates: Tonye Cole of All Progressives Congress with 95,274 popular votes, and Beatrice Itubo of Labour Party with 22,224 popular votes.

Fubara was officially inaugurated on 29 May 2023 along his deputy Ngozi Odu. The event was attended by Samuel Ortom, Ayodele Fayose, and former governor of Rivers State Peter Odili, among others.

=== Tenure and suspension ===
The political crisis in Rivers State increased during a reported feud rooted in power struggles between Siminalayi Fubara and his predecessor Nyesom Wike, who serves as the Minister of the Federal Capital Territory as well as a godfather. When he became the governor in May 2023, many reporters says he was Wike's protégé. According to The Nigerian Observer, supporters of Fubara accused Wike calling him a "meddlesome interloper who, rather than concentrate on his hectic ministerial duties, chose to be overbearing in the affairs of Rivers State". They argued that during the tenure of Wike, his predecessor Rotimi Amaechi didn't meddle with his administration.

Series of power struggle eloped ahead of the 2027 governorship election. There were also series of moves to impeach the governor. Meanwhile, impeachment always spark street protests, legal issues, and state violence. Towards the end of 2023, the Rivers State House of Assembly split thereby creating Martins Amaewhule led assembly and Victor Oko-Jumbo led assembly. Fubara validated the Oko-Jumbo led assembly. The House of Assembly's building was also burnt. Following these moves, President Bola Tinubu had a meeting with Fubara in December 2023 at Abuja, where he asked him to recognise Martins Amaewhule as the Speaker of the House of Assembly along other members who defected to APC.

A ruling by the Supreme Court on 28 February 2025 gave validity to the Amaewhule led assembly. The court also ruled for the end of funding from the federal government to the state. The ruling declared the local government election conducted by Fubara on 5 October 2024 as invalid as well as fired the various elected chairmen of the areas. Natives threatens to tamper with oil installations if Fubara gets impeached. There was an explosion which targeted a section of the Trans-Niger Pipeline in Gonna, and another explosion of a pipeline manifold at Ogba-Egbema-Ndoni.

On 18 March 2025, Fubara along all his cabinet and members of the Assembly was suspended by Bola Tinubu, who declared a state of emergency in Rivers State. According to the president, there's an "intense political instability and crisis which has paralysed governance and threatened national stability". He made the statement in a broadcast.

By this declaration, the Governor of Rivers State, Mr Siminalayi Fubara, his deputy, Mrs Ngozi Odu, and all elected members of the House of Assembly of Rivers State are hereby suspended for an initial period of six months.

Former Chief of the Nigerian Navy, Ibok Ekwe Ibas became the sole administrator of the state until the suspension was lifted on 18 September 2025.

On 9 December 2025, Fubara defected from PDP to APC. Following his move, 17 members of the state's House of Assembly led by Speaker Martin Amaewhule also defected to APC.

=== Reactions to the suspension and reinstatement ===
Following the suspension and reinstatement, the national publicity secretary of the African Democratic Congress (ADC), Bolaji Abdullahi issued a statement describing such move by the president as "a dangerous precedent that could weaken Nigeria's democracy and encourage federal overreach." The party also warned that such issue poses "a serious risk to constitutional governance and the balance of power between federal and state authorities". The party also charged the federal court to interpret the section 305 of the Nigerian constitution citing that the constitution provides for emergency rule in situations like solving unconstitutional issues, and public dangers like floods, epidemics, or insurrections.

Seven state governments, led by governors from the opposition PDP party sued President Bola Tinubu at the Supreme Court of Nigeria. According to Legit.ng, lawyer Festus Ogun argued that "President Bola Tinubu has no constitutional power to suspend Rivers State Governor Siminalayi Fubara and his deputy. While the President may declare a state of emergency, he is not legally empowered to remove elected officials." Another human rights lawyer and activist Inibehe Effiong followed the same view when he said, "President Tinubu has no constitutional authority to suspend the Governor of Rivers State or members of the Rivers State House of Assembly. The emergency powers outlined in the 1999 Constitution do not grant him such authority".

== Controversy ==
In May 2022, Fubara and 58 other government officials were declared wanted by the Economic and Financial Crimes Commission for a NGN 435 billion fraud. He was also wanted for a NGN 117 billion fraud alongside four other Rivers State government officials. Additional charges by the EFCC included alleged criminal conspiracy, money laundering, misappropriation of public funds, and abuse of office.

== Personal life ==
Fubara is the second of five children and the first son of Late Joseph Fubara, a former soldier who had an overseas training tour of duty, and Late Love Fubara, a civil servant. He is also a knight of St. Christopher (KSC) Order of Church of Nigeria Anglican Communion. He holds the traditional title of Amaopu-Senibo of Opobo Kingdom. He is married to Valerie Fubara and they have three children.
