= Martins Amaewhule =

Nigerian politician

Martins Chike Amaewhule is a Nigerian politician who serves as the Speaker of the 10th Assembly of the Rivers State House of Assembly. He previously served as Majority Leader of the House.

He represents the Obio-Akpor I constituency in the Assembly. A loyal member of the Rivers State Peoples Democratic Party He was first elected in 2011 and re-elected in the March 2016 election rerun.
