= Ahoada East I (Assembly constituency) =

Constituency of the Rivers State House of Assembly

Ahoada East I Assembly constituency is a constituency of the Rivers State House of Assembly, Nigeria.

As part of the major achievements of his government, the governor of Rivers State, Nyesom Wike delivered the Edeoha market and the UBE primary school, Idoke to the people of the constituency.

== Members of the House of Assembly ==
- 1999: Hon. Osinakachukwu Ideozu
- 2003: Hon. Douglas Ikerechi
- 2007: Hon. Ewor Nname
- 2011: Hon. Ewor Nname
- 2015: Hon. Martyns Mannah
