= Gokana (Assembly constituency) =

Gokana Assembly constituency is a constituency of the Rivers State House of Assembly, Nigeria.

== Members of the House of Assembly ==
- 1999: Hon. Magnus Ngei Abe(Bera)
- 2003: Hon. Gabriel Pidomson (Bodo)
- 2007: Hon. Barinyima Badom (B. Dere)
- 2011: Hon. Innocent Barikor (Bomu)
- 2019: Hon. Dumle Maol (B. Dere)
