= Speaker of the Rivers State House of Assembly =

Speaker of the House of Assembly
- Incumbent; Ikuinyi O. Ibani since December 2016
- Style: The Honourable
- Appointer: Elected by the Rivers State House of Assembly
- Inaugural holder: Roseberry Briggs
- Formation: October 1979

The Speaker of the Rivers State House of Assembly is the political head of the legislative body in Rivers State, Nigeria.

Elected by the Members of the House, the speaker's primary responsibility is to preside over the sittings and deliberations of the Assembly. The Speaker also represents the voters of his or her constituency. Since 1979, there have been eight legislative assemblies with nine people holding the office of Speaker.

== List of speakers of the Rivers State House of Assembly ==
Speaker	Constituency
Roseberry Briggs	Degema III
Talford Ongolo	Southern Ijaw I
Tuesday Kemeagbeye	Ekeremor II
Claudius Enegesi	Ogbia I
Ezekwem Stephen	Ahoada II
Chibuike Amaechi	Ikwerre
Tonye Harry	Degema
Otelemaba Amachree	Asari-Toru I
Ikuinyi O. Ibani	Andoni
Adams Dabotorudima	Okrika

== See also ==
- Rivers State House of Assembly
- Government of Rivers State
