= Rivers State Peoples Democratic Party =

State chapter of the Peoples Democratic Party in Rivers State, Nigeria

- Chairperson: Felix Obuah
- General Secretary: Ibiba Walter
- Spokesperson: Engr Samuel Nwanosike
- Headquarters: Port Harcourt, Rivers State
- Ideology: Populism; Conservatism
- National affiliation: People's Democratic Party
- Senate (Riverian seats): 2 / 3
- House of Representatives (Riverian seats): 11 / 13
- House of Assembly: 28 / 32

The Rivers State Peoples Democratic Party, also referred to as Rivers PDP, is the state chapter of the Peoples Democratic Party in Rivers State, Nigeria. It is currently chaired by businessman and Philanthropist Felix Obuah. Prominent public figures including the late Nigerian senator Ibiapuye Martyns-Yellowe and former governor and Committee Chair on State Creation Peter Odili are products of Rivers PDP.

== Party history ==
Since the party's foundation in the late nineties, it has remained dominant for most of the state's political history winning several governorships as well as occupying majority of seats in both the House of Assembly and the National Assembly. Marshal Harry, a Kalabari High Chief was the first member in its fold to be appointed to the Chairperson rank. In the elections of 2007, the party emerged highly successful, and maintained itself in power and in the elections of 2011, it won a total of 16 seats and held control of all state offices including the governorship.

During November 2013, the Rivers State Peoples Democratic Party saw the defection of its member Chibuike Amaechi to the opposition APC. This was followed by the departure of two senators, Magnus Abe, representing Rivers South-East; and Wilson Ake, representing Rivers West in early 2014. The drawbacks, however, did not deter the party, who went on to retain its significant political strength in the 2015 elections.

== Current officeholders ==
At present, the party controls all 16 seats in the National Assembly.

=== Members of the Senate ===
Senator	Constituency
Osinakachukwu Ideozu	Rivers West
George Thompson Sekibo	Rivers East

=== House of Representatives ===
Representative	Constituency
Awaji Inombek Abiante	Andoni/Opobo/Nkoro
Kingsley Ogundu Chinda	Obio/Akpor
Jacobson Nbina	Oyigbo/Tai/Eleme
Blessing Ibiba Nsiegbe	Port Harcourt II
Jerome Amadi Eke	Etche/Omuma
Boma Goodhead	Asari-Toru/Akuku-Toru
Bright Gogo Tamuno	Okrika/Ogu–Bolo
Dumnamene Ransom Dekor	Khana/Gokana
Kenneth Anayo Chikere	Port Harcourt I
Prince (Hon.) Sir Uchechukwu George Nnam-Obi	Ahoada West/Ogba–Egbema–Ndoni
Betty Jocelyne Okagua Apiafi	Abua–Odual/Ahoada East
Boniface S. Emerengwa	Ikwerre/Emohua
Randolph Oruene Brown	Degema/Bonny

== Leadership ==
From 1999, the first chairman of the Rivers State Peoples Democratic Party was Marshal Sokari Harry, whose tenure lasted until his controversial exit three years later. He was immediately replaced by Prince Uche Secondus. In 2004, Godspower Ake took over national vice chairman (South South Zone) following the assassination of A.K. Dikibo. Ake was returned in 2008 as the state's party Chair only to be dismissed from office on 15 April 2013. The party's current chairman is Felix Amaechi Obuah. Other regular officers are the State Vice Chairman, three Regional Vice Chairmen, Secretary, Youth Leader and Treasurer.

=== Chairpersons ===
Below is a list of past and present Chairs of the Rivers PDP:

- Marshal Sokari Harry (1999–2002).
- Prince Uche Secondus (2002–08).
- Godspower Umejuru Ake (2008–13).
- Felix Amaechi Obuah (2013–present).
