= Rivers State House of Assembly =

Legislative arm of a state government in Nigeria

- 10th Rivers State House of Assembly
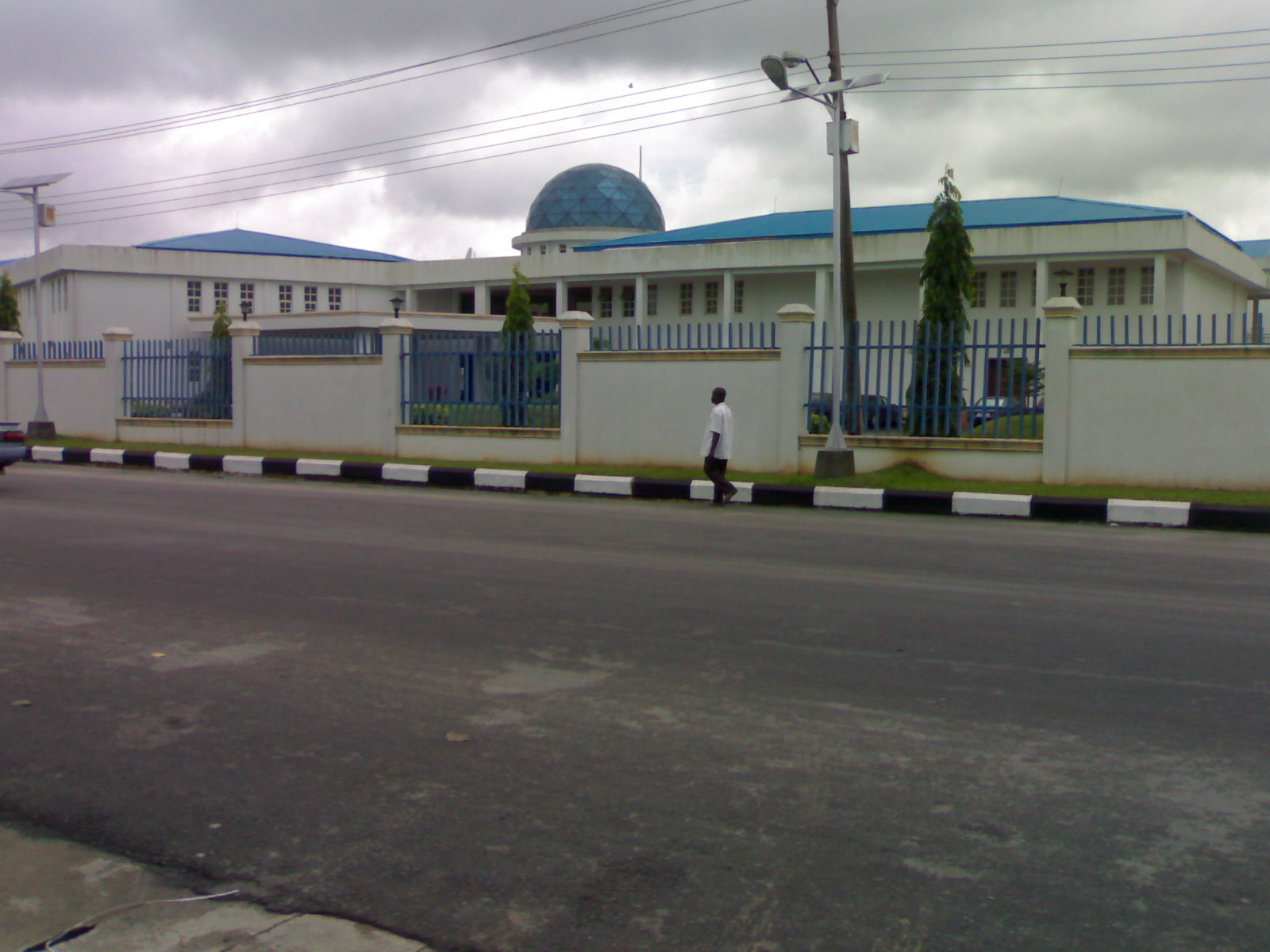

Type
- Type: unicameral
- Term limits: None

History
- New session started: 5 June 2023

Leadership
- Speaker of the Rivers State House of Assembly: Rt. Hon. Martin Chike Amaewhule, DSSRS (PDP)
- Deputy Speaker of the Rivers State House of Assembly: Rt. Hon. Dumle Maol, Esq. (PDP)
- Leader of the House: Hon. Major Jack (PDP)
- Deputy Leader: Hon. Linda Somiari Stewart (PDP)
- Chief Whip: Hon. Nwabochi Frankline Uchenna (PDP)
- Deputy Whip: Hon. Ofiks Kagbang Christopher (PDP)

Structure
- Seats: 32
- Length of term: 4 years

Elections
- Last election: 2023
- Next election: 2027

Meeting place
- Moscow Road, Old GRA, Port Harcourt; Rivers State

Website
- Rivers State House of Assembly

Rivers State House of Assembly is the legislative branch of the Government of Rivers State inaugurated in 1979. It is a unicameral body with 32 members elected into 32 state constituencies. The Assembly's primary function is to enact laws for the peace, order, and good governance of Rivers State, as outlined in the Constitution of Nigeria. The current Speaker of the State Assembly is Martins Amaewhule.

== Qualifications ==
=== The 10th Rivers State House of Assembly ===
The 10th Rivers State House of Assembly consists of 32 elected representatives from each constituency

Constituency	Representative
Abua–Odual	Hon. John Dominic Iderima (PDP)
Ahoada East I	Hon. Tony Williams Queen Uwuma (PDP)
Ahoada East II	(Vacant)
Ahoada West	(Vacant)
Akuku-Toru I	Hon. Major M. Jack (PDP)
Akuku-Toru II	Hon. Lolo Isaiah Opuende, Esq. (PDP)
Andoni	Hon. Ofiks Kagbang Christopher (PDP)
Asari-Toru I	Hon. Tekenari Granville Wellington (PDP)
Asari-Toru II	Hon. Enemi Alabo George (PDP)
Bonny	(Vacant)
Degema	Hon. Peter Enemeneya Abbey (PDP)
Eleme	Hon. Igwe Obey Aforji (PDP)
Emohua	Hon. Emeji Justina (PDP)
Etche I	Hon. Onwuka Ignatius Obenachi (PDP)
Etche II	Hon. Chimezie Christian Nwankwo (PDP)
Gokana	Rt. Hon. Dumle Maol, Esq. (PDP)
Ikwerre	Hon. Prince Lemchi Nyeche (PDP)
Khana I	Hon. Barile Nwakoh (PDP)
Khana II	Hon. Dinebari Loolo (Deceased)
Obio-Akpor I	Hon. Martin Chike Amaewhule, DSSRS (PDP)
Obio-Akpor II	Hon. Emilia Lucky Amadi (PDP)
Ogba–Egbema–Ndoni I	Hon. Nwabochi Frankline Uchenna (PDP)
Ogba–Egbema–Ndoni II	Hon. Nkemjika Ijeoma Ezekwe (PDP)
Ogu–Bolo	Hon. Davids Okobiriari Arnold (PDP)
Okrika	Hon. Linda Koroma Somiari-Stewart (PDP)
Omuma	Hon. Nwankwo Sylvanus Enyinna (PDP)
Opobo–Nkoro	(Vacant)
Oyigbo	Hon. Oforji Gerald (PDP)
Port Harcourt I	Hon. Solomon Wami (PDP)
Port Harcourt II	Hon. Tonye Smart Adoki (PDP)
Port Harcourt III	Hon. Azeru Opara (PDP)
Tai	Hon. Ngbar Bernard Baridamue (PDP)
Clerk of the House	Emeka Amadi, PhD

== Rivers State House of 9 10th Assembly members ==
- Solomon Sokolo. (Abua-Odual)
- Queen Williams. (Ahoada East)
- Ehie Ogerenye Edision. (Ahoada East)
- Sokari Goodboy Sokari. (Ahoada West)
- Major Jack (Akuku-Toru i)
- Lolo Opuende Isaiah (Akuku-Toru ii)
- Ikuinyi O. Ibani. (Andoni)
- Granville Wellington. (Asari-Toru I)
- Enemi Alabo George. (Asari-Toru ii)
- Abinye Blessing Pepple. (Bonny)
- Soberekon Anthony. (Degema)
- Igwe Aforji. (Eleme)
- John Wokoma. (Emohua)
- Opurum Nnanna. (Etche I)
- Tony Uchechukwu Ejiogu (Etche ii)
- Maol Dumle. (Gokana)
- Anselem Oguguo (Ikwerre)
- Denyah Bariene. (Khana I)
- Prince Ngbor. (Khana ii)
- Martin Amaewhule. (Obi/Akpor I)
- Michael Chinda. (Obi/Akpor ii)
- Uchenna Frankline. (Ogba/ Egbema/Ndoni 1)
- Nkemuika Nkemjika Ezekwe (Ogba/ Egbema/ Ndoni ii)
- Davids Anolds. (Ogu/Bolo)
- Linda Somiari Stewart. (Okrika)
- Kelechi Nwogu. (Omuma)
- Adonye Diri. (Opobo/Nkoro)
- Gerald Oforji. (Oyigbo)
- Wami Solomon Chile. (Port Harcourt I)
- Tonye Adoki. (Port harcourt Ii)
- Azeru Opara. (Port harcourt iii)
- Matthew Nenubari Dike. (Tai)

== Committees ==
- Public Accounts
- House Services
- Training & Information
- Finance
- Judiciary
- Local Government
- Works
- Women Affairs
- Commerce & Industry
- Agriculture
- Water resources
- Education
- Youth Employment & Empowerment
- Social Welfare & Rehabilitation/ Pilgrims Board SIEC Budget
- Commissions & Agencies
- Rules & Business Committee
- Public petitions
- Ethics & Privileges
- UBE
- Sustainable Development / Emergency Relief
- Transport
- Health
- Power
- Energy & Natural Resources
- Chieftaincy & Community Affairs
- Land, Housing & Urban Development
- Sports
- Environment
- Bills and Motions
- Employment
