= Unyeada Kingdom =

Ancient settlement in Nigeria

Unyeada
- Ancient Kingdom
- Location within Nigeria
- Coordinates: 4°31′51″N 7°26′40″E
- Country: Nigeria
- State: Rivers State
- LGA: Andoni

Area
  - Total: 146 km^{2} (56 sq mi)
- Elevation: 9 m (30 ft)

Population (1999)
  - Total: 80,561
  - Density: 552/km^{2} (1,430/sq mi)
- Time zone: UTC+1

The Unyeada Kingdom, sometimes referred to as "Ayanda" a corrupted version of Unyeada, some literal version interpreted it as (Unye Eda) "prowess of Edabiri". Unyeada is an ancient riverine settlement (Kingdom) located in western part of Obolo Land, administratively in Andoni Local Government Area of Rivers State, Nigeria. Situated in the south of Ogoni tribe and Kingdom of Bonny to the west and Eastern Obolo to the east. Unyeada territory stretches from Iburubu Sea near the mouth of Andoni River to Okwan Obbu or Imo River.

== Geography ==
The Kingdom of Unyeada is densely populated among Obolo (Andoni) cluster. In the Pre-colonial era, Unyeada Kingdom spanned from the east of Bonny Island to Ikot-Abasi and Eastern Obolo to the west and bounded by Ogoni people to the north and to the south is the Andoni Island. The natural boundaries of Unyeada Kingdom stretches from the Iburubu Sea (mouth of Andoni River) to the Imo River covering a total area of approximately 146 km^{2}.

The topography is generally a low lying mangroves swamp with occasional islands among the network of brackish creeks. This area potends an unusual ecotourism potential and enormous oil and gas reserves. Demographically, Unyeada people (as recorded in the 1963 Nigerian population census) had a population growth figure of 25,442. The number doesn't include the population of migrant fishermen.The projected figures for 1999 population census in Nigeria recorded a total of 80,651 for Unyeada Kingdom. Similarly, using Regression Analysis and the assumption of 2.5 percent annual growth rate, the population of Unyeada Kingdom was estimated at 93,053 by 2002.

Andoni after Nigerian Independence was divided into three Clans (Unyeada, Ngo and Okorotte) in the Eastern Region, Nigeria.

Unyeada Town is the traditional headquarters of Unyeada Kingdom. In the time past, Unyeada Town was the administrative headquarters of Unyeada Clan which comprises Asarama, Egendem and Dema communities. Presently, there are many communities that made up Unyeada Kingdom, prominent towns include, Isiodum, Egbomu, Dema, Ibot-irem, Samanga and Ajakajak. It's administratively divided into two namely: Unyeada District and Isi-Okwan District.

== History ==
=== Origin and Migration ===
Oral tradition in Unyeada suggests that the ancestors of Unyeada led by the progenitor Edabiri, a warrior migrated through the Old Benin Empire and Ijaw contraption from Egypt to settled in a place near the present Itsekiri and later to the Ayama (Nyamkpo) around 12th century BC. They are believed to be among the first settlers in the Eastern Delta, King Edabiri and his men discovered upper Andoni River and settled at a place called Ebon-Isebeke and later to Ebon-Akpon, (the site of Old Unyeada).

Another account claimed the migration took them along with other Obolo leaders, Ede, Asa, Alama, Efop, and Abah through to Urombi (Ramby) in the coastal contraption of the present Nigeria-Cameroon border, where they were faced with economic hardship as a result of war with the Bantu peoples before receding westward to Eastern Delta where they are today. The later is widely acceptable by major historical works on Obolo people. The Unyeada people speak Obolo language classified as Cross River language, the attrition of their original Ijaw language alluded to this fact.

=== Lineages in Unyeada Kingdom ===
These are four ancestral lineages that laid the foundation of Unyeada Kingdom, each were led by allies of King Edabiri of Old Unyeada.

- Egwe Eda (Forerunner of Ibirinya Otuo/Ogbolakon ), the royal lineage.
- Egwe Akpah (The precursor of Ibirinya Oyetile lineage)
- Egwe Ibok (Now called Ibirinya Otuibok)
- Egwe Osiki ( Later called Ibirinya Etekan)
- Egwe Ogbolodom Eyoka ( The precursor of Ibirinya Iyoba) This lineage was the latest arrival, available records show that they arrived at Unyeada in 1860

=== Old Unyeada (Ayanda) ===
The name Old Unyeada connotes power and wealth, it was the cradle of Obolo nation in the Pre-colonial Eastern Delta. Many antiques from the site of Old Unyeada (Ebon-Akpon) are similar to the Obolo sacred item collected from the alter of the Obolo National god called Yok-Obolo at Agwut-Obolo during the 1904 British Punitive Expedition Against Obolo people. Unyeada was a notable contemporary to Eastern Delta's city-states especially the Kingdom of Bonny.

Recorded evidence shows that Old Unyeada featured prominently in the Trans-Atlantic trade. Owing to its location on the estuaries of Andoni River and Imo River which access major hinterland markets hence Old Unyeada possess a significant controls to the hinterland market. Adadonye Fombo, in his historiography describes Unyeada as "the most prosperous" of Andoni settlements during the pre-colonial era. Thus, Old Unyeada was by its strategic location in the Trans-Atlantic trade route, potends an economic and historical relevance in Eastern Delta and Obolo (Andoni) leadership.

=== Reign of King Otuo Ogbolakon ===
According to Silas Eneyo in his work, "King Otuo Ogbalakon and the Leadership of Pre-colonial Obolo (Andoni)", King Otuo Ogbolakon of Unyeada was born at Old Unyeada in Egwe Eda (lineage of Eda) Eda in 1770. He was the Blue Blood to royalty of the Old Unyeada through his mother, Princess Ariaunwa, who, according to many writers, had inherited the rulership of Old Unyeada from her father, King Ikana Kpok probably as a regent. She married Prince Ogbolakon of Alabie (Agwut-Obolo) and begat Otuo.

=== King Edabiri Dynasty ===
- King Adaebi
- King Okwan
- King Inyajo
- King Okpok
- King Ikana
- Queen Ariauwan

The young King Otuo Ogbalakon inherited a well-organized monarchy and was trained in the mastery of warfare of Old Unyeada. The King or Okaan-Ama is the traditional head of all the heads Okaan-Ibirinya of lineages. Each of the lineages (Ibirinya) possesses a number of major War-canoe Houses (Egwe) which are manned by Okaan-Egwe. The Okaan-Egwes who more-or-less High Chiefs control fleet of family chiefs who take charge of the family units (Otoko).

Though, King Otuo Ogbolakon ascended the throne at a tender age but he was able to reorganized some traditional institutions and safeguards such as the Ofiokpo cult and Emen Ogbologbo in Old Unyeada.

He was faced with significant challenges. Internally, the regency of his mother Queen Ariaunwa was negatively affected by the ambitions of leaders of some of the political leaders of Old Unyeada. During the Interregnum the leaders of Ibirinya Otibok were already challenging the supremacy of the royal cult of Ofiokpo with their own cult of Agriba. Agriba, was a war deity of Bonny ancestry was said to have captured from the Ibani tribe by the Otibok War canoe during the reign of Ikana. Old Unyeada oral evidence proved that King Otuo Ogbalakon eventually tested his royal power of Eda Dynasty. Agriba was defeated and the political leadership of Otibok withdrawn their coup d'état.

Externally, the trend of event during the reign of King Otuo Ogbolakon coincided with the period of transition from Trans-Atlantic slaves trading to the trade in palm oil. The quest to control the trade in Africa by the European superpowers was the major factor that breeds competition and belligerent among different Kingdoms in the Eastern Niger Delta. The Kingdom of Bonny was at this time the commercial and political centre of the Niger Delta and maintained the lead in the new trade. The primary concern of King Otuo Ogbolakon appears to be the consolidation of Andoni participation in the trade. He presented an affordable trading access and established his presence in the Ogoni hinterland markets of Ewe Ekoro, Ewe Atat (Du Nyere) and Ewe Isen. He also traded with the Ndoki people.

=== Bonny-Andoni War (1839–1846) ===
Different writers on this economic war all agreed that it lasted for seven years, Silas Eneyo did extensively on the periods of interval between the writers " E. M. T. Epelle, an Opobo historian put the period at 1836 to 1846 while Dr. N. C Ejituwu places it between 1839 and 1846. Professor Kenneth Dike specifically refers to 1846 the date of famous" Bonny – Andoni War". The war was fueled by agitation to control the emerging palm-oil trade. It was recorded that Bonny middle men had refused the Andoni traders to carry out their transactions directly with the European marchants at Bonny port. In retaliation, King Otuo Ogbalakon led the famous trade blockage against the Bonny traders preventing them from accessing the hinterland markets through the Unyeada territory. This resulted in seven years of economic war in the Eastern Delta between the Kingdom of Bonny and Unyeada. According to E. N Ejituwu, the effect of the war was severe on British palm-oil trading interest in the Niger Delta. Most of the marchants at Liverpool who rely on the shipments from Bonny port recorded low business during the war.

=== New Unyeada ===
Due to the effect of the seven years war, King Otuo Ogbalakon relocated the Unyeada which was at that time the Seat of power of Obolo people. He moved across to Iborong-Akama Island and founded the New Unyeada in 1827. He introduced many martial strategies to protect the newly built town. The New Unyeada Town, the traditional seat of Unyeada Kingdom was fortified with seven rows of hard wood stockade capable of preventing cannon shot from the enemy war canoes. King Otuo Ogbolakon died in 1849 and his descendants who have ruled as King "Okaan – Ama", are as follows:

=== King Otuo Ogbolakon Dynasty ===
- King Ogbilikana Eyewa Otuo II
- King Otuile Otuo III
- King Uko Otuo IV
- King Ikwuruyok Otuo V
- King Ekon Otuo VI
- King Gwenden Otuo VII
- King Fredrick Otuo VIII
- King Israel Uzamaedeng Otuo IX

- The present Okaan-Ama, His Eminence, King (Dr.) I. U. Otuo IX JP Okaan-Ama and Paramount Ruler of ancient Unyeada Kingdom was crowned on 14 February 1977. He was gazetted as 2nd Class King and Paramount ruler of Unyeada Kingdom and a member of the Rivers State Traditional Rulers Council by the former Governor of Rivers State, His Excellency, Rt. Honourable Rotimi Amaechi.

== Language ==
Unyeada people speak Obolo language. Though lexicography of Unyeada Obolo slightly varies from that of the Ngo and Eastern Obolo but they are one language and easily understood or spoken by all.

- Obolo (Unyeada) numeric counting

Number from Zero to Ten

No.	English	Obolo Language
0.	Zero	Okpot
1.	One	Ge
2.	Two	Iba
3.	Three	Itita
4.	Four	Ining
5.	Five	Go
6.	Six	Gweregwen
7.	Seven	Jawa
8.	Eight	Jeta
9.	Nine	Anange
10.	Ten	Akop

In the pre-colonial era, the Unyeada (Obolo) people used the Nsibidi signs and symbols to communicate with one another.

== Unyeada fishing festival ==
=== Unyeada Fishing Festival (ijok-Irin) ===
Unyeada Fishing Festival – Ijok-Irin is an annual cultural fishing festival celebrated by the Obolo people of Unyeada Kingdom in Andoni Local Government Area of Rivers State which showcase the rich cultural heritage of the Obolo peopleple as the most creative and prosperous fishing communities in Niger Delta and Nigeria.

Ijok-Irin is literally interpreted as "fish feast", marks the end of traditional fishing season of the Obolo people between the months of July and August.

=== Historical background ===
The origin of the festival is traced to existence of the people. Obolo people occupied the longest stretch of the Niger Delta coastal area, they are predominantly fishermen and are widely spread across the Gulf of Guinea .

Unyeada people are mostly migrant fishermen who embark on fishing expedition to the length and breath of the African largest Delta; the Niger Delta, during each fishing season and must return home at the expiration of the season. It's traditionally required of every fishermen to bring with them their biggest catch to celebrate the festival. Before the advent of Christianity, It was regarded as a taboo in Obolo tradition for a fisherman to solely eat or sells his biggest catch.

Fisherman with the biggest catch in the Kingdom receives an award and blessing from the King (Okaan Ama) and elders of the land with a traditional the title of "Ogu-isi-mbom", (King of Fish). The royal blessing, is believed to attract bounty harvest in the next fishing season. Another important part of the festival is the sharing of a sacred feast called "Ogo" which is usually prepared by certain octogenarian women known as "Ugane-Ukuru-ekwet", the meal is madeup of local salad with smoked fish (preferably of Barracuda specie) which is served with locally refined gin among the chiefs and elders of each lineages (Ibirinya) of the Kingdom.

Obolo savory culinary culture is adjudged the best in Rivers State. Most delicacies here are essentially made from freshly caught organic Seafood (crab, prewinkcle, shrimp, cockle etc.) abound in the marine environment of Niger Delta. A Nigerian cuisine known as Native soup (Adaijong) originated from Andoni Local Government Area of Rivers State.

The festival which is week-long event culminated with the beating of the "Akama", a historic African war drum on every 5 July. The Akama traditional drum has now becomes the symbol of unity Unyeada Kingdom. It is believed that when the Akama is beaten, it's awaken spirit of ancestors of the ancient Kingdom.

In 1930, it was recorded by M. D. W Jeffreys, (Colonial administrator who later became an ethnographer) in his Intelligence report on the Andoni tribe, that the Andoni drum-lore (Akama) resonate the praise and remembrance of the 17th century BC Andoni King (Okan-Obolo), King Otuo Ogbalakon of Unyeada Kingdom. Saying as: "Otuo Ogbolakon, the great and famous warrior, when you get your enemy, hold him fast".

The "Ijimangi", is a spectacular procession of Unyeada warriors of different age group usually dressed in traditional george wrapper forming a colorful. parades showcasing the Cultural heritage of Unyeada Kingdom on the street of Unyeada Town, the ancestral Headquarters of the kingdom which usually attract admiration from visitors and tourists. This procession marked the end of the Ijok-Irin and signal the beginning of the new fishing season. Other activities which precede Ijimangi include; "Uji-edonti" (Canoe regatta) each from the five ancestral lineages (Ibirinya) or from a major War canoe house (Egwe) in Unyeada Kingdom. The regatta commences from Iburubu Sea and ends at "Okwan-Ebu" (Imo River), each of the about 72 settlements that madeup the kingdom will receive the regatta with two bottles of local gin.

The "Ogbo-njiin" is a choreographed fishing competition by net casting fishermen who cast their net not necessarily for the biggest catch but to showcase strength and mastery for skills in the fishing expedition. This part of the festival usually attract both local and foreign tourists and culture enthusiasts to Unyeada Kingdom.

Other events include a swimming competition, the "Miss Ijok-Irin Beauty Pageant" and an art exhibition.

Unyeada Fishing Festival in recent times, had been rebranded in line with the program of Rivers State Tourism Development Agency to promote cultural and ecotourism in Rivers State. In 2016, the festival was endorsed by the Government of Rivers State and was flagged off by Governor of Rivers State, Chief Barr Nyesom Wike CON, through the Commissioner, Rivers State Ministry of Agriculture Barr. Onimim Jacks.

== List of Towns and Villages in Unyeada Kingdom ==
- Unyeada Town
- Inyongnchicha
- Amaekpu
- Galilee
- Mmunama
- Ama-Paul
- Ama-Utono
- Polokiri
- Iboronakama
- Isiodum Town
- Ofunkrika
- Okwanjijor
- Otuokponuka
- Okolomudum
- Egbormung Town
- Olukama
- Ajarikiri
- Holy City
- Agbadam
- Ama-Gabriel
- Mbata
- Oru
- Ogboedim
- Orunaja
- Okukpo
- Otosot
- Otuokoloikolo
- Dema City
- Otuafa
- Otunria
- Ogbonte
- Ebon-Akpon
- Ibot-irem Town
- Isi-obiama
- Inyonoro
- Okuka
- Aso-Nlokibot
- Ama-mbop
- Samanga Town
- Ajakajak Town
- Afaradigi
- Udungama Iyo
- Okwan-york
- Nkanlek
- Mbaijon
- Nkaku
- Agbakoroma
- Otuafa

== Notable people ==
- Sam Sam Etetegwung, Politician and Former MP/Secretary, APC Rivers State
- King Otuo Ogbalakon, 17th Century Obolo (Andoni) King-Warrior, Unye-Obolo II
- Ezekiel Warigbani, Politician and Youth activist

== See also ==
- Obolo people
