= Andoni (disambiguation) =

Andoni may refer to:

== Nigeria ==
- Andoni, a local government area in Rivers State
- Andoni people, also known as the Doni or Obolo, an Ijaw Subgroup in the Niger Delta region
- Andoni language (or Obolo language), spoken by the Andoni people
- NNS Andoni (P-100), a seaward defense boat of the Nigerian Navy
- Andoni Island, a barrier island on the eastern fringe of the Niger Delta in Rivers State
  - Andoni Elephant Park, or Andoni Elephant Sanctuary, a community forest located on Andoni Island
- Andoni River (or Okwan Obolo), one of the many rivers in Rivers State

== People ==
- Andoni (name), the Basque adaptation of the given name Anthony in use in the Basque Country
- Andoni (last name), a Romanian-language surname (a variant of Andone) or found among Albanians
- Andoni, an Arabic name
  - Ghassan Andoni (born 1956), Palestinian activist
  - Joseph Andoni Massad (born 1963), Jordanian-American academic specializing in Middle Eastern studies

== See also ==
- Andonis
