= Ijok-Irin =

Cultural festival

Ijok-irin
- Nickname: Unyeada Fishing Festival
- Begins: 12 Century BC
- Location: Rivers State
- Country: Nigeria
- Major events: Fishing festival

Ijok-irin also known as Unyeada Fishing Festival is an annual cultural and fishing festival of the Obolo people. Ijok-irin means "Fish Fest", in Obolo languages is peculiar to Unyeada Kingdom in Andoni Local Government Area of Rivers State, Nigeria. The festival celebrated during the Summer period in Nigeria between the months of July and August to ushered in the new Fishing season of the Obolo people who are predominantly fishermen. The tradition of migrant fishermen returning home from fishing expedition cross the Gulf of Guinea with their biggest catch (usually smoke fishes) to observe the Ijok-irin is till visible with the Unyeada people.

== History ==
According to oral tradition of Unyeada people, the origin age-long Ijok-irin festival is traced to the very existence of the people. Obolo socio-cultural structure like other riverine environment was built around marine society. This has also influenced most of belief system and tradition. The festival originated about 12 Century BC.

Obolo people occupied the longest stretch of the Niger Delta coastal shoreline, invariably they are predominantly fishermen. They often migrate across the Gulf of Guinea on fishing expedition. Obolo fishermen are found in Togo, Cameroon, Equatorial Guinea and Gabon. Also, Oyorokoto in Andoni, is sometimes referred to as the "largest fishing settlement in the West Africa coast".

Before the advent of Christianity in the Niger Delta, it was regarded as a taboo in Obolo tradition for a fisherman to solely eat or sells his biggest catch. In fact, such could attracts a severe penalty and even led to the banishment of the erring fisherman and his family from the community. Catching of the biggest fish connotes dexterity, strength and bravery similar to hunting a big animal. It's attracts the Royal blessing and award from the King (Okaan-Ama) of Unyeada Kingdom, His Eminence, King (Dr.) Israel Uzamandeng JP, Otuo Ogbalakon IX.

== Features ==
In the pre-colonial era, there are many activities culminating the festival, usually Obolo annual calendar begins during this period of festival.
