= Obolo people =

Ethnic group in Niger Delta, Nigeria

The Obolo people, also known as the Andoni or Doni, is an Ijaw Subgroup in the Niger Delta region of Nigeria. Obolo people are primarily found in Rivers and Akwa Ibom State.

== History and origin ==
The documentation of the origin and the migration of the Obolo people is sparse and fragmented. The earliest data on Obolo migration is from around 12th century BC.

Obolo people (Andoni, Idoni or Indo) existed before the colonial era and commercial contacts with European traders. They interacted with the Bonny, Okrika, Kalabari, Nkoro, and Ibono people in what is now Ibeno, as well as with the Okoro-utip and Mkpanak people of Ibeno. In the past, the Obolo people frequently fought wars with the Kingdom of Bonny and the Ogoni people, though they generally maintain good relations with the latter.

=== 1904 British expedition ===
Christianity was already accepted in Obolo land long before 1699. When John Barbot visited Dony Town (Andoni) in 1699, he observed that the King of Dony Town accepted Christianity and priests were regularly sent from Sao Tome and Brazil to him to act as ministers. The king of Dony Town also spoke Portuguese. Nonetheless, the Yok-Obolo was still feared among neighboring tribes, who spread rumors of their ferocity in battle even to the British.

After destroying the House of Skulls and the Shrine of Yok-Obolo, the British split Andoni into six parts, each attached to one of the six Native Courts in the Niger Delta, hoping to destroy the Obolo politically. Some of the bronze arts and crafts collected by the British during this expedition are still on display in the British Museum.

== Language ==
The Obolo people speak the Obolo language.

== Traditions ==
The annual fishing festival Ijok-Irin, celebrated every 5th of July, is unique to the people of Unyeada Kingdom,

== Economy ==
Obolo territory, which spans from the Eastern Obolo territory in Akwa Ibom State to Bight of Bonny in Rivers State, has significant natural resources. Part of Nigeria's oil and gas revenue comes from the Obolo land.

== Notable people ==
- Anthony Nted Emmanuel, former president, Maritime Workers' Union of Nigeria
- Rufus Godwins, former solicitor general of Rivers State and the current head of Rivers State Civil Service
- Ikuinyi O. Ibani, former speaker, Rivers State House of Assembly
- Tele Ikuru, former Deputy Governor of Rivers State
- Matilda Lambert, Nigerian actress, filmmaker
- King Otuo Ogbalakon, 17th-century Obolo warrior-king/Okaan-Obolo II
- Ugbana Oyet, sergeant at arms, House of Commons of the United Kingdom
- Prince Uche Secondus, former national chairman, People's Democratic Party (PDP)
- Ezekiel Warigbani, youth advocate, former governorship candidate of APDA in 2019 Rivers State gubernatorial election
- Sam Sam Etetegwung, Former Member of Rivers State House of Assembly and current State Secretary, African Democratic Congress
- Ambassador Ugbanaawaji Ukatejit Samuel- Chairman- Andoni Progressive Union
