= List of islands of Nigeria =

Islands in Nigeria

There are parts of Nigeria closer to the water and provide for areas that have Islands. Places like Lagos, Rivers and other lower ends of the Niger-Delta with close access to rivers and oceans, allow for the natural or artificial formation of Islands. Some of the islands in Nigeria are included below:

- Abagbo Island
- Andoni Island
- Banana Island
- Bonny Island
- Brass Island
- Ebute-Oko Island
- Eko Atlantic
- Gberefu Island
- Ikoyi
- Nsutana
- Parrot Island
- Lagos Island
- Ogogoro island
- Snake Island
- Takwa bay island
- Tincan Island
- Victoria Island
- Eagle Island (Port Harcourt)

== Abagbo Island ==
Abagbo Island is the last island on the outskirt of Lagos. The island has been perturbed by its riverine area, which has caused less than stellar improvements in terms of modernisation and seemingly slow pace of development. The ex-governor of Lagos State, Bola Tinubu, took up a project to develop and modernize riverine areas like Abagbo.
