= Eagle Island (Port Harcourt) =

Island in Rivers State, Nigeria

- Location within Nigeria

Geography
- Location: Port Harcourt, Rivers State, Nigeria
- Coordinates: 4.7814°N 6.9803°E

Administration
- Nigeria
- State: Rivers State
- Local government area: Port Harcourt City

Eagle Island is an island and residential district within the metropolitan area of Port Harcourt, the capital of Rivers State, Nigeria. It forms part of the riverine landscape of the Niger Delta and is surrounded by creeks that connect it to other parts of the city.

== Geography ==
Eagle Island is situated in the low-lying coastal plain of the Niger Delta and is characterised by tidal creeks, wetlands, and reclaimed land. The island lies southwest of Port Harcourt's central business district and is accessible by road and waterways.

== History ==
Eagle Island was originally planned as a residential layout by the Rivers State Government in the late 1970s. The layout was reviewed in the early 1980s by the Office of the Surveyor-General of Rivers State to accommodate residential expansion in Port Harcourt.

== Development ==
Over time, the original master plan of Eagle Island has been altered by informal land acquisition and unregulated construction. Academic studies have identified significant changes in land use patterns, including increased residential density and encroachment on waterways.

== Administration ==
Eagle Island is administered under the Port Harcourt Local Government Area. Community development associations play a role in coordinating with state and municipal authorities on infrastructure, sanitation, and security matters.

== Transport ==
Transportation to and from Eagle Island is primarily by road, with waterways also serving as alternative transport routes. Boat transport is commonly used within surrounding creeks, particularly during periods of heavy traffic on major roads in Port Harcourt.

== Economy ==
Economic activity on Eagle Island is largely residential-based, supported by small-scale commerce, transport services, and real estate development linked to the wider Port Harcourt metropolitan economy.

== See also ==
- List of islands of Nigeria
- Snake Island (Lagos)
- Andoni Island
