= Andoni (name) =

Andoni is the Basque adaptation of the given name Anthony in use in the Basque Country.

Andoni may also be a Romanian-language surname (a variant of Andone) or found among Albanians. Andoni may also be an Arabic name in Jordan and Palestine.

It may refer to:

== Given name ==
=== Football players ===
- Andoni Cedrún (born 1960), Spanish retired footballer
- Andoni Elizondo (1932–1986), Spanish footballer and coach
- Andoni Goikoetxea (born 1956), Spanish international retired footballer
- Andoni Gorosabel (born 1996), Spanish footballer
- Andoni Iraola (born 1982), Liverpool F.C. football manager
- Andoni Imaz (born 1971), Spanish retired footballer
- Andoni Lakabeg (born 1969), Spanish retired footballer
- Andoni López (born 1996), Spanish footballer
- Andoni Murúa (born 1953), Spanish retired footballer
- Andoni Ugarte (born 1995), Spanish footballer
- Andoni Zubiaurre (born 1996), Spanish Indonesian footballer
- Andoni Zubizarreta (born 1961), Spanish international retired footballer

=== Bicycle racers ===
- Andoni Aranaga (born 1979), Spanish cyclist
- Andoni Ituarte (1919–2003), Venezuelan cyclist
- Andoni Lafuente (born 1985), Spanish cyclist

=== Others ===
- Andoni Calbano (born 2000), Spanish sprinter
- Andoni Canela (born 1969), Spanish photographer
- Andoni Gago, Spanish boxer
- Andoni Monforte (born 1946), Spanish politician and lawyer
- Andoni Ortuzar (born 1962), Spanish politician and journalist
- Andoni Vivanco-Guzmán (born 1990), Spanish tennis player

== Middle name ==
- Ion Andoni Goikoetxea (born 1965), Spanish international retired footballer
- Jon Andoni García (born 1983), Spanish footballer currently playing for Deportivo Alavés

== Last name ==
- Doris Andoni (born 1961), Albanian architect
- Fatjon Andoni (born 1991), Greek-born Albanian footballer
- Foto Andoni (born 1946), Albanian footballer
- Ghassan Andoni (born 1956), Palestinian academic
- Vasil Andoni (1901–1994), Albanian teacher and politician
- Vasil Andoni (born 2000), Bulgarian footballer

== See also ==
- Andonis Michaelides, known as Mick Karn
- Andonis
- Andony Hernández
