= Anthony Emmanuel Ntedeng =

Anthony Emmanuel Ntedeng (also known as Anthony Emmanuel Nted, born 1 October 1960) is a Nigerian unionist, industrialist and humanitarian. He was president of the Maritime Workers' Union of Nigeria in 2009. He was previously the vice president of the Nigeria Labour Congress. During his leadership of Maritime Workers' Union of Nigeria (MWUN), he was known for sanitizing the rot in the Nigerian maritime sector.

Comrade Emmanuel Tony Nted is a successful Businessman and he is regarded as one of the richest man in Rivers State. He hails from Agwut-Obolo Town in Andoni Local Government Area.

== Education ==
He had his primary and secondary education in Agwut-Obolo, Andoni LGA, Rivers State; obtained both his OND and HND in Business Administration from The Joint Professional Examination Board between 1993 and 1997. He proceeded to the University of Ado-Ekiti to further his education between 1999 and 2000 graduating with an MBA also in Business Administration.
