= Edwin Edeh =

Nigerian environmental health professional

Edwin Isotu Edeh is a Nigerian academic, writer, public health and environmental professional currently serving as the World Health Organization (WHO) Public Health and Environment (PHE) programme national consultant in Nigeria. He is the author of the book, Environmental Health: Understanding Current Issues and Solutions of the 21st Century adopted as a standard text in several African universities including Cavendish University, Kampala and Mount Kenya University. He is a two times winner of Nigeria Sustainability Health Consultant of the Year 2021 and 2022.

== Education and career ==
Edwin Edeh began his higher education at the Rivers State College of Health Science and Technology, Port Harcourt where he studied environmental health technology. He earned a master's degree in environmental management from University of Port Harcourt and a doctor of philosophy degree (PhD) in environmental management and control from the University of Nigeria. Edeh holds University of Manchester’s global health and humanitarianism certification and interprofessional health informatics from University of Minnesota. He is a professional member of the Nigerian Environmental Society (NES), a Fellow of African Institute of Public Health Professionals (AIPHP), EHORECON licensed Environmental Health Professional and an accredited management consultant of International Council of Management Consulting Institutes, Zurich.

Edeh started his career as a public environmental health officer in Oyorokoto, Andoni, Rivers State, one of the largest fishing settlements in West Africa. He taught at the Rivers State College of Health Science and Technology, Port Harcourt before leaving to join WHO as a public health and environment technical expert and national consultant for Nigeria. In 2018, he coordinated the 3rd cycle implementation of the United Nations Global Analysis and Assessment on Sanitation and Drinking Water (GLASS) Initiative across Nigeria, and led the 2020 WHO/UNICEF/WSSCC supported WASH TRACKFIN Initiative tracking investment and financial inflows sources into WASH Sector from Nigerian government, private sector and international non-governmental organisations. In May 2019, he coordinated the Nigeria Centre for Disease Control (NCDC), Federal Ministries of Environment and Power, Works and Housing, WHO and other partners 1st multisectoral National Environmental Health Response to Lassa Fever prevention and control in Nigeria.

== Publications ==
Edeh has published several works on public health and environment including a 426-page book: Environmental Health: Understanding Current Issues and Solutions of the 21st Century (2016) being used as a standard text in several African universities including Cavendish University Uganda and Mount Kenya University, Nairobi.
