= Otuo Ogbalakon =

Otuo Ogbolakon I, Okaan-Obolo II

Okaan-Ama of Unyeada Kingdom
- Reign: 1770–1849
- Coronation: 1790
- Predecessor: Queen Ariauwa Okpok Ogbolaikon
- Successor: Ogbilikana Eyewa II
- Born: Unyeada Kingdom
- Burial: Unyeada Kingdom
- House: Otuo
- Father: Ogbalakon
- Mother: Queen Ariauwa
- Religion: Yok Obolo (religion of Obolo people)

King Otuo Ogbalakon (Ogbolakon) or King Otuo was an eighteenth-century warrior-king of Obolo (Andoni) people in the Eastern Niger Delta. He was unpopular for fighting against Bonny and their colonial allies. Her mother, princess Ariaunwa Okpok-Ogbolikan of Old Unyeada was recorded by history as the first Obolo (Andoni) princess to rule as a monarch (Okaan-Ama) after the death of her father, King Ikana Okpok of the Edabiri dynasty in the eighteenth century. Princess Ariaunwa married Prince Ogbolaikon of Alabie (now Agwut-Obolo) and begat Otuo. In 1792, when Otuo became of age he was crowned as the King of Old Unyeada Kingdom.

At the fall of Old Unyeada, King Otuo founded the new Unyeada Kingdom in 1827 and relocated the seat of power of the Andoni people from Old Unyeada (Ebon-Akpon). This was as a result of the prolonged war with the Kingdom of Bonny over control of the hinterland market. Many European explorers who visited the Unyeada, described the kingdom as the most progressive settlement and seat of influence of the Obolo people. King Otuo Ogbolakon ruled over 200 settlements of Obolo Land as a warrior-king. History recorded him as the fiercest warrior-king in the Eastern Niger Delta for standing against of British divide and rule system. The legendary seven-year war between Andoni and the Kingdom of Bonny was severe on the palm oil exports in Liverpool.

== Andoni-Bonny Treaty 1846 ==
According to Ejituwu, an earlier historiographer. "The purported treaty between Bonny and Andoni (Unyeada) of 1846 was unfounded in Unyeada oral tradition". Unyeada tradition accepts the defeat of the Old Unyeada in 1826 but emphasizes that at no time was any treaty made with Bonny in 1826. King Otuo Ogbolakon fought and defeated Bonny in 1846. The impact of King Otuo Ogbolakon's war on Bonny in the Eastern Delta.

The entry of King Jaja of Opobo into Unyeada (Obolo) territory in 1869 following the Bonny Civil War, would have infringed on the terms of such the ambiguous treaty; it was said that the Andoni shall fought the enemies of Bonny. In light of the above, many writers including William Balfour Baikie concluded that the purported treaty was not only an illusion but a diplomatic curiosity on the part of King of Bonny to asway his colonial allies.
