= Agwut-Obolo =

Coordinates: 4.473°N 7.364°E

Agwut-Obolo Town (Alabie) is literally interpreted in Obolo language as (the Sanctuary of Obolo people). Also, the tribal seat of the Obolo people. Located in Andoni Local Government Area of Rivers State, Nigeria. Agwut-Obolo is an ancient religious centre in the pre-colonial Eastern Niger Delta where the deity of "Yok-OBolo", the National god of the Obolo Nation is situated. Following the exit King Jaja of Opobo and his group from the Kingdom of Bonny in 1869 seeking refuge in Obolo (Andoni) Land, Jaja entered a traditional oath of allegiance to venerate the deity of " Yok-Obolo" at Agwut-Obolo or Alabie as condition of his acceptance into the Obolo territory.

In 1904, the British carried out Punitive expedition against Obolo people led by Captain A. A Whitehouse and Yok-Obolo shrine, also known as "House of Skull" was raided and destroyed at Agwut-Obolo. Many Obolo antiquities and objects were removed here and are now on display in the British Museum and museums in Europe and America.
