= Oyorokoto =

Fishing village in Rivers State, Nigeria

- Tourists Destination in Rivers State
- Location within Nigeria
- Coordinates: 4°31′51″N 7°26′40″E
- Country: Nigeria
- State: Rivers State
- LGA: Andoni
- Elevation: 5 m (16 ft)

Oyorokoto is a fishing settlement located on Andoni Island in Andoni Local Government Area of Rivers State, Nigeria, and is often referred to as the largest fishing settlement in West Africa sub region. Oyorokoto is an emerging tourists destination in Rivers State, and home to many endangered species. Different species of sea turtle and dolphin are often by-caught by fishermen here. A large dolphin which attracted the attention of both local and international conservation groups was caught by a fisherman at Oyorokoto in the year 2020.

== Tourists attraction ==
The Nigerian Conservation Foundation in collaboration with an indigenous non-governmental organization, Save Andoni Forest Elephants Initiative (Safe-i), have started the process of sensitization and awareness campaign among fishermen in Oyorokoto to preserve endangered marine species in Andoni Local Government Area. Oyorokoto also part of the proposed Andoni Elephant Park and Marine national park

== Oyorokoto Atlantic beach ==
Oyorokoto features one of the longest sand beaches in Nigeria suitable for holiday makers and eco-tourism. The ongoing Ngo-Oyorokoto Atlantic road initiated by Governor of Rivers State, H.E Siminalayi Fubara will open up the Andoni for Blue economy
