= Ataba, Rivers State =

Ataba
- Town
- Interactive map of Ataba
- Country: Nigeria
- Geopolitical zone: South South
- State: Rivers State
- Local Government Area: Andoni

Ataba is a coastal town in Andoni, Rivers State, Nigeria. The town is known for its abundant coconut and palm kernel shells. And also fresh fish, is at the western end of Andoni. Over several centuries, Ataba has been a receptacle of multiple migrations.

== Structure ==
On the mainland, the town is divided into nine quarters: Egweisiyork (the royal seat/quarter), Egweite, Egweogogor, Egwebe, Egweaba, Egweituk, Egweosot, Egweaja, and Egwenkan.

Ataba has two political wards and a dominant presence in the politics of Andoni. It is the headquarters of Andoni West Archdeaconry of the Church of Nigeria, Anglican Communion.

== Geography ==
Ataba has swampy creeks with abundant seafood. It is bordered by Bonny LGA to the southwest, Ogu-Bolo LGA to the northwest, Gokana and Khana LGAs on the north, other Andoni communities in the east and the Atlantic Ocean on the south.

== Transport ==
The ongoing multi-billion Naira Bodo-Ataba-Bonny road is funded by the NLNG and the Federal Government of Nigeria. It is expected to open Ataba and Bonny LGA to development.
