= Looking for the Wild =

Looking for the Wild (Spanish: El viaje de Unai) is a 2016 documentary film directed by nature photographer Andoni Canela.

== Premise ==
Unai, the photographer's son, tells the 15-month journey around the world that Andoni Canela did with his entire family in search of seven threatened animals on all continents. More than a year living with African elephants, American bisons, great hornbills, gentoo penguins, saltwater crocodiles, Iberian wolves and cougars in their natural habitat is a call for contemplation and also for the conservation of these creatures in the wild. Canela chose animals that have traditionally maintained a tense relationship with humans, in some cases being on the verge of extinction, and living in a habitat of high ecological value (the Namib desert, North American prairies, jungles Southeast Asia, Antarctica, mangroves and tropical forests of northern Australia, the Cantabrian Mountains and the steppes of Patagonia) to communicate a conservation message.

The fact that the narrative voice of the documentary falls on a 10-year-old boy gives a different point of view to the documentary, making it a suitable piece for all audiences and of an educational value recognized by the critics.

The film was presented in three versions: Spanish, Catalan and English, all narrated by Unai.

== Release ==
Looking for the Wild was premiered on September 1, 2016 at the Cineteca Matadero in Madrid. On September 14, 2016, the Catalan version was released at the Cine Phenomena in Barcelona. Subsequently, it was exhibited in the cinemas of several Spanish cities (Sevilla, October 8, Valencia October 15, Oviedo November 9, Tudela November 10, Pamplona, November 11, Mahón, Ciutadella November 12, Bilbao, San Sebastián and Vitoria November 15).

It was broadcast for the first time on television on October 11, 2016, in the program Sense Ficció de TV3, Televisión de Catalunya, October 15.

In November 2016, the film was selected as a candidate for the Goya Awards and the Gaudi Awards.

== Reception ==
The press has highlighted the conservationist and educational message of Looking for the Wild. In that sense, it has been said that: "Unai's voice invites to sensibility, Meritxell's words prove that the wild world is not at odds with the security of a family and the impeccable photograph of Andoni paints a pristine and natural canvas. But the message is blunt: "We are in the midst of extinction. (...) And although Andoni was not the first to witness the debacle and denounce it, perhaps Unai can remove the consciences of stone. (...). Because there is nothing more honest and incorruptible than the look of a child on the world that are annihilating adults." Mónica Zas Marcos in eldiario.es (03/09/16).

== Festivals and awards ==
- Docsbarcelona International Documentary Film Festival. Spain, Barcelona, 2018. Docs and Teens Award.
- EYF-Environmental Youth Forum (Doclands, Documentary Film Festival). United States, San Rafael, California, 2018. Official selection.
- Nature Track Film Festival. United States, Los Olivos, California, 2018. Best Film Award and ‘Connecting with Nature’ Award.,
- FICMA. Spain, Barcelona, 2017. Sol de Oro Petit FICMA Award.
- Festiver. Colombia, Barichara, 2017. Official selection.
- Camina. Uruguay, Montevideo, 2017. Official selection
- FIC-CAT. Spain, 2017. Audience Award.
- FICMEC. Spain, 2017. Brote Award.
- Certamen De Cine De Viajes Del Ocejón. Spain, 2017. Audience Award.
