= Rivers State College of Health Science and Technology =

Public higher education institution

Rivers State College of Health Science and Management Technology
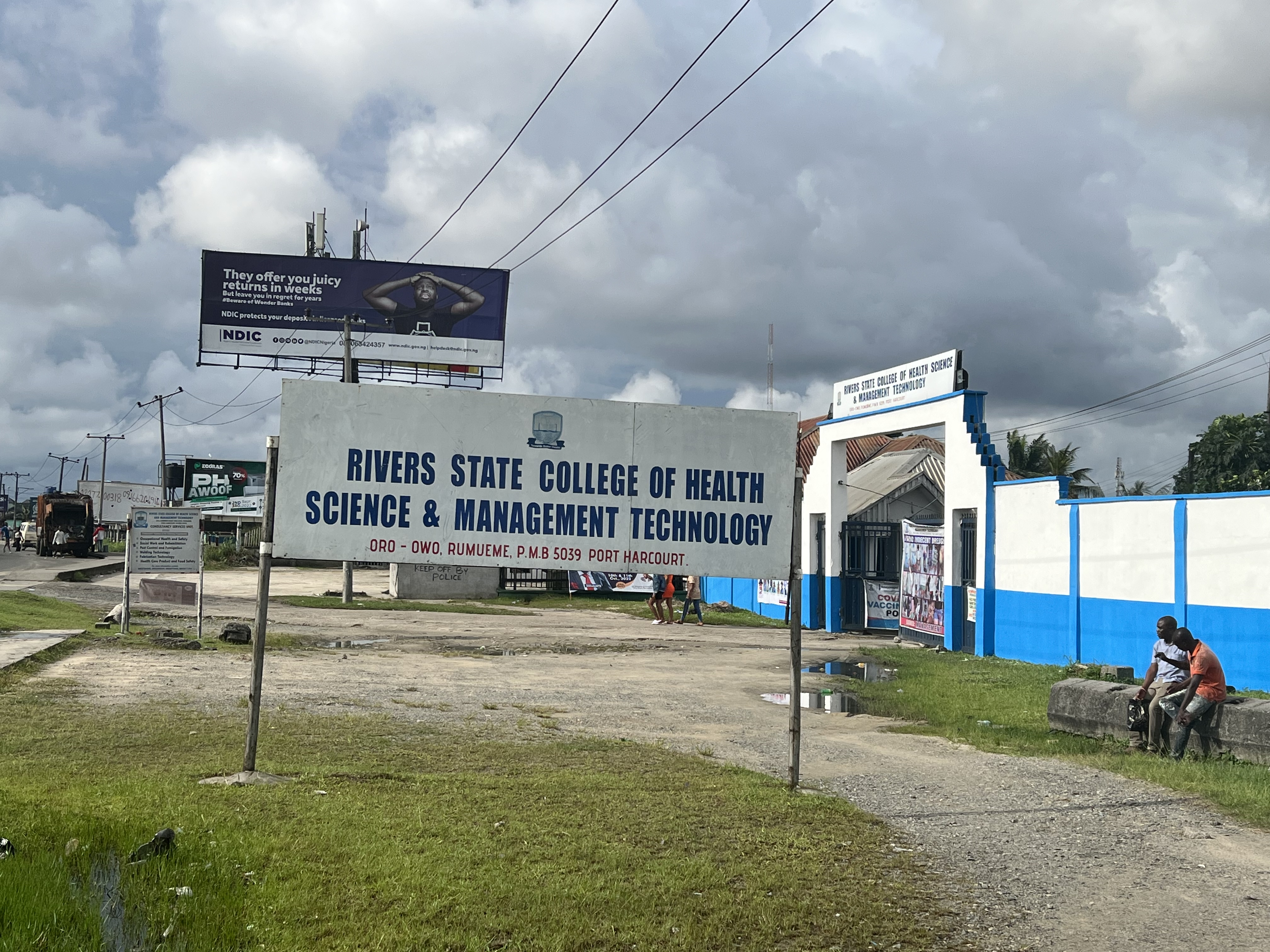
- Other names: RIVCOHSMAT
- Motto: The cradle of Health Technologists, Health Scientists and Health Technicians
- Type: Public
- Established: 2001; 25 years ago
- Academic affiliations: University of Education, Rivers State, University of Science and Technology
- Provost: Franklin Nlerum
- Location: Port Harcourt, Rivers State, Nigeria; 4°49′10″N 6°59′18″E
- Website: www.rschst.edu.ng

Rivers State College of Health Science and Management Technology (RIVCOHSMAT) is a public higher education institution in Port Harcourt, Rivers State, Nigeria. It was established under the College of Health Science and Technology Act (2001). It consists of School of Health Technology, School of Public Health Nursing, School of Nursing and School of Midwifery.

== Admission requirements ==
RSCHST is open to all regardless of gender and national origin. There's a minimum entry age of 16 years. Candidates for the college's certificate programs are required to pass the entrance exam. Diploma programs usually require JAMB score. If admitted to any, candidates may be called to submit themselves for interview or further examinations where applicable.

== Programs ==
The following programs are offered in the college

- Anesthetic Technician Programm (Certificate): 2 years
- Biomedical Engineering Technology Programme (National Diploma): 2 years
- Community Health Extension Workers Programme (Diploma): 3 years
- Dental Surgery Technician/Dental Health Technician Programme (Diploma): 3 years
- Dispensing Opticianry Technician Programme (Diploma): 3 years
- Emergency Medical technician (Diploma): 3 years
- Environmental Health Technicians (Diploma): 3 years
- Environmental Health Technology (Higher National Diploma): 4 years
- Health Information Management (Abridgement): 1 year
- Health Information Management (Professional Diploma): 3 years
- Health Promotion and Education (Diploma): 2 years
- Hospital/Health Administration (Diploma): 2 years
- Junior Community Health Extension Workers Programme (Certificate): 2 years
- Medical Laboratory Technician Programme (Abridgment): 2 years
- Medical Laboratory Technician Programme (Certificate): 3 years
- Medical Social Work (Diploma): 3 years
- Pharmacy Technician Programme (Diploma): 3 years
- Public Health (Diploma): 2 years
- Public Health Nursing (HND): 2 years
- Public Health Nursing Abridgement (Refresher) programme (HND): 1 year

== Notable alumni ==
- Edwin Edeh (WHO) Public Health and Environment (PHE) programme national consultant in Nigeria

== See also ==
- Rivers State College of Arts and Science
- Rivers State Polytechnic
- Rivers State University of Education
- Bauchi State College of Nursing and Midwifery
