= Asarama =

City in Nigeria

- City
- Location within Nigeria
- Coordinates: 4°31′42″N 7°26′35″E
- Country: Nigeria
- State: Rivers State
- LGA: Andoni
- Elevation: 9 m (30 ft)

Asarama is a riverine city in Andoni, Rivers State, Nigeria. It borders Bori to the north, Nkoro to the east, Ngo to the south, and Bonny and the Kalabari Kingdom to the west.

== City ==
Asarama is a city located in Rivers State, southern Nigeria. It is one of the largest and most populated cities in the Andoni Local Government Area.

Asarama was formed from an amalgamation of many villages, including Egwebe (the largest and most populated), Egwe-Aja, Egwe-Ewaye (from which Asuk Royal House emanates), Egwe-Idake, Egwe-Esu, Egwe-Asuk-Okpong, and Ikpak. Other villages include Iyong-Orong, Asarama-Ija, Iwoma-Asarama, Asalakiri, Agbaokwan-Asarama 1 to 15, Uja-Ama, and Asarama-Toru. The Egwebe village square is in the heart of Asalakiri. However, since these villages have over a thousand years of ongoing mutual relationships, they cannot be differentiated. Asuk Royal House in Egwe-Ewaya (Ewaye, for short) is the only House that produces the King. Others do contribute when it comes to religious, socio-cultural, and war activities.

== History ==
The Andoni resides in present-day Rivers and Awka-Ibom States. Based on the evidence from traditional history, the Andoni are descended from Ayama, the Son of Tara (Tarakiri), who was left with Kala-Okun at Igbedi creek. The migrating ancestors are mentioned as Asara or Asa founder of Asarama, Ifop, Edeh or Edabiri, Alama, and Abah, to name a few. They left Igbedi creek area at an early stage, taking with them the title \"Indo Oru\" which they remembered and gave to their priest rulers. The title \"Indo Oru\" was subsequently corrupted to \"Ando Oru\," and then during their sojourn, this term was altered to \"Andoni Oru\."

Leaving the central delta, the early ancestors made their way through creeks and swamps, cutting down trees to cross the water waves. They first encamped for some time in the southeastern region before moving into the delta. Their first settlement was called Ayama, after their ancestor. The site of Ayama was the site of Peterside in Ibani or Bonny town. They stayed here for centuries manufacturing salt for the interior markets before moving. It was from Ayama that Asarama (i.e., Asara\'s town) was founded.

A second group moved on to the southern Cameroons and Calabar region. It was here that they intermarried with Bantu-speaking people. In approximately the 12th century AD, these Andoni made a return journey into the Niger Delta and settled at Egwede, where they sited their national emblem, called Oyobolo (Obolo). Further migration patterns were caused by the repeating conflicts with the Ibani (Beni or Bonny to Europeans), as a result of the slave-raiding confusion of those times. From the site of Peterside, they moved eastwards to the Rio Real, then to Asarama-Toru, then further east to Okoma, the site opposite the present town.

The old settlement was the site of Peterside in Bonny, which was called Ayama (or old Asarama), Asarama being the oldest of the Andoni towns. Other Andoni towns include Ayangala, while Alabie was the other name for Egwede. In the 1940s, the chief title of the Andoni native court judge was still Andoni Oru, acknowledging the ancestral connection to Indo-Oru (the original title of father Ujo the ancestor of Ijo people). The Andoni no longer speak the original Ijo language. The foundation of Andoni was between the 10th and 12th century AD.

== Social life ==
The majority of Asarama people are highly social and religious. They are predominantly traditional [more info here] worshipers as well as Christians. Approximately 40 years ago [from what date?], many fetish and cultural play/events were introduced to Asarama society, though currently, the only fetish-related, dangerous and frightening play is the Efie-okpo, which is played at night between the hours of 9pm and 4am in September every year. Two others in this tradition are called Nwantam and Okekpe. Though the Okekpe is a little more terrifying, strangers can join in the performance with indigenous players; and the Nwantam is open to general participation. Most Christians believe that these activities are for the indigenous deities and should not be performed at all. The Ofio-okpo [check spelling - 3 versions] is never and can never be seen with eyes unless you are a member of this social group; thus it is seen as an occult and devilish organization. According to the members, those who set eyes on it will die if they are not members, but people find pleasure in listening to the songs and instrumental beats coming from the masquerade.

The youths felt that these plays were too traditional for them, and therefore introduced aspects of western culture to the town. The arrangement of the events now include: Nwantam (1 January), Beach Party (2 January), Okekpe (3 January) and Ofiokpo (three days in September). Aside from these, there are other events which happen within the year at least every three months, as the Asarama people return home with friends from all walks of life bringing new ideas for partying, clubbing, marriages and wedding ceremonies, chieftaincy installations, burial ceremonies and other cultural activities. These activities sometimes blend with the quarterly events which the Asarama people called Otayan (ending of moon or months). The first Otayan is from the last week of March to the first week of April; the second quarter is the last week of June to the first week of July; the third quarter is the last week of September to the first week of October; and the final quarter goes from the last week of December to as long as anyone can survive the revelry in January, which then coincides with the New Year celebrations. The Asarama people rarely celebrate Christmas at home, though they will observe the season with friends who visit them or if they visit friends outside Asarama.

== Geography ==
Asarama lies at a latitude of 4.5323100 and longitude of 7.4408400. It has an elevation of 9 meters above sea level. It borders Egendem to the west and Opobo to the east, Ogoni to its north, and Ebuguma to its south. It is a few miles away from the Atlantic Ocean.

Asarama has 7 different vilagies which are Egwebe (largest and populated), Egwe-Ewaye(Royal village), Egwe-Aja, Egwe-Esu, Egwe-Idake, Asuk and Ikpak. Within these communities exists other smaller towns like Iyong Orong, Asarama Ija, Iwoma-Asarama, Asalakiri and Agbokwan-Asarama. These villages in Asarama can not be differentiated due to the mutual cooperation and relationship which has existed for hundreds of decades ago.
