= Okoroete =

Headquarters of Eastern Obolo, Nigeria

- Town
- Location within Nigeria
- Country: Nigeria
- State: Akwa Ibom
- LGA: Eastern Obolo

Government
  - Type: Local Government Headquarters
- Time zone: UTC+1 (WAT)
- Postal code: 534206
- Vehicle registration: KRT
- Climate: Am

Okoroete (or Ọkọrọete in the native Obolo language) is a town in Akwa Ibom State of Nigeria. It is the headquarters of Eastern Obolo LGA. It became the headquarters on creation of the LGA by the Federal Government of Nigeria on 4 December 1996. It is traditionally governed by the Ede Royal dynasty, as Okaan Ama, founder and natural Ruler. Okaan Ama Munye Stephen Aqua Ede vii is the current and certified Village head or Okaan Ama. He is assisted in administration by the Okoroete Village Council, headed by Pastor Emmanuel Adasigwungs II.
