= Eastern Obolo =

Eastern Obolo Obolo agan̄ Mbum-ura
- LGA
- Interactive map of Eastern Obolo
- Location in Nigeria
- Country: Nigeria
- State: Akwa Ibom State
- Capital: Okoroete
- Established: 1996

Government
  - Type: Local Government
  - Chairman: Rt. Hon Samuel Nteogwuijah

Area
  - Total: 156.5 km^{2} (60.4 sq mi)
- Elevation: 151.91 m (498.4 ft)

Population (2022)
  - Total: 76,500
  - Density: 489/km^{2} (1,270/sq mi)
- Time zone: UTC+1 (WAT)

Eastern Obolo (or Obolo agan̄ Mbum-ura in the native Obolo language) Audio is a Local Government Area (LGA) in southern Nigeria, with its headquarters at Okoroete. It is a coastal local government area in Akwa-Ibom State under great tidal influence from the Bight of Bonny. Eastern Obolo LGA was mapped out of Ikot Abasi LGA by the Federal Government of Nigeria on 4 December 1996 with over 30,000 residents across a total area of approximately 17,000 km^{2}. It comprises 16 villages, divided into two clans, namely Okoroete and Iko. It has ten political wards, of the Obolo ethnic group.

== Climate ==
The climate at Obolo, which has an elevation of 151.91 m (498.4 ft) above sea level, is classified as tropical wet and dry or savanna (Aw). The district's average annual temperature is -0.81% lower than Nigeria's averages at 28.65 °C (83.57 °F). Obolo generally experiences 195.31 wet days (53.51% of the time) annually with average precipitation of 160.69 millimetres (6.33 inches).

== Location ==
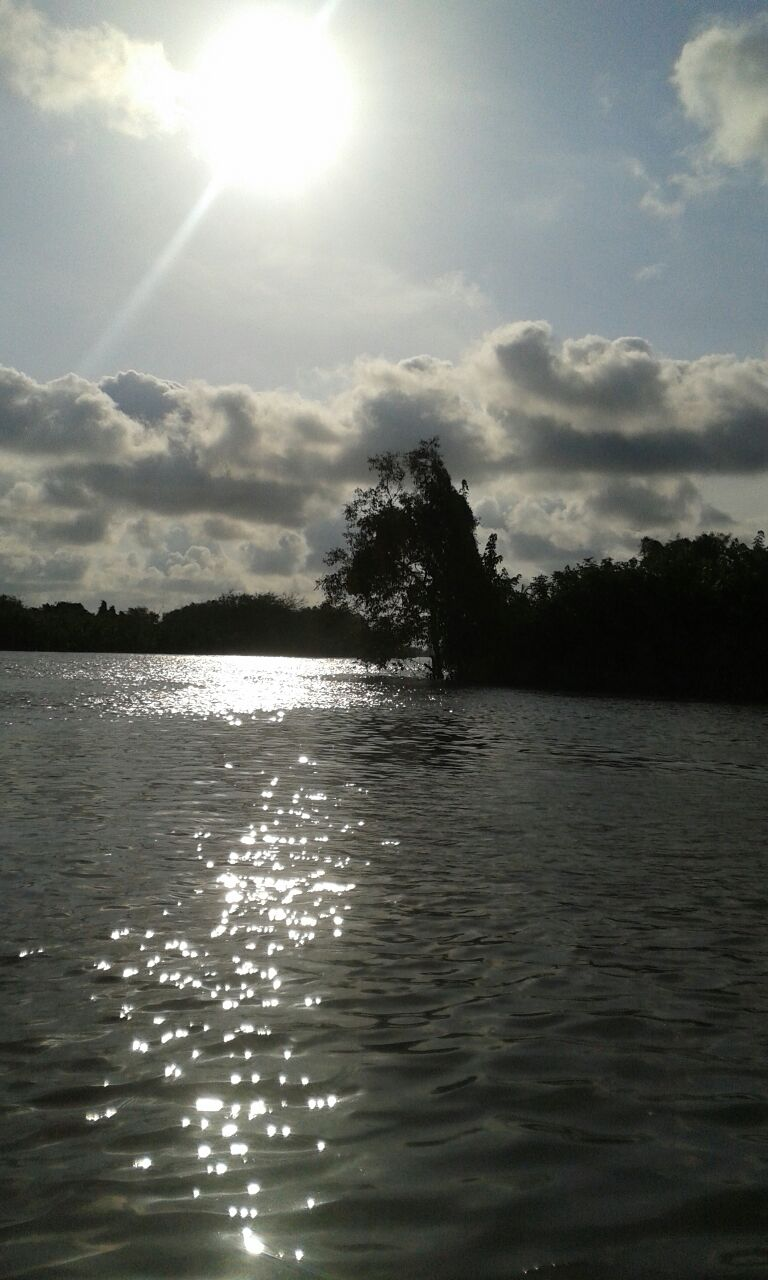
A view of the Obolo River, Eastern Obolo, Nigeria

Eastern Obolo is located in the Akwa ibom fringe between Imo and Qua Iboe Rivers estuaries and lies between latitudes 4° 28' and 4° 53' and longitudes 7° 50' and 7° 55' East. It is bounded to the north by Mkpat Enin Local Government Area, northeast by Onna, west by Ikot Abasi, southeast by Ibeno Local Government Area and in the south by the Atlantic Ocean.

== Culture ==
The Obolo have their distinct language and cultures that are unique to Obolo people in the states where they are indigenous to. Wherever the Obolo are found they have the same unique language that unites them.

== Natural resources ==
Eastern Obolo has abundant mineral deposits with onshore and offshore oil wells at Elek-Okpoon̄, Iko, Otunene, Emeroke, Ikonta and Obianga. There is a fishing settlements at Educwink, Elek-Okpoon̄, Agan-asa. Forest reserves include mangrove, iroko, raffia, rubber, kolanut, coconut, peas, and mango.

== Commerce ==
The people of Eastern Obolo are predominantly fishermen, with over 65 per cent involved in active fishing.

== People ==
The people are a combination of Obolo ethnic group and Iko extractions; strong cultural affinity exists among the people. It has a total landmass of 117,008 square kilometres (45,177 mi^{2}) with an estimated shoreline about 184 km long. Obolo language is the major language of the people as the different communities speak different dialects of Obolo, which are mutually intelligible. The Iko dialect spoken in Iko clan and is intelligible to a large number of people in Eastern Obolo. Iko dialect is closely related to Obolo and to the Okoroutip dialect spoken in Ibeno LGA, the sister/twin LGA of Eastern Obolo.

== Population ==
The community population is predominantly the Obolos (80%) and Ibibio (10%), Igbo (10%) which makes up the remaining population. Emigration activities in the community is as a result of low productivity due to poor fish catch, limited farmlands, and the high rate of unemployment.

== Political Wards ==
Wards	Ward Centers
Eastern Obolo 1	Primary School, Okoroete
Eastern Obolo 2	Primary School, Okoro Mbokho
Eastern Obolo 3	Primary School, Amadaka
Eastern Obolo 4	Town Hall, Elekpon
Eastern Obolo 5	Primary School, Emereoke
Eastern Obolo 6	Town Hall, Amauka
Eastern Obolo 7	Primary School, Okoroinyong
Eastern Obolo 8	Primary School, Iko Town
Eastern Obolo 9	Primary School, Kamkpa
Eastern Obolo 10	Village Square, Atabrikang
