= Maritime Workers' Union of Nigeria =

The Maritime Workers' Union of Nigeria (MWUN) is a trade union representing sailors, dockworkers and those in related trades in Nigeria.

== History ==
The union was founded in 1996, when the Government of Nigeria merged four unions:

- Dockworkers' Union of Nigeria
- Nigerian Port Authority Workers' Union
- Nigeria Union of Seamen and Water Transport Workers
- Union of Shipping, Clearing and Forwarding Agencies Workers of Nigeria

Like all its predecessors, the union affiliated to the Nigeria Labour Congress, and by 2002, it had 83,479 members.

== Presidents ==
1996: Uzojie Ukamuna
2001: Onikolease Irabor
2009: Anthony Nted Emmanuel
2017: Prince Adewale Adeyanju
2025: Francis Bunu
