= Andone =

Andone is a surname. Notable people with the surname include:

- Bogdan Andone (born 1975), Romanian footballer and coach
- Florin Andone (born 1993), Romanian footballer
- Ioan Andone (born 1960), Romanian footballer and coach
- Ludmila Andone (born 1989), Moldovan footballer

== See also ==
- Andon (name)
