= Doris Andoni =

Albanian architect

- Education: Bachelor of Architecture and Urban Planning, University of Tirana, 1985 Master of Science in Urban Housing Management, Lund University, 2000
- Occupations: Director, Ministry of Finance and Economy

Doris Andoni (1961) is an Albanian architect and housing policy expert. Her expertise focuses on creating, analyzing and executing housing policies, engaging in strategic planning, conducting training and capacity building, and managing initiatives. In 2018, she was recognized for her contributions to the fields of architecture, housing policy, and legislation in Albania with the Albanian Architecture Prize. She serves as a Director in the Ministry of Finance and Economy.

She has held roles as an architect, a housing expert on both national and international projects, and as a public administration manager at many levels. Doris Andoni is a lecturer on subjects encompassing housing policy, informal housing, and urban regeneration. Her housing research encompasses topics such as affordable housing, social housing, and informal settlements.

== Education ==
Andoni was born in Tirana in 1961 and studied architecture and urban planning at the University of Tirana, graduating in 1985. She also completed a Master of Science in Urban Housing Management at Lund University in 2000. Between 1985 - 1993, she worked as an architect at the Institute of Studies and Projects in Tirana, where she was in the design of approximately 10 socio-cultural projects. Throughout the 1990s and 2000s, she undertook various postgraduate specializations focusing on urban planning, housing policies, and project management from institutions such as the Sapienza University of Rome and the Institute for Housing and Urban Development Studies (IHS) at Rotterdam, Netherlands.

== Policy work ==
=== Ministry of Public Works and Transport of Albania ===
From 2001 to 2012 Andoni was the Director of Housing Policy Department in the Ministry of Public Works and Transport of Albania where she led and implemented housing policy reform in the 2000s. In 2001 she initiated the housing policy reform that was completed in 2004 with the new legislation introducing social housing in Albania for the first time. Her policy efforts focused on affordable and energy-efficient housing projects for low-income families. She was responsible for fundraising and implementing major housing programs, which included social housing and subsidized low-cost housing. She fundraised €15 million for a social housing project through the Council of Europe Development Bank. In 2008, Andoni and her team created a mortgage interest subsidy program, partnering with the private sector. More than 1500 subsidized mortgages were issued by 2012. By the end of 2022, more than 5,400 families have benefited from the program.

=== National Housing Agency of Albania ===
Andoni was appointed General Director of the National Housing Agency of Albania, which is a self-financing institution that focuses on affordable housing provision, where she delivered various housing programs, and developed for the first time low-cost affordable and energy-efficient housing projects that become a standard for NHA.

=== United Nations Economic Commissions for Europe ===
Andoni has been an Albanian delegate at the United Nations Economic Commission for Europe (UNECE) since 2001. She has been a member of the bureau of the Housing and Land Management Unit in Geneva, Switzerland since 2002 and was elected as Chair of the Committee since 2019. From 2012 to 2014, she served as a senior housing expert at the organization where she assisted the Secretariat with the collection of information on the status and challenges of the housing sector, preparation of papers and provision of advice and expertise.

== Academic career ==
Andoni is a guest lecturer at the International School for Architecture and Urban Planning (POLIS) in Tirana. She lectures and conducts research on subjects relating to housing policy, informal housing, and urban regeneration.

=== Published research ===
Andoni has co-authored several publications and articles on housing policies, including:

- Dervican Restoration and Housing (2020)
- Affordable Housing in Europe (2017)
- Affordable Housing and Housing Affordability in Europe (2017)
- Building Partnerships for Social Housing: Growing Housing Needs and Effective Solutions for Albanian Cities (2017)

=== Conferences and partnerships ===
Andoni collaborates with several organizations at both the local and international levels, where she advocates for social housing reform:

- Housing Europe
- Geneva Cities Hub
- Organisation for Economic Co-operation and Development (OECD)
- Affordable Housing Activation
