= Andoni Canela =

Spanish photographer

Andoni Canela Urizar (born 1969, Tudela, Navarra, Spain) is a Spanish photographer who specializes in nature and environment photography.

== Biography ==
Andoni Canela Urizar was born in Tudela, Navarra, in 1969. He holds a degree in journalism from the University of Barcelona and a degree in photography from the London College of Printing (UK).

He has worked since 1994 as a photographer, journalist and documentary filmmaker. His documentary film Looking for the Wild (Unai's journey) was released in 2016 in Madrid and was officially selected as a candidate for the Goya Awards as best documentary film.

He has published a dozen books on wildlife and nature and environmental issues. His latest book, La llamada del Puma (2015) with texts by Meritxell Margarit shows a journey of more than a year across all continents in search of wild animals with his family. In 2014, is published Sleeping amongst Wolves about the Iberian wolf in the wild. Before, in 2013, he published Looking for Fochas, which shows a year of observation with his son in the lake of Banyoles where he lives with his family. Among his previous works, La Mirada Salvaje-Encounters with the Iberian fauna stands out. This book gathers more than a hundred animals photographed in freedom in their Iberian habitats and narrates in first person the encounters with the most representative species. Other books of the author are: The Iberian Imperial Eagle, The Cantabrian Bear, Viaje Soñado, Aether and Planet Football. Many of his books have been translated into several languages.

Andoni Canela has photographed deserts, rainforests, glaciers, volcanoes, seas and mountains on five continents. He has also carried out numerous projects aimed at documenting the biology of endangered fauna of different habitats: the Bengal tiger in India, the panda in China, the gray whale of Baja California or the polar bear in the Arctic are some examples. He has photographed in freedom the most emblematic species of Iberian fauna: the brown bear, the wolf, the lynx, the bearded vulture or the imperial eagle. In 2009, he received the Godó Prize for Photojournalism for a report on the Iberian wolf.

His photographs appear regularly in media such as National Geographic, La Vanguardia, El País, BBC Wildlife, Newsweek and Sunday Times.

His work has been exhibited in numerous individual and collective exhibitions in Spain, Portugal, Italy, England and Korea such as El Ártico se rompe, an exhibition counting the effects of climate change on the Arctic. La Mirada Salvaje and Tierra de Linces, are also major exhibitions shown at Natural Science Museums of Madrid, Valencia and Valladolid, Museum of Jaén, Diputación de Sevilla, Bilbao and Botanical Garden of Lisbon.

== Work ==
=== Author books ===
- 1998. Catalunya, una mirada (texts selected by Meritxell Margarit). Ediciones P.A.U.
- 2003. Planeta fútbol (text by Rodolfo Chisleanschi). Editorial Blume.
- 2007. Aether. La esencia de los cuatro elementos (text by Meritxell Margarit, Sergio Rossi and Fernando Urízar). Editorial Mediterrània.
- 2008. Un viaje soñado (text by Xavier Moret). Biplano.
- 2008. El Oso Cantábrico (text by Fundación Oso Pardo). Caja Madrid /FOP.
- 2009. La Mirada Salvaje. Encuentros con la fauna ibérica (text by Andoni Canela and Eva van der Berg). Editorial Blume.
- 2011. Parcs naturals pas a pas. Xarxa de parcs naturals de la Diputació de Barcelona (text by Xavier Moret). Diputació de Barcelona.
- 2012. El Águila Imperial Ibérica. Fundación BBVA and Fundación Amigos del Águila Imperial.
- 2013. Looking for fochas. P.A.U. Education.
- 2014. Durmiendo con lobos (text by Andoni Canela and Juan Carlos Blanco). CálaOh! Books.
- 2015. La llamada del puma (text by Meritxell Margarit)

=== Featured reports ===
- August, 2004. Baobabs, raíces de África. En National Geographic España.
- March, 2005. Pirineos en invierno. En National Geographic España.
- July, 2005. Costa Rica: en el bosque nuboso. En "National Geographic" España.
- August, 2005. Costa Rica: las tierras bajas. En National Geographic España.
- May, 2007. Tras la huella del oso pardo. En National Geographic España y Portugal.
- September, 2012. Pandas, tesoros entre los bambús. En National Geographic España y Portugal.
- March, 2014. Bisontes, salvados al límite. En El Magazine de La Vanguardia.
- July, 2014. De caza con el puma. En El Magazine de La Vanguardia.
- January, 2015. El cazador infalible (sobre el cocodrilo de agua salada). En El Magazine de La Vanguardia.
- March, 2015. El ave de los dos cuernos (sobre el cálao bicorne). En El Magazine de La Vanguardia.

=== Collective books ===
- 2010. La huella de Félix (text by Odile Rodríguez de la Fuente). Editorial Grijalbo.

=== Main exhibitions ===
- 2007. Éter, la esencia de los cuatro elementos. Spain.
- 2008. Mar de mares (with the artist Assumpció Mateu). Spain.
- 2008. Expo Agua. (Latin American Pavilion in Expo Zaragoza). Spain.
- 2010. La Mirada Salvaje. Spain.
- 2010. En Tierra de Linces. Spain and Portugal.
- 2010. Los cuatro elementos, Gijón Botanical Garden, Asturias. Spain.
- 2011. Flaixos. Exhibition as guest photographer of the FotoMercè 2010. Spain.
- 2013. El Ártico se rompe. Traveling exhibition. España. Obra Social "la Caixa".

=== Awards ===
- 1995. Finalist of the Fotopress for a report on the fires of Catalonia during the summer of 1994.
- 1998. Barcelona Prize promoted by a Barcelona report published in El Magazine de La Vanguardia.
- 2009. Godó Prize of Photojournalism for a report on the Iberian wolf en El Magazine de La Vanguardia.
