= Sam Sam Etetegwung =

Nigerian politician

Hon. Sam Sam Etetegwung is a Nigerian politician and former member of the Rivers State House of Assembly, Andoni constituency between 2007 and 2011. He was appointed by the former Governor of Rivers State, H.E Rotimi Amaechi, as the Special adviser on Primary Education. In 2021, Etetegwung became the Secretary of the All Progressives Congress in Rivers State. He is currently the Secretary Rivers State Chapter of the African Democratic Congress
