= Ezekiel Warigbani =

Nigerian politician

Pastor Ezekiel Warigbani Zebulun, also known as Ezekiel Warigbani is Nigerian politician and youth advocate. He studied at the University of Port Harcourt and Eastern University. He was the Governorship candidate of the Advanced Peoples Democratic Alliance (APDA) in the 2019 Rivers State gubernatorial election. Aftermath of the election, he led the Coalition of all Governorship Candidates and Party Chairmen in Rivers State to Independent National Electoral Commission office in Port Harcourt on protest against the winner of the election Ezenwo Nyesom Wike. Presently, he is in a strong alliance with the Nigerian transportation minister, Rt.Hon. Rotimi Amaechi for a riverine governor of Rivers State in the forth coming 2023 Rivers State gubernatorial election.
