= Obolo language =

Cross River language spoken in Nigeria

Obolo
- Andoni
- Native to: Nigeria
- Region: Rivers State, Akwa Ibom State
- Ethnicity: Obolo people
- Native speakers: 318,000 (2011)
- Language family: Niger–Congo?: Atlantic–Congo; Benue–Congo; Cross River; Lower Cross; Obolo

Language codes
- ISO 639-3: ann
- Glottolog: obol1243

AudioObolo (or Andoni) is a major Cross River language of Nigeria. It is the most divergent language in the Lower Cross (LC) subgroup of Cross River, which is a branch of Benue-Congo. Obolo is the indigenous name of a community in the eastern Delta of the River Niger, better known as Andoni (the origin of this latter name being uncertain). Obolo refers to the people, the language as well as the land. It is an agglutinative, an SVO and a tonal language.

== Orthography ==
=== History ===
"The first published materials in Obolo language were some almanacs and calendars which were printed in early 1940's" by Andoni Progressive Union. It is believed that writing in the language may have started much earlier. After the almanacs and calendars, many hymns and prayer books have been printed by some churches in the area. Apart from these, in 1968, Mr. Matthew M. Urang wrote the first primer in Obolo language. This was the first published non-church book in the language. Next was "Reading and Writing Obolo" published in 1978 by the Rivers Readers Project, a government initiative aimed at producing reading materials in the local languages of Rivers State to support primary school education, to foster cultural sustainability and literacy in children's mother tongue language before transitioning to English.

The first professional linguistic analysis of Obolo was done between 1981 and 1983 by Dr. Nickolas Faraclas, of the University of California, Berkeley who was directed to Obolo by Prof. Kay Williamson of the University of Port Harcourt and the Rivers Readers Project, to work with the then Obolo Language Committee. Faraclas analyzed the language and wrote an extensive description of the phonology and grammar of the language, and helped to design the orthography.

In 1991, Uche Aaron, in collaboration with the Obolo Language and Bible Translation Committee, revised the orthography. The Nigeria Educational Research and Development Council (NERDC) published this updated orthography in 2000. Aaron's major contribution to this orthography, apart from some minor improvements, are in the areas of word boundaries and tone marking system.

=== Writing system ===
Obolo language is written in the Latin script. The alphabet is as follows:

Obolo alphabet
a	b	ch	d	e	f	g	gb
gw	i	j	k	kp	kw	l	m
n	n̄	nw	ny	o	ọ	p	r
s	(sh)	t	u	(v)	w	y	(z)

- The characters in bracket are dialect-specific.
- Tone marks can be added to some letters. The tone bearers are the vowels a, e, i, o, ọ, u as well as the consonants m and n.

Obolo is a tone language. There are five tones in the language: low, high, mid, falling and rising tone.

Indication of tones
High tone	(´) acute
Low tone	(`) grave
Mid tone	(ˉ) macron or unmarked
Falling tone	(ˆ) circumflex
Rising tone	(ˇ) caron

In writing, only the low tone (`) and falling tone (ˆ) are indicated. Tones are marked compulsorily on the first syllables of verbs and verbal groups. For other classes of words, only minimal pairs should be marked to avoid ambiguity.

== Dialects ==
There are six major dialect groups in the language, namely: (from west to east): Ataba, Unyeada, Ngo, Okoroete, Iko and Ibot Obolo. Ataba, Unyeada and Ngo dialects are spoken in Andoni LGA of Rivers State; Okoroete and Iko dialects is spoken in Eastern Obolo LGA of Akwa Ibom State while Ibot Obolo is spoken in Eastern Obolo LGA and Ibeno LGA of Akwa Ibom State. Okoroete dialect is also spoken in one community in Andoni LGA.

Ngo is the prestige dialect, hence the standard literary form of Obolo draws heavily from it.

== Standard Obolo ==
Literary Obolo, also known as Standard Obolo, is the written form of the language, the standard variety learned at school. Standard Obolo has its origin in the 1970s, when Rivers Readers Project published Reading and Writing Obolo, an Obolo grammar; and in the 1980s when the Obolo Bible Translation Committee started translation of the Bible. Though for a large part based on the Ngo dialect, Standard Obolo incorporates several features from other dialects.

All verbs in Standard Obolo are conjugated according to the Ataba dialect. Only certain focuses of the perfective/imperfective inchoative indicative non-future retain their Ngo dialect conjugation to avoid confusion with other conjugations.

== Numerals ==
Obolo language now uses a decimal counting system. "The modern counting system evolved with the publication of Aya Ifuk Obolo by the Obolo Language & Bible Translation Project in 1985. It is a shift from the vigesimal (based 20) counting to the decimal (based 10) counting system. The new system is much simpler than the old counting system, which is very limited and complex." The primary numerals are as follows:

0 - ofok

1 - ge

2 - iba

3 - ita

4 - ini

5 - go

6 - gweregwen

7 - jaaba

8 - jeeta

9 - onaan̄ge

ten - akọp

hundred - efit

thousand - obop

million - efie

billion - ego

trillion - ngwugwu

== Obolo literature ==
There is a small body of literature in the Obolo language, including books, periodicals, and pamphlets. Obolo is used in radio and television programmes and is taught at primary and junior secondary levels.

- The first primer was written by Matthew M. Urang in 1968.
- Reading and Writing Obolo was first published in 1978 by Rivers Readers Project (revised 1985 by NBTT, new edition 2023 by OLBTO)
- Ikpa Urọk, a book of folktales in different dialects of Obolo, was published in 1985.
- Adasi Ikpa Obolo, a primer following the approved orthography, was published in 1985 (last revised in 2023).
- Ida Obolo, the Obolo language periodical, was first issued in 1985.
- The Obolo New Testament Bible was published in 1991.
- Mbuban Îchaka by Isidore Ene-Awaji - the first literary material on Literature in the Mother-Tongue; a novel for Junior Secondary Schools and public readership, was published in 2010 © Obolo Language & Bible Translation Organization.
- The Bible in Obolo was completed by the Obolo Language and Bible Translation Project (OLBTP) in 2012 and dedicated in 2014. Obolo is the 23rd Nigerian language to have the complete Bible.
- The Obolo language website, obololanguage.org, was launched in 2016.
- Obolo Wikipedia went live on 14th October, 2024.
- Inu Îyiyala Isan̄a, a translation of Chinua Achebe's Things Fall Apart first appeared in 2025, though completed some years back.

== Regulation ==
Obolo language is regulated by the Obolo Language and Bible Translation Organization (OLBTO), a community-owned research and development organization that does dialect surveys and research, oversees the development and introduction of new terminologies, publishes books in the language, etc.
