= Andoni Elephant Park =

Sanctuary in Rivers State, Nigeria

Andoni Elephant Park or Andoni Elephant Sanctuary is a community forest located on Andoni Island in the Niger Delta in Rivers State, Nigeria.

The reserve was officially gazetted in 1983 by the then Government of Rivers State under Chief Melford Okilo. The island measures about 124 square kilometres and consist of three ecological zones; freshwater swamp forest, tidal flat (estuaries, mangrove and creeks) and Atlantic beach. According to United Nations Development Programme's Niger Delta Biodiversity Project Report 2012, Andoni Island, though relatively small in size compared to other national parks in Nigeria, represents some of the last remaining pristine natural resources, home to some Nigeria's endemic or near endemic mammals species on the IUCN Red List. Some of the wildlife that are residents in the park includes; African forest elephant, pygmy hippopotamus, West African manatee, the aquatic antelope sitatunga and the waterbuck.
