= Snake Island (Lagos) =

Island in Nigeria

Coordinates: 6.423°N 3.296°E

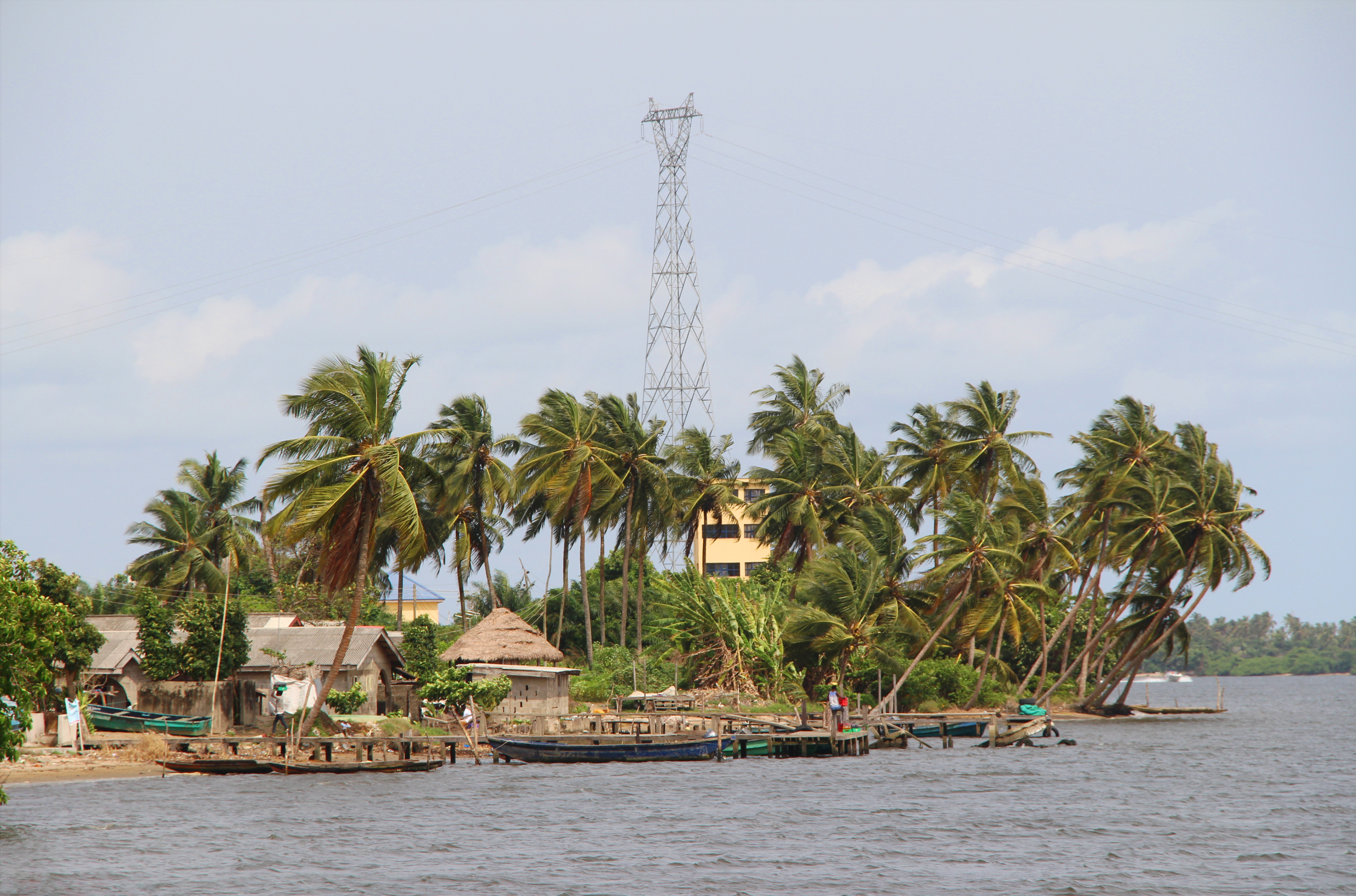

Snake Island is an island of Lagos, located opposite Tin Can Island Port and Apapa. Named because of its snake-like topography, the island is about 14 km in length and 1.4 km wide. Compared to the rest of Lagos, it is less developed and mainly accessible by water transport. The inhabitants comprises a cluster of ten resident communities namely: Imore, Ibeshe, Irede, Ilashe, Ibasa, Igbologun, Igbo-Esenyore, Igbo-Osun, Ikare, and Iyagbe.

The first season of the reality television series Gulder Ultimate Search took place on the Island. The Nigerdock shipyard was established on the Island in 1986.
