= Andoni River =

River in Nigeria

Coordinates: 4°26′N 7°20′E

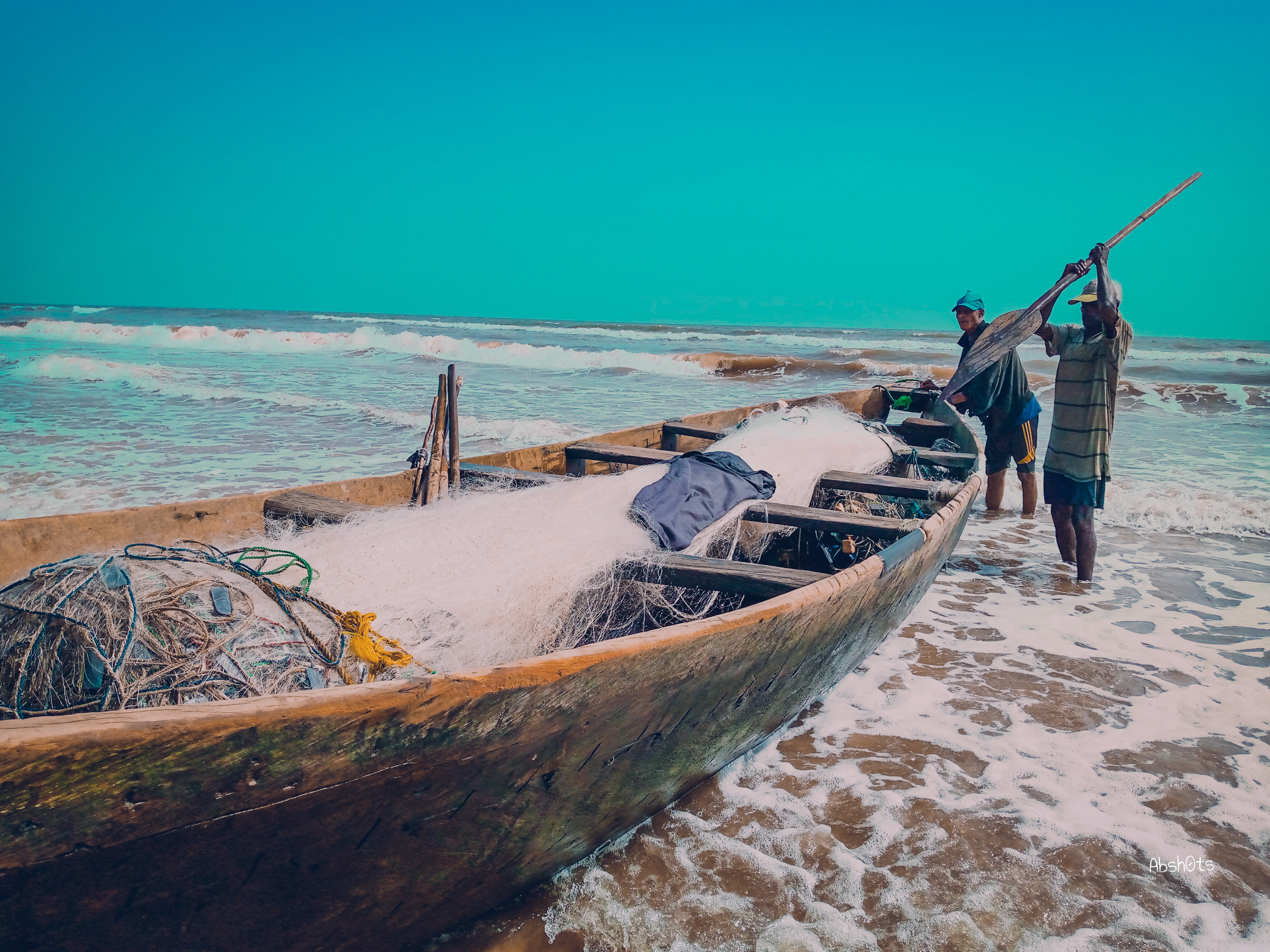

The Andoni River (Okwan Obolo) is one of the many rivers in Rivers State, Nigeria. Andoni River is located between the New Calabar River and Imo River. It is believed to have derived its name from St. Anthony, a European explorer who visited the area in 15th century. The mouth of the river gives way to large mangroves which are an important habitat for aquatic animals.

== Fauna ==
The river is host to many fish species including Sarotherodon melanotheron, Galeoides decadactylus, and Ilisha africana. Additionally the river mangroves are home to the many other aquatic animals including oysters Crassostrea gasar and shrimp Penaeus monodon. Over the last decade evidence has emerged that the river and its estuary are declining in capacity to support habitats for local fish populations.

== Pollution ==
Report says in 2022 that Andoni River is one of the rivers in Rivers State that is being polluted by oil spillage as a result of illegal oil refinery. The estuary is also enduring contamination from quick hydrocarbon contamination sources and nearby contamination from dissolved sullied dregs, released household and human squander, and long separate stream contamination.
