= Andoni Island =

Island in Rivers State, Nigeria

- Location in Nigeria

Geography
- Location: Niger Delta
- Coordinates: 4°27′45″N 7°27′47″E
- Area: 124 km^{2} (48 sq mi)

Administration
- Nigeria
- State: Rivers State
- Local government area: Andoni

Andoni Island is a barrier island on the eastern fringe of the Niger Delta in Rivers State, Nigeria. The island measures about 124 square kilometres (48 sq mi). The island is a Key Biodiversity Area, which is suitable for conservation activities such as the Andoni Elephant Park and a marine park preserving the local ecosystem.

== Wildlife ==
Andoni Island is known for housing the endangered African forest elephant (Loxodonta cyclotis). In 2011, it was estimated that between 2 and 11 elephants lived on Andoni Island; this number had risen to about 12 in 2018. In May 2020, CITES' protection plan for Nigeria included the establishment of a migratory corridor for elephants in the area.

The island also houses pygmy hippopotamuses and different species of sea turtles. Migratory dolphin species usually visit the Atlantic shores of the island during summer.
