= Andoni =

Andoni Obolo Ngo, Isi-Ama, Unyeada, Asarama, Ikuru, Ataba
- Local Government Area
- Interactive map of Andoni
- Location within Nigeria
- Coordinates: 4°32′57″N 7°26′47″E
- Country: Nigeria
- State: Rivers State
- Date created: 1991
- Seat: Ngo

Government
  - Type: ANDONI LOCAL GOVERNMENT COUNCIL
  - Local Government Chairman: Hon. PRINCE LUCKY PROMISE OTUO JP (APC)
  - Deputy Local Government Chairman: HON. MRS. RACHEAL EZEKIEL ABIGBANI (APC)
  - Local Government Council: Ward 1: John Timothy Bibo (PDP); Ward 2: Gideon Sylvanus Paul (PDP); Ward 4: Benjamin James Ekprikpo (PDP); Ward 5: Gogo Nmeme Ikuru (PDP); Ward 6: Sheila Jacob Nte (PDP); Ward 7: Oguiko Israel Iyo (PDP); Ward 8: Thomas George Amini (PDP); Ward 9: Ronyem Atajit Urang (PDP); Ward 10: Allen Inomo (PDP); Ward 11: Beatrice Patterson (PDP)

Area
  - Land: 233 km^{2} (90 sq mi)

Population (2006)
  - Total: 311,500
  - Density: 1,340/km^{2} (3,460/sq mi)
- Time zone: UTC+1 (WAT)
- Postal code: 504

Andoni is a Local Government Area in Rivers State, Nigeria. Its headquarters is located in Ngo-Town. It has an area of over 233 km^{2} and a population of over 311,500 at the last census. The postal code of the area is 504. The current Executive Chairman of Andoni Local Government Area is Hon. Prince Lucky Promise Otuo JP. The Andoni people are of cross River ancestry and belong to the Obolo clan, a distinct ethnic group. It shares boundaries with Khana to the North, Opobo Nkoro to the east, Bonny to the west and the Atlantic Ocean to the south.

== Economy and development ==
The Local government has been ages strives on an agrarian economy with nimble footing on fish, shrimp, and crop farming. From Oyorokoto which is incidentally referred to as the biggest fishing port in the west Africa, to Okoroboile to Ngo Town , Asarama, Ataba, and Unyeada Kingdom, the people of the area are toiled in fish farming and sea food harvesting. The creeks, beaches, and aquatic and terrestrial wildlife are some of the peculiarities of the local government area.

== Andoni Unity Carnival ==
The Andoni unity carnival is a five-days amusing annual event in the local government area, the event is organised to showcase the culture of the people of the area in the month of December to end up at the first week in January. The event is sparked with activities like boat regatta, Coconut festival, beach Carnival and more. Andoni local government is the only area in Rivers State, where you can spot Elephants, also other sea mammals like Dolphins, as well as turtles, crocodiles and other wild creatures. Its inaugural carnival was held from the 18th of December 2021 to the 5th of January 2022, under the leadership of Mr. Erastus Charles Awortu. It included the coral of nine lessons ( December 18th), boat regatta ( December 30th ), peace walk ( January 3rd ), beach party( January 4th) and the cultural parade ( January 5th ).

== Climate/Geography ==
Andoni LGA encompasses 233 square kilometres or 90 square miles in total, with an average humidity of 90%. The region has an average temperature of 25 degrees Celsius or 77 degrees Fahrenheit, and its topography includes a number of rivers and their tributaries.

== List of past chairmen ==
- Chief Hon. Ibiamu Ikanya
- Hon. Godson Dienye
- Hon. Monwon Etete
- Hon. Fynface Ayaye
- Hon. Mrs. Emilia Nte
- Chief (Barr.) Erastus Awortu DSSRS
- Hon. Ikwut Emmanuel Friday

== See also ==
- Obolo people
- Ijaw people
