= List of libraries in Nigeria =

The following is a list of libraries in Nigeria.

== List of libraries in Nigeria ==
Library	Location	State	Year Established	Website	Type
Abubakar Tafawa Balewa University Library	Bauchi	Bauchi State	1981	https://portal.atbu.edu.ng/library/	Academic library
African Heritage Research Library and Cultural Center	Adeyipo Village, Ibadan	Oyo State	1988	https://uia.org/s/or/en/1100033713	Research Library
Augustine University Library, Augustine University Ilara-Epe, Lagos State	Epe	Lagos State	2015	https://augustineuniversity.edu.ng/	Academic library
Kashim Ibrahim Library, Ahmadu Bello University Zaria, Kaduna	Zaria	Kaduna State	1962	https://library.abu.edu.ng/	Academic library
Akwa Ibom State Library	Uyo	Akwa Ibom State	2007	https://aksu.edu.ng/newsite/library/#	Public library
Azaiki Public Library	Yenagoa	Bayelsa State	1998	https://www.azaikilibrary.org/	Public library
Ibom E-library	Uyo	Akwa Ibom State	2007		Public library
Federal University of Technology Owerri Library	Owerri	Imo State	1982	https://library.futo.edu.ng/	Academic library
Federal University Birnin-Kebbi	Birnin Kebbi	Kebbi State	2014	http://www.library.fubk.edu.ng/	Academic library
Federal University Dutsinma	Dutsin-Ma	Kastina State	2011	http://elibrary.fudutsinma.edu.ng/	Academic library
Federal University Lafia	Lafia	Nasarawa	2011	http://library.fulafia.edu.ng/	Academic library
Federal University Lokoja	Lokoja	Kogi	2011		Academic library
National Centre for Agricultural Mechanization (NCAM) Library	Ilorin	Kwara State	2004		Research library
American University of Nigeria library	Yola	Adamawa State	2003	http://library.aun.edu.ng/	Academic library
Enugu State Library Board, Central Library	Enugu	Enugu State	1955		Public library
Anambra State Library Board.	Awka Onitsha, Abagana, Nnewi, Ajalli, Nkpologwu, Amichi, Adazi Nnukwu, Ozubulu, Ihembosi	Anambra State	1966	http://anambraelibrary.org.ng/index.php/en/	Public library
Badagry Divisional Library	Badagry	Ojo		https://libraryboard.lagosstate.gov.ng/	Public library
Bauchi State Library Board	Bauchi	Bauchi State	1976	https://hotels.ng/places/library/1371-bauchi-state-library	Public library
Bayelsa Public Library	Yenagoa	Bayelsa	Construction began 2002 (ongoing)		Public library
Bayero University library	kano	Kano State	1964	https://library.buk.edu.ng/	Academic library
Borno House Library	Jakande Estate, Amuwo Odofin	Lagos state			Public library
Cross River State Library	Calabar	Cross River State	1989		Public library
Delta State Polytechnic Library	Oghara	Delta State	Nov 2002	https://ogharapoly.edu.ng/academics/library	Academic library
Edo State Library Board	Benin City	Edo State	1971		Public library
Enugu State Central Library	Enugu	Enugu State	1958		Public library
Epe Divisional Library	Epe	Lagos state			Public library
Goethe Institute library	Lagos	Lagos State	1962	https://www.goethe.de/ins/ng/en/kul/bib.html	Public Library
Gombe State University Library	Gombe	Gombe State	2004		Academic Library
Henry Carr Library	Agege, Lagos	Lagos state			Public library
Herbert Macaulay Library	Yaba, Lagos	Lagos State	1966	https://www.gtbank.com/about/corporate-social-responsibility/education/you-read-initiative	Public library
High Court Library of Lagos State	Ikeja	Lagos State	1900		Law library
Ikeja Secretariat Library	Ikeja	Lagos State	1980	https://ikejarecord.com/where-you-can-find-public-libraries-in-lagos/	Public library
Ikorodu Divisional Library	Ikorodu	Lagos State			Public library
Ilupeju Public Library	Ilupeju	Lagos state			Public library
Imo State Library Board	Owerri	Imo State	1976		Public library
International Institute of Tropical Agriculture library	Ibadan	Oyo state	1967		
Ipaja Public Library	Shagari Estate	Lagos state			Public library
Isolo Public Library	Isolo	Lagos State			Public library
Jenta Reads Community Library	Jenta Mangoro, Jos	Plateau State	2017		Public library
Jos Museum library	Jos	Plateau State	1952		Public library
Kaduna State Library Board	Kaduna	Kaduna State	1952	https://kdsg.gov.ng/2021/03/06/kaduna-state-library-board/	Public library
Kano State Library Board	Kano	Kano State	1968	https://www.kanostatelibrary.com/about.html	Public library
Kenneth Dike Memorial Library	Awka	Anambra State			
Kenneth Dike Library, University of Ibadan	Ibadan	Oyo State	1948	http://library.ui.edu.ng/	Academic library
Kwara State Library	Ilorin	Kwara State	1968		Public library
Lagos City Libraries	Lagos	Lagos State			Public library
Lagos Library	Lagos	Lagos State	1932		Subscription library
Lagos State e-learning Centre	Lagos	Lagos State	2012		Public library
Lagos State Library Board	Ikeja	Lagos State	1964	https://libraryboard.lagosstate.gov.ng/	Public library
Medical Research Institute library	Lagos	Lagos State	1945	https://www.mri.gov.lk/units/health-information/mri-library/	Medical library
National Library of Nigeria	Abuja	Federal Capital Territory	1962	https://www.nln.gov.ng/	National library
National Library, Calabar	Calabar	Cross River State	1964		National
National Library, Kwara	Ilorin	Kwara State	1980		National
National Museum library	Lagos	Lagos State	1957		national museum of Nigeria,
Nile University of Nigeria Library	Abuja	Federal Capital Territory	2009	https://nileuniversity.edu.ng/nile-library/	Academic library
Northern Regional Library	Kaduna	Kaduna State	1967		Public library
Ogun State Library	Abeokuta	Ogun State	1976		Public library
Ondo State Library Board	Akure	Ondo State	1976		Public library
Orolu Local Government Library	Ifon Osun	Osun State	1990		Public library
Oyo State Library	Ibadan	Oyo State	1954		Public library
Plateau State Library Board	Jos	Plateau State	1976		Public library
Rivers State Central Library	Port Harcourt	Rivers State	1962		Public library
Tolu Public Library	Ajegunle	Lagos State			Public library
Unesco mobile library		Enugu State	1958		Mobile library
University of Jos Library, Jos	Jos	Plateau State	1972	https://www.unijos.edu.ng/library	Academic library
University of Nigeria, Nsukka libraries	Nsukka	Enugu State	1960	http://unn.edu.ng/library	Academic library
Zaccheus Onumba Dibiaezue Memorial Libraries	Ikoyi	Lagos State	2000	http://zodml.org/	
Federal University of Agriculture, Abeokuta	Abeokuta	Ogun State	1988	Nimbe Adedipe Library, FUNAAB	Academic library
Donald E. U. Ekong Library, University of Port Harcourt	Port Harcourt	Rivers State		http://library.uniport.edu.ng/	Academic library
Olusegun Obasanjo Presidential Library	Abeokuta	Ogun state	2017	https://oopl.org.ng/	Private library
Abdullahi Mohammed Public Library, A.B.U Samaru	Samaru - Zaria	Kaduna State	1963	https://library.abu.edu.ng/pages/amp_library.php	Public Library

== See also ==
- Librarians' Registration Council of Nigeria
- List of universities in Nigeria
- List of polytechnics in Nigeria
- Mass media in Nigeria
- Nigerian literature
