= Enugu State Library =

Public library in Nigeria

Coordinates: 6.43441°N 7.49066°E

- Location: Enugu State, Nigeria
- Type: Public
- Established: 1958

Enugu State Central Library is a library located along the crowded market in Enugu State. It was founded by UNESCO in 1958 in response to the need for a public library in Nigeria. According to a reporter, Patrick Egwu, who pretended to be a user, the library buildings were damaged with leaky roofs.

== History ==
Enugu State Central Library was established in 1958 by United Nations Educational, Scientific and Cultural Organization (UNESCO) in order to meet the demand for more public libraries in the country. It was referred to as the best library in West Africa and was handed over to the premier of Eastern Nigeria, Michael Iheonukara Okpara. The two public libraries in Enugu are the Enugu State Central Library and a branch of National Library of Nigeria.

== Collections ==
To use the library, a registration fee of #1,000 is required, which permits full access to the books on the shelves. However, the books available are outdated, mostly 1960–1970 publications.

== Challenges ==
According to the Guardian, Enugu State Central Library, besides a shortage of current books, suffers from a lack of payment of staff and dilapidated buildings requiring renovation.

== See also ==
- List of libraries in Nigeria
- Enugu State
- List of academic libraries in Nigeria
- Benue state
- National library of Nigeria
