= Azaiki Public Library =

Public library in Nigeria

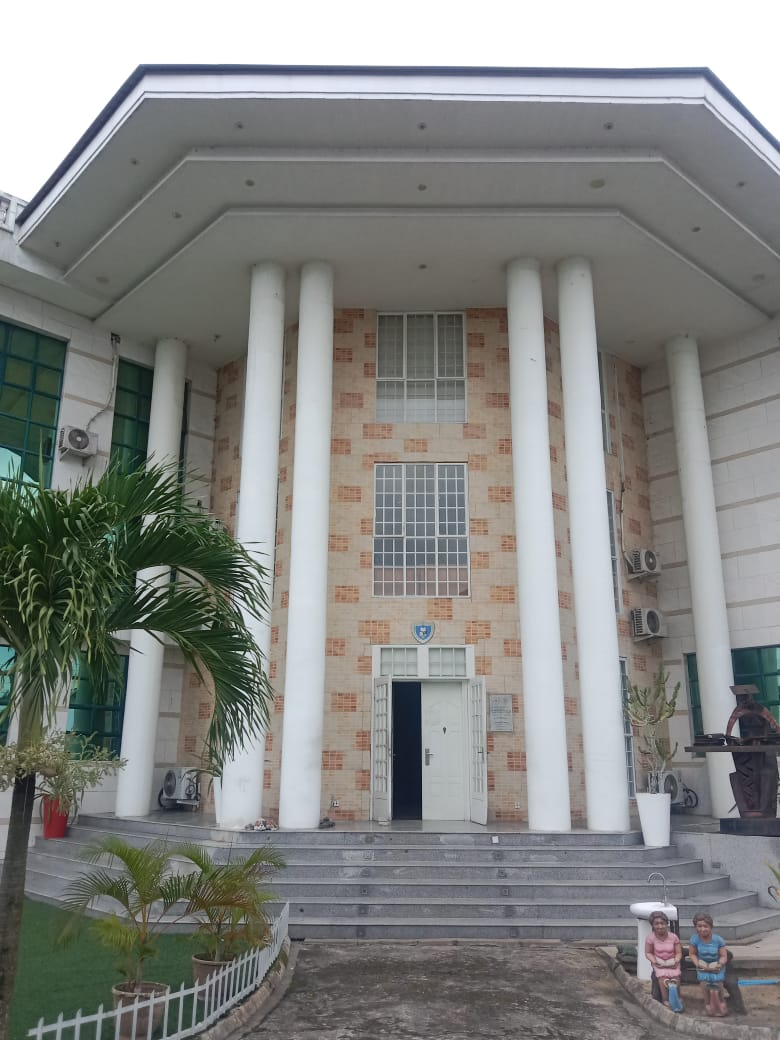
- 4.9329219°N 6.2828175°E
- Location: Yenagoa, Oloibiri, Nigeria
- Type: Public library
- Established: 2015

Collection
- Items collected: Books, journals, newspapers, magazines, sound and music recordings, patents, databases, maps, stamps, prints, drawings and manuscripts

Access and use
- Access requirements: Open to students, researchers and general public

Other information
- Website: www.azaikilibrary.org

Azaiki Public Library is a registered public library in Yenogoa, Bayelsa State, Nigeria which supply books and reading materials to students and educational institutions. The library is suitable for reading, preparing for educational exams such as GMAT, SAT and browsing the internet. in 2020, the library was one of the properties destroyed during a protest in Bayelsa. At the Ijaw Economic Summit, The library is referred to as one of the best public libraries in Niger Delta. as the library play important role in the preservation of Ijaw language

== History ==
Azaiki foundation is owned by Steve Azaiki, the Bayelsa State government former secretary. The implementation of a public library begin in 1999 and after some contributions from Azaiki, his family and directors of his foundation. Azaiki Public Library was established on May 19, 2015, and was commissioned by the former president of Nigeria, Goodluck Jonathan represented by Shakarau . The commission of the library was also witnessed by Henry Seriake Dickson, the incumbent Governor of Bayelsa at that time, represented by his chief of staff, Talford Ongolo. Azaiki Public Library is a library with cool environment and good facilities to serve the public, free of charge.

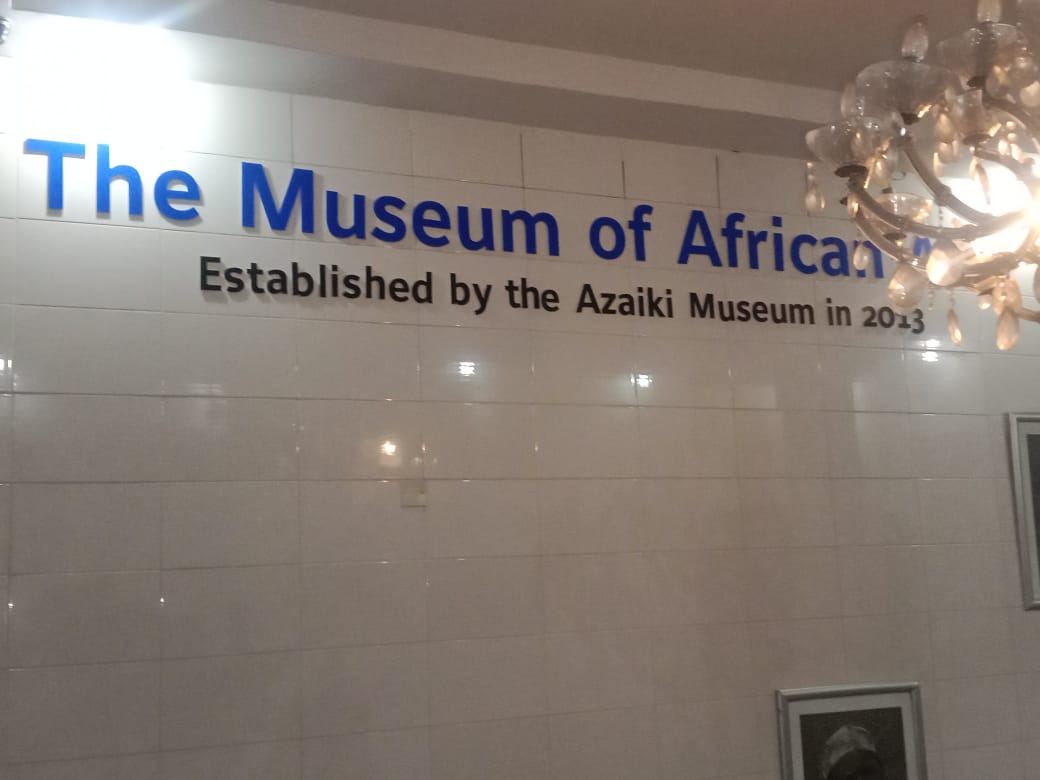
Museum in Azaiki Public Library,located in Yenegoa, Bayelsa State, Nigeria

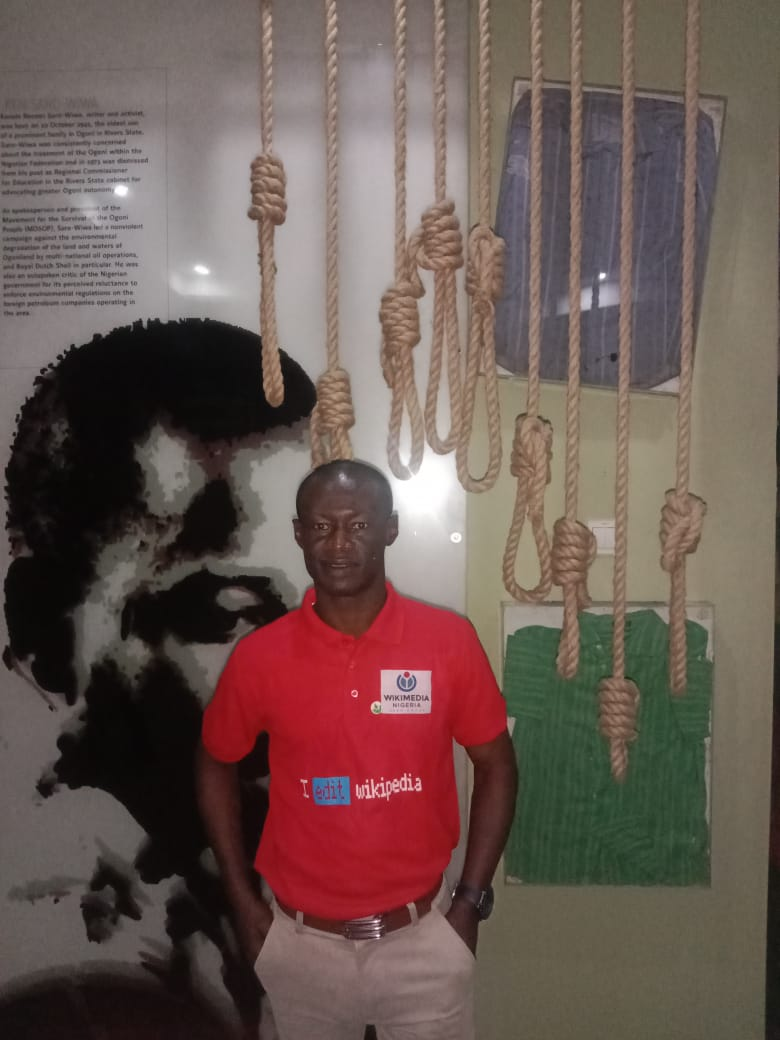
Ken Saro-Wiwa's Portrait in Azaiki Public Library

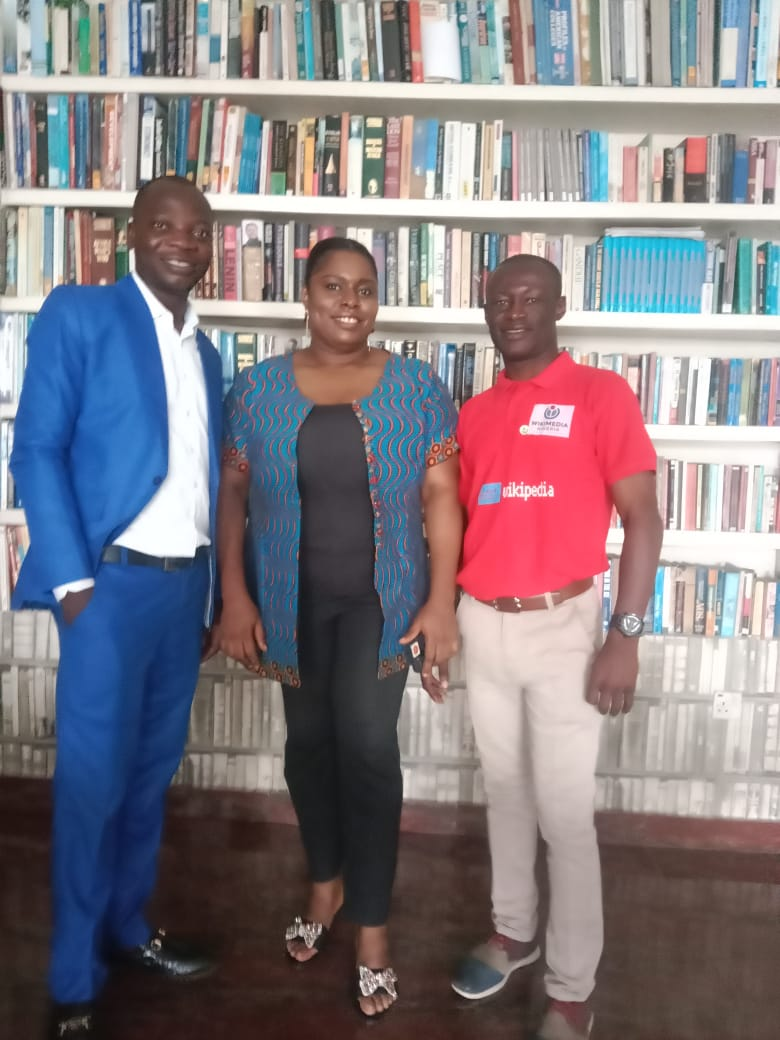
Library tour at Azaiki Public Library

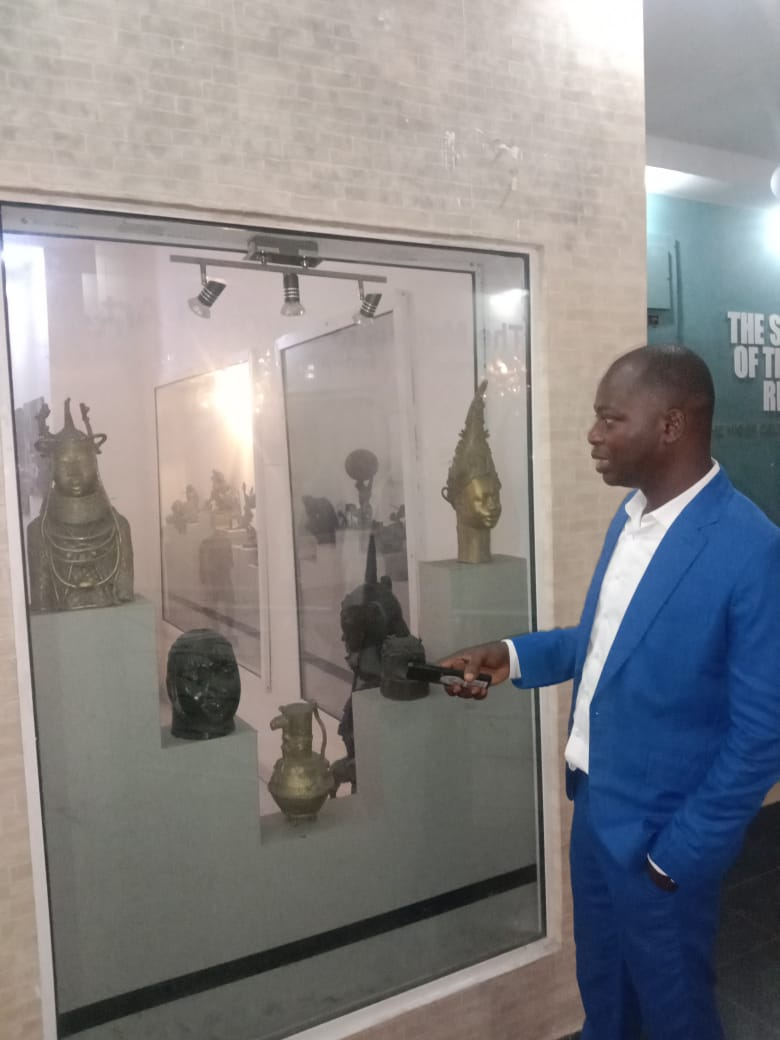
Benin kingdom display

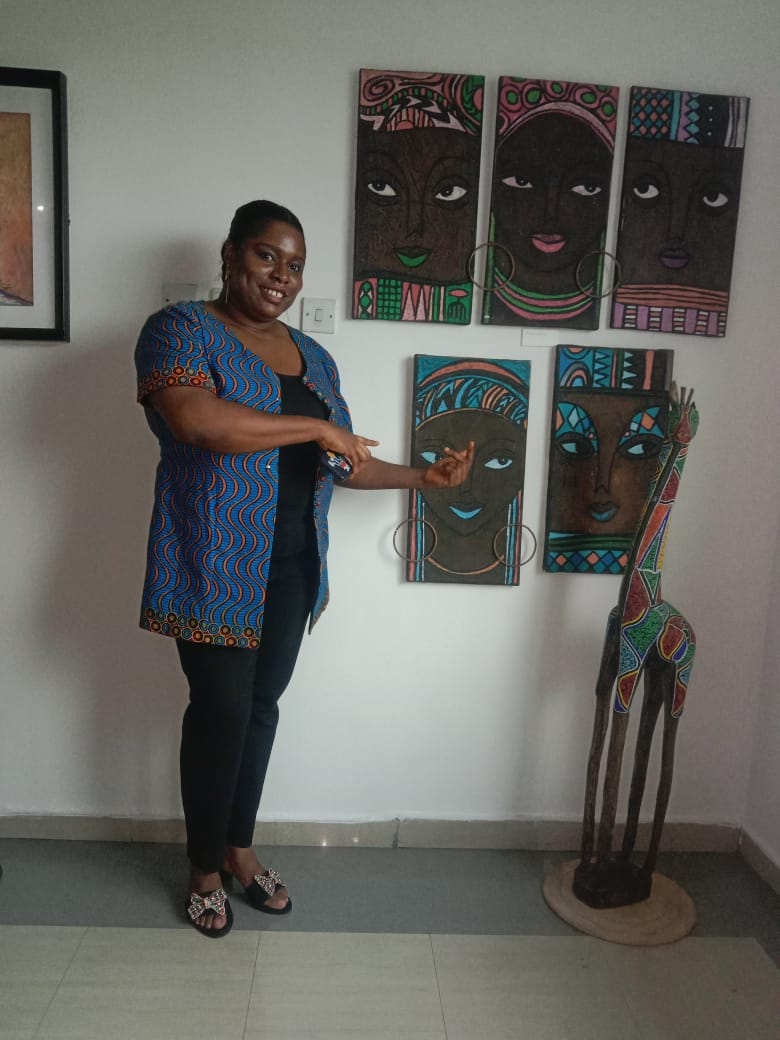
Artistic display

== Books and References ==
- Company law
- Novels
- Nigerian Law review
- Local registrations
- Nigerian regulations regarding drugs, medical devices, foods, environment
- Local and regional information, service providers etc
- In-house databases and directories of service providers
- In-house databases and directories of business mentors
- In-house databases and directories of financiers
- In-house databases and directories of government funding sources and supporting mechanisms
- Technology trends and reviews
- Technology Review
- Nature
- Science
- Agriculture Books and Review
- Social Science Books & Review
- Engineering Books & Review
- Nigerian Government Contracts gazette

== See also ==
- National Library of Nigeria
- Federal University of Technology Owerri Library
- Ibom E-Library
