= Samuel Adegboyega University Library =

Academic library in Nigeria

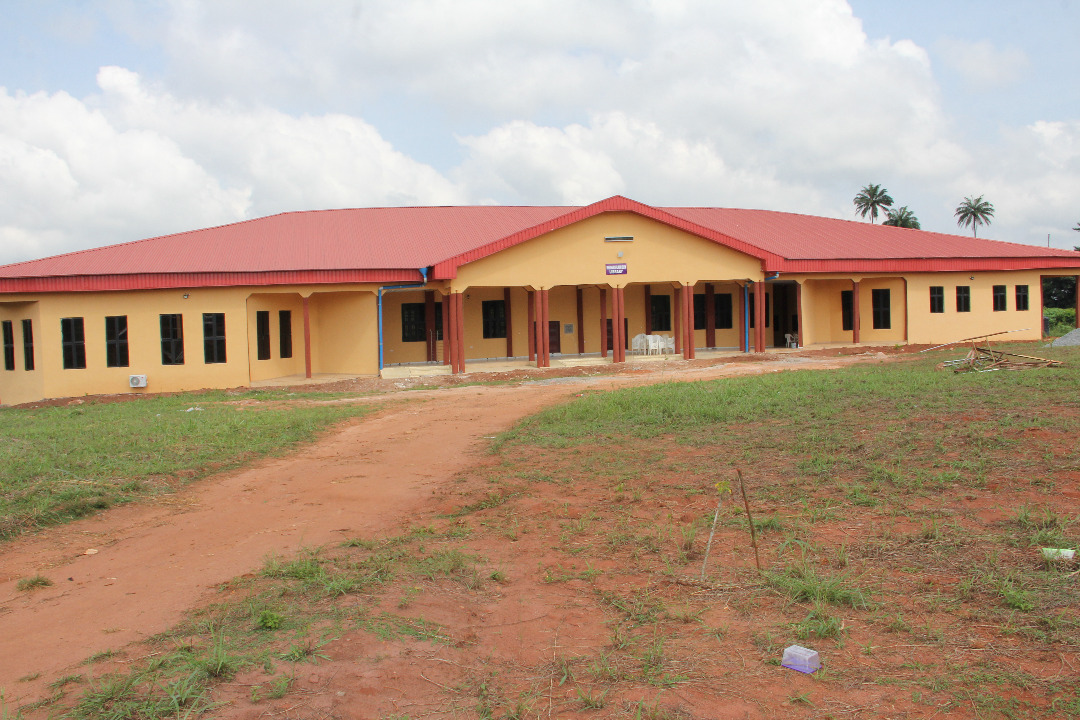
- Formation: 7 March 2011
- Type: Academic Library
- Location: Ogwa, Edo
- Coordinates: 6.6342°N 5.9304°E
- Website: https://sau.edu.ng/academics/library/

Samuel Adegboyega University Library, also known as Samson Adedoyin Library, is an academic library located in the central part of Edo State, South-South, Nigeria. The library is the centre of academic activities in Glorious Vision University in Ogwa Community in Edo State, Nigeria.

The Library holds large volumes of collections in print and nonprint formats. In addition to serving the university community, the library also serves the Esan communities, as it has collections on Esan culture and history. The library is located near the school cafeteria, sports centre, the John Aluko Babatope Multipurpose Hall, and the students' hostel, all within the university premises. The parent institution of the library is the Glorious Vision University, a faith-based institution established by The Apostolic Church Nigeria, Lagos, Western and Northern Areas (LAWNA) Territory. The six hundred seating capacity Library houses different sections and units, such as the E-library, Readers' Services, Technical Services, Collection Development, Serials, Law, and the reprographic and bindery section. The library provides learning, information, teaching, and research materials for students and academic and non-teaching personnel of the university, as well as for members of the surrounding Esan communities. The usable floor area of the library building is 1,057 square metres.

== History ==
The Library was birthed on 7 March 2011, when its parent institution, Samuel Adegboyega University, was awarded the licence to operate by the National Universities Commission (NUC), as the 45th private and 117th overall in the Nigerian university system. Consequently, the library was established and refurbished initially to cater to the information needs of students and staff of the university community. The services offered by the library were further expanded to cater to the Esan community with the establishment of the Centre for Research and Development of Esanland (CERDEL) in the University.

The Library started in a temporary location in the Senate Building of the university with a usable floor area of 295.07 square meters and with a sitting capacity for 150 users. On 15 November 2019, the permanent building of the library was commissioned by Pastor (DR.) Samson E. Igwe (JP), the national president of The Apostolic Church Nigeria.

== Collections ==
The library has collections in the form of monographs, journals, reference books, projects, and inaugural lectures, as well as a collection of newspapers. The Library also has different electronic resources and databases. The library acquires volumes of books covering all programmes being offered at the University periodically. Beyond that, the library maintains a collection of Christian literature to aid the spiritual development and enrichment of the users. Currently, the library has access to over 30 different electronic databases.

== Administration and staffing ==
The head of the library is the 'University Librarian' (UL). The UL is responsible for the day-to-day administration of the library and is assisted by other librarians who are in charge of the different sections and units in the Library. The Library has professional, para-professional, and nonprofessional staff. The professional staff have at least a Masters's degree in Librarianship and the para-professional staff have Diplomas in Librarianship. The non-professionals in the Library have no formal library training or qualifications in librarianship.

== Automation ==
The Library operates an automated system using the KOHA Library Management software. Most of the library routine activities, such as registration of Library users, charging and discharging of library materials ar, e done using the library management system. Bibliographic details of the Library collections are held in digitised formats accessible through computer terminals in the college libraries and in the main Library.

== Major services provided ==
The services provided in the library including buare t not limited to reference services, reprographic and binding services, research support services, twelve hours reading room services, printing services, charging and discharging of library materials, user education/information literacy training; reference services; collection development services; technical services; serials; special collection services; internet services; e-library services; information retrieval; literature search services; and selective dissemination of information/current awareness services, amongst others.

== See also ==
- Academic libraries in Nigeria
