= Isolo Public library =

Public library in Nigeria

Coordinates: 6.53424°N 3.33022°E

- Location: Lagos State, South West, Nigeria
- Type: Public

Collection
- Items collected: Books

Isolo Public library is one of the 18 libraries established in Lagos State to encourage a reading culture in the residents of the state. It is under the Lagos State library board. Other libraries include Ikeja Secretariat library, Tolu Public library, Borno house library, and the Ipaja Public library.

== History ==
The library was built by th K.A Junaid, who was the Sole administrator of Oshodi-Isolo local government from 98-99.

== Collections ==
According to reports gathered in 2012 by the Guardian, there are about 168,812 books available for 177,573 readers and 138,721 are the volumes of books read in the libraries in Lagos altogether.

== Renovation ==
Changes were made to the library to introduce new facilities such as fans, chairs, tables and air conditioning in order to reduce heat and make it more conducive for use.

== Structure ==
Isolo Public library is large enough to contain about 120-150 people and according to the report from the Guardian's visit to the library, it opens at 8 am and closes in the evening around 4 pm.

== See also ==
- List of libraries in Nigeria
- Lagos State University of Science and technology
