= Olusegun Oke Library =

Academic library of Ladoke Akintola University of Technology, Ogbomosho

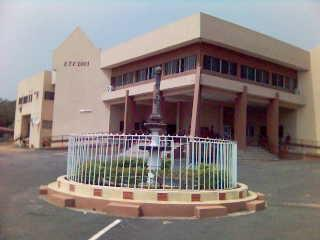
- Location: Ogbomoso, Nigeria
- Established: 1990

Other information
- Director: Prof. Adefunke Sarah Ebijuwa (University Librarian)
- Website: https://library.lautech.edu.ng/

Olusegun Oke Library (OOL) is the main academic library of the Ladoke Akintola University of Technology (LAUTECH), Ogbomoso in Oyo State, Nigeria. It was formerly known as LAUTECH Library and was established in July 1990, some months after the inauguration of the university. It was set up as one of the academic units in the university.

Olusegun Oke Library was renamed after Professor Olusegun Oke, the first Vice-Chancellor of the university. It serves as the nerve center of academic activities in the Ladoke Akintola University of Technology, Ogbomoso in Oyo State, Nigeria. It houses different sections and units such as the Readers Service Unit, Technical Service Unit, Acquisitions Unit, Serials Unit, Reference Section and Virtual /E-Library. The library allows a large proportion of its materials on open access. Hence, it plays the crucial role of providing users with all the materials and services for the continued support of current research academic priorities. It is a complex of libraries comprising the main library and Faculty/College libraries such as the Medical Library; Faculty libraries; departmental libraries and the Olusegun Oke Library Annex.

== History ==
Olusegun Oke Library was established in July 1990, after the establishment of the university with the major aim of supporting the vision and mission of the university in the area of teaching, learning and research activities. At inception, it occupied a small space in the building, now referred to as Bookshop and Internal Audit. The OOL has witnessed impressive physical developments, starting from a building that provided 82 seats between 1990 and 1999, to a building complex with 2,400 seats in 2002, comprising various offices, conference room, stores, etc. The library moved to its present site courtesy of the then Vice-Chancellor Prof. A. M Salau, JP. FIN.

The library, in its bid to serve as the university's main hub for all electronic resources and management, established a virtual and electronic library in 2007 and 2012 respectively. The Universal Service Provision Fund (USPF), an arm of the Nigerian Communication Commission, supported the establishment of the full-fledged virtual library and electronic library in the university.

In 2018, library spaces evolved to meet campus needs by the setting up of an Annexe Library referred to as the Olusegun Oke Library Annexe. The aim of the Annexe Library was to meet the academic needs of the medical community. The National Information Technology Development Agency (NITDA) through its commitment to implementing the National Information Technology Policy, assisted OOL Annexe with the Library Software Management System, Ebscohost database and electronic gadgets in March 2018.

The maiden edition of the World Book Day (WBD), designated by UNESCO, was marked on March 1, 2018 which was co-sponsored by the library in collaboration with Information Network for the Availability of Scientific Publications (INASP) and OXFORD OXION, England.

On August 14, 2024, Prof. Adefunke Sarah Ebijuwa assumed office as the University Librarian of Ladoke Akintola University of Technology. She holds the distinction of being the first alumnus of LAUTECH to rise to the position of a Principal Officer and the first indigenous female of the institution to attain this rank. Subsequently, on July 1, 2025, she was promoted to the rank of Professor of Library and Information Science, becoming the first sitting University Librarian to attain this distinction.

== Collections ==
The library holds over 42,000 volumes of print collections and 10 million electronic resources in different databases, relating to almost all fields of knowledge within the community. It has collections in the form of monographs, newspapers, periodicals, magazines, journals, inaugural lecture series, reference books, students' projects, dissertations and theses. OOL acquires volumes of books covering all programs being offered periodically in the university. Currently, the library is subscribed to fourteen different electronic databases.

== Administration and staffing ==
The University Librarian (UL) heads the library. The UL is responsible for the day-to-day coordination of the library and is assisted by other librarians who are in charge of the different sections and units. The staffing has three categories: professional, para-professional and non-professional staff. While the professional staff include those with at least a master's degree in Librarianship, the para-professional staff include those with a Diploma in Librarianship. On the other hand, the non-professionals in the library include those without any formal library training and qualification in librarianship.

== Automation ==
The library operates an automated system using Koha Integrated Library Management Software. It is used for cataloguing and classifying books and journals while most of the routine activities such as registration of users and charging and discharging of library materials are done manually. Bibliographic details of the library collections are held in digitized formats accessible through computer terminals in the main library. The library maintains the Online Public Access Catalogue (OPAC) representing the holdings of the library and its subsidiaries. The OPAC allows library users to know the available resources in the library holdings and this help to save them the stress of having to go through all the shelves before locating a particular information material.

== Major services rendered ==
The library renders numerous services to its users and community. The services rendered in the library include but not limited to reference services, research support services, twenty four hours reading room services during examinations, charging and discharging of library materials, user education/orientation, photocopying service, reference services, user-driven acquisition services, technical services, serials, internet services, Virtual /E-Library services, information retrieval and literature search services, selective dissemination of information/ current awareness services amongst others.

== University Librarians of the Olusegun Oke Library, LAUTECH, ==
List of University Librarians from inception till date at the Olusegun Oke Library, LAUTECH, Ogbomoso.

| Prof. Ebijuwa, Adefunke Sarah (2024 till date) | Dr. Mrs. Aboyade, Modupe Aduke (2019 - 2024) |
Mr. Isaac Olugbenga Ajala (2011 - 2019)
Dr. Gboyega Adio (1997 - 2011)
Dr. J. O. Fasanya (1990 - 1997)

== Library locations ==
Olusegun Oke Library is located at the university's main campus in Ogbomoso North Local Government Area, Oyo State, Nigeria.

Faculty of Engineering and Technology Library

Faculty of Environmental Sciences Library

Faculty of Agricultural Sciences Library

Faculty of Management Sciences Library

Faculty of Pure and Applied Sciences Library

Faculty of Arts and Social Sciences Library

Faculty of Computing and Informatics Library

Faculty of Food and Consumer Sciences Library

Medical Library is located at the College of Health Sciences (Paot), Ogbomoso

Iseyin Campus Library is located at the Faculty of Renewable Natural Resources, Iseyin

== Memorable events ==
The following are memorable events at the Olusegun Oke Library, Ladoke Akintola University of Technology (LAUTECH), Ogbomoso.

On August 14, 2024, Prof. Adefunke Sarah Ebijuwa assumed office as the University Librarian of Ladoke Akintola University of Technology (LAUTECH). She holds the distinction of being the first alumnus of LAUTECH to rise to the position of a Principal Officer and the first indigenous female of the institution to attain this prestigious rank. Her appointment marks a historic milestone in the university’s leadership and academic excellence.

November, 2002 - Library was given a Faculty status by the Development Committee of the University.

May 1999 - The Curriculum Committee of LAUTECH approved LIB 101 (Use of Library) as a unit earning course for 100 Level students.

February 26, 1999 - Olusegun Oke Library moved to the permanent site.

August 27, 1998 - The Medical Library in Osogbo was established.

February 1992 - The University Library was first computerized as the first academic Library in Nigeria.

== See also ==
Academic libraries in Nigeria
