= Chinwe Veronica Anunobi =

Nigerian librarian and CEO of National Library of Nigeria

- Education: University of Nigeria, Nsukka (B.Ed); Imo State University (MLS); University of Nigeria Nsukka (Ph.D)
- Occupation: Librarian
- Organization: National Library of Nigeria
- Predecessor: Lenrie Olatokunbo Aina
- Spouse: Sonny Anunobi
- Children: 4

Chinwe Veronica Anunobi is a Nigerian professor of library and information sciences and the chief executive officer of the National Library of Nigeria.

== Early life and education ==
Anunobi holds a bachelor's degree in Biology (Education) from the University of Nigeria, Nsukka, in 1992. She furthered her education with a Master of Library Science (MLS) degree in 1997 from Imo State University, Owerri, consolidating her foundation in library science. In 2006, she attained her Ph.D. in Library & Information Science from University of Nigeria, Nsukka. She is also a graduate of Galilee International Management Institute (GIMI) Israel.

== Career ==
On 2 September 2021, Anunobi was appointed as the chief executive officer of the National Library of Nigeria by the former President of Nigeria Muhammadu Buhari. Before her appointment as the CEO of the National Library of Nigeria, she served as University Librarian for the Federal University of Technology Owerri, Nigeria, where she pioneered the establishment of ICT unit, Electronic Thesis & Dissertation system, and university library automation. She also served as a digital Librarian at Nnamdi Azikiwe University Awka, Nigeria and pioneered the establishment of Digital library in the university. Chinwe Anunobi played a crucial role in the formation of aspiring LIS professionals in ICT application in libraries.

Anunobi is a member of the Governing Council of African Library and Information Associations and Institutions (AfLIA) where she represents the entire West African region on board of the organisation. She is also a chartered member of the Nigerian Library Association and an Associate of the Mortenson Center for International Library Program, University of Illinois. She is an expert in digital library development and management and open Educational Resources with over 70 publications in national and international journals. Noteworthy among these is her chapter titled 'Technology Librarian in a Developing Country,' featured in the book A Day in the Life: Career Options in Library and Information Science, and her contribution to IFLA Publication 139, "Strategies for Regenerating the Information Professions."

== Personal life ==
Anunobi is married to Sonny Anunobi, and has four children.
