= Doris Bozimo =

Nigerian academic and librarian

Doris Oritse Wenyimi Bozimo

Professor

Personal details
- Born: Doris Oritse Wenyimi Bozimo; 16 August 1942 (age 83) Warri, Delta State, Nigeria
- Education: Scripps College; Columbia University
- Profession: Librarian

Doris Bozimo (born 16 August 1942) is a Nigerian librarian, academician and administrator. She is a professor and former university librarian at Kashim Ibrahim Library, Ahmadu Bello University in Zaria, Kaduna state. She was the country coordinator representing Nigeria at Electronic Information for Libraries (EIFL) as well as a member of the Nigerian Library Association.

== Education ==
Bozimo earned a Bachelor of Arts degree from Scripps College in Claremont, California. She completed her master's and doctoral degrees at Columbia University in New York, obtaining them 1967 and 1979 respectively.

== Career ==
In librarianship, Bozimo's career spanned several decades. She was Head of the Department of Library & Information Science from 1991 to 1995. She became Dean of the Faculty of Education in 1996. Bozimo later served as University Librarian at Ahmadu Bello University in Zaria from 2001 to 2006. Bozimo has participated in many professional organizations, including the National Association of Library and Information Science. She has also been a patron of the Nigerian Association of Women Academics' Zaria branch.

== Academic publications ==
- Bozimo, D. O. (1983). Nigerian university libraries: a survey of the expressed library needs of academics as a basis for co-operative planning. Journal of Librarianship, 15(2), 123–135. https://doi.org/10.1177/096100068301500203
- Bozimo, D. O. (1983). Paraprofessional to professional status: one assessment of the ‘ladder principle. Education for Information, vol. 1, no. 4, pp. 335-344. doi:10.3233/EFI-1983-1403
- Bozimo, D. O. (1983). (1983). Nigerian scientific serial literature, International Library Review, 15:1, 49-60, doi:10.1016/0020-7837(83)90067-5
- Obuh, Alex Ozoemelem, & Bozimo, Doris O. (2012). Awareness and Use of Open Access Scholarly Publications by LIS Lecturers in Southern Nigeria. International Journal of Library Science, 1(4), 54- 60.
- Blessing Amina Akporhonor Ph.D and Doris O. Bozimo Ph.D (2011) Automation In Records Management In University Libraries In Nigeria. The Information Technologist. https://www.ajol.info/index.php/ict/article/view/77341 Vol.8 Pages: Pp 1-7

== See also ==
- Kashim Ibrahim Library
- Ahmadu Bello University
