= Kashim Ibrahim University =

University in Maiduguri, Nigeria

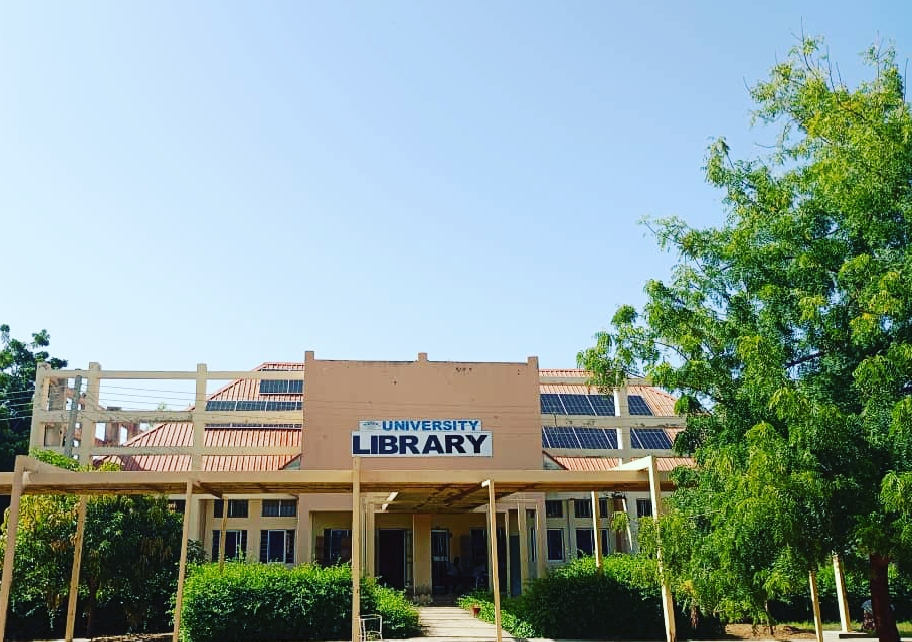
- Motto: العلم ليس له حدود Arabic
- Motto in English: knowledge has no boundary
- Type: Public
- Established: 2016
- Chancellor: Ooni of Ife, Oba Adeyeye Enitan Ogunwusi
- Vice-Chancellor: Prof. Babagana Gutti
- Location: Maiduguri, Borno State, Nigeria; 11.8488°N 13.0040°E
- Website: Official website

Kashim Ibrahim University formerly Borno State University is Borno State government-owned university located in Maiduguri, northeast Nigeria. It was established in 2016. It has five faculties with over 20 departments. The pioneer vice chancellor of the university is Prof. Umar Kyari Sandabe. In June 2021, the university's senate building was inaugurated by Muhammadu Buhari, the president of Nigeria. In October 2024, Prof. Babagana Gutti was appointed as the new Vice-Chancellor.

In January 2025, Gov. Babagana Zulum of Borno State approved the renaming of the institution to Kashim Ibrahim University, Maiduguri, to honour the first Northern Nigeria's first Governor, Sir Kashim Ibrahim.

== Mission ==
Mission of the Borno State University is to provide excellent, modem, free and dynamic environment and adequate facilities, conducive for training and research through its programs for students to acquire the right type of knowledge and skill of good quality that would enable them to be self- employable and that are relevant to the transformation and accelerated development of Borno State, Nigeria

== Faculties ==
- Faculty of Social and Management Sciences
- Faculty of Agriculture
- Faculty of Arts and Education
- Faculty of Sciences
- College of Medical and Health Sciences

== Courses ==
Courses offered in the University include the following:

- Accounting
- Agriculture
- Animal and Environmental Biology
- Biotechnology
- Business Administration
- Chemistry
- Computer science
- Criminology and Security Studies
- Economics
- Education and Biology
- Education and Chemistry
- Education and Computer Science
- Education and Economics
- Education and English Language
- Education and Islamic Studies
- Education and Mathematics
- Education and Physics
- Educational Management
- English Language
- Geography
- Guidance and Counselling
- Islamic Studies
- Literature in English
- Mass Communication
- Mathematics
- Peace Studies and Conflict Resolution
- Physics
- Plant Science and Biotechnology
- Political Science
- Public administration
- Sociology
- Statistics
- Teacher Education Science
- Radiography
- Medical laboratory science
- Physiotherapy
- Medicine and surgery
- Nursing

== Gallery ==
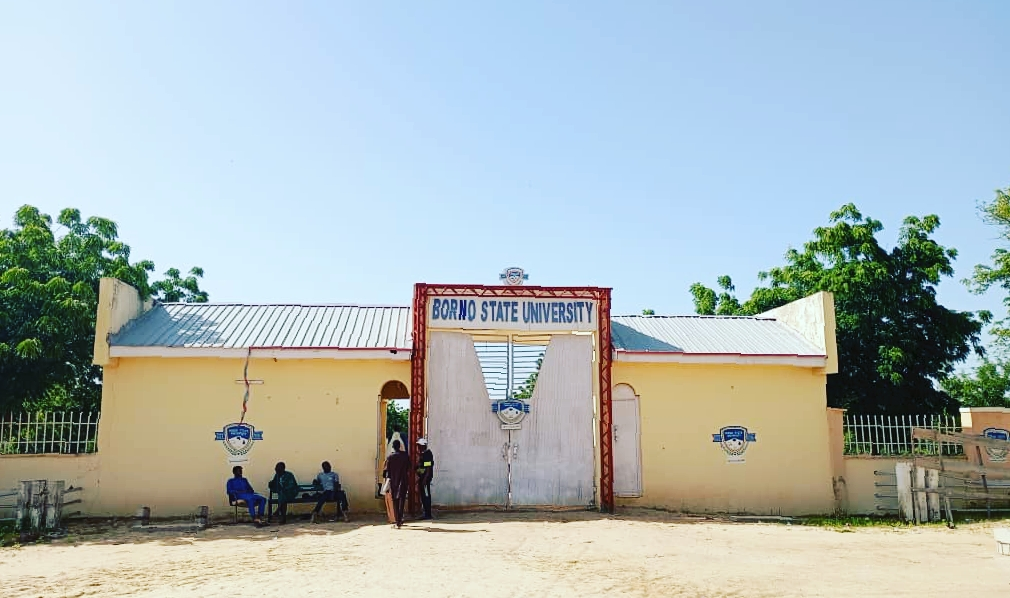
Borno State Gate

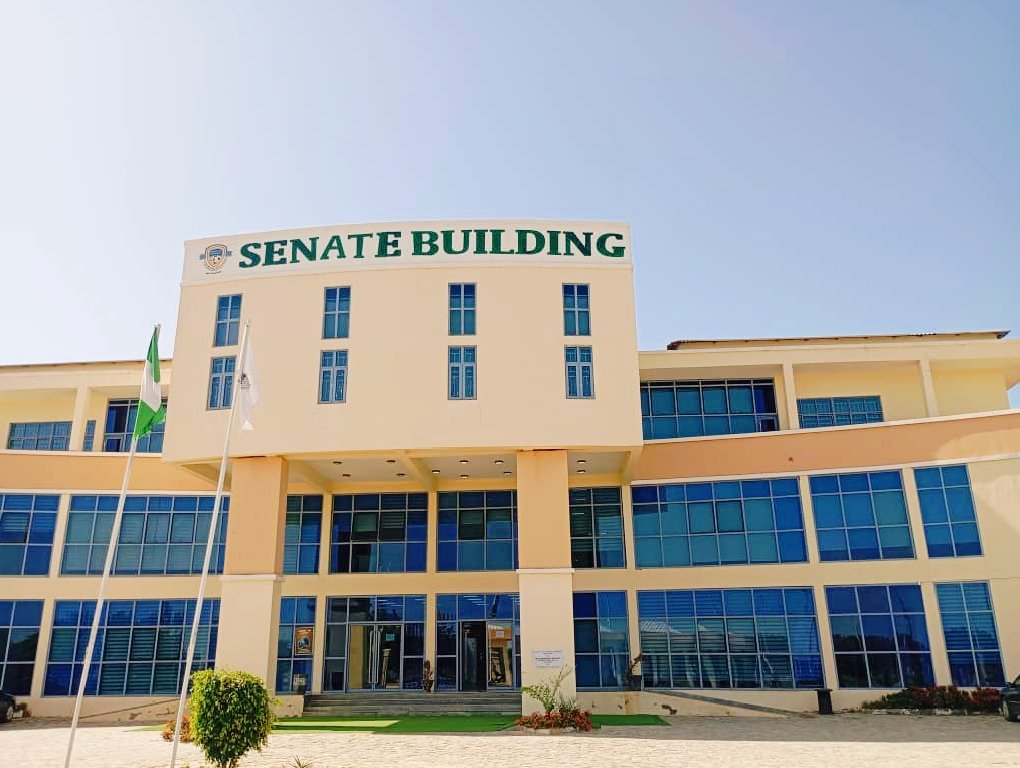
BSU Senate Building

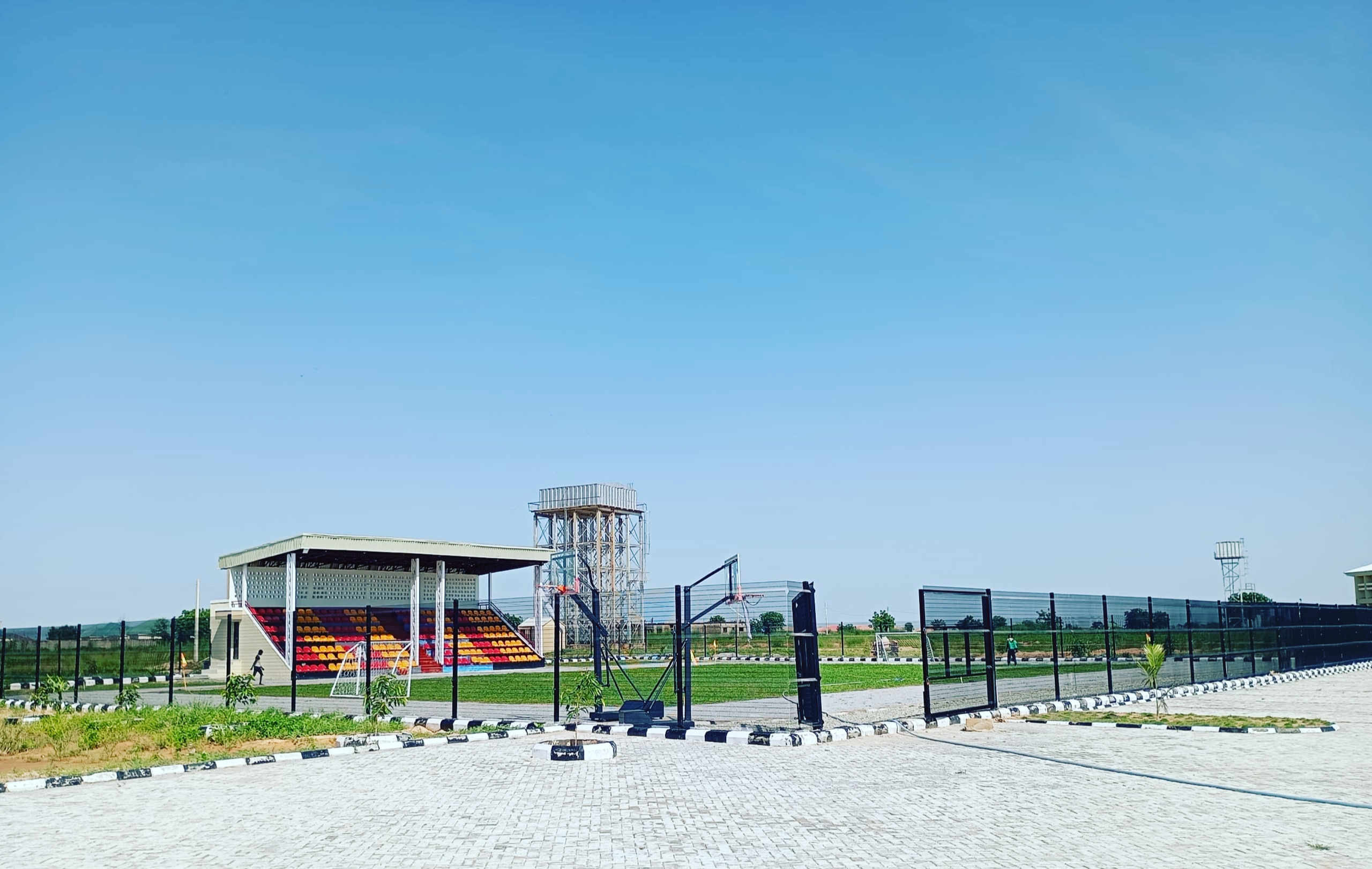
Football field

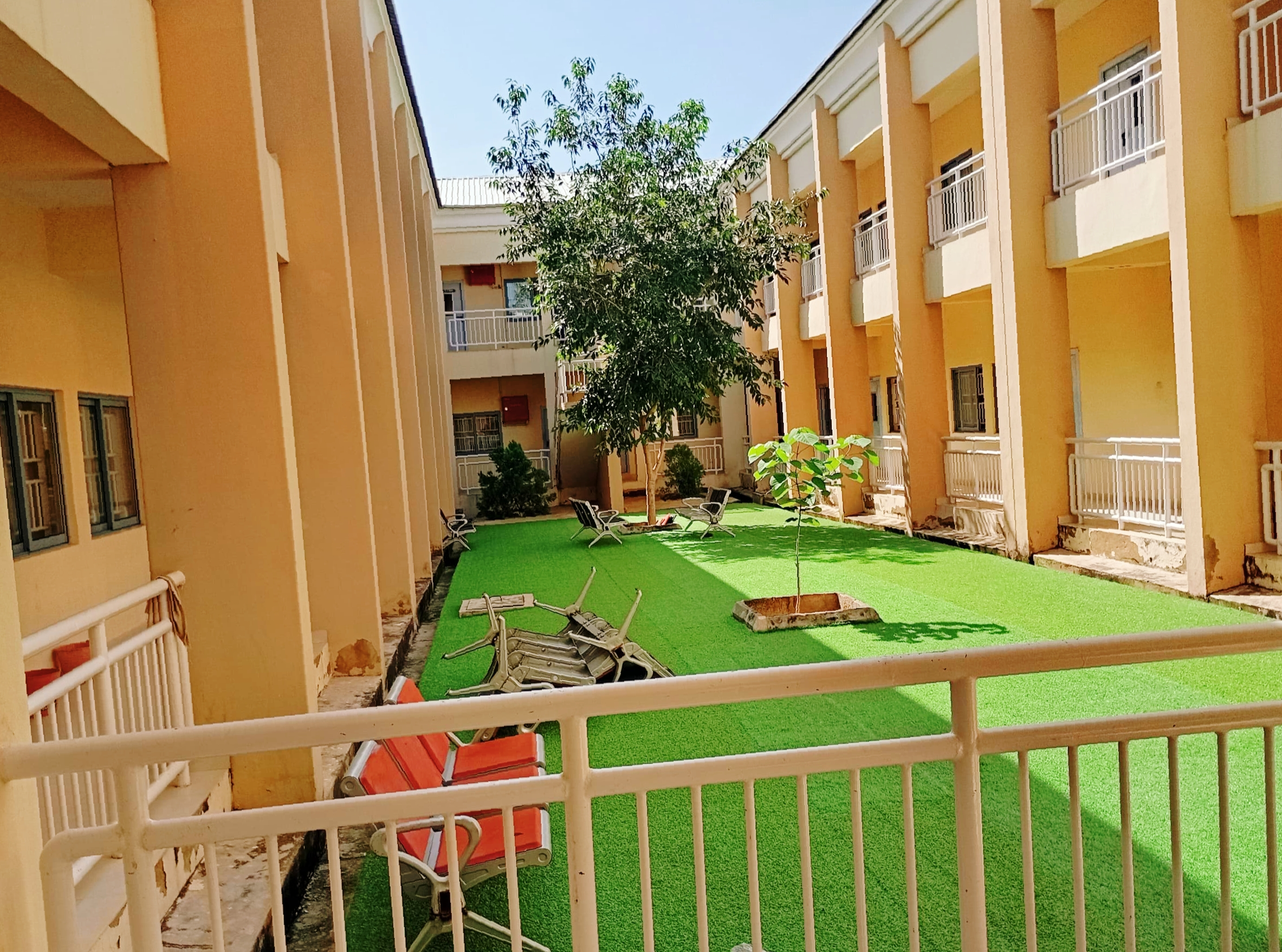
Lectures Hall

== See also ==
Academic libraries in Nigeria
