= Abubakar Tafawa Balewa University Library =

Academic library in Bauchi, Nigeria

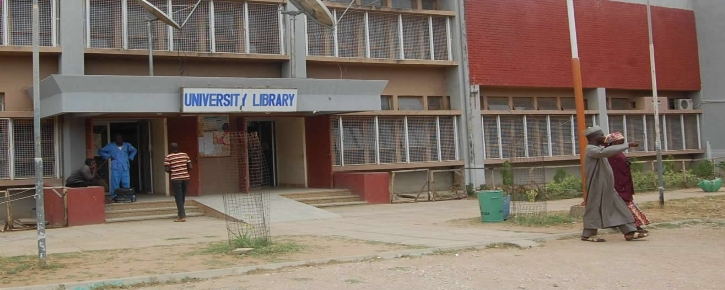
- Front view of Abubakar Tafawa Balewa University Library
- 10°28′8″N 9°49′49″E
- Location: Abubakar Tafawa Balewa University Main campus along Kano road, Bauchi., Nigeria
- Type: Academic library
- Established: 1981

Collection
- Items collected: Books, journals, newspapers, magazines, sound and music recordings, patents, databases, maps, stamps, prints, drawings and manuscripts

Access and use
- Access requirements: Open to students, researchers, academic and non-academic staff of the institution

Other information
- Affiliation: Abubakar Tafawa Balewa University
- Website: https://portal.atbu.edu.ng/library/

The Abubakar Tafawa Balewa University library was established in August 1981 and it currently supplies 71,415 books, references, journals and dissertation to staffs and students of Abubakar Tafawa Balewa University.

== History ==
The library was established in August 1980. The old building converted from female hostel was moved to a bigger building in 1985 which was launched in November 1990 during the university's first convocation ceremony, during the launch, there were 25,000 volumes of books and 25 personal computers in the library. In 2015, 45 additional wireless desktops were added to the digital section of the library.

== Structure ==
The library is made up of the librarian office, Technical services with the reader's service division been the largest. There is E-library within the main library, other courses and programmes also have their library within the premises of the institution. In 2021, National Insurance Commission donated an E-library with 50 people capacity to Abubakar Tafawa Balewa University to promote knowledge acquisition and research work.

== Information Resource ==
The library has information resources both physical and online resources such as online database. The library has 161,672 volumes journal titles of over 3,442 volumes. the virtual library has 25 computers and access to online resources such as HINARI, AGTORA and ESBCO HOST etc.

== Hours ==
- Monday to Friday time: 8.00am - 10.00pm
- Saturday time: 8.00am - 4.00pm
- Sunday time: 2.00p - 8.00pm. the university closed on public holidays.

== Library Academic Staff ==
- Dr Dauda Bakum Adamu - Ag University Librarian
- Dr Ishaya Dauda Marama - Deputy University Librarian
- Hamza Mohammed - Deputy University Librarian
- Umar Faruk Aliyu - Deputy University Librarian
- Altine B. Yusuf - Deputy University Librarian
- Dr Rabi C. Bantai - Reader Services Librarian
- Patrick Ozoulo - Medical College Librarian
- Dr Basaka Abubakar Aminu - Acquisitions Librarian
- Jamilu Abdullahi - Electronic Resources Librarian
- Fatima Binta Umar - Circulation Librarian
- Ishaku Adamu - Cataloging Librarian

== See also ==
- Abubakar Tafawa Balewa University
- List of libraries in Nigeria
- University of Ibadan
