= University of Lagos Library =

Main Academic library of the University of Lagos, Akoka-Yaba, Lagos State

Coordinates: 6.522719°N 3.400635°E

- Formation: 1962
- Headquarters: Main Campus, Akoka
- University Librarian: Prof Yetunde Zaid
- Website: https://library.unilag.edu.ng/

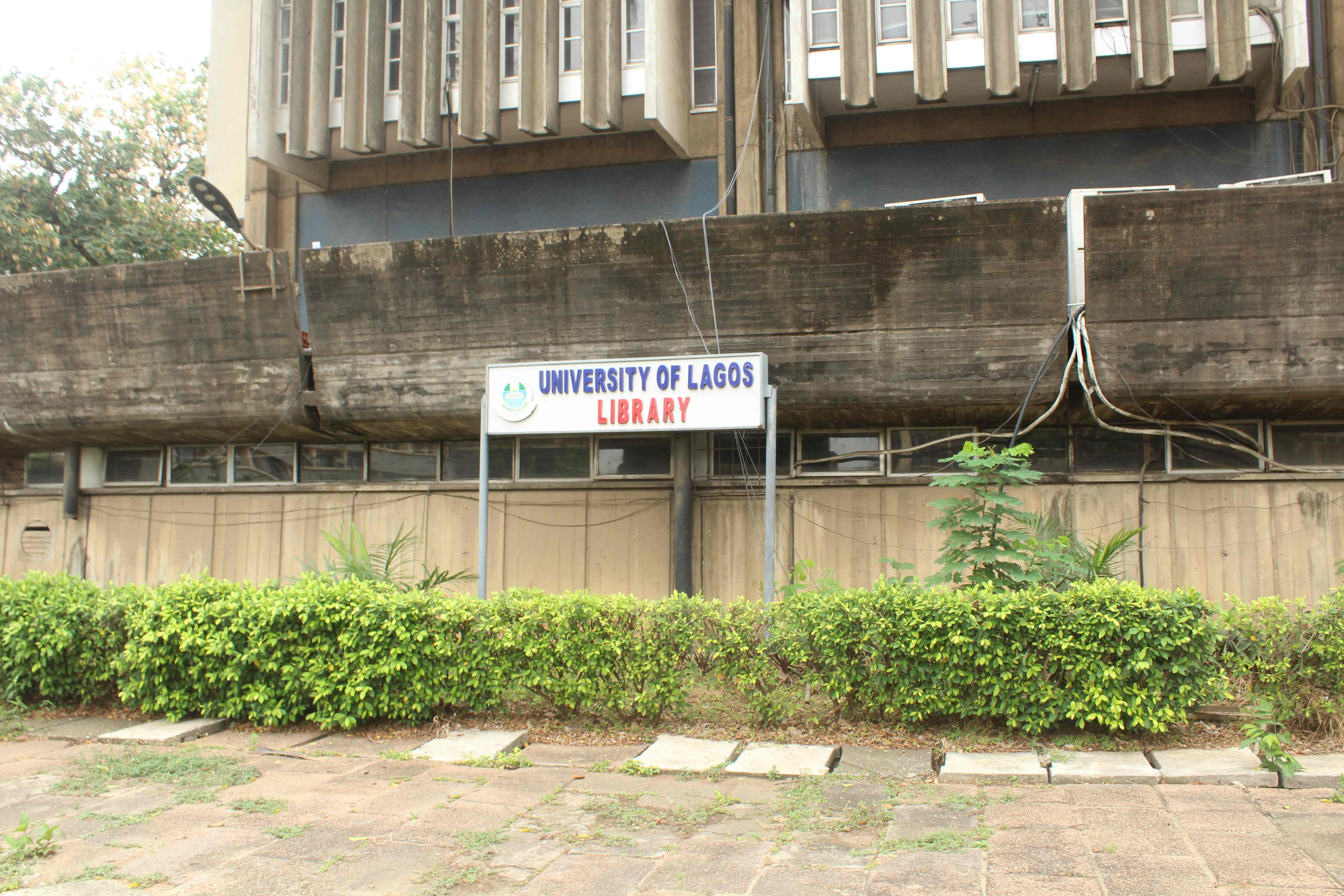
(Photo-walk Nigeria), UNILAG library,

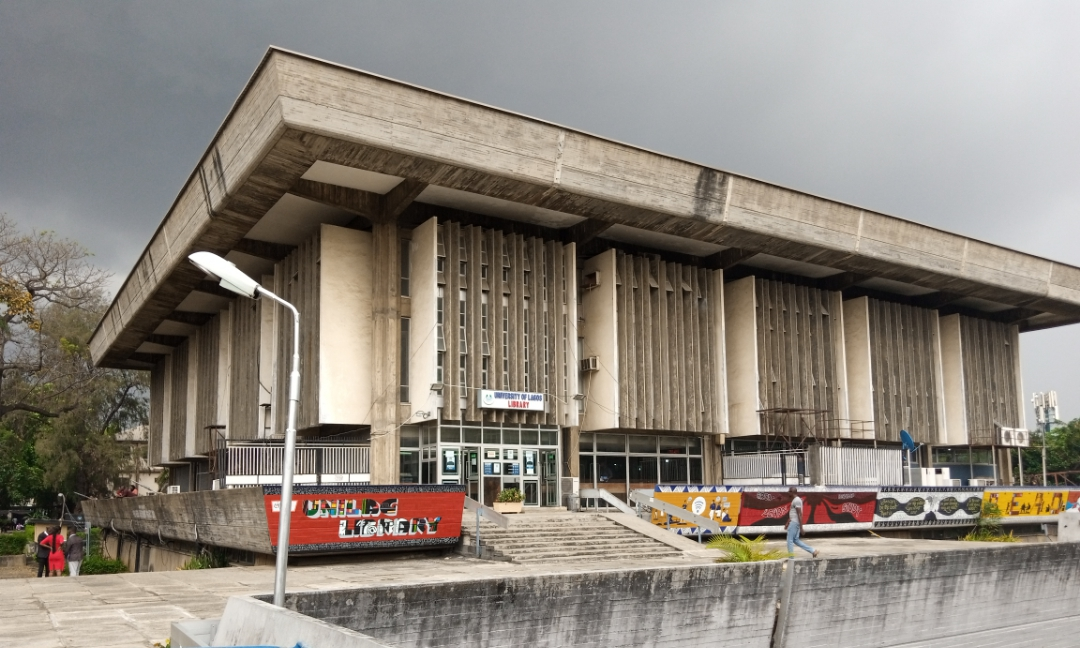
University Library, University of Lagos

The University of Lagos Library is the hub for academic work in the university. All academic related functions such as teaching, research, and learning find their support base in the library where all types of documents, are categorized for easy access to members of the university community. The main library was established in 1962 saddled with the responsibility of complementing the teaching, learning, and research of the institution headed by Professor Olatokunbo Christopher Okiki succeeding Professor Yetunde Abosede Zaid. The library moved to its present permanent site in Akoka Yaba, in September 1965. Other prominent (branch) libraries include the Education library, Taslim Olawale Elias library, etc.

== History ==
The library first started on the third floor of a former secondary school building which then temporarily housed the university at Idi-Araba while a plan for the building of the university permanent site at the North East of Yaba Adjoining the Lagoon was accelerated. The temporary accommodation was used till August 1965 when the library moved to its present building. The building was centrally air-conditioned. It was also designed to have a bindery, photocopying unit, audio-visual section, lecture theatre, and other basic facilities expected in a university library of the best standard. The first University Librarian was Miss Elizabeth M. Moys. She held the office from 1963 to 1965. She began the development of the library collections with the active collaboration of some academic staff. Materials on reference and another subject to support the teaching and research efforts of the academic community were acquired.

The Indian Merchants Association of Lagos later donated some money and grant–in-aid for the establishment of the Gandhi Memorial Research Library which is now popularly called Gandhi Library. Other senior members of the library staff who worked with Miss Moys, the university librarian at the early stage, include Mr. B.A. Amaechi, Mrs. P. Shoyinka, Mr. C.C. Momoh, Mr. S.A. Orimoloye, Mr. H.A Odetoyinbo, Mr. A. Nitechi and others.

The university crisis of 1965 affected the various units of the university and the library was no exception. Many members of the library staff, including Miss Moys resigned. Mr. B.B. Bankole took over the mantle of leadership as the acting university librarian and his appointment was later confirmed. By September 1963, the university library had acquired 12,121 volumes and 300 bound materials were added through the fund provided by UNESCO mission working in the Engineering faculty and the selection by library staff. The library collections reach 100,000 volumes of books by 1971.

The library's present building consists of three stories and an underground floor, a total floor area of 63, 360 square feet, with a capacity to hold over 250,000 volumes and seat 800 readers.

== Organizational chart ==
The university librarian heads the library and is responsible to the vice chancellor for the day-to-day running of the library. For ease management and narrower but reasonable span of control, the internal administrative structure is organized into eight major departments. They are as follows:

University Librarian's Office (Administration)

Reader's services Department

Acquisitions Section

Serials Section

Automation/Institutional Repository Laboratory

Gandhi Library

Gift and Exchange/Bindery

== Chronology of University Librarian ==
- Prof. Olatokunbo Christopher Okiki (2025 – )
- Prof. Yetunde Zaid (2019 - 2025)
- Dr (Mrs.) Fadehan Olukemi Adebimpe (2013 - 2019)

== Location of Faculty Libraries ==
Faculty libraries are established to complement the university library's collection in the provision of effective library services. Library collections are developed in line with the curriculum of study of each faculty and all collections are arranged by the Library of Congress Classification Scheme.

- Faculty of Arts Library
- Faculty of Business Administration Library
- Faculty of Education Library
- Faculty of Engineering Library
- Faculty of Environmental Sciences Library
- Faculty of Law - Law Library
- Faculty of Pharmacy Library
- Faculty of Science Library
- Faculty of Social Sciences Library
- College of Medicine Library

All the faculty libraries are domicile within the premises of the faculty except the Faculty of Law Library which is situated on the ground floor of the University Library building.

== Collections ==
The library has built up over the years a fine and comprehensive collection of research and teaching materials in all major field of knowledge, in support of the university's teaching and research programme. The library's collection includes over 500,000 accessioned volumes of books (500,553 collection as of 24 November 2015), 30,000 periodicals and impressive stocks of rare books, prints and archives. Under the Lagos State Publication Law, cap.107 of 1973, the university library became a legal deposition of two copies of every book that is published in Lagos State. The library is also a depository for the publications of United Nations Economic Commission for Africa (E.C.A); General Agreement on Tariffs and Trade (G.A.T.T), International court of Justice (I.C.J.); and International Labour Organization (I.L.O). It also has standing orders for selected publications of United National Education, Scientific and cultural organization (UNESCO); Word Health Organization (WHO) and Food and Agricultural Organization (F.A.O). All these are arranged by the library of congress classification scheme.

The library also offers access to extensive electronic resources some of which include: ScienceDirect, Emerald Insight, Research4Life, LexisNexis, Proquest, JSTOR. The library's collections can be accessed through the Online Public Access Catalogue (OPAC) system with workstation located within the library and mobile gadgets. The main library coordinates from the various campuses a large number of libraries attached to the various schools, institutions, faculties and department of the university, most of which are autonomous.

== Services ==
The library renders services to its user community and access is equally granted to non-registered members through special needs. The services include but not limited to research support services, reference services, selective dissemination of information, current awareness services, wireless access point, reprographic services, bindery services, online reference services, etc. It is also worthy of note that the library uses NewGenLib integrated library management system to automate her services so as to ensure smooth service delivery.

=== Others includes ===
- University of Lagos Library provides 24-hour reading services in the library most especially when preparing for examinations.
- Loan services - is an important library service accessible at the Circulation Section of the library to all registered users. The service is of two basic types: short-term loan and long-term loan.

Short-term

- Laptop loan services - is a fee-based service that allows a user to borrow a notebook system for use within the library for word processing activities and Internet surfing.
- Reserved Book Room services - collections such as books, periodicals, past examination papers that are heavily consulted are placed on closed access in the Reserved Book Room at the request of the teaching staff for students use and are available for loan to users for periods of two to four hours a time.

Long-term

- Book loan service - allows users to borrow books from the library for home reading.
- Photocopy services: There are commercial photocopying services available to all users within the library at a fee.
- Book binding services
