= Kashim Ibrahim Library =

Ahmadu Bello University Library

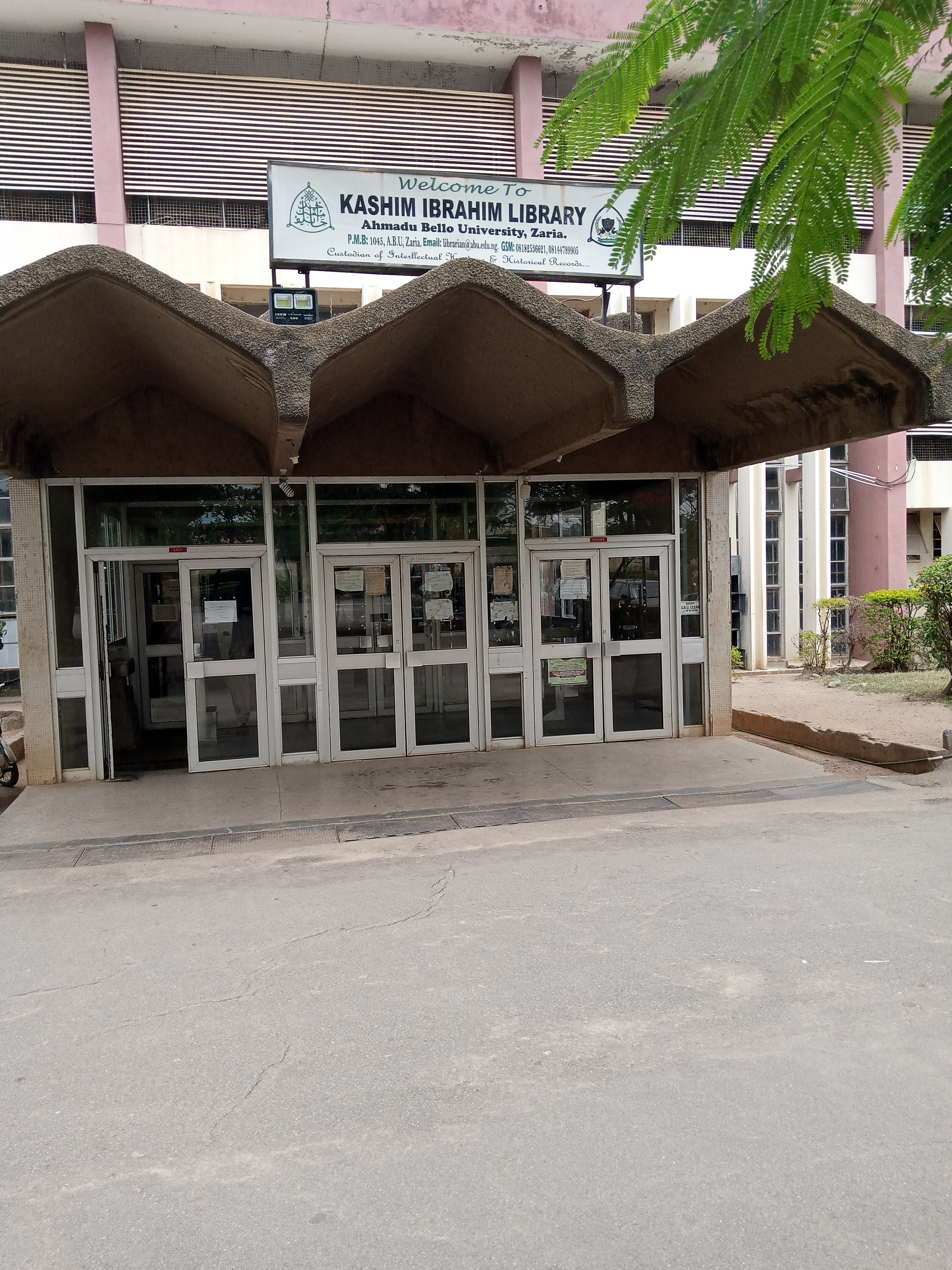
- Front view of Kashim Ibrahim Library
- 7.1260°N 3.3647°E
- Location: Ahmadu Bello University; Zaria, Kaduna, Nigeria
- Type: Academic library
- Established: 1962

Collection
- Items collected: Books, journals, newspapers, magazines, sound and music recordings, patents, databases, maps, stamps, prints, drawings and manuscripts

Access and use
- Access requirements: Open to students, researchers, academic and non-academic staff of the institution

Other information
- Website: library.abu.edu.ng

Kashim Ibrahim Library is one of Africa's biggest academic libraries, located on the main campus of Ahmadu Bello University in Zaria, Nigeria. It is one of the Nigerian first-generation libraries commonly referred to as K.I.L. by the Abusites.

The library is one of the oldest academic research centers in Nigeria in terms of good facilities, stable internet connection, and access to an E-Library. The university librarian is Professor Doris Bozimo.

== History ==
The Library was established in 1955 for the Nigerian College of Arts, Science and Technology, Zaria Branch with a bigger complex built in 1963 The present library building was formally opened on the 10th of December 1976, by Alhaji Sir Kashim Ibrahim, after whom it is named. The Library was built on an area of 13,000 square meters, which contains 500,000 volumes of books and 6,350 periodical titles. The university library has always been at the center of research and scholarship playing a major role in acquiring, processing, and lending library materials and responding to patrons' inquiries with over 2000 readers capacity at a time. The library management during time were Khalil Mahmud as the university librarian and Sam E. Ifidon was appointed as the Deputy University Librarian. few years has been striving to upgrade the IT skills of the staff to enable them to cope with the challenges of the information age. Recently, thanks mostly to donations by the MacArthur Foundation and the Carnegie Corporation, rapid progress has been made not only in updating the collection but also in automating the resources and services of the Library system.

Today, online and CD-ROM searches are a common feature among staff and students of the university. With a staff strength of 42 professionals and 109 paraprofessionals, 22 senior and 102 junior non-professional staff in the entire university library system, the library management is striving to upgrade the IT skills of the staff to enable them to cope with the challenges of the information age.

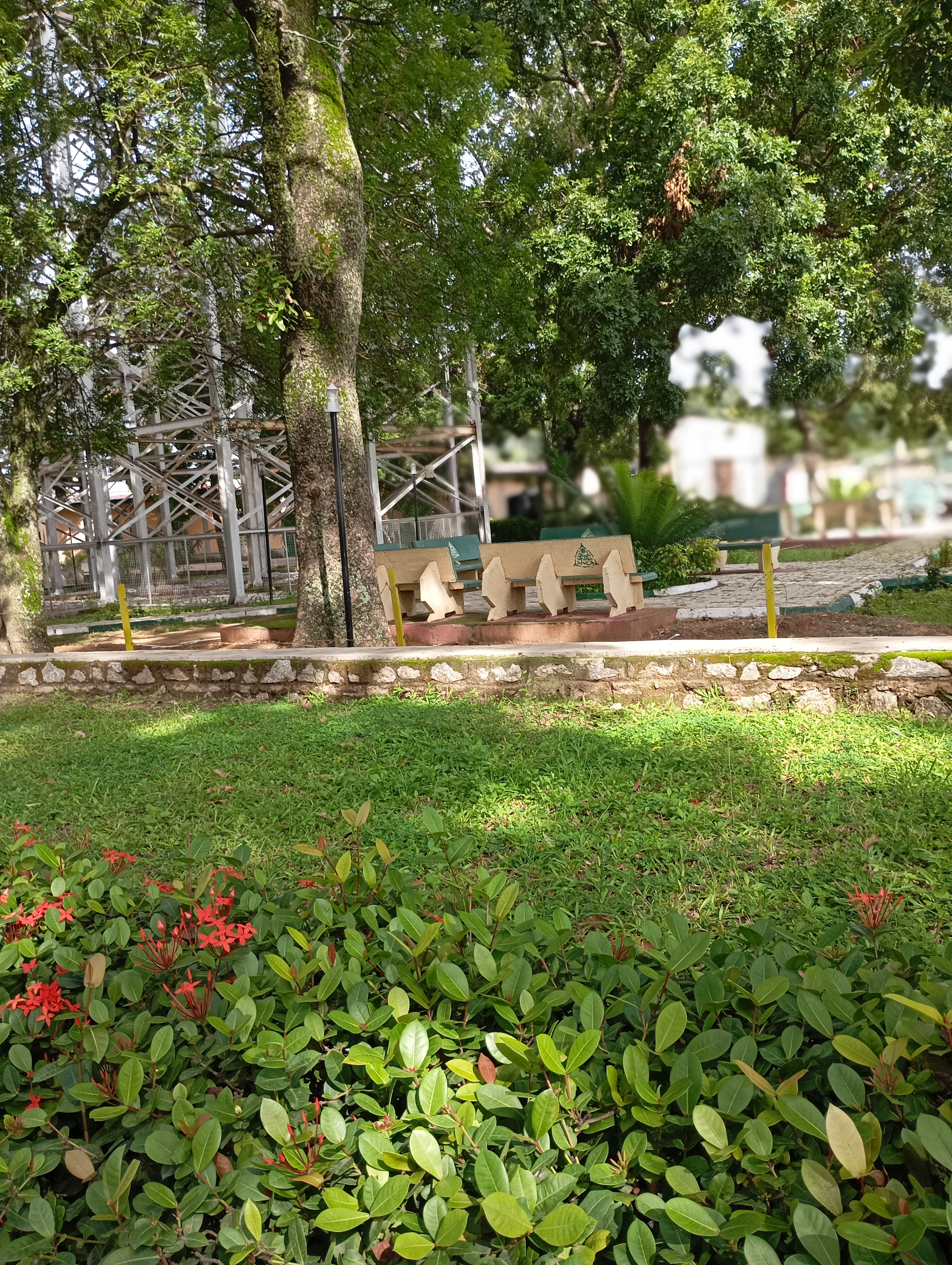
Ahmadu Bello University Zaria main Gate to Kashim Ibrahim Library

== Structure of the Kashim Ibrahim Library Complex ==
The structure of the main library is a three-storey building located on the main campus, Samaru. The building comprises dozens of offices, departments, sections, and units. These house the various administrative, financial, technical, and other staff, as well as resource repositories and others. It is made up of different departments and offices. The library has specialized divisions like a serial section, Reference section, CD-ROMS Search Room, Media division, Reserved Books Unit, and Casual Reading parlor. The Complex also has under it several special satellite libraries or branches found in various sections of the University, in the Main Campus, Kongo Campus, Teaching Hospital, and other Centers and Divisions of the University, including those outside Zaria, like the SBRS Funtua, Arewa House, Kaduna.

Lastly, the Complex also has departmental and faculty satellite libraries in almost every department and faculty in all the Campuses and sub-divisions of the University. These are also generally set up in such a way as to reflect the needs of the specific departmental staff and students, based on the fields of study found there.

== Collections ==
The library has total holdings of over 1.2 million volumes of books and 66,000 periodical titles, with collections for arts and social sciences located on the first floor, while those for physical sciences, medicine, and engineering are found on the second floor. The Library has several sections that house all the collections which are as follows:

- Human Resource Development
- Information Resource Development
- Information Resource Processing
- Serial Management divisions
- Media public relations division
- Information and Communication Technology (ICT) Division
- Customers Service Division
- Research and Bibliographic Services

== Satellite libraries ==
Kashim Ibrahim Library has satellite libraries that support teaching, learning, and research, which are as follows:

- Agricultural Library, now called J. Y Yayock Agricultural Library in Institute of Agricultural Research at Samaru, provides information Resources in agriculture scalence.
- Arewa House Library, Center for Historical Research and Documentation, Ahmadu Bello University, Kaduna
- Medical Library for Faculty of Medicine which is situated in the Institute of Health.
- Lee T. Railsback Library serves the faculty of Veterinary medicine and Pharmaceutical Science.
- President Kennedy Library at the Kongo campus that serves the faculty of administration.
- Law Library serves the faculty of law at the Kongo campus
- Centre for Islamic Legal Studies Library at Kongo campus
- National Animal Production Research institute (NAPRI)
- Center for Historical Research and documentation, Arewa House Library, A.B.U, Kaduna

== See also ==
- Kanuri people
- List of libraries in Nigeria
- List of academic libraries
