= List of academic libraries in Nigeria =

The development of academic libraries in Nigeria can be traced back to pre-independence period when the University of Ibadan and its library were established in 1948. Academic libraries are set up to support learning, teaching and research in tertiary institutions. They also feature prominently in curriculum development of the various departments of their parent institutions. Academic libraries can be categorised mainly as: universities, polytechnics, colleges of education and school of nursing libraries.

== University libraries ==
In Nigeria, there are 43 libraries established in federal universities, 48 libraries founded in state owned universities and 79 libraries founded in private universities.

The list of university libraries in Nigeria are:

=== Federal universities ===
S/N	Name	Website	Year	State	Region
1	Abubakar Tafawa Balewa, Bauchi University Library	http://portal.atbu.edu.ng/library/	1988	Bauchi	North-East
2	Kashim Ibrahim Library, Ahmadu Bello University, Zaria	https://library.abu.edu.ng/	1962	Kaduna	North-West
3	Bayero University, Kano	http://library.buk.edu.ng/	1975	Kano	North-west
4	Federal University Gashua, Yobe	https://www.fugashua.edu.ng	2013	Yobe	North-East
5	Federal University of Petroleum Resources, Effurun	https://fupre.edu.ng/library/	2007	Delta	South-South
6	Federal University of Technology, Akure	https://www.futa.edu.ng	1981	Ondo	South West
7	Federal University of Technology, Minna	https://www.futminna.edu.ng	1982	Niger	North-Central
8	Federal University of Technology, Owerri	https://www.futo.edu.ng	1980	Imo	South East
9	Federal University, Dutse, Jigawa State	https://www.fud.edu.ng/	2011	jigawa	North-West
10	Federal University, Dutsin-Ma, Katsina	https://www.fudutsinma.edu.ng	2011	Katsina	North-West
11	University Of Kashere, Gombe State	https://https://fuk.academia.edu/	2011	Gombe	North-East
12	Federal University, Lafia, Nasarawa State	https://www.fulafia.edu.ng	2011	Nasarawa	North-Central
13	Federal University, Lokoja, Kogi State	https://www.fulokoja.edu.ng	2011	Kogi	North-Central
14	Alex Ekwueme University, Ndufu-Alike, Ebonyi State	https://www.funai.edu.ng	2011	Bayelsa	South-South
15	Federal University, Otuoke, Bayelsa	https://www.fuotuoke.edu.ng/	2011	Ebonyi	South-East
16	Federal University, Oye-Ekiti, Ekiti State	https://www.fuoye.edu.ng/	2011	Ekiti	South-West
17	Federal University, Wukari, Taraba State	https://www.fuwukari.edu.ng/	2011	Taraba	North-East
18	Federal University, Birnin Kebbi	https://www.fubk.edu.ng	2013	Kebbi	North-West
19	Federal University, Gusau, Zamfara State	https://www.fugusau.edu.ng	2013	Zamfara	North-West
20	Michael Okpara University of Agricultural Umudike	https://www.mouau.edu.ng	1992	Abia	South East
21	Modibbo Adama University of Technology, Yola	https://www.mautech.edu.ng	1981	Adamawa	North-East
22	National Open University of Nigeria, Lagos	https://www.nou.edu.ng	2002	Lagos	South-West
23	Nigerian Police Academy Wudil	https://polac.edu.ng/	2013	Kano	North-West
24	Nigerian Defence Academy Kaduna	https://www.nda.edu.ng	1985	Kaduna	North-West
25	Nnamdi Azikiwe University, Awka	https://www.unizik.edu.ng	1992	Anambra	South-East
26	Obafemi Awolowo University, Ile-Ife	https://www.oauife.edu.ng	1962	Osun	South-West
27	University of Abuja, Gwagwalada	https://www.uniabuja.edu.ng	1988	Abuja	North-Central
28	Federal University of Agriculture, Abeokuta	https://www.unaab.edu.ng	1988	Ogun	South-West
29	University of Agriculture, Makurdi	https://www.uam.edu.ng	1988	Benue	North-Central
30	John Harris Library	https://library.uniben.edu.ng	1970	Edo	South-South
31	University of Calabar	https://www.unical.edu.ng	1975	Cross River	South-South
32	Kenneth Dike Library, University of Ibadan	http://library.ui.edu.ng/	1948	Oyo	South West
33	University of Ilorin	https://www.unilorin.edu.ng	1975	Kwara	North- Central
34	University of Jos	https://www.unijos.edu.ng	1975	Plateau	North-Central
35	University of Lagos Library	https://library.unilag.edu.ng/	1962	Lagos	South-West
36	University of Maiduguri	https://www.unimaid.edu.ng	1975	Borno	North-East
37	University of Nigeria, Nsukka	https://www.unn.edu.ng	1960	Enugu	South-East
38	University of Port Harcourt	https://www.uniport.edu.ng	1975	Rivers	South-South
39	University of Uyo	https://www.uniuyo.edu.ng	1991	Akwa-Ibom	South-South
40	Usumanu Danfodiyo University	https://www.udusok.edu.ng	1975	Sokoto	North-West
41	Nigerian Maritime University Okerenkoko, Delta State	https://www.nmu.edu.ng/	2018	Delta	South-South
42	Air Force Institute of Technology, Kaduna	https://afit.edu.ng	2018	Kaduna	North-West
43	Nigerian Army University Biu	https://naub.edu.ng/	2018	Borno	North-East

=== State universities ===
S/N	Name	Website	Year	State	Region
1	Abia State University, Uturu	https://www.absu.edu.ng	1981	Abia	Southeast
2	Adamawa State University Mubi	https://www.adsu.edu.ng	2002	Adamawa	North-East
3	Adekunle Ajasin University, Akungba	https://www.aaua.edu.ng	1999	Ondo	South-West
4	Akwa Ibom State University, Ikot Akpaden	https://www.aksu.edu.ng	2010	Akwa-Ibom	South-South
5	Ambrose Alli University Library	1. https://www.aauekpoma.edu.ng 2. Ambrose Alli University Library; =334	1980	Edo	South-South
6	Chukwuemeka Odumegwu Ojukwu University, Uli	https://coou.edu.ng/	2000	Anambra	South-East
7	Bauchi State University, Gadau	https://www.basug.edu.ng	2011	Bauchi	North-East
8	Borno State University, Maiduguri	https://www.bosu.edu.ng/	2016	Borno	North-East
9	Benue State University, Makurdi	https://www.bsum.edu.ng	1992	Benue	North-Central
10	Yobe State University, Damaturu	https://www.ysu.edu.ng	2006	Yobe	North-East
11	Cross River State University of Technology, Calabar	https://www.crutech.edu.ng	2004	Cross River	South-South
12	Delta State University Abraka	https://www.delsu.edu.ng	1992	Delta	South-South
13	Ebonyi State University, Abakaliki	https://www.ebsu.edu.ng	2000	Ebonyi	South-East
14	Ekiti State University	https://www.eksu.edu.ng	1982	Ekiti	South-West
15	Enugu State University of Science and Technology, Enugu	https://www.esut.edu.ng	1982	Enugu	South-East
16	Gombe State University, Gombe	https://www.gsu.edu.ng	2004	Gombe	North-East
17	Ibrahim Badamasi Babangida University, Lapai	https://www.ibbu.edu.ng	2005	Niger	North-Central
18	Ignatius Ajuru University of Education, Rumuolumeni	https://www.iaue.edu.ng	2010	River	South-South
19	Imo State University, Owerri	https://www.imsu.edu.ng	1992	Imo	South-East
20	Sule Lamido University, Kafin Hausa, Jigawa	https://www.slu.edu.ng	2013	Jigawa	North-East
21	Kaduna State University, Kaduna	https://www.kasu.edu.ng	2004	Kaduna	North-West
22	Kano University of Science & Technology, Wudil	https://www.kust.edu.ng	2000	Kano	North-West
23	Kebbi State University of Science and Technology, Aliero	https://www.ksusta.edu.ng	2006	Kebbi	North-West
24	Kogi State University Anyigba	https://www.ksu.edu.ng	1999	Kogi	North-Central
25	Kwara State University, Ilorin	https://www.kwasu.edu.ng	2009	Kwara	North-Central
26	Ladoke Akintola University of Technology, Olusegun Oke Library	https://www.lautech.edu.ng	1990	Oyo	South-West
27	Ondo State University of Science and Technology Okitipupa	https://www.osustech.edu.ng	2008	Ondo	South-West
28	River State University	https://www.rsu.edu.ng	1979	River	South-South
29	Olabisi Onabanjo University, Ago Iwoye	https://www.oouagoiwoye.edu.ng	1982	Ogun	South-West
30	Lagos State University, Fatiu Ademola Akesode Library, Ojo	https://library.lasu.edu.ng/	1983	Lagos	Southwest
31	Niger Delta University Yenagoa	https://www.ndu.edu.ng	2000	Bayelsa	South-South
32	Nasarawa State University Keffi	https://www.nsuk.edu.ng	2002	Nasarawa	North-Central
33	Plateau State University Bokkos	https://www.plasu.edu.ng	2005	Plateau	North-Central
34	Tai Solarin University of Education Ijebu Ode	https://www.tasued.edu.ng	2005	Ogun	South-West
35	Umar Musa Yar' Adua University Katsina	https://www.umyu.edu.ng	2006	Katsina	North-West
36	Osun State University Osogbo	https://www.uniosun.edu.ng	2006	Osun	South-West
37	Taraba State University, Jalingo	https://www.tsuniversity.edu.ng	2008	Taraba	North-East
38	Sokoto State University	https://www.ssu.edu.ng	2009	Sokoto	North-West
39	Yusuf Maitama Sule University Kano	https://www.nwu.edu.ng	2012	Kano	North-Central
40	Oyo State Technical University Ibadan	https://tech-u.edu.ng/	2012	Oyo	South-West
41	Ondo State University of Medical Sciences	https://www.unimed.edu.ng	2015	Ondo	South-West
42	Edo University Iyamo	https://www.edouniversity.edu.ng/	2016	Edo	South-South
43	Eastern Palm University Ogboko, Imo State	https://www.epu.edu.ng/	2016	Imo	South-South
44	University of Africa Toru Orua, Bayelsa State	https://www.uat.edu.ng/public/	2016	Bayelsa	South-South
45	Borno State University, Maiduguri	https://www.bosu.edu.ng/	2016	Borno	North-East
46	Moshood Abiola University of Science and Technology Abeokuta	https://www.mapoly.edu.ng/	2017	Ogun	South-West
47	Gombe State University of Science and Technology	https://www.gsu.edu.ng/	2017	Gombe	North-East
48	Zamfara State University	https://www.zamsut.edu.ng/	2018	Zamfara	North-West
49	Bayelsa Medical University	https://www.bmu.edu.ng/	2019	Bayelsea	South-South

=== Private universities ===
S/N	Name	Website	Year	State	Region
1	Achievers University, Owo	https://www.achievers.edu.ng/academics/library/	2007	Ondo	South-West
2	Adeleke University Library, Ede	https://adelekeuniversity.edu.ng/au-library	2011	Osun	South-West
3	Afe Babalola University, Ado-Ekiti - Ekiti State	https://www.abuad.edu.ng	2009	Ekiti	South-West
4	African University of Science & Technology, Abuja	https://aust.edu.ng	2007	FCT	North-Central
5	Ajayi Crowther University, Ibadan	https://www.acu.edu.ng	2005	Oyo	South-West
6	Al-Hikmah University, Ilorin	https://www.alhikmah.edu.ng	2005	Kwara	North-Central
7	Al-Qalam University, Katsina	https://www.auk.edu.ng	2005	Kastina	North-West
8	American University of Nigeria, Yola	https://www.aun.edu.ng	2003	Yola	North-Central
9	Augustine University	https://www.augustineuniversity.edu.ng/	2015	Lagos	South-West
10	Babcock University, Ilishan-Remo	https://www.babcock.edu.ng	2011	Ogun	South-West
11	Baze University	https://www.bazeuniversity.edu.ng	2011	FCT	North-Central
12	Bells University of Technology, Otta	https://www.bellsuniversity.edu.ng/	2005	Ogun	South-West
13	Benson Idahosa University, Benin City	https://www.biu.edu.ng/	2002	Edo	South-South
14	Bingham University, New Karu	https://www.binghamuni.edu.ng	2005	Nasarawa	North-Central
15	Bowen University, Iwo	https://www.bowenuniversity-edu.org	2001	Osun	South-West
16	Caleb University, Lagos	https://www.calebuniversity.edu.ng	2007	Lagos	South-West
17	Caritas University, Enugu	https://www.caritasuni.edu.ng/	2005	Enugu	South-East
18	Chrisland University	https://www.chrislanduniversity.edu.ng	2015	Ogun	South-West
19	Covenant University Library, Ota	https://clrmain.covenantuniversity.edu.ng/	2002	Ogun	South-West
20	Crawford University Igbesa	https://www.crawforduniversity.edu.ng	2005	Ogun	South-West
21	Crescent University	https://www.crescent-university.edu.ng	2005	Ogun	South-West
22	Edwin Clark University, Kaigbodo	https://www.edwinclarkuniversity.edu.ng/	2015	Delta	South-South
23	Elizade University, Ilara-Mokin	https://www.elizadeuniversity.edu.ng	2012	Ondo	South-West
24	Evangel University, Akaeze	https://www.evangeluniversity.edu.ng	2012	Ebonyi	South-East
25	Fountain University, Oshogbo	https://library.fuo.edu.ng/	2007	Oshogbo	South-West
26	Godfrey Okoye University, Ugwuomu-Nike - Enugu State	https://www.gouni.edu.ng	2009	Enugu	South-East
27	Gregory University, Uturu	https://www.gregoryuniversity.com	2012	Abia	South-East
28	Hallmark University, Ijebi Itele, Ogun	https://www.hallmark.edu.ng	2015	Ogun	South-West
29	Hezekiah University, Umudi	https://hezekiah.edu.ng/	2015	Imo	South-East
30	Igbinedion University Okada	https://www.iuokada.edu.ng	1999	Edo	South-South
31	Joseph Ayo Babalola University, Ipo Arakeji and Ikeji-Arakeji	https://www.jabu.edu.ng	2006	Osun	South-West
32	Kings University, Ode Omu	https://www.kingsuniversity.edu.ng/	2015	Kwara	North-Central
33	Kwararafa University, Wukari	https://www.kwararafauniversity.edu.ng	2005	Taraba	North-East
34	Landmark University, Omu-Aran.	https://www.lmu.edu.ng	2011	Kwara	North-Central
35	Lead City University, Ibadan	https://www.lcu.edu.ng	2005	Oyo	South-West
36	Madonna University, Okija	https://www.madonnauniversity.edu.ng	1999	Anambra	South-East
37	Mcpherson University, Seriki Sotayo, Ajebo	https://www.mcu.edu.ng	2012	Ogun	South-West
38	Micheal & Cecilia Ibru University	https://mciu.edu.ng/	2015	Delta	South-South
39	Mountain Top University	https://library.mtu.edu.ng<	2015	Ogun	South-West
40	Nile University of Nigeria	https://www.nileuniversity.edu.ng/nile-library	2009	FCT	North-Central
41	Novena University, Ogume	https://www.novenauniversity.edu.ng	2005	Delta	South-South
42	Obong University, Obong Ntak	https://www.obonguniversity.net	2007	Akwa-Ibom	South-South
43	Oduduwa University, Ipetumodu - Osun State	https://www.oduduwauniversity.edu.ng	2009	Osun	South-West
44	Pan-Atlantic University, Lagos	https://www.pau.edu.ng	2002	Lagos	South-West
45	Paul University, Awka - Anambra State	https://www.pauluniversity.edu.ng	2009	Anambra	South-East
46	Tekena Tamuno Library (Redeemer's University)	https://run.edu.ng/library	2005	Osun	South-West
47	Renaissance University, Enugu	https://www.rnu.edu.ng	2005	Enugu	South-East
48	Rhema University, Obeama-Asa - Rivers State	https://www.rhemauniversity.edu.ng	2009	Rivers	South-South
49	Ritman University, Ikot Ekpene, Akwa Ibom	https://www.ritmanuniversity.edu.ng	2015	Akwa Ibom	South-South
50	Salem University, Lokoja	https://www.salemuniversity.edu.ng	2007	Kogi	North-Central
51	Samuel Adegboyega University, Ogwa, Edo State	https://www.sau.edu.ng	2011	Edo	South-South
52	Southwestern University, Oku Owa	https://www.southwesternuniversity.edu.ng	2012	Ogun	South-West
53	Summit University	https://www.summituniversity.edu.ng	2015	Kwara	North-Central
54	Tansian University, Umunya	https://tansianuniversity.edu.ng/	2007	Anambra	South-East
55	University of Mkar, Mkar	https://www.unimkar.edu.ng	2005	Benue	North-Central
56	Veritas University, Abuja	https://www.veritas.edu.ng	2007	FCT	North-Central
57	Wellspring University, Evbuobanosa - Edo State	https://www.wellspringuniversity.net	2009	Edo	South-South
58	Wesley University. of Science & Technology, Ondo	https://www.wusto.edu.ng	2007	Ondo	South-West
59	Western Delta University, Oghara Delta State	https://wdu.edu.ng	2007	Delta	South-South
60	Christopher University Mowe	https://www.christopheruniversity.edu.ng/	2015	Ogun	South-West
61	Kola Daisi University Ibadan, Oyo State	https://www.koladaisiuniversity.edu.ng/	2016	Oyo	South-West
62	Anchor University Ayobo Lagos State	https://www.aul.edu.ng/	2016	Lagos	South-West
63	Dominican University Ibadan Oyo State	https://www.dui.edu.ng/	2016	Oyo	South-West
64	Legacy University, Okija Anambra State	https://www.legacyuniversity.edu.ng/	2016	Anambra	South-East
65	Arthur Javis University Akpoyubo Cross river State	https://www.arthurjarvisuniversity.edu.ng/	2016	Cross River	South-South
66	Crown Hill University Eiyenkorin, Kwara State	https://www.crownhilluniversity.edu.ng/	2016	Kwara	North-Central
67	Coal City University Enugu State	https://www.ccu.edu.ng/	2016	Enugu	South-East
68	Clifford University Owerrinta Abia State	https://www.clifforduni.edu.ng/	2016	Abia	South-East
69	Admiralty University of Nigeria, Ibusa Delta State	https://www.adun.edu.ng	2017	Delta	South-South
70	Spiritan University, Nneochi Abia State	https://www.spiritanuniversity.edu.ng	2017	Abia	South-East
71	Precious Cornerstone University, Oyo	https://www.pcu.edu.ng	2017	Oyo	South-West
72	PAMO University of Medical Sciences, Portharcourt	https://www.pums.edu.ng	2017	Portharcourt	South-South
73	Atiba University Oyo	https://www.atibauniversity.edu.ng/	2017	Oyo	South-West
74	Eko University of Medical and Health Sciences Ijanikin, Lagos	https://www.ekounivmed.edu.ng	2017	Lagos	South-West
75	Skyline University, Kano	https://www.sun.edu.ng	2018	Kano	North-West
76	Greenfield University, Kaduna	https://www.gfu.edu.ng	2019	Kaduna	North-West
77	Dominion University Ibadan, Oyo State	https://www.dominionuniversity.edu.ng/	2019	Oyo	South-West
78	Trinity University Ogun State	https://www.trinityuniversity.edu.ng/	2019	Ogun	South-West
79	Westland University Iwo, Osun State	https://www.westland.edu.ng/	2019	Osun	South-West

== Polytechnic libraries ==
Polytechnic libraries are established with the primary goal of providing information resources to students, members of staff of the polytechnic community and other intended users. Apart from the information materials, personal assistance is offered to library users to ensure optimal use of the library. There are 29 Federal Polytechnic Libraries in 29 Federal Polytechnics in Nigeria, 48 State owned polytechnic libraries and 57 privately owned polytechnic libraries in Nigeria.

List of Polytechnic Libraries in Nigeria

	Federal Polytechnic		
S/N	Name	Website	Year
1	Akanu Ibiam Federal Polytechnic Unwana, P.M.B. 1007, Afikpo, Ebonyi State.	www.akanuibiampoly.edu.ng	1981
2	Auchi Polytechnic, Auchi, Edo State	www.auchipoly.edu.ng	1973
3	Federal Polytechnic Ado Ekiti, Ekiti State	www.fedpolyado.edu.ng	1977
4	Federal Polytechnic Bali, Taraba State	www.fedpobali.edu.ng	2007
5	Federal Polytechnic Bauchi, P.M. B 231, Bauchi State	www.fptb.edu.ng	1979
6	Federal Polytechnic Bida, P.M.B 55, Niger State	www.fedpolybida.edu.ng	1977
7	Federal Polytechnic Damaturu, P.M.B 1006, Yobe State	www.fedpodam.edu.ng	1993
8	Federal Polytechnic Ede, Osun State	www.federalpolyede.edu.ng	1992
9	Federal Polytechnic Ekowe, Bayelsa State	www.federalpolyekowe.edu.ng	2007
10	Federal Polytechnic Idah P.M.B 1035, Kogi State	www.fepoda.edu.ng	1977
11	Federal Polytechnic Ilaro, P.M.B 50, Ogun State	www.federalpolyilaro.edu.ng	1979
12	Federal Polytechnic Ile-Oluji, Ondo State	www.fedpolel.edu.ng	2016
13	Federal Polytechnic Kaura Namoda, P.M.B, 1012, Zamfara State	www.fedpolykaura.edu.ng	1983
14	Federal Polytechnic Mubi, PMB 35 Mubi, Adamawa State	www.federalpolytechnicmubi.edu.ng	1979
15	Federal Polytechnic Nasarawa, P.M.B. 01 Nasarawa State	www.fedpolynasarawa.edu.ng	1983
16	Federal Polytechnic Nekede, P.M.B 1036, Owerri, Imo State	www.fpno.edu.ng	1977
17	Federal Polytechnic Offa, P.M.B 420, Kwara State	www.fpo.edu.ng	1992
18	Federal Polytechnic Oko, Anambra State	www.federalpolyoko.edu.ng	1982
19	Federal Polytechnic of Oil and Gas Bonny, Rivers State	www.fedpolybonny.edu.ng	2014
20	Federal Polytechnic Ukana, Akwa Ibom State	https://www.fedpolyukana.edu.ng/	2014
21	Hussaini Adamu Federal Polytechnic, P.M.B 5004, Kazaure Jigawa State	www.hafedpoly.edu.ng	1991
22	Kaduna Polytechnic, Kaduna	www.kadunapolytechnic.edu.ng	1956
23	National Institute of Construction Technology Uromi	www.nict.edu.ng	2014
24	Waziri Umaru Federal Polytechnic, P.M.B. 1034, Birnin Kebbi	www.wufpbk.edu.ng	1976
25	Yaba College of Technology, P.M.B. 2011, Yaba, Lagos State	www.yabatech.edu.ng	1947
26	Airforce Institute of Technology (AFIT), NAF Base Kaduna	www.afit.edu.ng	1977
27	Petroleum Training Institute Effurun P.M.B 20, Effurun. Delta State	www.pti.edu.ng	1972
28	Nigerian Army Institute of Technology and Environmental Science (NAITES) Makurdi	www.naitesmkd.edu.ng	1960
29	Nigerian College of Aviation Technology (NCAT), Sokoto Road, Zaria, Kaduna State	www.ncat.gov.ng	
30	Nigerian Institute of Journalism, 8-14, Ijaiye road Ogba-Ikeja, Lagos state	www.nij.edu.ng	1971
31	Federal Training Center, Ikoyi, Lagos state	https://ftclagos.edu.ng/	1957
32	Taraba state p polytechnic Suntai	https://tarabapoly.edu.ng/	1991

== See also ==
- Academic libraries by country
- Federal University of Technology Owerri (FUTO) Library
- Samuel Adegboyega University Library
- Covenant University Library (Centre for Learning Resources)
- Olusegun Oke Library
