= Cross River State Library =

Public library in Calabar, Nigeria

Coordinates: 4.96308°N 8.32911°E

Cross state Library
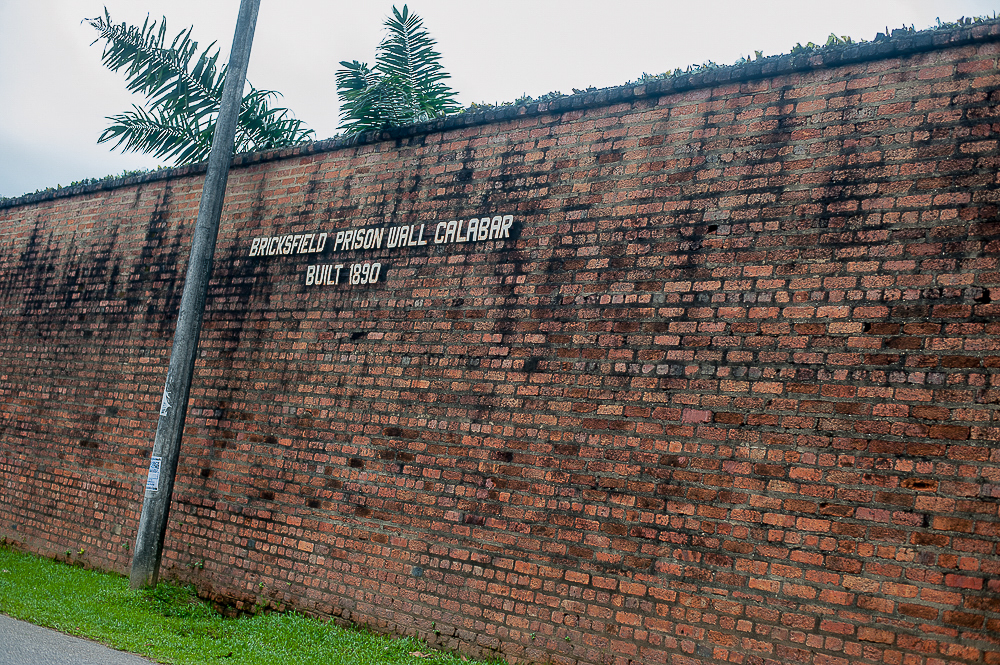
- Location: Calabar, Nigeria
- Established: 1890

Collection
- Size: 4000

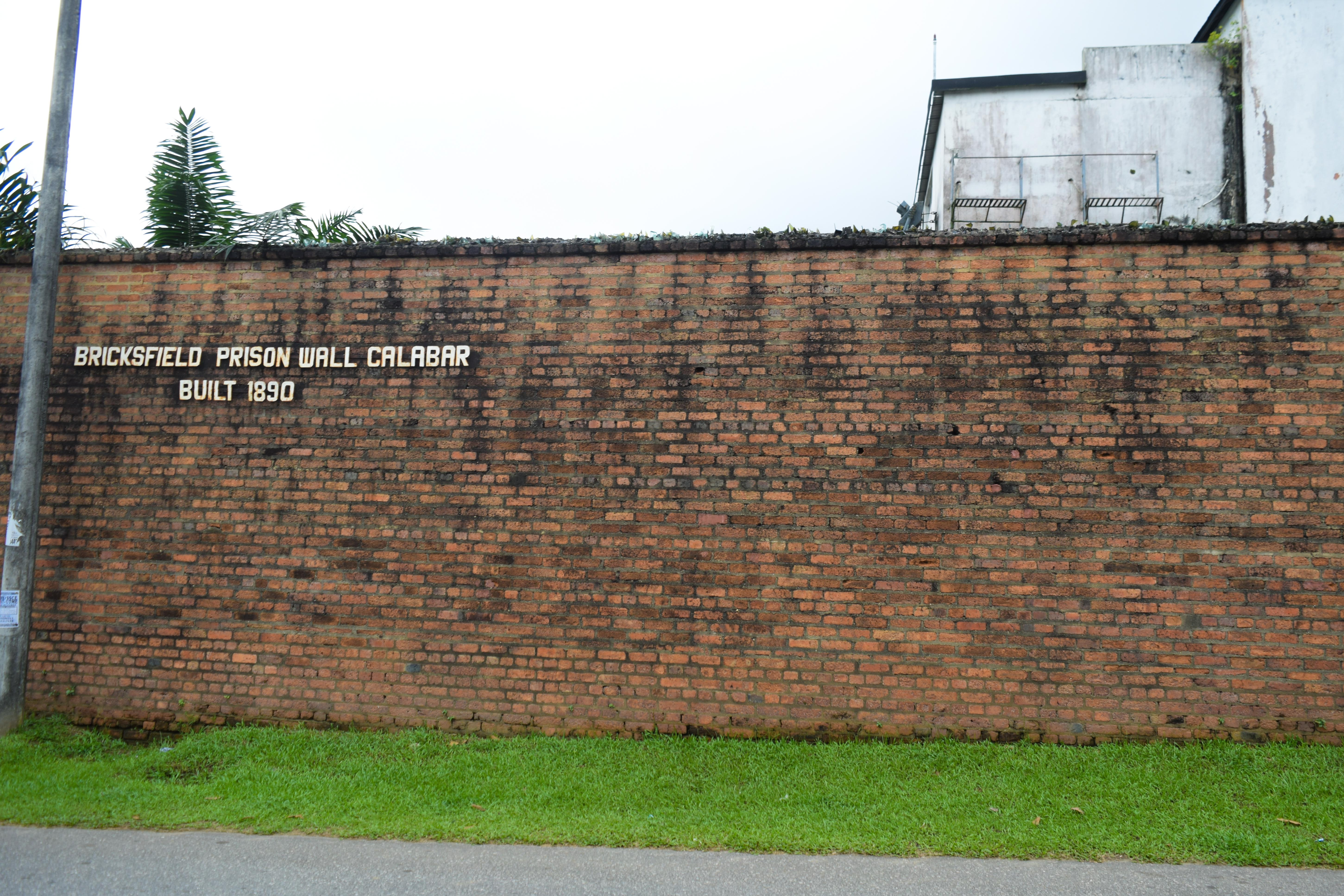
The Bricksfield Prison Wall, part of the Cross River State Library's structure

The Cross River State Library is a public library in central Calabar, Cross River State, Nigeria. The library's collection contains over 4,000 texts.

== History ==
The site on which Cross River State Library was built previously housed the Bricksfield Prison, the first maximum security prison in Nigeria, built in 1890. The building was destroyed during the Nigerian Civil War in the late 1960s, and the prison was relocated; the only remnant of the prison, the Bricksfield Prison Wall, still stands today and is part of the library's enclosure.

Construction of the Cross River State Library began under the supervision of Udokaha Esuene, Military Governor of South-Eastern State. The library was completed under Paul Omu, Esuene's successor, but its inauguration was delayed until the governance of Babatunde Elegbede, and the library was not actually used until the tenure of Clement Ebri. The library opened on April 17, 1989.

== Controversy ==
Cross River State Library faces numerous challenges, the most serious being the building's extremely poor infrastructure and lack of available services, such as electricity, water, and working toilets. The library is extremely dilapidated and has significant unrepaired damage, including shattered windows and leaking roofs, made worse by an explosion and fire at the nearby Central Bank of Nigeria Calabar branch in 2016. The library also suffers from outdated texts, rodent and reptile infestations, and frequent misuse of the library's facilities for unrelated purposes such as weddings.

According to The Guardian Nigeria, several letters have been written to the state government to inform them of the library's condition, but nothing has been done, as the government is reportedly only interested in projects that attract money to the region.

== See also ==
- List of libraries in Nigeria
