= Lenrie Olatokunbo Aina =

Nigerian librarian

- Olatokunbo
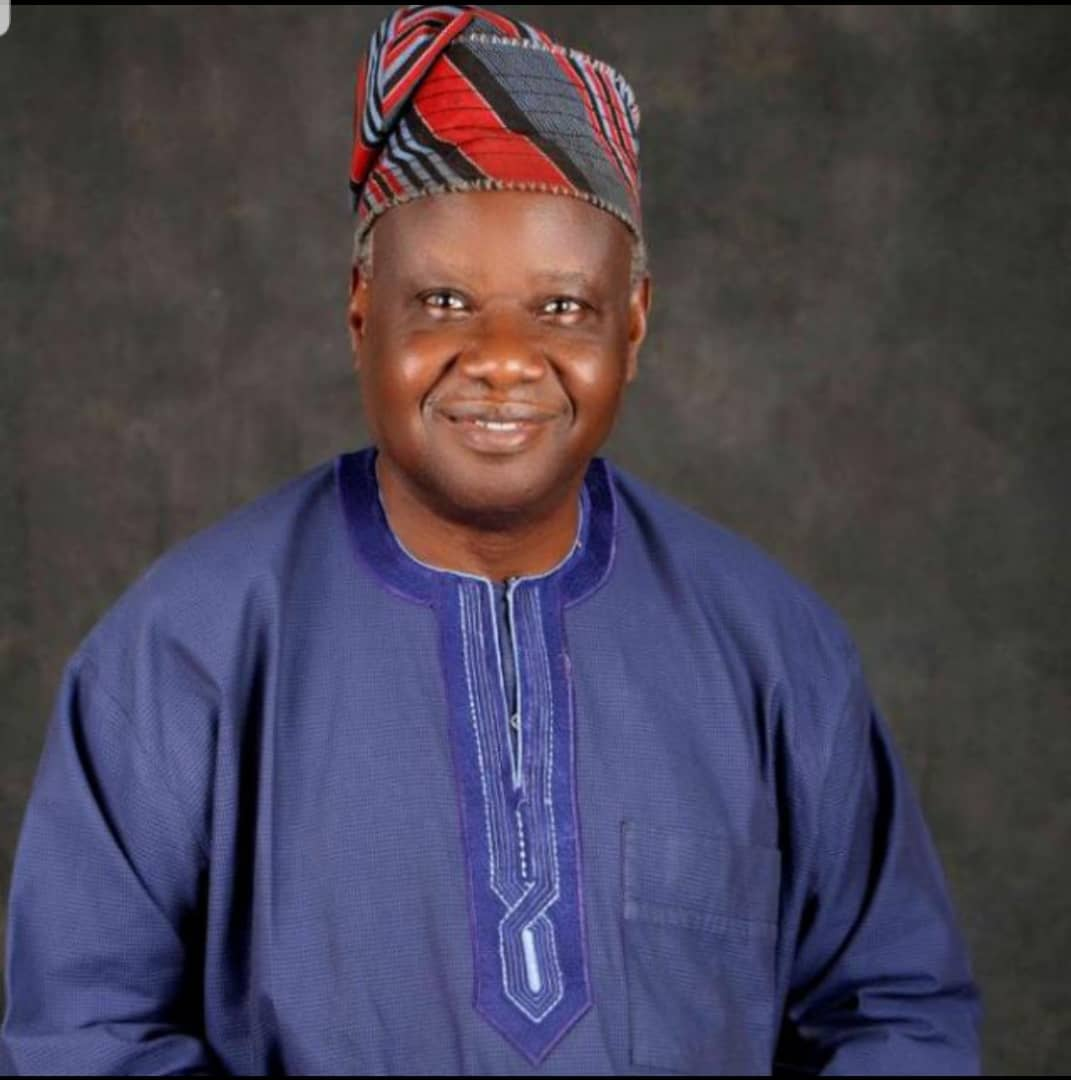
- Portrait of Prof. Lenrie Aina
- Born: 20 December 1950 (age 75)
- Education: University of Lagos, University of Ibadan, City University, London
- Occupations: Librarian, academic, author
- Employer: Federal Government of Nigeria
- Organization: National Library of Nigeria
- Known for: Library development and literacy advocacy
- Title: Professor

Lenrie Olatokunbo Aina (born 20 December 1950) is a professor of Library and Information Science, and former National Librarian/CEO of the National Library of Nigeria (NLN) Abuja.

== Education ==
Aina obtained a bachelor's degree in chemistry from the University of Lagos in 1974, a postgraduate diploma in Librarianship from the University of Ibadan in 1976, and an M.Phil. Information Science from the City University, London, in 1980. In 1986, he earned a PhD in Library Studies from the University of Ibadan, Ibadan.

== Career ==
Aina began his librarianship career at the University of Ibadan Library between 1976 and 1978. He was a Professor of Library and Information Science at the University of Ilorin, Nigeria and the University of Botswana respectively.

He is the pioneer editor-in-chief of the African Journal of Library, Archives and Information Science, the only library and information science journal in Africa covered by the world-acclaimed Web of Science. His research interests span all areas of library and information science.

Aina's notable work includes:

- Curriculum development in librarianship and information science
- Involvement in the design of master of Information Science Programme at University of Ibadan (1983-1885)
- Involvement in the design of master and doctorate degrees in Library and Information Programme at the University of Botswana (1993-1997)
- Served as a resource person in the development of curriculum of diploma, bachelor and postgraduate diploma programmes in library studies at the University of Fort Hare, South Africa (1995)

He has held positions including the following:

- Professor of Library and Information Science, University of Ilorin, 2008
- Professor, Department of Library and Information Technology, Federal University of Technology, Minna, 2008
- Professor, Department of Library and Information Studies, University of Botswana, 1998-2007
- Associate professor, Department of Library and Information Studies, University of Botswana, 1992-1998
- Senior lecturer, Department of Library and Information Studies, University of Botswana, 1989-1992
- Senior lecturer, Department of Library, Archival and Information Studies, University of Ibadan, 1986-1989
- Lecturer 1, Department of Library Studies, University of Ibadan, 1983-1986
- Lecturer II, Department of Library Studies, University of Ibadan, 1981-1983
- Assistant Lecturer, Department of Library Studies, University of Ibadan, 1978-1981
- Sub-librarian, University of Ibadan Library, Nigeria 1977-1978
- Assistant librarian, University of Ibadan Library, Nigeria 1976-1977

== Professional membership ==
Aina is a member and fellow of the Nigerian Library Association, a member of the American Library Association, and a member of the Institute of Information Scientists.

== Awards ==
- Award of excellence from Kwara State Government in 2021

== Publications ==
- Aina, L. O. (2004). Library and information science text for Africa. Ibadan, Nigeria: Third World Information Services Limited.
- Aina L.O. (2004). Research in Information Science: an African perspective. Ibadan. Sterling Horden.
- World Library and Information Congress: 73RD IFLA GENERAL CONFERENCE AND COUNCIL 19–23 August 2007, Durban, South Africa http://www.ifla.org/iv/ifla73/index.htm
- Aina, L.O. and I. M. Mabawonku (1997). The literature of the information profession in Anglophone Africa: characteristics, trends and future directions. Journal of Information Science, 23 (4) 321–326.
- Aina, L. O., & Ajiferuke, I. S. Y. (2002). Research methodologies in information Sciences. Research in information sciences: An African perspective. Stirling-Horden. Ibadan.
- Aina, L. O., & Mabawonku, I. M. (1996). Management of a scholarly journal in Africa: A success story. AFRICAN JOURNAL OF LIBRARY ARCHIVES AND INFORMATION SCIENCE, 6, 63-84.
- Aina, L.O. The provision of agricultural information to farmers and extension officers: a catalyst in increased agricultural production in Africa. Unpublished paper, 1989. 6p.
- Aina, L. O., Mutula, S. M., & Tiamiyu, M. A. (Eds.). (2008). Information and knowledge management in the digital age: concepts, technologies and African perspectives. Third World Information Services Limited.
- Aina, L.O (2002). The literature of the information profession in Anglophone Africa: characteristics, trends and future directions. African Journal of Library, Archives and Information Science, 12(2) 167-172.
- Aina, L. O. (2007, September). Appropriate curriculum for library and information science schools in Nigeria: the role of the Nigerian Library Association. In A paper presented at the conference of the Nigerian Library Association. Nigerian Library Association, Abuja, Nigeria.
- Aina, L. O. (2003, September). Strengthening information provision in Nigerian university libraries: The digital option. In 41st Annual National Conference & AGM of the Nigerian Library Association at Tarker Foundation, Markurdi (pp. 7–12).
- Aina, L.O.(2005, January). Towards an Ideal Library and Information Studies (LIS) Curriculum for Africa: Some Preliminary Thoughts. 165 – 185.
- Tiamiyu, M. A., & Aina, L. O. (2008). Information and knowledge management in the digital society: An African perspective. LO Aina, SM Mutula and MA Tiamiyu, MA (eds.), Information and knowledge management in the digital age: Concepts, technologies and African perspectives, 3-27.
- Aina, L. O. (1989). Education and training of librarians for agricultural information work in Africa. IAALD Quarterly Bulletin, 34(1), 23-26.
- Aina, L.O. (1983). Access to scientific and technological information in Nigeria: Problems and prospects. Nigerian Libraries 19 (1-3): 35-41.
- Aina, L.O. (1985) Availability of periodical titles cited in the literature of Nigeria's scientific research in Nigerian libraries. Nigerian libraries 21(1):23-27.
- Aina, L.O., A.A. Alemna and Mabawonku, Iyabo (Eds.) (2005) Improving the Quality of Library and Information Science Journals in West Africa: Proceedings of the Stakeholders Conference, Sponsored by INASP 7–8 December 2005, Ibadan, Nigeria. Ibadan: Third World Information Services, 155p.
- Aina, L. O. (2012a) Libraries: Facilitators of Knowledge Generation. Paper Presented at the Ghana Library Association 50th Anniversary Seminar, June 22, 2012 Accra, Ghana.
