= Ibom E-Library =

Public library in Nigeria

Coordinates: 5.0154°N 7.9134°E

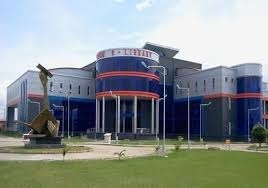
- Location: Uyo, Akwa-Ibom, Nigeria
- Type: Elibrary
- Established: September 25, 2007

Collection
- Items collected: Books, journals, newspapers, magazines, sound and music recordings, patents, databases, maps, stamps, prints, drawings and manuscripts

Access and use
- Access requirements: Open to students, researchers and general public

Other information
- Director: Ubong George
- Website: https://www.theibomelibrary.com/

The Ibom E-Library is a library located in Uyo, Akwa Ibom State, Nigeria. The library which is state-owned is the first digital type in West Africa. Also Ibom e-library is one of the biggest libraries in Africa.

== History ==
The library was launched in Uyo, Akwa Ibom State on 25 September 2007 under the administration of Former Gov. Godswill Akpabio. It was located along Ibrahim Babangida avenue in the state.

== Structure ==
Ibom library is an ultramodern complex with flamboyant facilities which aid education and academic research. It can accommodate 1,000 people, the library is divided into private and open sections as well as board rooms and offices

== Collections ==
Ibom Library contains multimedia materials resource centre for children, 1260 educational games and 1000 mathematical tools. It has over 30,000 materials that covers literature and facility for e-conferencing.

== See also ==
Academic libraries in Nigeria
