= Federal University of Technology Owerri Library =

Academic library in Ihiagwa, Nigeria

Federal University of Technology – Owerri Library
- Location: Owerri, Ihiagwa, Nigeria
- Type: Academic library
- Established: 1982 (44 years ago)

Collection
- Items collected: Books, academic journals, newspapers, magazines, sound and music recordings, patents, databases, maps, postage stamps, prints, drawings and manuscripts

Access and use
- Access requirements: Open to students, researchers, and academic and non-academic staff of the institution

Other information
- Director: Dr Mrs Justina N. Ekere
- Website: https://futo.edu.ng/

The Federal University of Technology Owerri (FUTO) Library is the primary academic library for the FUTO in Nigeria. The library is adjacent to lecture rooms, laboratories and hostels. It has ICT section that provides e-resources databases that include Science Direct, Ebscohost, Research4life databases, TEEAL and other free electronic resources.

== History ==
The Federal University of Technology Owerri was founded in 1980. On 9 November 1981, the library was formally commissioned for use. It began with the initial student population of 225; 28 teaching staff 28 and 6 academic support staff. The initial library stock was 2,500. From this humble beginning, the University Library rose to 22 staff providing traditional library services to 80 students in a small hall. It later evolved to 96,501 volumes of resources with 124 staffers providing 24,700 users with innovative knowledge service activities.

In 1986, the library created a learning resource center to provide audiovisual services. That same year, the library added a personal computer. A standalone computer with The Information Navigator Library Software (Tinlib) was provided for all federal university libraries in Nigeria. This availability triggered a new mode of cataloging and classification, acquisition, and circulation as well as other services in these universities, including FUTO.

== Collections ==
The library includes seven primary sections: social sciences, humanities, ICT unit, reference, science, technology, and agriculture. It hosts the university librarian's office, the bindery and reprographic services, security checkpoint, circulation center and bookstore. The building has a seating capacity of 500. Library administration is split into nine divisions: Acquisitions, Processing, Serials Unit, Users services, ICT Unit, and Research Training/Statistics, Documents, Reference services, Bibliography, and Special Collections.

The print collection consists of about 75,000 books; 77 journal titles; 3,200 documents and 148 maps. The library subscribes to roughly eight databases, which include some fee-based and open sources. These databases include EBSCOHOST, AGORA, OARE, HINARI and Nigerian Virtual Library, all of which can be accessed in the library and on the library website.

== Strategies and programs for information services and marketing ==
The Federal University of Technology Owerri (FUTO) Library is one of the academic libraries in Nigeria that has social media platforms where information is shared through graphics, tests, pictures and recordings. For instance, the library website operates as a center for interactive space with its users as well as provides online library and information services. There are also special online resources like theses, inaugural lectures and question papers.

Other strategies in marketing information resources and library services in the Federal University of Technology, Owerri Library are the current awareness services, referral services, selective dissemination of information, referral services, inter-library cooperation, internet services, exhibitions and display of new arrivals, document delivery services, flyers and posters, social media, consultancy services, institutional websites, library notice board, user orientation programs, face to face interaction with the user community, seminars and workshops and conferences.

There are also innovative services that allowed for the provision of an Electronic Notice Board with multimedia projecting screens. Again, is the Electronic Dashboard where users come together for common information. New students are engaged in networking while the University Library collaborate virtually with them on the library Twitter page (twitter.com/futolibrary, Facebook and blog www.Facebook.com/futolibrary, and www.futolibrary.wordpess.com respectively). The FUTO Library website (Library.futo.edu.ng) is used for awareness creation using library 2.0 windows of the Library. There are also Instant messages through the FUTO Library mailbox and GSM (library@futo.edu.ng and service hotline respectively).

== Community information services ==
The Federal University of Technology Owerri Library has considered the community information services to its host community as a corporate social responsibility in improving the standard of life of the dwellers of the rural areas.

The library has also strategized engagement with the rural community on sustainable development goals. However the challenges envisaged are the administrative bottlenecks from university management, issue of finance for logistics and implementation, poor relationship between university and rural communities as well as societal and environmental threats.

== University Librarians ==
- Mr J. C Anafulu 1981– 1998
- Mr M.S Onye 1998- 2003
- Mr J.E Nshared via graphics, pictures, tests and recordings. For instance, the library website operates as awogu 2003– 2013
- Mrs C.N Okoroafor (Acting) 2013– 2014
- Prof C.V Anunobi 2014– 2020
- Dr Mrs Gertrude Umunnakwe (Acting) 2020– 2021
- Dr Mrs Justina N. Ekere 2021–present

== See also ==
Academic libraries in Nigeria
