= National Library of Nigeria =

Apex library of Nigeria

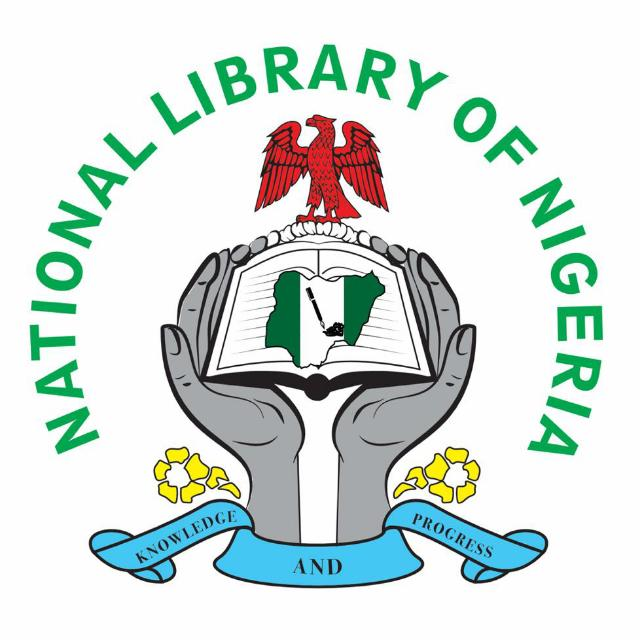
- 9.051314793591688°N 7.484004668405712°E
- Location: Sanusi Dantata House, Central Business District, Abuja, Federal Capital Territory, Nigeria
- Type: National library
- Established: 1964 (62 years ago)
- Branches: 33

Collection
- Items collected: Books, journals, newspapers, magazines, sound and music recordings, patents, databases, maps, stamps, prints, drawings and manuscripts
- Legal deposit: Yes, provided in law by: National Library Act 1964 (Nigeria)

Access and use
- Access requirements: Open to anyone with a need to use the collections and services

Other information
- Director: Professor Chinwe Veronica Anunobi (chief executive, 8 September 2021)
- Website: www.nln.gov.ng

The National Library of Nigeria is the central, government-established institution responsible for preserving the country's published heritage and supporting access to information. Established under the National Library Degree of 1970, it serves as a national repository for publications and has 33 branches across the country, including the Federal Capital Territory.

== History and organization ==
The National Library of Nigeria came into operation in the mid-1960s with the enactment of the National Library Act of 1964, later replaced by Act No. 29 of 1970. Before the passage of the National Library Act, a series of educational conferences conducted in Ibadan served as the intellectual basis for the creation of a network of libraries funded by the federal government to provide accessibility of educational materials to Nigerians. A government advisory committee was later created concerning the necessity to develop a local repository of knowledge. The committee was charged with finding a way to aid the government in bringing to prominence the intellectual foundations of its policies, creating a national bibliographic center, and providing an arena for the promotion of knowledge. The committee was the first major formal body that called for a National Library as part of its recommendations. The government accepted the advice of the committee and undertook the necessary steps to build a National Library.

The construction of the library began in 1962 and it was finally opened for public use on 6 November 1964. The headquarters was moved from Lagos to Abuja in 1995.

The Library Act, enacted by the House of Representatives of Nigeria, guaranteed financial assistance to the project, the Act also provided provisions for the training of staff and the creation of a board of directors made up of professionals. By the demands of the Nigerian Republic and the assembly, a group of 15 trained librarians were hired to play a positive role in developing and manning the library. A board was inaugurated in April 1966 by a new military government. The board was made up of government officials instead of professionals as written in the original act. However, the board tried to improve on the original objectives of the library but the Nigerian Civil War hampered funding and formal government actions were not taken until 1970. In 1970, a new legal precedent was set with the creation of the National Library decree. The decree was partly enacted on the advice of the board which wanted to expand the library to other state capitals to create a network of repositories.

== Mission ==
The Library is funded by the Federal Government of Nigeria. Originally, the Ford Foundation was involved with the project. The foundation brought in professionals, donated books, and funded the library's expansion. The library over the years has built on its original mission. Today, it is a vital organ that acts as the intellectual memory of the nation. The library provides the intellectual ammunition to aid government officers in policy implementation. However, the general direction of policy instability due to the military incursion to power sometimes created an imbalance between the intellectual memory of prior policies and the intellectual foundation of a new government. The library also stays afloat intellectually by receiving copies of books published in the country by both the government and private authorities through the legal deposit provision in the Library Act. This makes the library one of the largest depositories of knowledge in the country. It also collects publications on contemporary or new ideas from international organizations.

The responsibilities of the institution also include issuing the ISBN (International Standard Book Number) and ISSN (International Standard Serials Number) to publishing organizations, a process which was formerly cumbersome in the absence of appropriate technology at the regional offices but is getting easier with more awareness and infusion of mobile technology.

Furthermore, as part of its mandate, the library runs an annual Readership Promotion Campaign all over the country to create awareness about the importance of literacy and to get the citizenry reading.

== Strength ==
- Visionary & Selfless Leaders
- Clear and Focused Objectives
- Data house to over 10million information resources nationwide
- Local & International Partnerships (NITDA, American Space, Havilla Group etc.)
- Coordination among Staff for Targets achievement
- Local Communities support and coordination (Hamlets, Villages, Towns, Cities, State and Federal Government)
- Staff welfare & Fair Treatment for all by the Management
- Constant Evolution and Maximum Technology adaption by the Leaders of the Parastatal

== Challenges ==
The National Library of Nigeria has challenges that inhibit it from fulfilling its stated objectives.

- Dilapidated facilities and resources are a result of inadequate funding.
- The library headquarters operates from rented apartments as the complex which is meant to house it remains uncompleted since it was started in 2006.
- The library has 33 branches and is making efforts to effectively expand to the 36 state capitals of the federation as designated by the library decree of 1970.
- Poor reading culture in Nigeria is also a challenge as this spawns a nonchalant attitude to the growth of the library while hindering the use of its facilities and services.
- Inadequate and non-progressive staff training to keep the professionals abreast of current best practices in the ever-evolving information sector especially as pertains to the use of technology to organize resources and offer services.
- Outdated materials are found in the library; hardly will you get new materials.

== Branches ==
Locations:

- Kano City, Kano State
- Akure, Ondo State
- Garki, Abuja
- Yaba, Lagos State
- Enugu, Enugu State
- Yenegoa, Bayelsa State
- Abakaliki, Ebonyi State
- Asaba, Delta State
- Ado Ekiti, Ekiti State
- Port Harcourt, Rivers State
- Kaduna, Kaduna State
- Damaturu, Yobe State
- Jos, Plateau State
- Ibadan, Oyo State
- Minna, Niger State
- Sokoto, Sokoto State
- Katsina, Katsina State
- Umuahia, Abia State
- Yola, Adamawa State
- Bauchi, Bauchi State
- Makurdi, Benue State
- Maiduguri, Borno State
- Calabar, Cross Rivers State
- Benin City Edo State
- Gombe, Gombe State
- Owerri, Imo State
- Dutse, Jigawa State
- Ilorin, Kwara State
- Lafia, Nasarawa State
- Sapon-Abeokuta, Ogun State
- Osogbo, Osun State
- Uyo, Akwa Ibom State
- Jalingo, Taraba State
- Garki, Abuja

== Chief Executive Officer ==
Prof. Chinwe Veronica Anunobi was appointed as chief executive officer of the library on 8 September 2021. She has served as the University Librarian of the Federal University of Technology, Owerri, Imo State. She is a member of the Governing Council of African Library and Information Associations and Institutions (AfLIA) where she is serving her second term and represents the entire West Africa region. She took over from Prof. Lenrie Olatokunbo Aina who was the chief executive officer of the National Library of Nigeria from 2016 to 2021.

== See also ==
- National Library
- List of libraries in Nigeria
- National Archives of Nigeria
- List of National Libraries
