= Kenneth Dike Library, University of Ibadan =

Main library in the University of Ibadan Nigeria

Coordinates: 7°26′48″N 3°53′46″E

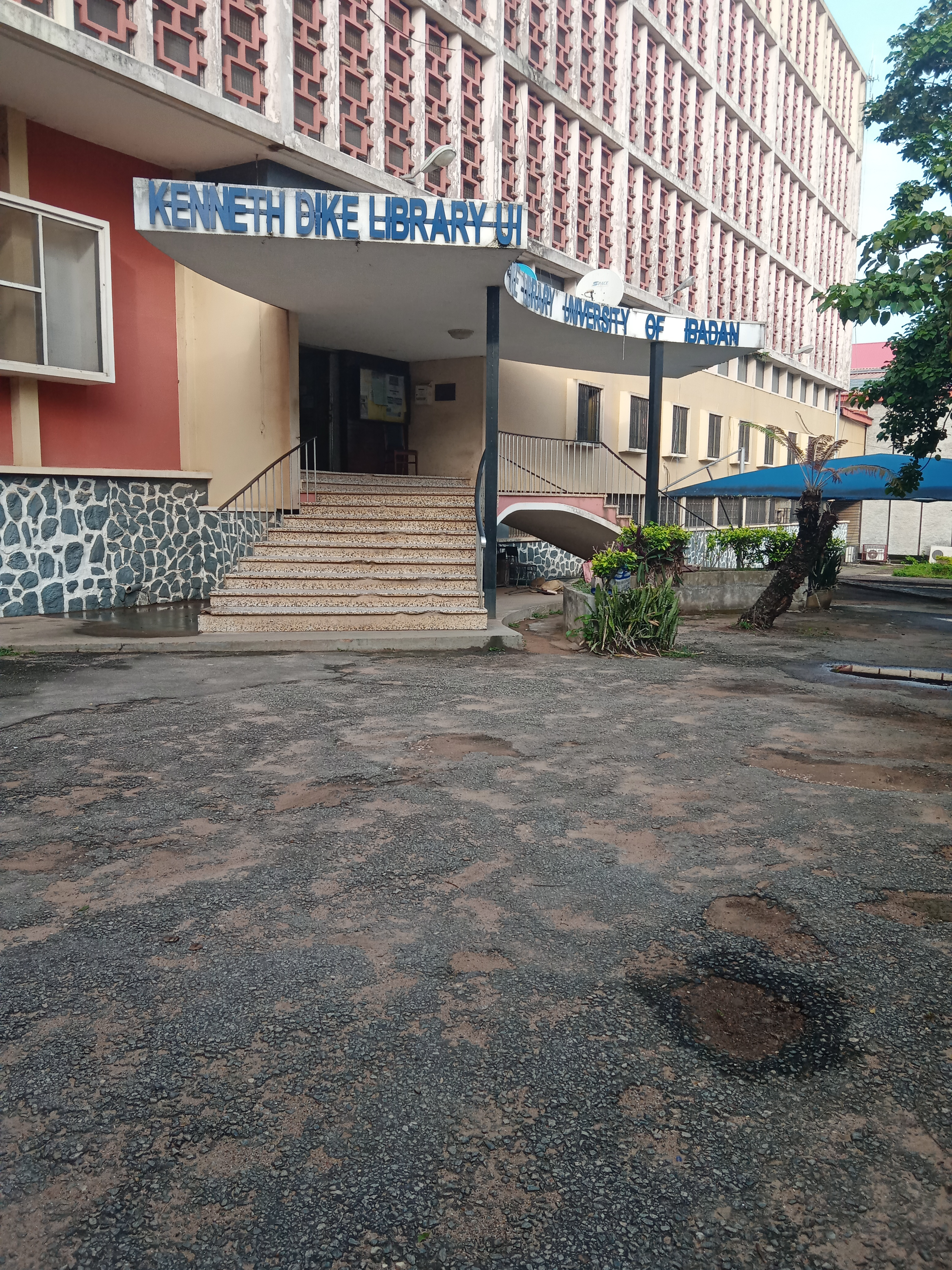
- Location: Ibadan, Nigeria
- Type: Academic Library
- Established: 1948

Other information
- Director: Femi Idowu
- Website: library.ui.edu.ng

Kenneth Dike Library was founded in 1948 as part of the University of Ibadan academic community. It has over two million academic materials such as books, theses and journals.

The library was previously known as the Main Library and started with about 3600 volumes of books that were transferred from the library at Yaba Higher College. The Dike library was the first professionally managed library in the country staffed with a professional librarian with reference and research services.

== History ==
Upon the establishment of University College, Ibadan, a makeshift structure built with a concrete foundation and wooden walls and shutters temporarily housed the volumes of books transferred from Yaba College in Lagos. The Library, like all the departments and the central administration of the University, operated in a prefabricated wooden building at the Eleyele site in Ibadan from its inception until 1954, when it moved to its permanent site at Oyo Road, Ibadan. It was among the first buildings to be constructed on the permanent site. Sited in the centre of the university campus, the library building was officially commissioned on the 17th of November, 1954 as the Main Library of Ibadan University. The university was also developed with 18,000 volumes of diverse subjects from the Henry Carr Collection. It also received items from the Herbert Macaulay Collection. Other significant gifts included donations from Lady Lane, the wife of Allen Lane, the British Directorate of Overseas Survey, Frederick Montague Dyke, the Church Missionary Society, and a granddaughter of MacGregor Laird. In 1950, an ordinance made the library a repository of publications published in Nigeria.

=== University librarians ===
- Dr. Helen O.Komolafe-Opadeji
- Dr. Mercy A. Iroaghanachi
- Dr. Akinleye Joseph O

https://www.library.ui.edu.ng/#

== Services ==
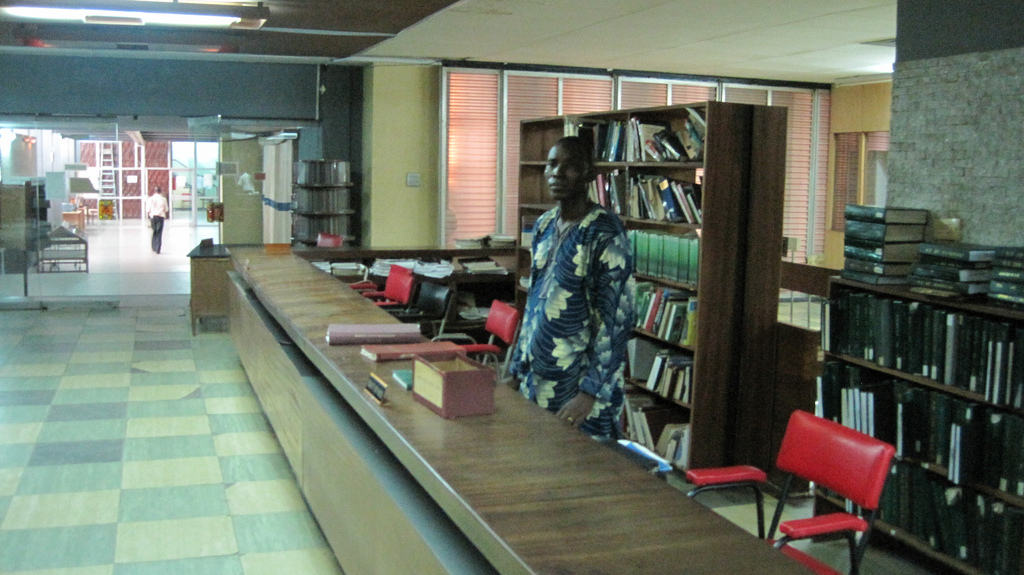
A librarian standing up to attend to a user in the library

Kenneth Dike library provides information services to all categories of users to support the teaching, learning and research process of the parent institution. These services include library education (orientation for new students), reference service, charging and discharging, current awareness service, e-resources service, as well as 24 hours service among others.

== Special collections ==
=== Africana collection ===
The library has an African-oriented collection, a closed access reference point for scholars on Nigerian history. This was developed from the early donations to the library which had a strong focus on Nigerian and African materials. Donations by Carr, Macaulay, Edward Reginald Jerrim helped make it an important repository in Nigeria. In 1950, the library became a depository of published books from Nigeria. The collection includes rare Arabic manuscripts, manuscripts and books, newspaper clips, photographs and records, and archives of materials from the colonial era and government reports.
