= Selective dissemination of information =

Selective dissemination of information (SDI) was originally a phrase related to library and information science. SDI refers to tools and resources used to keep a user informed of new resources on specified topics, including the current-awareness services used to inform about new library acquisitions.

SDI services pre-date the World Wide Web, and the term itself is somewhat dated. Contemporary analogous systems for SDI services include alerts, current awareness tools or trackers. These systems provide automated searches that inform the user of the availability of new resources meeting the user's specified keywords and search parameters. Alerts can be received a number of ways, including email, RSS feeds, voice mail, Instant messaging, and text messaging.

Selective dissemination of information was a concept first described by Hans Peter Luhn of IBM in the 1950s. Software was developed in many companies and in government to provide this service in the 1950s and 60s, which allowed distribution of items recently published in abstract journals to be routed to individuals who are likely to be interested in the contents. For example, the system at Ft. Monmouth automatically sent out (by mail) a different set of abstracts to each of about 1,000 scientists and engineers in the army depending on what they were working on. The selection was based on an "interest profile," a list of keywords that described their interests. In some organizations, the 'interest profile' was much more than a simple list of keywords. Librarians or information professionals conducted extensive interviews with their clients to establish a fairly complex profile for each individual. Based on these profiles, the information professionals would then distribute selectively appropriate information to their clients. This labour-intensive operation, while initially costly, over time was made less so. A survey at the time (1970s) indicated that a large number of projects were affected by the SDI service. The software was developed by Edward Housman at the Signal Corps Laboratories Technical Information Division.
