= Sunny Adagbonyi =

Nigerian academics

Asomwan Sonnie Adagbonyin

Acting Vice chancellor of Ambrose Alli University
- In office February 8, 2022 – September 2, 2024
- Preceded by: Osarhieme Osadolor
- Succeeded by: Samuel Olowo

Asomwan Sonnie Adagbonyin is a professor and the former Acting Vice-Chancellor of Ambrose Alli University appointed after the removal of Benson Osadolor in 2022.

== Career ==
Adagbonyin was appointed as the Acting Vice-Chancellor of Ambrose Alli University on 8 February 2022 by Edo State Governor, Godwin Obaseki following the removal of his predecessor. Adagbonyin stepped down as the Acting Vice-Chancellor following the constitution of inaugural team for a substantive VC in the school on the 2nd of September, 2024 with Samuel Olowo, The Provost of college of Medicine appointed the new acting Vice-chancellor.

== Controversy ==
Adagbonyin claimed that Trojan News, an online publishing firm, had spread false news about his personality, and he threatened to sue them via a letter issued from A.O.O. Ekpu and Co. Law firm.
