= Sam Ehimigbai Ifidon =

Retired Nigerian Librarian and Administrator

Professor Sam Ehimigbai Ifidon
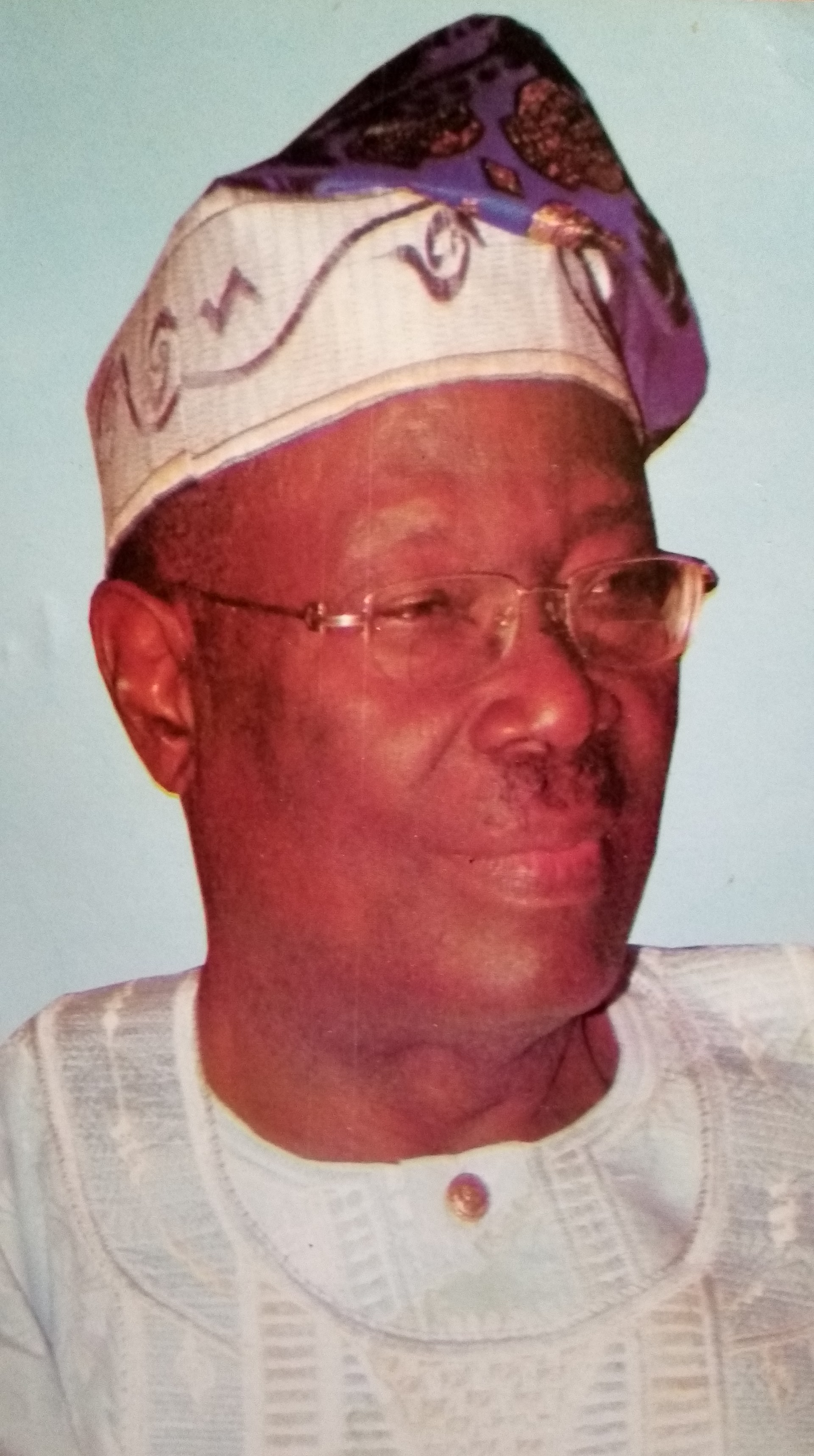
- Born: 7 July 1941 (age 85); Sabongidda-Ora
- Education: University of Western Ontario; University of London
- Known for: Librarianship
- Parent(s): Mr. & Mrs. of Samuel Odion Ifidon

Professor Samuel Ehimigbai Ifidon (born 7 July 1941) is a Nigerian retired librarian. He holds a Bachelor of Arts Degree in Classics from the University of London; postgraduate diploma, from the University of Ibadan, Masters of Library and Information Science, University of Western Ontario, Canada; Doctorate Degree from the University of Ibadan. A Chartered Librarian, Fellow of the Nigerian Library Association and member of Nigerian Institute of Management. He has published 7 books, 8 chapters in books, and over 50 articles in national and international journals.

== Early life ==
Professor Samuel Ehimigbai Ifidon was born on July 7, 1941, to the family of Mr. & Mrs. Samuel Odion Ifidon, in Sabongidda-Ora, Owan West Local Government Area of Edo State, Nigeria. His mother, Esther Ukpenoigbuan Ifidon, was the second of her husband’s seven wives.

=== Education ===
He received his primary education at the Church Missionary School (C.M.S), now Asoro Primary School, Benin City in 1946. He later finishes his primary education in Lagos State, at St. Michael’s C.M.S (1946–1951), this was due to the transfer of his father from Benin Post Office to Lagos General Post Office, Ebute-Meta, Lagos State.

After his primary education in the North part of Nigeria, he moved back to the South to continue his secondary education due to rarity of secondary schools in the North at Holy Trinity Grammar School, Sabongidda-Ora, Western Region of Nigeria (1952–1958).

In 1958, he proceeded for his Higher School Certificate at King’s College, Lagos (1959–1960).

Bachelor of Arts degree, University of London (1960–1964); postgraduate diploma in Library and Information Science, University of Ibadan, (1966); Masters of Library and Information Science, University of Western Ontario, Canada, (1970); and doctorate degree, University of Ibadan (1978)

== Academic career ==
He started his academic career as a class teacher in Isoyin Grammar School, Ijebu-Ode in 1961 after obtaining Higher School Certificate. He worked with the Federal Ministry of Information as an Information Officer between July and September 1964. Upon completion of the diploma program, he was employed as a Graduate assistant in 1965 by the University of Lagos; he was promoted to Sub-Librarian 2 in 1968, at the University of Lagos Library. That same year, he left for Canada on a study leave for his Masters and upon completion, worked as an Administrative Assistant, University of Western Ontario, (1970); after the expiration of study leave, he returned to the University of Lagos and was promoted to Sub-Librarian 1 and subsequently Senior Sub-Librarian (1973).

In 1973, left for the then Midwestern Polytechnic (now Auchi Polytechnic) as the pioneer Polytechnic Librarian; furthermore, he worked as a Deputy University Librarian and University Librarian (Ag), Ahmadu Bello University (1976–1977).

In 1978, upon his appointment, he became the pioneer University Librarian, University of Maiduguri (1978–1982). In 1982, the irresistible home pulling by the late Professor Ambrose Mofolorunso Alli (former Governor of Bendel State, now Edo State), to help set up an academic library for the newly established Bendel state University, now Ambrose Alli University (1982–1997).

In 1997, after he was peremtorily retired by Group Captain Baba Adamu Iyam (Military Administor). In 1998, he was appointed the pioneer University Librarian of Delta State University, becoming the first Professor of library studies in Abraka (1998-2004). Within a short period at Delta State University set up it library school with three (3) programmes- B.Sc., M.Sc., and PhD in Library and Information Science on a sound footing. While in Abraka, he was Head, Department of Library and Information Science; Dean, Faculty of Social Sciences; and Dean, Postgraduate Schools. He was intimated by Ambrose Alli University to help replicate his achievements in Delta State University, Abraka in 1999. However, it was another 5 (five) years until 2004 when he felt able to consummate his new appointment in Ekpoma due to his commitment in Abraka. He pioneered the establishment of the Department of Library and Information Science in Ambrose Alli University, Ekpoma, Edo State.

Until his retirement in 2006, Prof. Ifidon had produced one (1) First Class graduate; 150 second class (upper division) graduates; and 250 second class (lower division) graduates. He also produced 8 PhD candidates some of whom are Professors/Readers and heads in departments in their various institutions

=== Contributions to Nigeria Library Association ===
Since 1965, he has been an active member of the Nigeria Library Association. He was the pioneer Managing Editor of Lagos Librarian (now Basic Librarian), the Journal of Lagos State Division of the Association (1972–1974); the National Publicity Officer of the Association (1974–1975); Chairman of the Borno State Chapter (1978–1986); Chairman of Bendel (now Edo) State Chapter (1984–1986); and member of the governing council of the association (1974–1986). He was part of the struggle that culminated in the recognition of Librarians in academics institutions as academic staff and the acceptance of the Librarianship as a full-fledged profession by the promulgation of the Librarians’ registration council of Nigeria Act in 1995 and was subsequently elected to head the Education Committee of the Association as Chairman to the criteria for determining a Librarian in Nigeria.

== Honors and awards ==
- Kings College Scholarship(1959–1960)
- In 1960, he became the first student to earn distinction in General Paper since the inception of King’s College in 1909
- Federal Government Scholarship (1961–1964)
- H. W. Foundation Scholarship (1970–1971)
- Resource Persons Award in Library Management: Inter-University Council Award, Britain, 1978
- British Council International Seminar Award, 1995
- Carnegie Corporation of New York, 1965

== Professional membership ==
- Nigeria Library Association
- Fellow Nigeria Library Association
- Chartered Librarian of Nigeria
- Nigeria Institute of Management
- Committee of University Librarians of Nigeria
- National Management Information Systems Implementation Committee, National Universities Commission
- Editorial Adviser, Nigerian Libraries
- Editorial board, African journal of academic librarianship
- COMMUNICATE, Journal of Library and Information Science
- Canadian Library Association

== Publications ==
Professor Sam E. Ifidon has published three monographs (one of them, Collection Development in African University Libraries, was reviewed in World Libraries Vol. 2, No. 1) and numerous articles in such journals as Library Review, Libri, International Library Review, African Journal of Academic Librarianship, Journal of Academic Librarianship, and Nigerian Libraries. He was formerly the editor in Chief of Communicate: Journal of Library and Information Science. In 2019 he co-authored "Reference and Information Services in African Libraries" with Prof. Mrs. E.I. Ifidon.
