= Ambrose Alli University Library =

Academic library in Edo State, Nigeria

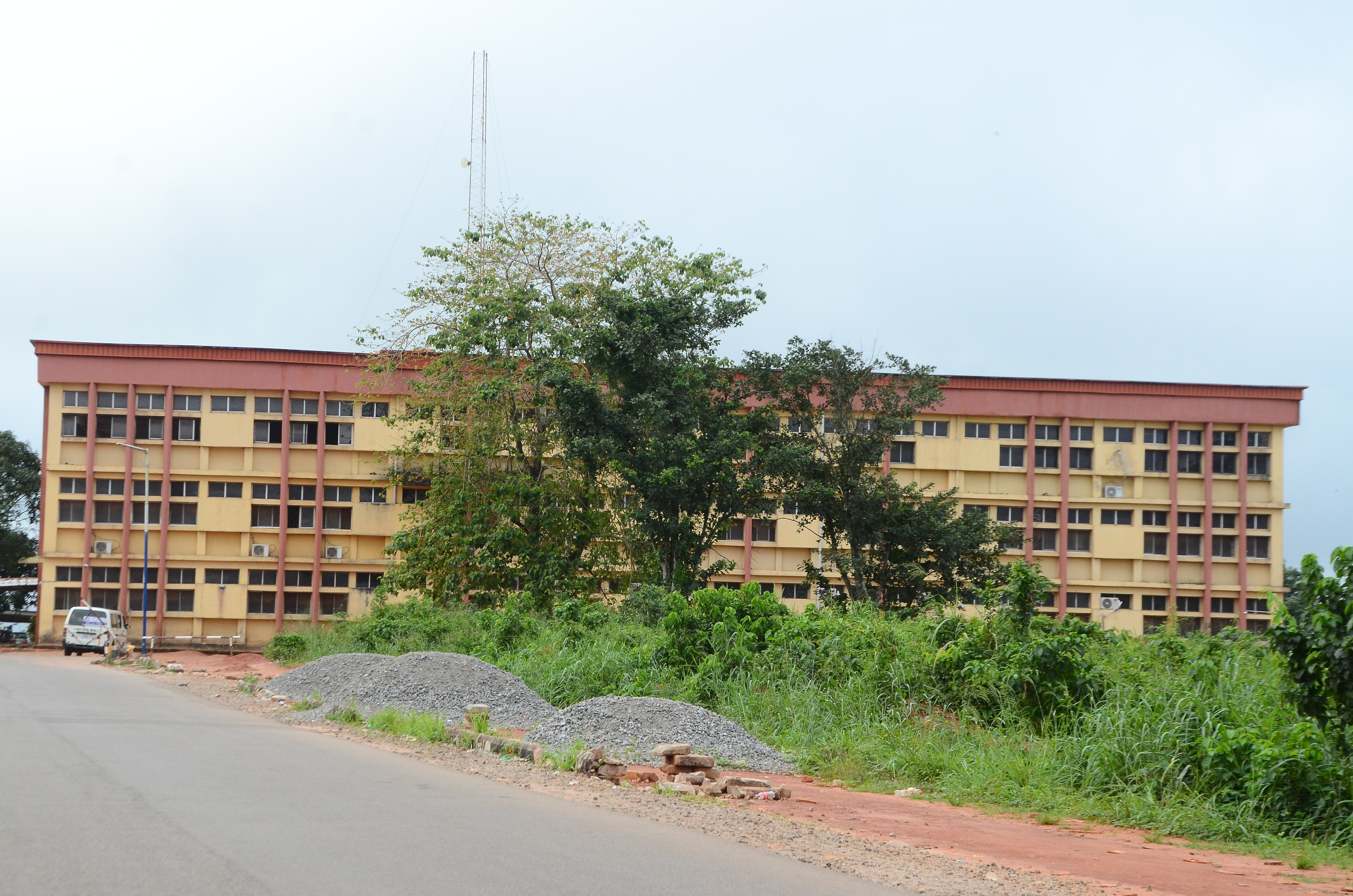
- Side View of Ambrose Alli University Library
- 6.732414579012313°N 6.091646878930816°E
- Location: Ekpoma, Nigeria
- Type: Academic library
- Established: 1982

Other information
- Affiliation: Ambrose Alli University
- Website: https://aauekpoma.edu.ng/

Ambrose Alli University Library, situated in its parent institution, was established after the formation of the university in 1982 by the then Governor of Bendel State (now Edo and Delta state), Professor Ambrose Folorunso Alli (1979 – 1983).

== History ==
First known as Bendel State University Library, then to Edo State University Library. It was later changed to its present name in commemoration of the founder, Prof. Ambrose Folorunso Alli in 1991. The university library is centrally located for easy access by the university community.

The university library in its early years of existence in 1982, witnessed series of movements in search of a befitting accommodation. The first movement was from its makeshift office in the University Guest House at Ikhiro Road to a temporary administrative block in the then Okpebho Local Government Secretariat. By November 1982, the library moved for the second time to another temporary administrative location of a three-bedroom bungalow at Ukpenu along Benin-Auchi Expressway before moving for the third time to Emaudo Campus in December 1982. The Emaudo Campus being the initial permanent site provided a more enabling environment for the library to operate satisfactorily.

However, in 1987, the library moved for the fourth time to a relatively more congenial academic environment located at Ujemen, now the permanent site of the university along the Benin-Auchi Expressway. On May 15, 1999, a definitive 3-storey library building occupying approximately 14,000m2 with a seating capacity of 2,500 was commissioned by the then Head of State, General Abdulsalam Abubakar.

On September 10, 2017, the library had four main outreach libraries which included; the Clinical Library situated at the Faculty of Clinical Sciences beside the Irrua Specialist Teaching Hospital, Irrua, Medical Library, located at the College of Medicine, Emaudo Annex Library located at the school of part-time, pre-degree, and Agriculture, and Law Library situated at the Faculty of Law at the main campus. Each of these libraries mentioned above has its unique roles and functions for the academic excellence of the university.

== Administration ==
Chronology of Past University librarians

- Dr. Frederick Odion (acting University librarian)
- Dr. (Mrs.) Margaret Onobha Momodu (2021)
- Dr. (Mrs.) Jane I. Aba (2015–2021)
- Dr (Mrs.) Juliana B. Amune (2014–2015)
- Dr. (Mrs.) E.I Ifidon (2003–2014)
- Mr. Ojo-Igbinoba (1997–2003)
- Professor Sam Ifidon (1982–1997)

== Location of faculty libraries ==
- Agricultural Library – Emaudo Campus
- Law Library – Faculty of Law
- Clinical Library – Faculty of Clinical Science
- Medical College Library – College of Medicine
- Library and Information Science Library (Media Resource Center) – Dept. of LIS
- Management Science Library – Faculty of Management Science
- Data Room Unit Library – Faculty of Environmental Studies
- Education Library - Faculty of Education

== Collections ==
The library became fully operational in 1983, with a book stock of 36,509 volumes, being 30,818 books and 5691 government documents, and 369 journal titles.

The library as of 2021 has a holding of more than 223,870 volumes of books, 102,099 journals, magazines, thesis/dissertations, government and special collections. The library operates a hybrid library system as it provides print and non-print information sources in CDs, e-books, e-journals, and 21 databases that cut across all fields of academic programs of the institution.

== Services ==
The library provides materials and services that support the university's academic programs in teaching, learning, and research. It provides information materials to meet the needs and satisfaction of students (undergraduates and postgraduates), lecturers, and other researchers. The services provided are also used as motivating factors as well as a measurement of the job satisfaction of the library staff.

The services include but are not limited to:

Wireless access points: The availability of wireless connectivity makes it easy for library users to access the internet and/or networked resources on phones and laptop computers.

Reprographic and bindery services: the reprographic unit provides ethical use of library of information sources, while the bindery section carries out the repair of worn-out library books and binding of project work.

Circulation services:

Institutional repository: the university's intellectual/research output is constantly being digitized and made accessible to library users.

Reference services: there is the provision of reference information services across various disciplines for students and faculty

Loaning or borrowing of books: The library allows library users to borrow books.

Although Ambrose Alli University Library offers services to its users, certain challenges have been linked to it. These include a low level of service delivery and a non-conducive work environment.
