= Roland Igbadumhe =

- Other name: Youngest Old Man
- Education: Ambrose Alli University
- Occupations: Comedian, politician
- Political party: All Progressives Congress

Roland Igbadumhe, also known by his stage name Youngest Old Man, is a Nigerian comedian and political aide from Edo State.

== Early life and career ==
Igbadumhe grew up in Edo State and studied at Ambrose Alli University in Ekpoma. He began performing stand-up comedy under the name Youngest Old Man, appearing in regional comedy shows including Night of a Thousand Laughs and AY Live, and later organized local entertainment events in Abuja.

== Politics ==
In January 2014, Edo State Governor Adams Oshiomhole appointed Igbadumhe as Senior Special Assistant on Entertainment.

He ran for the Etsako East constituency seat in the Edo State House of Assembly during the 2019 elections under the Social Democratic Party (SDP), but lost to Kingsley Ugabi of the All Progressives Congress (APC). He later rejoined the APC.

In May 2026, Governor Monday Okpebholo appointed him Special Adviser on Livestock Development.
