= ICent =

Nigerian musical artist

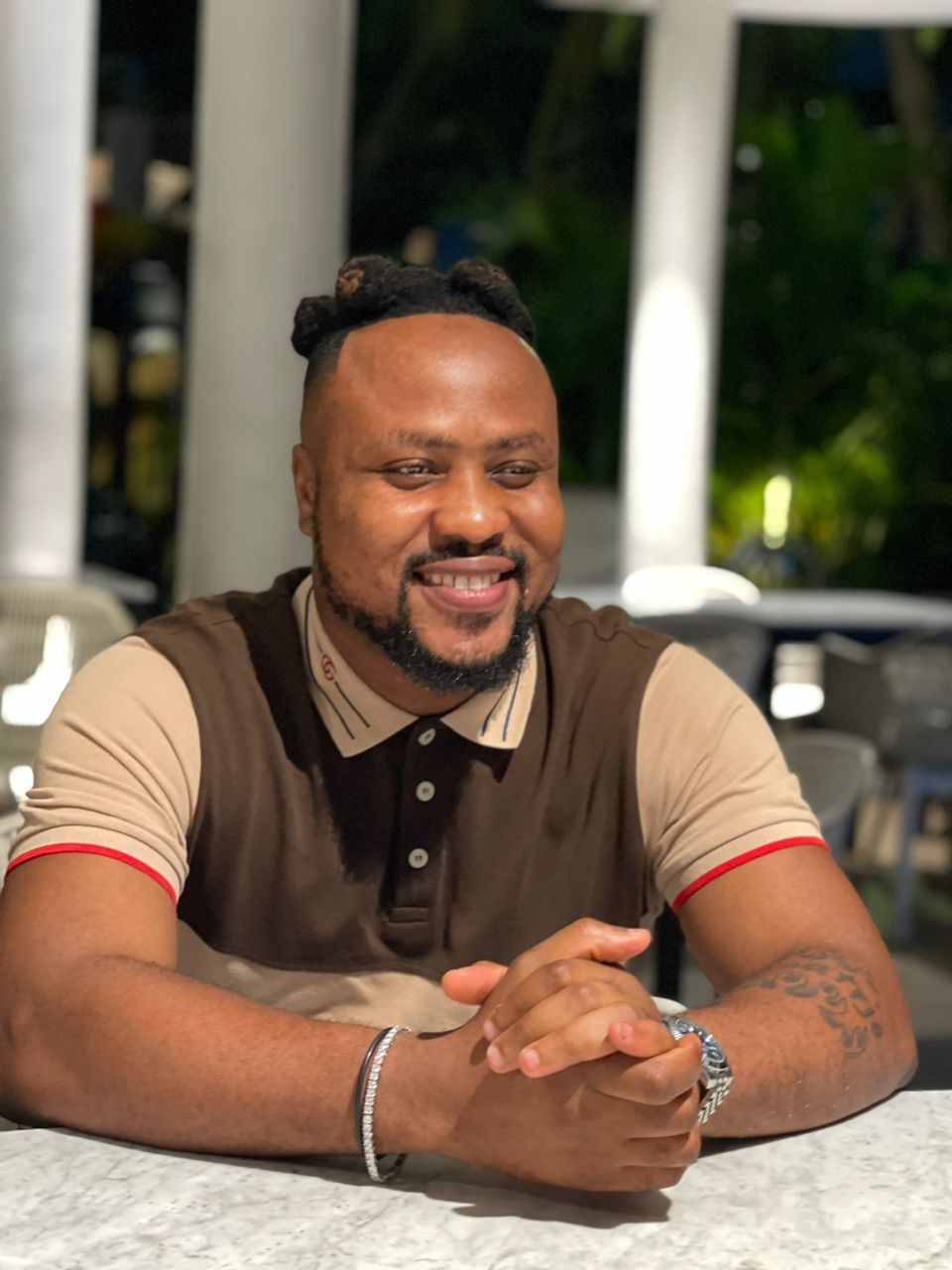

Background information
- Born: Samson Ebosetale; November 22
- Origin: Edo State, Nigeria
- Genres: Hip hop; Pop; Afrofusion; R'n'b
- Occupations: Songwriter; Singer
- Years active: 2014–present
- Label: Ice Nation records

Samson Ebosetale (born November 22), known professionally as ICent, is a Nigerian singer and songwriter. In 2023, he won the Song of the Year and Artist of the Year at the Turkey African Recognition Awards (TARA).

== Early life and education ==
ICent was born on 22 November in Edo State, Nigeria. He attended Ambrose Ali University, where he studied Accounting and attributes his passion for to the influence of traditional Nigerian music all around him growing up like 2Baba and Jay Z.

== Music career ==
ICent began his musical journey in Edo performing at local events, honing his craft ad from church choir. His breakthrough came with the release of his single "Robo," featuring Olamide, and plugged by Olaitan Salaudeen which gained popularity for its catchy rhythm and relatable lyrics. Following this success, ICent released other singles, including "Odo," "Body," "Energy," "Hello," "Squeeze Me," "Big Man," "Lala," and "Long Time.

== Discography ==
=== EP ===
- About Time (2021)
- Sunny Days (2022)

=== Single ===
- Robo Featuring Olamide"
- Number One Featuring Skale
- Showcase Featuring Jaywon
- Energy
- Lala
- Body
- Long time
- Big Man
- Odo
- Wanita Feat. Phina (Tanzania Artiste)
- Alive Feat. Rayjeezy
- Anadoo
- Asasa and Omonigho
