= Librarians' Registration Council of Nigeria =

Regulate practice of Librarianship in Nigeria

LRCN
- Established: 2002 (24 years ago)
- Registrar/CEO: Alhaji Ja'afaru Abdullahi Wase
- Staff: 73
- Members: 6,796(as of 2020)
- Location: Abuja
- Website: www.lrcn.gov.ng

The Librarians' Registration Council of Nigeria (LRCN) was established as a parastatal under the Federal Ministry of Education by Act 12/Decree 12 of 1995 (CAP L.13, LFN 2004) by the Nigerian government. The Council is responsible for providing leadership in the field of librarianship by regulating education for library and information science and its practice in Nigeria.

== History ==
In the formative years of librarianship in Nigeria, all staff within libraries were regarded and addressed as librarians irrespective of their educational backgrounds. The need to have a professional body to define who is a librarian, regulate the affairs of librarians and librarianship in Nigeria led to the "process to establish a regulatory body for the library and information science profession."

In 1975, a committee was set up by Nigerian Library Association leadership led by Mr. E. B. Bankole as Chairman during the Association's Annual Conference in Badagry, Lagos, Nigeria. The conference was presided over by Alhaji Abdullahi Haruna Ningi. In 1995, Decree 12 of 1995 establishing the Librarian Council Registration of Nigeria, was signed into law by the then-Head of State, General Sani Abacha. The Council is charged with determining who is a librarian; determining what standards of knowledge and skills are required by persons seeking to become librarians, and then must be registered by and addressed as registered librarians; maintaining a register of librarians; and maintaining discipline within the profession.

The body was not inaugurated and funded to function when the then Minister of Education Professor Babalola Borisade inaugurated the first LRCN Governing Council in May 2002. Dr. James Daniel the then NLA President was elected as the Chairman and Dr. Victoria Okojie as the Acting Registrar/CEO. In July 2005, the Council successfully conducted the induction of the first batch of librarians (534). After the expiration of their tenure in 2005, the Council was not reconstituted by the government until October 2009.

In 2009, the Federal Government appointed Victoria Okojie as the Acting Registrar/CEO for the second time, this time with a budgetary allocation. Beginning in 2016, Michael Afolabi was the Registrar/CEO. Over 5000 librarians have been certified by the Council since 2009.

In 2018, the Council announced its plans to introduce qualifying examinations for librarians before induction as certified librarians to practice in Nigeria.

== Departments ==
LRCN as a body is organized under the following departments and units with specific functions:

- Administration
- Finance and Accounts
- ICT
- Planning, Research and Statistics
- Office of the Registrar/CEO
- Professional Services

== Publications ==
- LRCN Bulletin is a monthly publication of the council. The first edition was published in March, 2011. It covers activities of LRCN programmes and projects, training, workshops, and conferences.
- LRCN Newsletter is a bi-annual publication of the Council first published in July, 2011.
- Librarians' Registration Council of Nigeria (2012). LRCN: A newsletter of the Librarians' Registration Council of Nigeria. Abuja: Librarians' Registration Council of Nigeria. OCLC 893914613. ISSN 2276-8874.
- Librarians' Registration Council of Nigeria (2013). Librarians' Registration Council of Nigeria: Librarians code of ethics. Abuja: Librarians' Registration Council of Nigeria, p. 19. OCLC 991572260. ISBN 9789785199741.
- Librarians' Registration Council of Nigeria (2005). List of certified librarians in Nigeria. Abuja: Librarians' Registration Council of Nigeria OCLC 858920319.
- Librarians' Registration Council of Nigeria (2015). Standards and guidelines for public libraries in Nigeria. Abuja: Librarians' Registration Council of Nigeria, p. 46. OCLC 973552917. ISBN 9789789519644.
- Librarians' Registration Council of Nigeria (2019). Standards and guidelines for academic libraries in Nigeria. Abuja: Librarians' Registration Council of Nigeria, p. 19. OCLC 1127640669. ISBN 9789789720569.

== See also ==
- List of libraries in Nigeria
