= Samuel Olowo =

Nigerian academics

Acting Vice chancellor of Ambrose Alli University
- Incumbent
- Assumed office August 28, 2024
- Preceded by: Sunny Adagbonyi
- Succeeded by: Eunice Omonzejie

Samuel Olowo is a professor, medical practitioner and the acting Vice-chancellor of Ambrose Alli University. He was appointed in August 2024 after the announcement of a transition plan by the governing council of the school. He was appointed after his predecessor, Sunny Adagbonyi, stepped down as the Acting VC after a two year tenure.

== Career ==
Olowo is a professor of medical microbiology who graduated from the University of Ilorin. He was the former Head of the Department of Medical Microbiology, Dean of the Faculty of Clinical Sciences, Deputy Provost and Provost of the College of Medicine of Ambrose Alli University before he was appointed as the Acting Vice-Chancellor of the school on 28 August, 2024.
