= Osarhieme Osadolor =

Nigerian academics

Acting Vice chancellor of Ambrose Alli University
- In office May 10, 2021 – February 8, 2022
- Preceded by: Prof. Ignatius A. Onimawo
- Succeeded by: Prof. Asomwan Sonnie Adagbonyin

Osarhieme Benson Osadolor is a Nigerian professor of history and International studies. He is the author of the collection: Cradle of Ideas, A Compendium of Speeches and Writings of Omo N’Oba Erediauwa of Great Benin and former dean of student affairs at the University of Benin. On May 10, 2021, he was appointed as the acting vice-chancellor of the Ambrose Alli University where he served for 10 months until his removal on February 8, 2022.

== See also ==
- List of vice chancellors in Nigeria
- Ambrose Alli University
