= Juwon Lawal =

Nigerian businessman and energy executive

Juwon Lawal (born 22 October 1979) is a Nigerian entrepreneur and energy executive who serves as founder and group chief executive officer of both Africent Group (renamed in 2025 as Crestal Group) and JuWonOil LLC. Lawal's businesses include petroleum trade, marine fuel supply, shipping logistics and agro-processing services.

== Background and education ==
Lawal grew up working within his father's palm kernel oil business. After his father's death in 1999, he took on more responsibility in the business. He attended Ambrose Alli University where he earned a BSc. in Business Administration and an MBA; and later completed a management development course at Imperial College Business School.

== Career ==
Lawal joined the energy sector in 2005. In 2007, he created Stevepel Energy Resources Limited and diversified into shipping logistics by founding S.T. & L. Bunkers Limited, which supplied marine fuel and lubricants. The business was later continued by ABD Fuels Plc. In an interview, Lawal described how the company lost vessels in January 2010, leading to a restructuring within the business. Some of ABD Fuels' petroleum logistics were continued by S8 Contractors & Company Limited.

From 2016 to 2019, Lawal worked as a senior trader at Winson Oil Trading Pte Ltd based in Singapore.

In 2017, Lawal created the holding company Africent Group to include businesses within the energy, shipping, agro-processing and other sectors. The group operated within Nigeria, the United Kingdom and the United Arab Emirates. Its businesses included AfricentOCL UK, Africent Industries and Eleven Ocean Limited (created in 2023), providing mining logistics, drilling and infrastructure. During the COVID-19 lockdown, the firm launched KreekAfrica, an online freelancing platform where African talents and professionals showcased their skills.

AfricentOCL UK was renamed JuWonTankers UK Limited in November 2024. The business was renamed to include energy trading, shipping and transport support services. In February 2025, Africent Group was renamed to Crestal Group Limited. Crestal Group would later announce a major restructuring under a single global brand known as JuWon Global Energy Company, bringing together its former independent entities: JuWonOil LLC (USA), JuWonEnergies (West Africa), and Cropy Ltd, an agroprocessing platform.

In September 2024, Lawal created JuWonOil LLC based in Houston, Texas. Ship & Bunker reported that the company became the sole distributor of Q8 marine lubricants in Texas.

Lawal's business leadership model was later examined in an analysis by Terry Agada, published on the Leadership Institute's website.

He is one of Africa's energy professionals advocating for a "transition from a reliance on foreign aid to a model driven by infrastructure-led entrepreneurship and local value retention," and that African nations must focus on solving its energy challenges to "unlock sustainable development."
