= Eunice Omonzejie =

Nigerian academic

Vice Chancellor of Ambrose Alli University
- Assuming office 2025
- Succeeding: Samuel Olowo

Eunice Eboserehimen Omonzejie is a Nigerian professor of French and Francophone African Literature and the current vice-chancellor of Ambrose Alli University.

== Career ==
Before her appointment as the Vice-Chancellor of Ambrose Ali University, she was the President of the Ambrose Alli University Chapter of the National Association of Women Academics (NAWACS). In September 2025, she was appointed as the Vice Chancellor of Ambrose Alli University where she succeeded Professor Samuel Olowo.

== Selected publications ==
- "Retelling Human and Non-Human Affiliations in Alain Mabanckou's Mémoires de porc-épic: A Zoocritical Exploration – Bhatter College Journal of Multidisciplinary Studies". Bhatter College Journal of Multidisciplinary Studies – A Peer Reviewed Journal. 2013-12-16.
- Bewaji, John Ayotunde Isola; Harrow, Kenneth W.; Omonzejie, Eunice E. (2017-05-11). The Humanities and the Dynamics of African Culture in the 21st Century. Cambridge Scholars Publishing. ISBN 978-1-4438-9355-8.
- Omonzejie, Eunice (2015). "Repealing Traditional Patriarchy in Two Male-Authored Narratives". Journal of the African Literature Association. 9 (2): 152–187. doi:10.1080/21674736.2015.11728729. ISSN 2167-4736.
