= Victoria Okojie =

Nigerian librarian and administrator (1959–2026)

Dr. Victoria Okojie
- Okojie
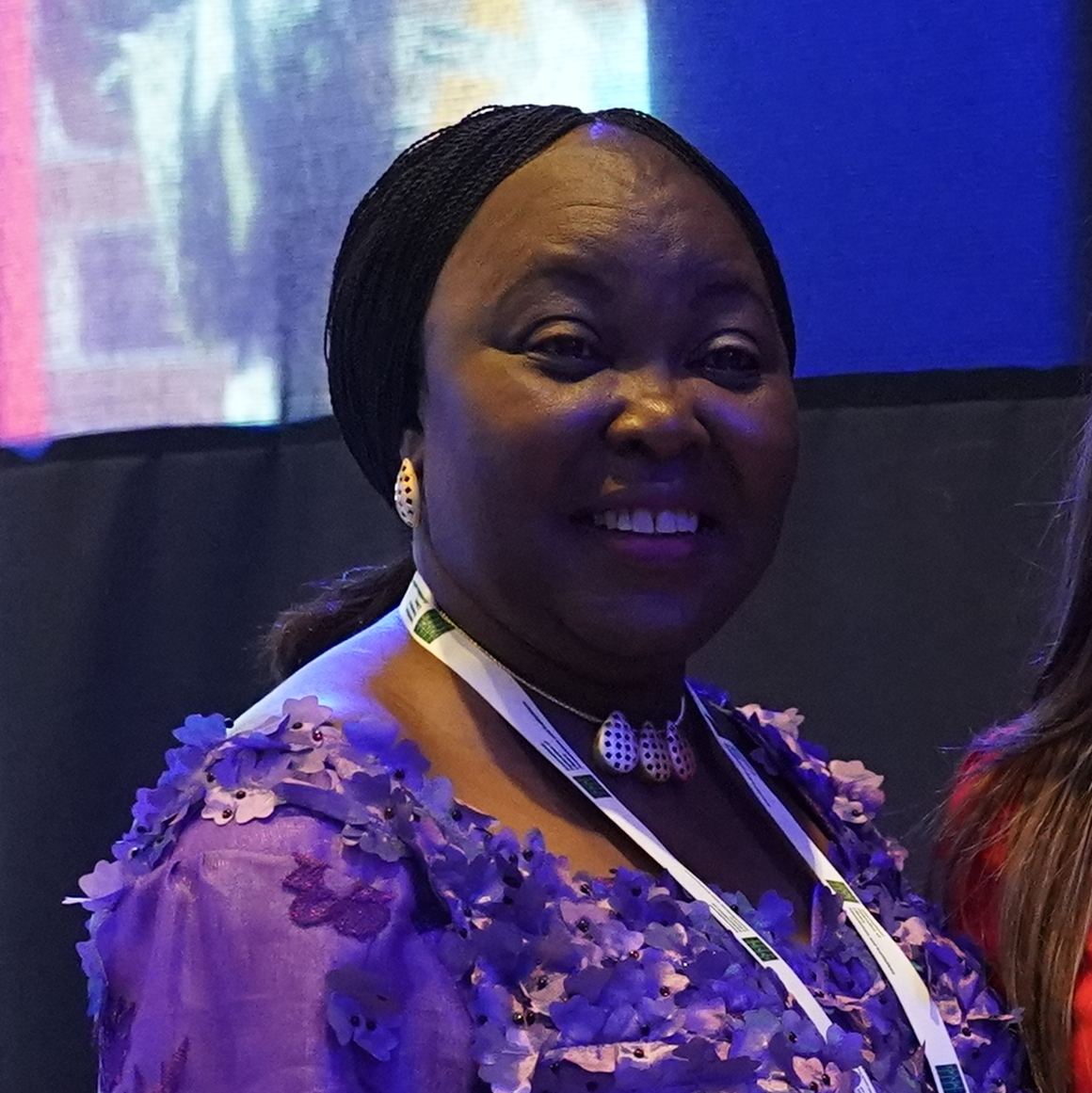
- Okojie in 2023
- Born: 28 November 1959; Nigeria
- Died: 14 September 2026 (aged 66)
- Education: Ahmadu Bello University, University of Ibadan
- Known for: Registrar/CEO of the Librarians' Registration Council of Nigeria
- Website: victoriaokojie.org

Victoria Okojie (28 November 1959 – 14 September 2026) was a Nigerian librarian, academician and administrator. She was the first Registrar/Chief Executive Officer of the Librarians' Registration Council of Nigeria, a parastatal of the Federal Government of Nigeria. Okojie was also a past president of the Nigerian Library Association as well as a member of the governing board of the International Federation of Library Associations and Institutions (IFLA). She was a lecturer at the Department of Library and Information Science, University of Abuja, Abuja.

== Education ==
Okojie completed her master's degree in Library Science (MLS) from the University of Ibadan, Ibadan, before proceeding to Ahmadu Bello University, Zaria, where she completed her PhD in Library and Information Science in 2012.

== Career ==
Okojie's career in librarianship began in 1984 at the University of Ibadan. She joined the British Council in 1994 and rose to the status of a Director at the council, the first Nigerian to do so. During the course of her career, she consulted with the World Bank, the United Nations Educational, Scientific and Cultural Organization, as well as the UK Department for International Development.

In 2009, Okojie joined the services of the Federal Government of Nigeria under the umbrella of the Librarians’ Registration Council of Nigeria, where she became the Registrar/CEO of the Council. She was elected the President of the Nigerian Library Association from 2000 to 2010. Okojie also served as the Chair of the International Federation of Library Associations and Institutions (IFLA) Africa Section between 2011 and 2015. In 2012, she was among twelve global library leaders selected to work with IFLA in the Library and Information Sector. Okojie has served as a member of the IFLA governing Board; the International Advisory Committee, UNESCO Memory of the World Programme; Advisory Committee, Bill & Melinda Gates Foundation Global Libraries Program; and the West African Library Association. Okojie also served as the Program Coordinator of Nigerian Information Professionals Innovation Ambassadors Network (NIPIAN).

== Death ==
Okojie died on 14 September 2026, at the age of 66.

== Awards and honours ==
Okojie won the eminent service award of the Nigerian Library Association in 2000. She also won the "Daughter of Destiny" Award of the Oyo State chapter of the Nigerian Library Association, in addition to the Nigeria Youth Initiative for Transparency, Good Governance, Peace and Social Orientation (NYITGPSO) Merit Award as "Icon of Education" of the year 2012. In 2012, the Commonwealth University, Belize, awarded Okojie an honorary doctorate, for her contributions in the field of Library and Information Science.

She was also a fellow of the Nigerian Library Association (2005); International Visitor Leadership Program (IVLP) of the US Department of State, United States Government, USA (2008), and UNESCO Institute for Lifelong Learning, Hamburg, Germany (2007).

== Selected publications ==
- Gbaje, E. S., and V. Okojie (2011). User-oriented access to knowledge initiatives in Nigerian university libraries. Nigerian Libraries, Vol. 44.
- Ekoja, I. I., V. O. Okojie and H. Emmanuel (2019). The role of the national library of Nigeria in building a virile reading nation: challenges and strategies. In A Discourse on Educational Issues: Festschrift in honour of Five Retiring Professors. Maisamari, A. M. et al. (ed): Abuja, University of Abuja Press. pp. 85–100.
- Okojie, V. and Igbinovia, O. M. (2022). Global perspectives on sustainable library practices. ISBN 9781668459645. p. 376.
- Victoria Okojie, Faith Orim, Oso Oluwatoyin and Adeyinka Tella (2020). Opportunities and challenges of e-book readers and mobile devices in libraries: Experiences from Nigeria. In Adeyinka Tailor (Ed). Handbook of Research on Digital Devices for Inclusivity and Engagement in Libraries p. 208–230.
- Adeyinka Tella, Okojie Victoria, and Olaniyi, T. (2018). Social Bookmarking Tools and Digital Libraries, IGI Global.
- Adeyinka Tella, Victoria Okojie and O. T. Olaniyi (2018). Social bookmarking tools and digital libraries. In Adeyinka Tailor and Tom Kwanya (Eds). Handbook of Research on Managing Intellectual Property in Digital Libraries, p. 396–401.
- Okojie V. and Okiy, R. (2017). Public Libraries and the development agenda in Nigeria. Paper presented at the IFLA World Library and Information Conference in Athens, Greece, pp. 1–12
- Okojie, Victoria and Omotoso, Oladele (2013) Education and training of information professionals: The collaborative role of the Librarians’ Registration Council of Nigeria (LRCN). Paper presented at the IFLA World Library and Information Conference in Singapore.

== See also ==
- Nigerian Library Association
- Librarian's Registration Council of Nigeria
- International Federation of Library Associations and Institutions
