= Adetoun Ogunsheye =

Nigerian librarian (born 1926)

Chief Felicia Adetoun Ogunsheye
- Born: Felicia Adetowun Omolara Banjo; 5 December 1926 (age 99); Benin City, Edo State, Nigeria
- Education: Queen's College; Yaba College of Technology; University of Ibadan; Newnham College, Cambridge; Simmons College
- Alma mater: University College, Ibadan
- Occupation: Librarian
- Relatives: Victor Banjo, Ademola Banjo

Felicia Adetowun Omolara Ogunsheye (née Banjo; born 5 December 1926) is a Nigerian academic. The first female professor in Nigeria, she served as a professor of library and information science at the University of Ibadan.

== Early life and education ==
Adetowun Ogunsheye was born on 5 December 1926 in Benin City, Edo State. She is the elder sister of Lieutenant Colonel Victor Banjo and Ademola Banjo. She had her secondary education at Queens College, before becoming the only female student to attend Yaba Higher School, now Yaba College of Technology, in 1946. In 1948, she received her diploma, becoming the first woman to graduate from the school. She attended University College Ibadan, then went on to Newnham College, Cambridge University, UK, to study Geography on scholarship, earning BA and MA degrees in 1952 and 1956, respectively; she became the first Nigerian woman there. She earned another master's degree in Library Science from Simmons College, Massachusetts, USA, in 1962.

She established the Abadina Media Resource Centre Library of the University of Ibadan. In 1973, she became a professor at the University of Ibadan. Between 1977 and 1979, she was appointed as the dean of faculty of education at the same university. She was the first woman to become a dean in any Nigerian university. She served as a consultant to various organisations including the International Federation of Library Associations and Institutions (lFLA); UNESCO; International Association of School Librarianship (IASL); the International Federation of Documentalists (FID); the British Council and the World Bank.

== Honours ==
She has received the Ford International Fellow, 1961; the Hon. D.L.S. of Simmons College, 1969; the Simmons College International Alumnus Award, 1979; the Fulbright Fellowship for Senior African Scholars, 1980; the Decade of Women Certificate of Merit for Outstanding Achievement, 1985; Fellow, Nigerian Library Association, 1982 and Nigerian Academy of Education, 1985; Hon. Doctor of Letters (D.Litt.) University of Maiduguri, 1990; and the International Education Hall of Fame, Nigeria, 2000. She also holds the chieftaincy title of the Iyalaje of Ile-Oluji, which she first received in 1982.

The University of Ibadan named a female postgraduate hall after her under the administration of Prof. Abel Idowu Olayinka.

== Works ==
=== Academic publications ===
- "The Role and Status of Women in Nigeria", Presence Africaine, Vol. 4 (1960), pp. 33–49.
- A preliminary bibliography of the Yoruba language. Ibadan, 1963.
- "Library education in Nigeria", Library Materials on Africa, Vol. 6, No. 2 (November 1968), pp. 58–60.
- "Problem of Bibliographic Services in Nigeria", Nigerian Libraries, Vol. 5, Issue 2 (1969).
- Nigerian Library resources in science and technology. Ibadan: Institute of Librarianship, University of Ibadan, 1970.
- "Library education at Ibadan University, Nigeria", UNESCO Bulletin for Libraries, Vol. 28, Issue 5 (1974), pp. 259–267.
- "The future of Library Education in Africa", Libri, Vol. 26, Issue 4 (1976), pp. 268–280.
- "Abadina Media Resource Centre (AMRC): A Case Study in Library Service to Primary Schools", UNESCO Journal of Information Science, Librarianship and Archives Administration, Vol. 1, No. 1 (January–March 1979), pp. 29–36.
- (ed.) Nigerian women and development. Ibadan, Nigeria: Ibadan University Press, 1988.
- Bibliographical survey of sources for early Yoruba language and literature studies, 1820–1970. Ibadan: Ibadan University Press, 2001.
- A break in the silence : a historical note on Lt. Colonel Victor Adebukunola Banjo. Ibadan: Spectrum Books Ltd, 2001.

=== Children's books ===
- My alphabet reading book. Ibadan: Spectrum Books. 1993. ISBN 9782462691, 9789782462695
- My first alphabet book: A B C. Ibadan: Spectrum Books. 1996. ISBN 9782462802, 9789782462800
- My first number book: 1 2 3. Ibadan: Spectrum Books. 1996. ISBN 9782462799, 9789782462794
- Lara and Kariba. Ibadan: Spectrum Books 2003. ISBN 9780293930, 9789780293932

== Archives ==
Her archives are now open to researchers and the finding aids can be accessed online.

== See also ==
- University of Ibadan
- Nigerian Library Association
