= Ignatius A. Onimawo =

Nigerian researcher

Former Vice-Chancellor of Ambrose Alli University
- Succeeded by: Osarhieme Osadolor

Personal details
- Born: Ignatius A. Onimawo; July 20, 1957 (age 69) Etsako West, Edo State, Nigeria
- Education: University of Ibadan
- Occupation: Academic
- Profession: Nutritionist

Ignatius A. Onimawo (born July 20, 1957) is a Nigerian academic, nutritionist, researcher, and former vice-chancellor, Ambrose Alli University, Ekpoma, Nigeria.

== Early life and education ==
Onimawo was born in Afowa, Etsako West, Edo State He went to St. James Grammar School, Afuze from 1972 to 1976, and received his first school leaving certificate in 1976. He was admitted into the University of Ibadan in 1977, in the department of agricultural biochemistry and nutrition; graduating with a bachelor of science degree (second class upper division) in 1982. He proceeded for his postgraduate studies in human nutrition (nutritional biochemistry) in the same university, and earned M.Sc. and Ph.D degrees in 1985 and 1995 respectively. In 2012, he obtained a certificate in professional development in nutrition.

== Career ==
Onimawo started his career in 1983 as a lecturer III in the science technology department of the Federal Polytechnic, Idah in Kogi State. In 1999, he became a chief lecturer in the same school leaving in 1999 to join Ambrose Alli University, Ekpoma as a senior lecturer. In 2001, he took up an appointment with Michael Okpara University of Agriculture, Umudike and rose to the rank of a professor in that same university in 2005. He returned to Ambrose Alli University, Ekpoma in 2005 as a professor. In 2024 he was appointed as the Pro Chancellor and Chairman Governing Council of Federal University of Technology Babura, Jigawa State.

== Awards and honors ==
Onimawo has received 27 awards, honors and recognition locally and internationally.

== Services ==
Onimawo has served in various capacities including, chairman, academic staff union, Federal Polytechnic, Idah (1994 – 1998), chairman, senate business committee, Ambrose Alli University, Ekpoma (1994 -1998). Others are national president, Nutrition Society of Nigeria (2002-2006), editor–in-chief for the Nigerian Journal of Nutritional Sciences (2006 - 2008; 2009 – 2012), editor-in-chief, Nigerian Annals of Sciences (2000 - 2001), dean, college of applied food sciences and tourism, Michael Okpara University of Agriculture, Umudike (2006 - 2008), head, department of biochemistry, Ambrose Alli University, Ekpoma ( 2009 - 2011), director of academic planning, Ambrose Alli University, Ekpoma (2011 - 2012), and secretary general, Federation of African Nutrition Societies (an international organization of nutritionists in Africa).

== Personal life ==
Onimawo is a sportsman, sprinter, footballer, hockey player, volleyball player, triple jumper and ludo player. He is a Catholic and is married to Mrs. Jane Onimawo of the department of vocational and technical education, faculty of education, Ambrose Alli University, Ekpoma and they have three children.
