= Hybrid library =

Hybrid library is a term used by librarians to describe libraries containing a mix of traditional print library resources and the growing number of electronic resources.

== Overview ==
Hybrid libraries are mixes of traditional print material such as books and magazines, as well as electronic based material such as downloadable audiobooks, electronic journals, e-books, etc. Hybrid libraries are the new norm in most public and academic libraries.

It seems that the term "hybrid library" was first coined in 1998 by Chris Rusbridge in an article for D-Lib Magazine.

Hybrid libraries evolved in the 1990s when electronic resources became more easily available for libraries to acquire for public use. Initially these electronic resources were typically access to material distributed on media such as CD-ROM or searches of specialised databases. OCLC helped push libraries towards acquiring digital resources by providing a centralized technology resource for participating libraries. Now, with the widespread availability of digital content, it includes Internet resources and documents which are online, such as eprints.

The libraries own and subscribe to different resources in different formats. Some of the common formats are ejournals, serials, print monographs, CD and DVD. The main components of digital library framework are user interfaces, repository, handle system, and search system. The handle system and search system are the major components that should be designed with interoperability features to search across different repositories owned by different vendors. The user interface should be designed in a generic way that it helps library patrons develop a common knowledge to do advanced searches across all repositories.

Hybrid libraries are the new norm for many archivists as well. Digitization has changed the way archivists have gone about preserving historical items. Archivists are now using digital technology to preserve items that were once only preserved by things like microfiche. Archivists now use things like digital imaging which make it possible for researchers to see historical items online.

The emergence of the hybrid library has put a new emphasis on copyright issues for many libraries. The complicated and changing copyright laws in both the United States and the European Union have made it a challenge for many libraries to make sure their patrons are using the digital items lawfully.

Hybrid libraries need staff that are trained in helping patrons navigate the vast amount of information available in the digital age. Librarians working in hybrid libraries have training in electronic media as well as the traditional print forms.

== Issues in hybrid library ==
Some of the issues facing the hybrid libraries are the digital divide, interoperability, collection development, ownership of electronic resources and preservation of digital media.

Any advancement in information technology will be useful only when you know how to use it. The term digital divide is used to describe the gap between those with information technology knowledge and those who do not.

=== Collection development ===
Collection development is another challenge facing the hybrid libraries. The process of collection management in a hybrid library is similar to that of a traditional library. Hybrid libraries follow the same policies and procedures followed in traditional library collection development.

=== Ownership of electronic resources ===
Ownership of electronic resources is another issue facing the hybrid libraries. Ownership of electronic materials is virtual and not physical. There are no clear policies about the ownership of electronic materials once the subscription is cancelled or expired. Libraries have to pay attention to the legal contracts from the database vendors. If the libraries plan on archiving the electronic resources, then there are legal issues related to it. The most prominent legal issues are intellectual property and authenticity of digital information.

=== Preservation of digital media ===
With any new advanced technology related to digital information storage, the main question to be answered is its durability. Digital storage media like disc or tapes deteriorate over time. The main question related to digital preservation is what and how much should be preserved. To make the preservation of digital media cost effective, standardization of different media format is required. Following are the three possible approaches.

=== Technology preservation, emulation, and migration ===
In technology preservation, both hardware and software related to digital information are preserved. This may not be cost effective because changes to hardware and different versions of software need to be either maintained or constantly upgraded.

In emulation, some emulator software programs will mimic the hardware and software of the original data and display in the original format.

In migration, digital information is converted to a standard media with standard format.

== Sources ==
- Oppenheim, C., & Smithson, D. (1999). "What is the hybrid library?" Journal of information science, 25(2), 97-112.
