= Nigerian Library Association =

Professional body for librarians in Nigeria

The Nigerian Library Association (NLA) is a recognized organization for librarians and library and information science educators in Nigeria. Its headquarters is in Abuja (the Federal Capital Territory of Nigeria). It was established in 1962 in Ibadan. It was born from the West African Library Association (WALA). The NLA provides a forum for cooperation, knowledge sharing, and advocacy for the advancement of libraries and information services across the nation among librarians, information scientists, library professionals, and associated stakeholders. Kalu Chioma Okorie (OON), its pioneer president, is one of the first to receive the Fellow Award of the association. The current president of NLA and chairman of the council and president is Dr. Lawal Umar.

== Mission and objectives ==
The mission of the Nigerian Library Association is to:

- Advance the library profession in Nigeria
- Promote the use of libraries and information resources
- Advocate for improved library services for all Nigerians
- Provide professional development opportunities for librarians
- Represent the interests of librarians and libraries at the national and international levels

== Structure ==
Nigerian Library Association has a structured organogram made up of a council that comprises the chairmen of all the state chapters and the Federal Capital Territory; the national librarian/CEO of the National Library of Nigeria; the registrar of the Librarians Registration Council of Nigeria; and the chairmen of all the sections/special interest groups that represent all the compartments of libraries and information centers.

These interest groups are:

- Nigerian Library Association Library and Information Technology Today (NLA LITT)
- Nigerian Library Association, Cataloguing, Classification, and Indexing Section
- Nigerian School Library Section (NSLS)
- National Association of Library & Information Science Educators (NALISE)
- Public Libraries Section (PLS)
- Academic and Research Libraries (ARL)
- Association of Government Libraries (AGOL)
- Association of News Media Librarians of Nigeria (ANLON)
- Association of Women Librarians in Nigeria (AWLIN)
- Nigerian Association of Law Libraries (NALL)
- Medical Libraries Section (MLS)

== Activities ==
NLA participated in the Network of Book Clubs and Reading Culture Promoters in Nigeria (NBRP) on 17 August 2023. The event aimed to promote reading culture and increase the voice of readers in the book ecosystem in Nigeria.

The Nigerian Library Association had a news conference in Abuja in April 2024, where it spoke on the issue of appointing non-librarians to head the various libraries in Nigeria. According to the president of NLA, Dominic Omokaro, "The appointment of non-librarians to head libraries in Nigeria is an anomaly because the profession is highly regulated. We have a government regulatory agency that regulates who a librarian is and what qualifications you need to have to practice as a librarian. So, it becomes an aberration when you take a lawyer, doctor, or engineer to head a library, so we are advocating that our jobs are not taken away from us because we have trained librarians. As I speak, we have over 150 professors of the library, 500 to 1,000 librarians with PHD and over 14,000 members in the association captured and recognized as librarians."

NLA made cases on the completion of the National Library Project, which has been going on for years. There was also the appeal to look into the state library boards by working for the standardization of the public library system in Nigeria. This is to enhance the public library services, as it is described as the "poor man's university". Another intervention by the NLA on the school library system was reported as causing the collapse of education in Nigeria.

As part of calls for revitalization of libraries, NLA President Dr Umar Lawal called urged for quick intervention to revamp the public libraries in Nigeria during the 9th annual conference organized in Kastina State by the National Library for the public libraries.

== Conferences and training ==
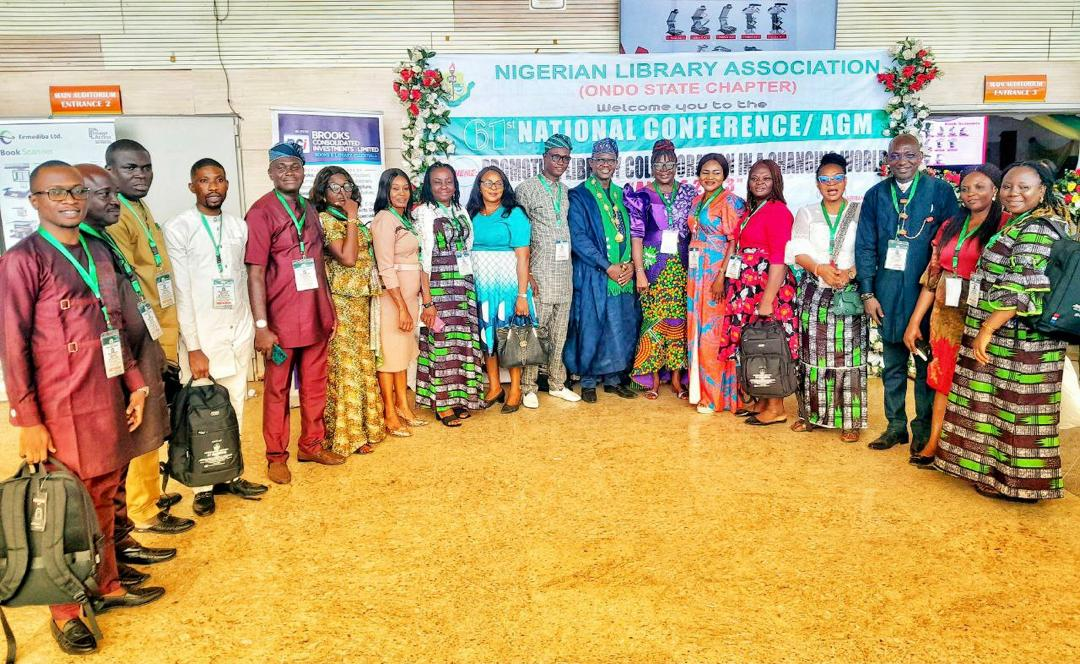
NLA Rivers State Chapter at the National Conference in Akure 2023

NLA plans and provides training, workshops, and seminars on conferences (both national and international) for members. These help to strengthen members' capacities and enrichment of service delivery. For instance, there has been training on digital workspaces to enable members to build their capacities on modern technologies in library services.

The NLA, state chapters, and special interest groups hold numerous conferences and themes throughout the year. The largest conference is the annual conference.

- In 2021, the annual conference was hybrid—physical and virtual. The Academic and Research Libraries (ARLS) of the Nigerian Library Association (NLA) 2021 National Conference/Annual General Meeting (AGM) was scheduled to be held at the University of Nigeria, Nsukka, from 26 to 30 September 2021.
- In 2022, the 60th National Conference/Annual General Meeting was held in Bolton Event Centre, Wuse Zone 7, Abuja, Nigeria, from 3 to 8 July 2022, with the theme: Library and Information Service in the Development of Nigeria: 1962 - 2022.
- In 2023, the 61st National Conference/Annual General Meeting was held at the International Culture and Events Centre (The Dome), Alagbaka, Akure, Ondo State, Nigeria, from 2 to 7 July 2023, with the theme: Promoting Library Collaboration in A Changing World.
- In 2024, the 62nd National Conference/Annual General Meeting was held at the CBN Centre of Excellence, university of Port Harcourt, Rivers State, Nigeria, from 7 to 12 July 2024, with the theme: Promoting Diversity and Inclusiveness through Innovative Library and Information Service Delivery in Nigeria.
- In 2025, the 63rd National Conference/Annual General Meeting was held at the Sir Victor Uwaifo Creative Hub, Airport Road, Benin City, Edo State, with the theme: The 5th Industrial Revolution and the Future of Library and Information Service Delivery in a Changing World.

== Awards and fellowships ==
NLA gives awards and fellowships to members during its annual conferences. One was given to Dr. Modupe Aduke Aboyade CLN, FNLA, FIMPD of Ladoke Akintola University of Technology (LAUTECH), Ogbomoso, in 2023. NLA also appointed brand ambassadors in 2023.

== Publications ==
The Nigerian Library Association publishes newsletters, books, conference proceedings, and journals, including:

Newsletters:

- Nigerian Library Association (2020–2021). My vision for NLA. Newsletter. Vol. 29 (1&2), p. 37 January–December ISSN 1115-1501
- Nigerian Library Association (2018). Making inroads & consolidating. Vol. 27 (1&2) January–June ISSN 1115-1501
- Nigerian Library Association (2017). Breaking new grounds. Newsletter. Vol. 26 (1&2), p. 24 January–June ISSN 1115-1501

Books:

- Nigerian Library Association (2022). The Nigerian Library Association at 60: History, achievements, challenges and prospects. In Balarabe, A. A & Kamba, M. A. (Eds). Zaria: Ahmadu Bello University Press, 386. ISBN 9789785959505
- Nigerian Library Association (1970). Constitution as amended by the annual general meeting, 4 April 1970. Ibadan: Nigerian Library Association, 1970, p. 11. OCLC 25943535

Conference proceedings:

- Nigerian Library Association (2017). Libraries in promotion of national integration for development. 55th National Annual Conference of the Nigerian Library Association. Held in University of Lagos, July, 2017, p. 185. OCLC 1124769808. ISBN 9789789330119
- Nigerian Library Association (2012). Nigerian Library Association at 50: Promoting library and information science profession fors national development and transformation. Held in Abuja, July 15–19, 2012, p. 306. ISBN 9789780697167
- Nigerian Library Association (1999). Information for the sustenance of a democratic culture: A compendium of paper presentations at the 1999 NLA annual National Conference and AGM, p. 138. OCLC 51060091

Journals

- Nigerian Library Association (2021). Nigerian Libraries: Journal of Nigerian Library Association. Vol. 54 (1). January–June. ISSN 0029-0122
- Nigerian Library Association (2019). Nigerian Libraries: Journal of Nigerian Library Association. Vol. 52 (1). January–June. ISSN 0029-0122
- Nigerian Library Association (2019). Nigerian Libraries: Journal of Nigerian Library Association. Vol. 49 (1&2). Jan-Dec. ISSN 0029-0122
- Nigerian Library Association (2016). Nigerian Libraries: Journal of Nigerian Library Association. Vol. 49 (1&2). Jan-Dec. ISSN 0029-0122
- Nigerian Library Association (2012). Nigerian Libraries: Journal of Nigerian Library Association. Vol. 45 (1). June. ISSN 0029-0122
- Nigerian Library Association (2012). Nigerian Libraries: Journal of Nigerian Library Association. Vol. 45 (2). December. ISSN 0029-0122
- Nigerian Library Association (2011). Nigerian Libraries: Journal of Nigerian Library Association. Vol. 44 (1). July. ISSN 0029-0122
- Nigerian Library Association (2010). Nigerian Libraries: Journal of Nigerian Library Association. Vol. 43 ISSN 0029-0122
- Nigerian Library Association (2009). Nigerian Libraries: Journal of Nigerian Library Association. Vol. 42. ISSN 0029-0122
- Nigerian Library Association (2008). Nigerian Libraries: Journal of Nigerian Library Association. Vol. 41. ISSN 0029-0122

== Presidents ==
Past presidents of NLA
Name	Tenure
K. C. Okorie	1962–1964
W. J. Plumbe	1964–1965
E. B. Bankole	1965–1966
S. C. Nwoye	1966–1967
F. A. Ogunsheye	1967–1970
S. B. Aje	1971–1973
J. O. Dipeolu	1973–1975
A. Mohammed	1976–1978
O. O. Ogundipe	1978–1980
A. H. Ningi	1980–1983
J. A. Maigari	1983–1985
J. A. Dosumu	1985–1988
J. O. Fasanya	1989–1993
Gboyega Banjo	1993–1998
Mu’azu H. Wali (Alh.)	1998–2000
James O. Daniel. (Dr.)	2000–2005
Victoria Okojie	2005–2010
Lenrie Olatokunbo Aina (Prof.)	2010–2012
Rilwanu Abdulsalami (Alh.)	2012–2016
Umunna Opara (Dr.)	2016–2019
Innocent Isa Ekoja	2019–2022
Dominic Omokaro	2022–2025
Dr Lawal Umar	2025–present
