= Ambrose Alli University =

University in Edo State, Nigeria

Ambrose Alli University (AAU)
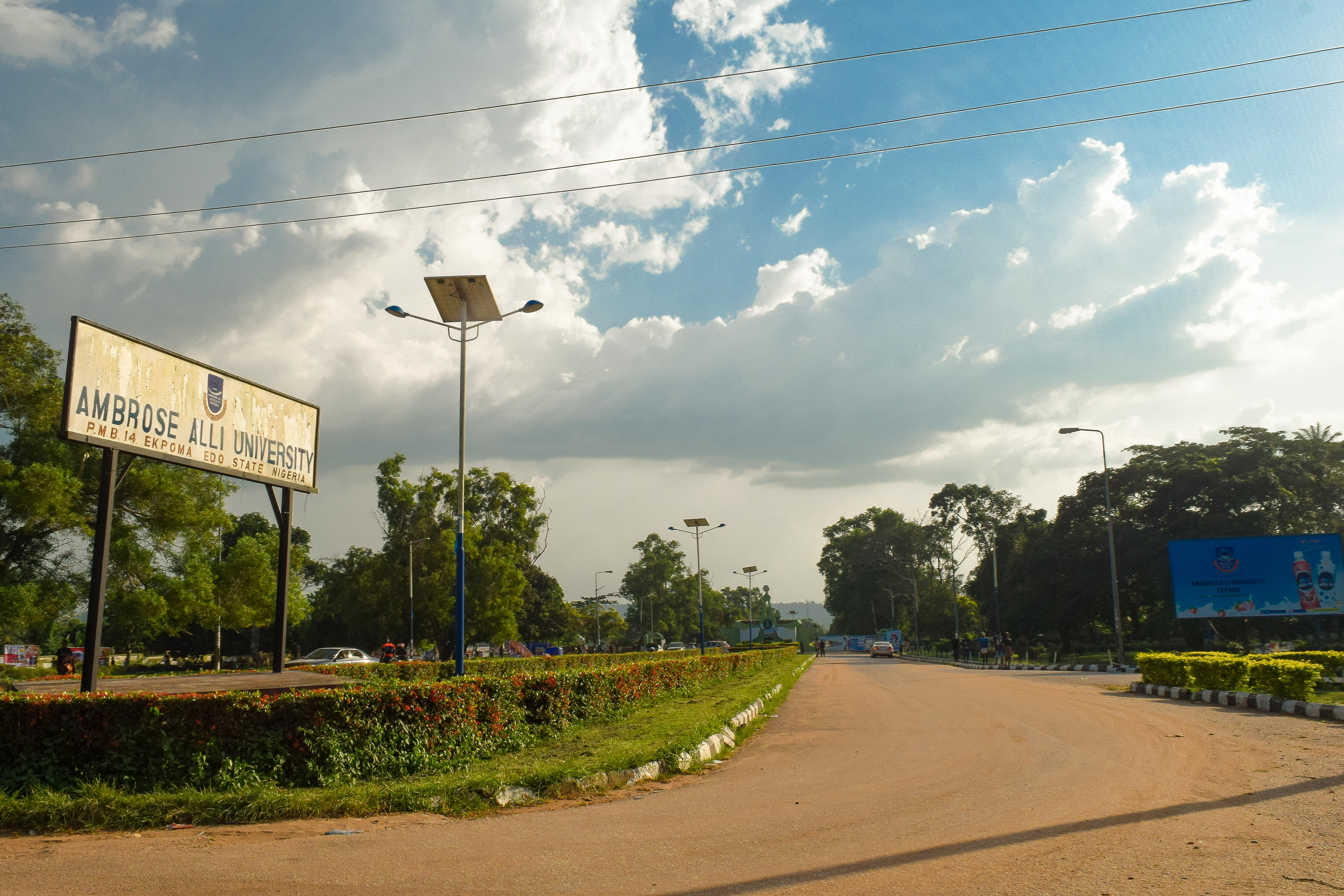
- Ambrose Alli University, front view
- Former names: Bendel State University, Edo State University
- Motto: Knowledge for Advancement
- Type: Public
- Established: 1981 by Ambrose Folorunsho Alli
- Academic affiliations: National Universities Commission (NUC)
- Vice-Chancellor: Eunice Omonzejie
- Location: Ekpoma, Edo State, Nigeria; 6.7446°N 6.0846°E
- Website: www.aauekpoma.edu.ng

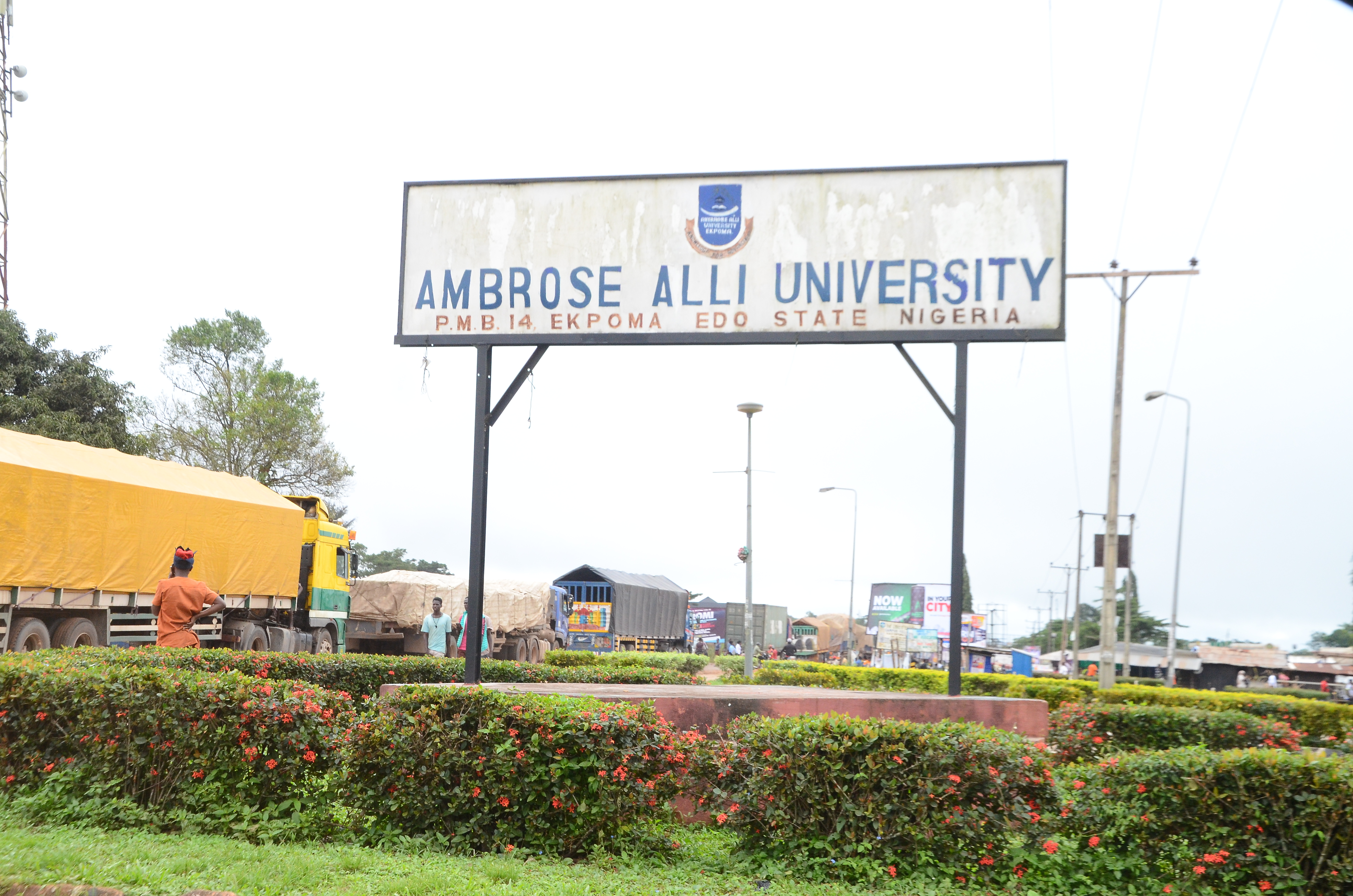
Ambrose Alli University sign post

Ambrose Alli University (AAU) is a state-owned university in Edo State, Nigeria. It was established in 1981 by the governor of Bendel State (now Edo and Delta States), Ambrose Folorunsho Alli. Initially known as Bendel State University, then later known as Edo State University, and finally changed to its present name in commemoration of Professor Ambrose Folorunsho Alli, AAU is accredited and recognized by the National Universities Commission (NUC). The Ambrose Alli University Library houses the information resources for the institution.

The current vice-chancellor of the university is Prof. Eunice Eboserehimen Omonzejie. She took over from Prof Sunday Olowo Samuel, who was appointed on 8 February 2022 by the former Governor of Edo state, Godwin N. Obaseki.

The former vice-chancellor Ignatius A. Onimawo is credited for his unique deployment and application of information and communications technology (ICT) in every aspect of the day-to-day running of the institution.

== Faculties ==
=== Campus ===
- Faculty of Agriculture
- Faculty of Arts
- Faculty of Education
- Faculty of Engineering & Technology
- Faculty of Environmental studies
- Faculty of Law
- Faculty of Life Sciences
- Faculty of Management Sciences
- Faculty of Medical Laboratory Science
- Faculty of Physical Science
- Faculty of Social sciences

=== College of Medicine ===
- Faculty of Basic Medical Sciences
- Faculty of Clinical Sciences

== Library ==
The University Library began operating fully in 1983. The first university librarian was hired in 1982, and the library's initial book collection consisted of 36,509 volumes, including 30,818 books and 5,691 government documents, as well as 369 journal titles. At the time the library opened, there were 24 employees, including 20 junior and 4 senior employees.

In the early years of its existence, the library experienced a series of moves as it searched for appropriate office space. The library's first move was from a temporary office to a temporary administrative building, then it moved to a three-bedroom home, before finally relocating to the Emaudo Campus in December 1982, which was its permanent location. The library was then relocated again in 1987 to the Ujemen Campus, which had a more welcoming academic atmosphere. In 1999, a three-story library facility was officially opened by the head of state, occupying 14,000 square meters.

The library system currently consists of a main library and several outreach libraries and it is a hybrid library system which provides print and non-print information resources.

== Misconduct ==
On 1 December 2021, Ambrose Alli University announced the sacking of four lecturers over gross misconduct. The dismissal was approved after the emergency meeting held .

== Alumni ==
- Samantha Agazuma, Nigerian cricketer
- Alibaba Akpobome, Nigerian comedian
- Benedict Ayade, governor, Cross River State
- Buchi, a comedian
- Aisha Buhari, First Lady of Nigeria, wife of Muhammadu Buhari
- Tony Elumelu, chairman of Heirs Holdings; Nigerian investor and philanthropist
- ICent, singer and songwriter
- Don Jazzy, singer and entrepreneur
- Festus Keyamo, lawyer, socialist, critic, columnist and human right activist
- Samuel Oboh, Canadian architect and president of the Alberta chapter of Royal Architectural Institute of Canada (RAIC)
- Omawumi, singer
- Peggy Ovire, Nigerian actor
- Chris Oyakhilome, founder, Christ Embassy
- Juwon Lawal, founder of Crestal Group

== Photo gallery ==
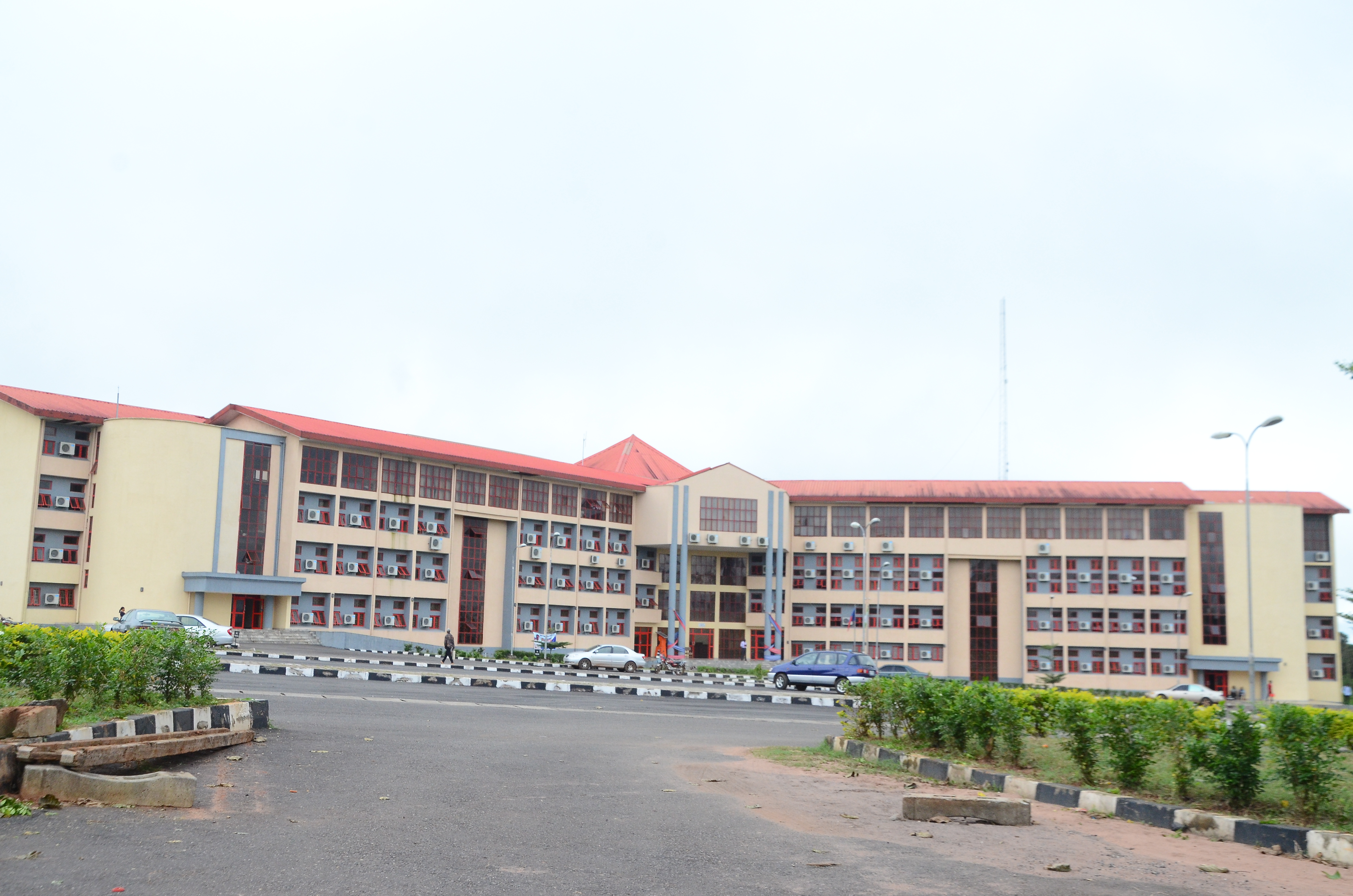

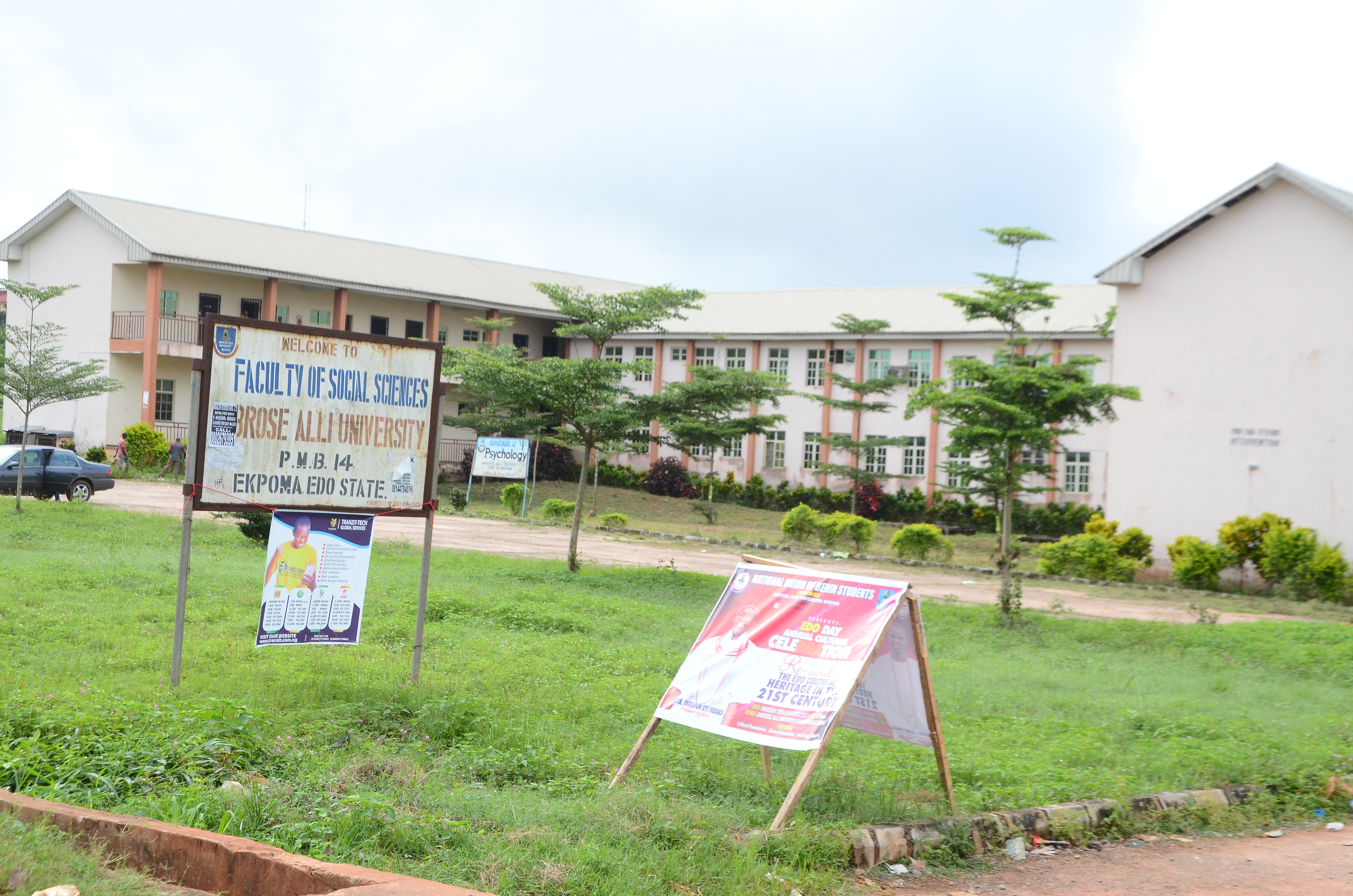

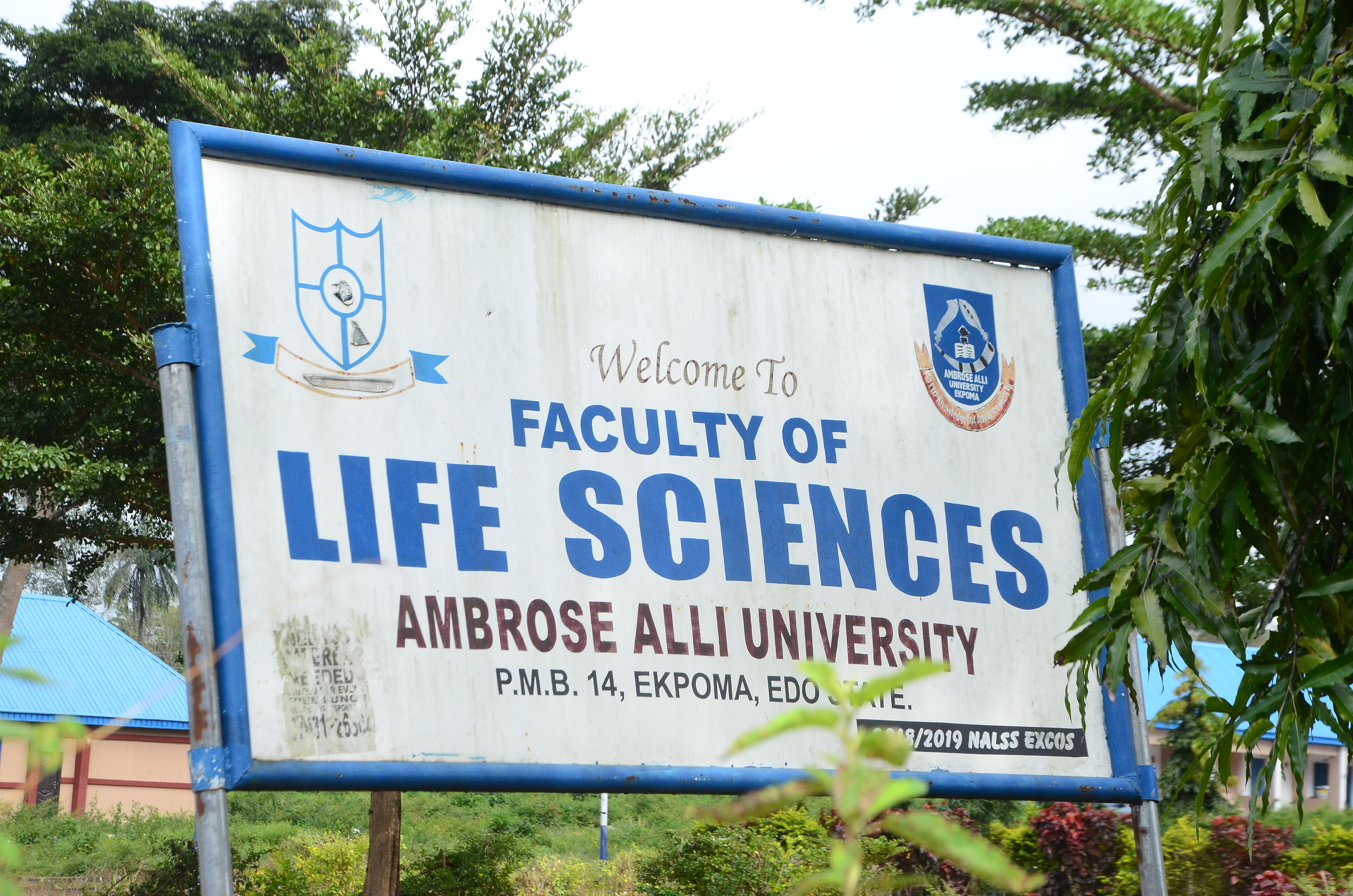

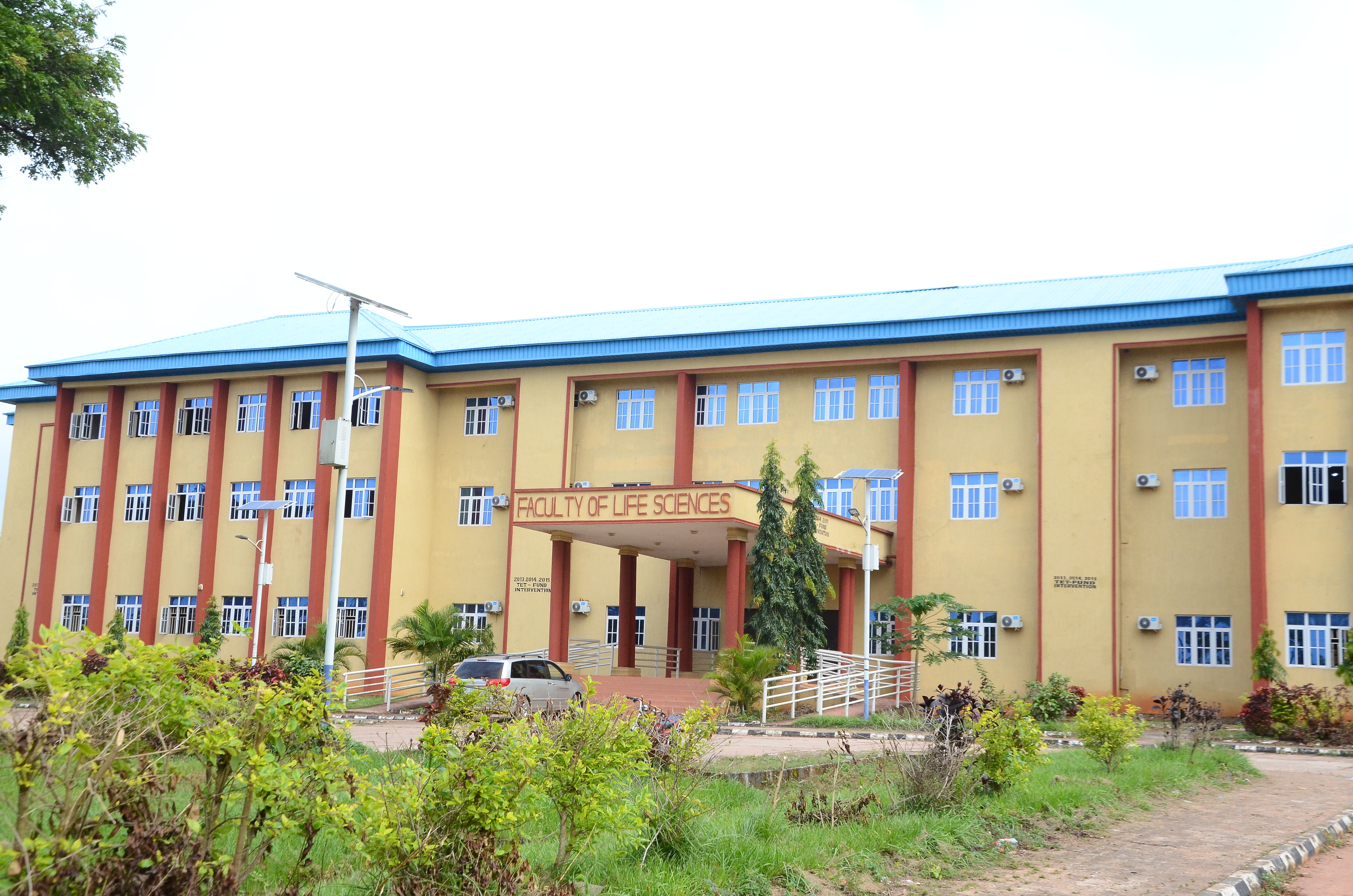

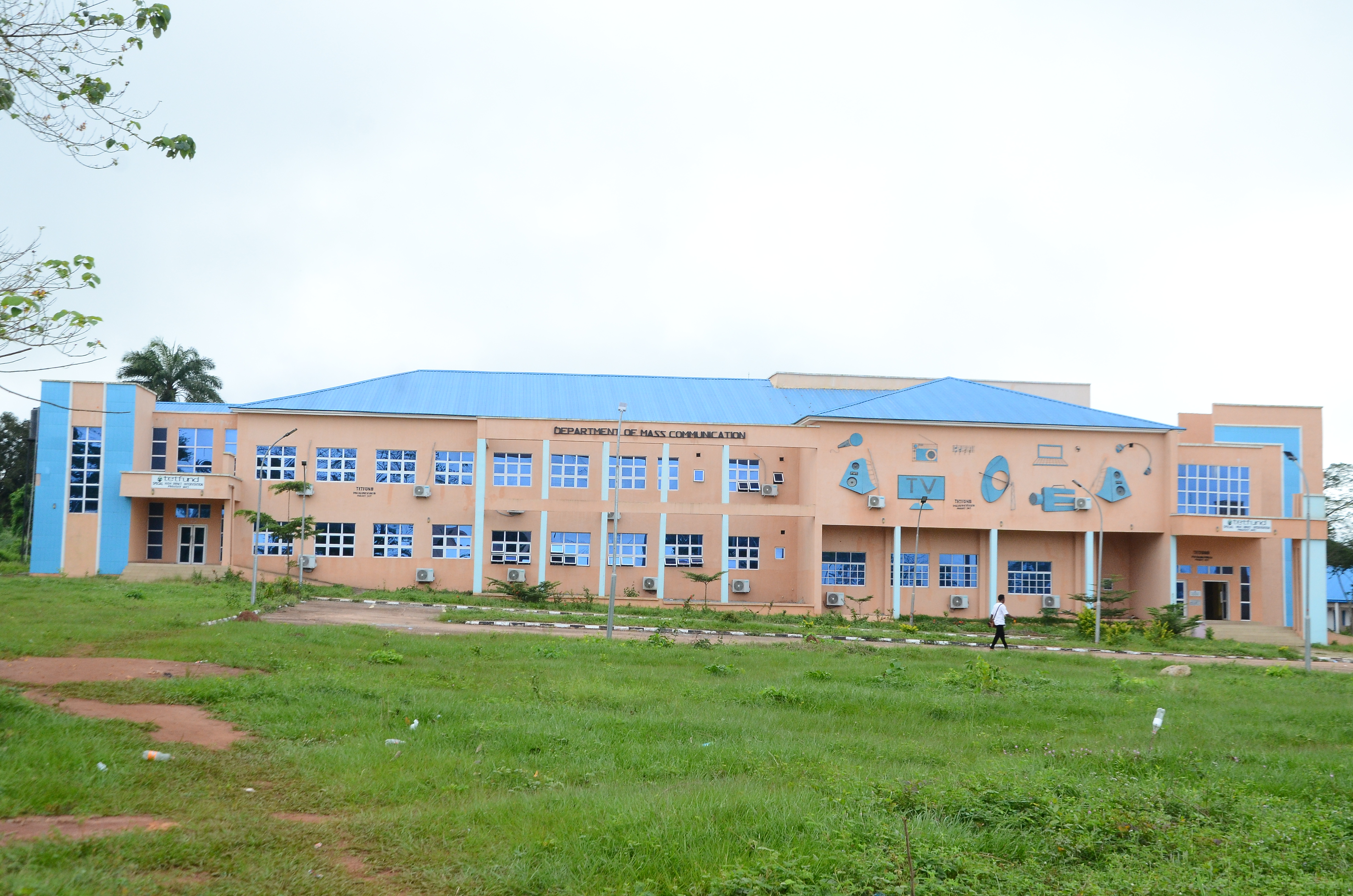

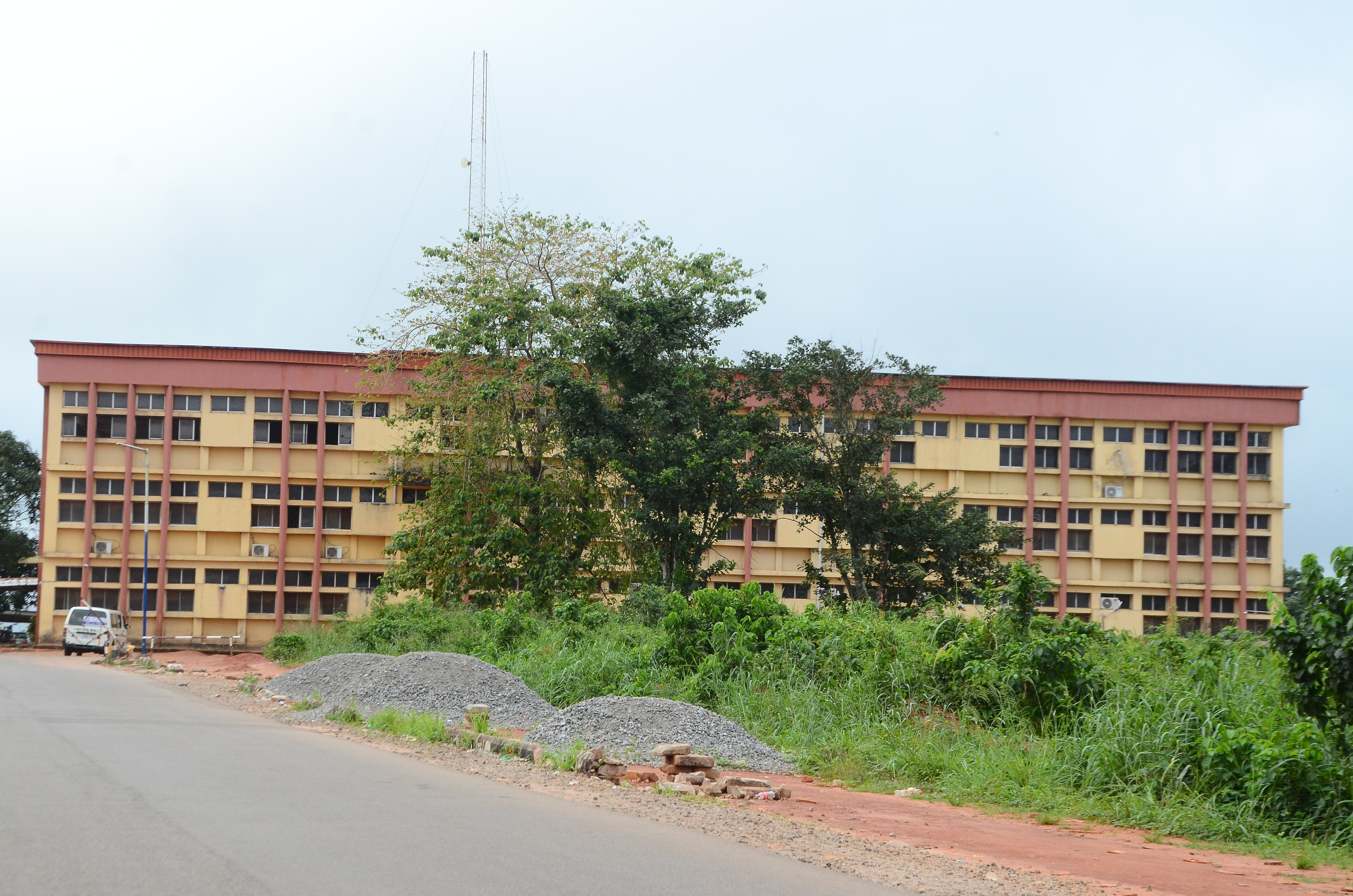

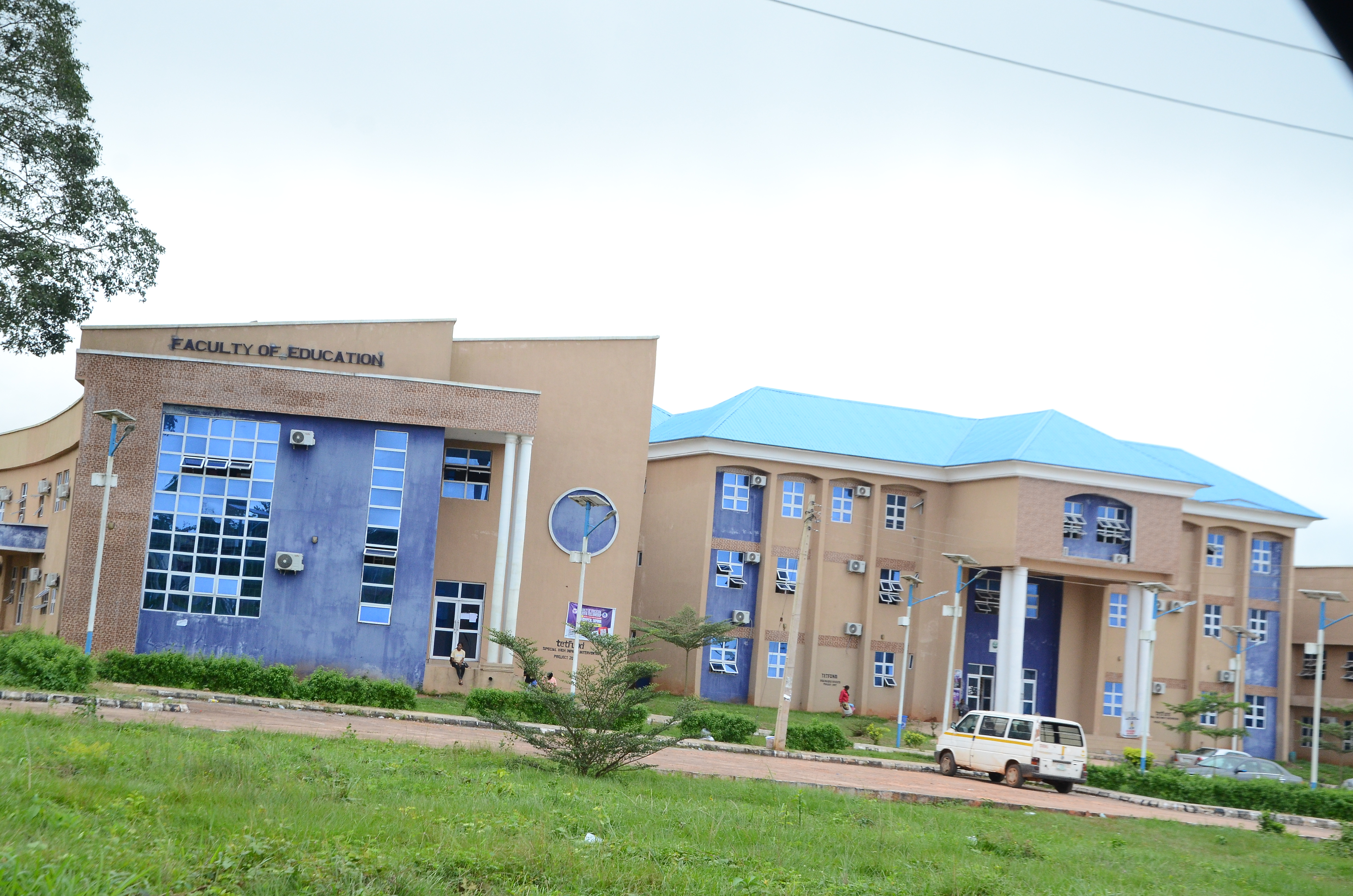

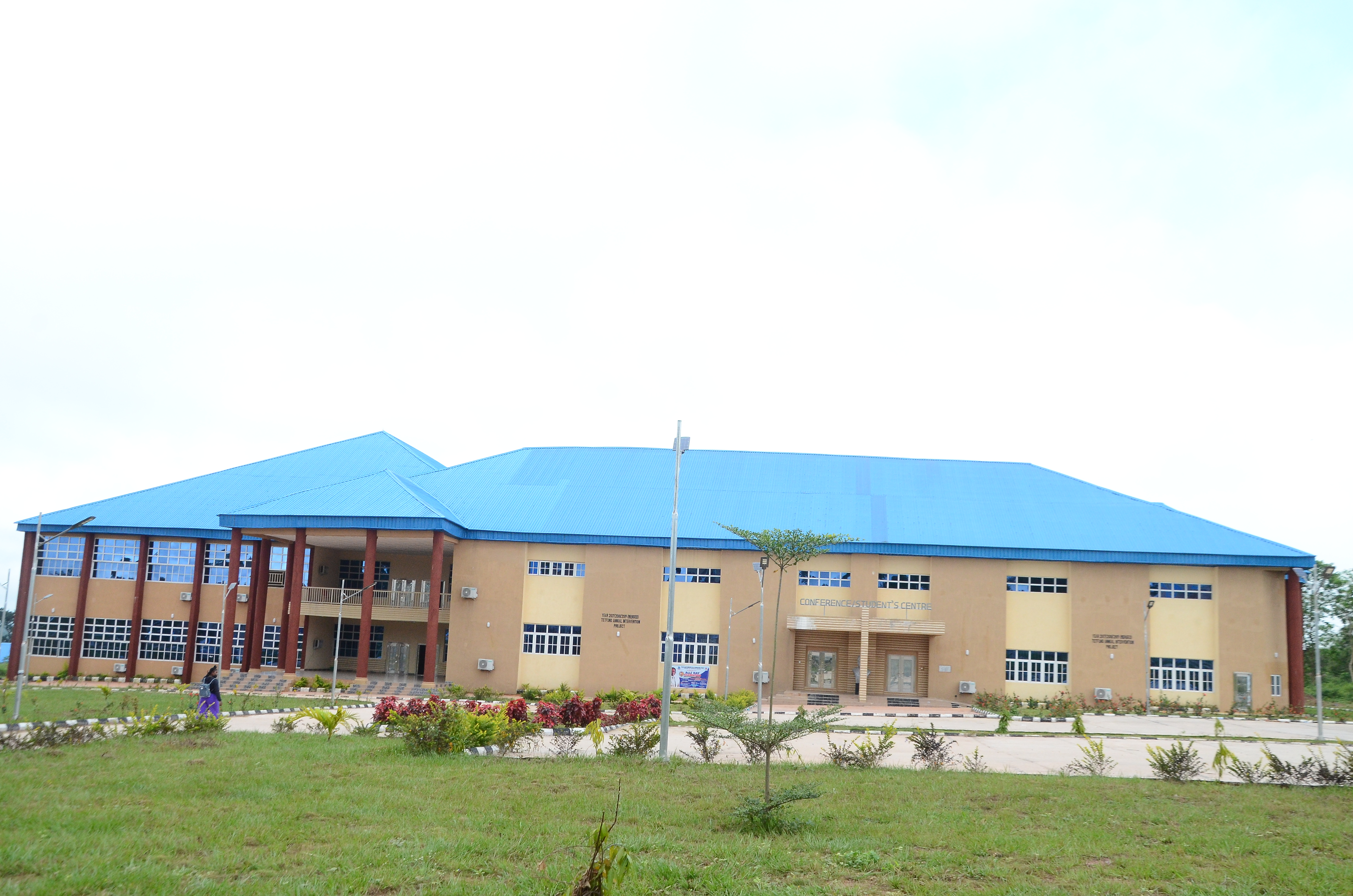
