= List of University of Port Harcourt people =

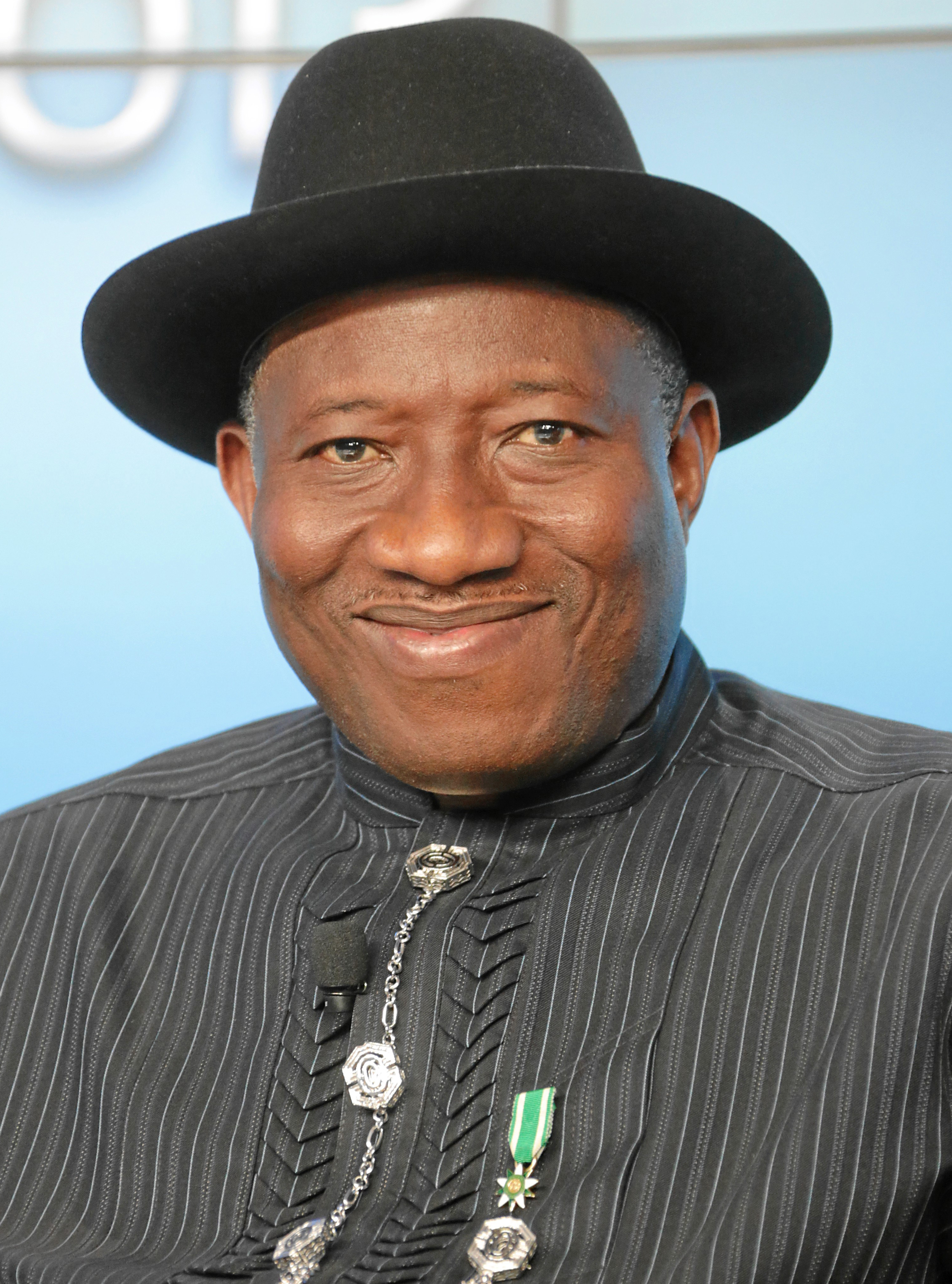
Goodluck Jonathan

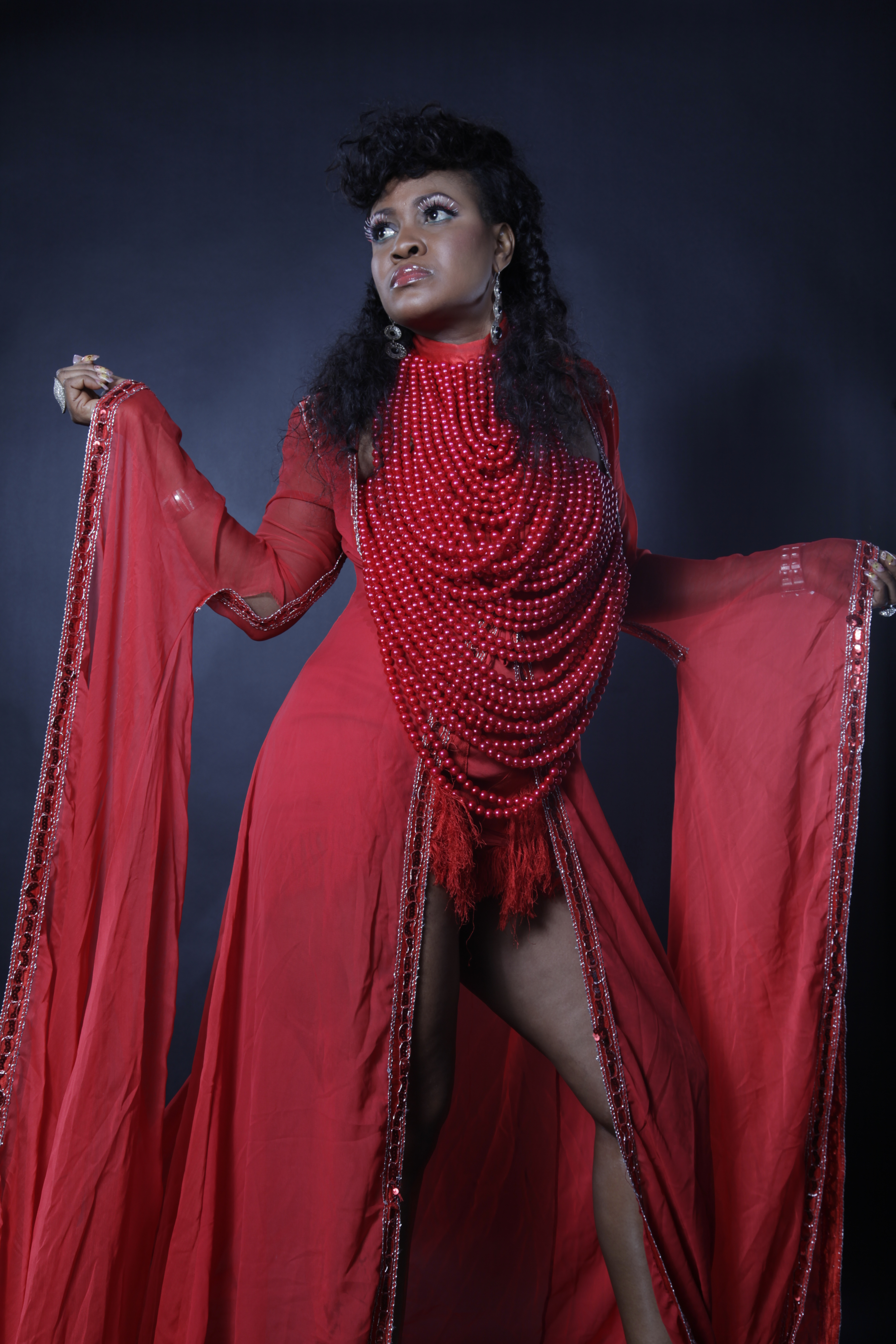
Muma Gee

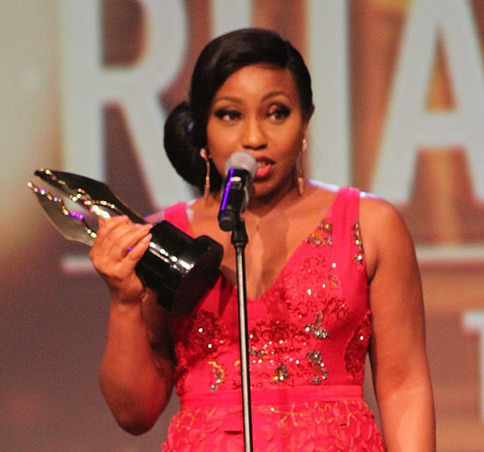
Rita Dominic

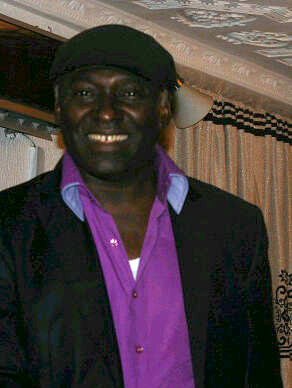
Clem Ohameze

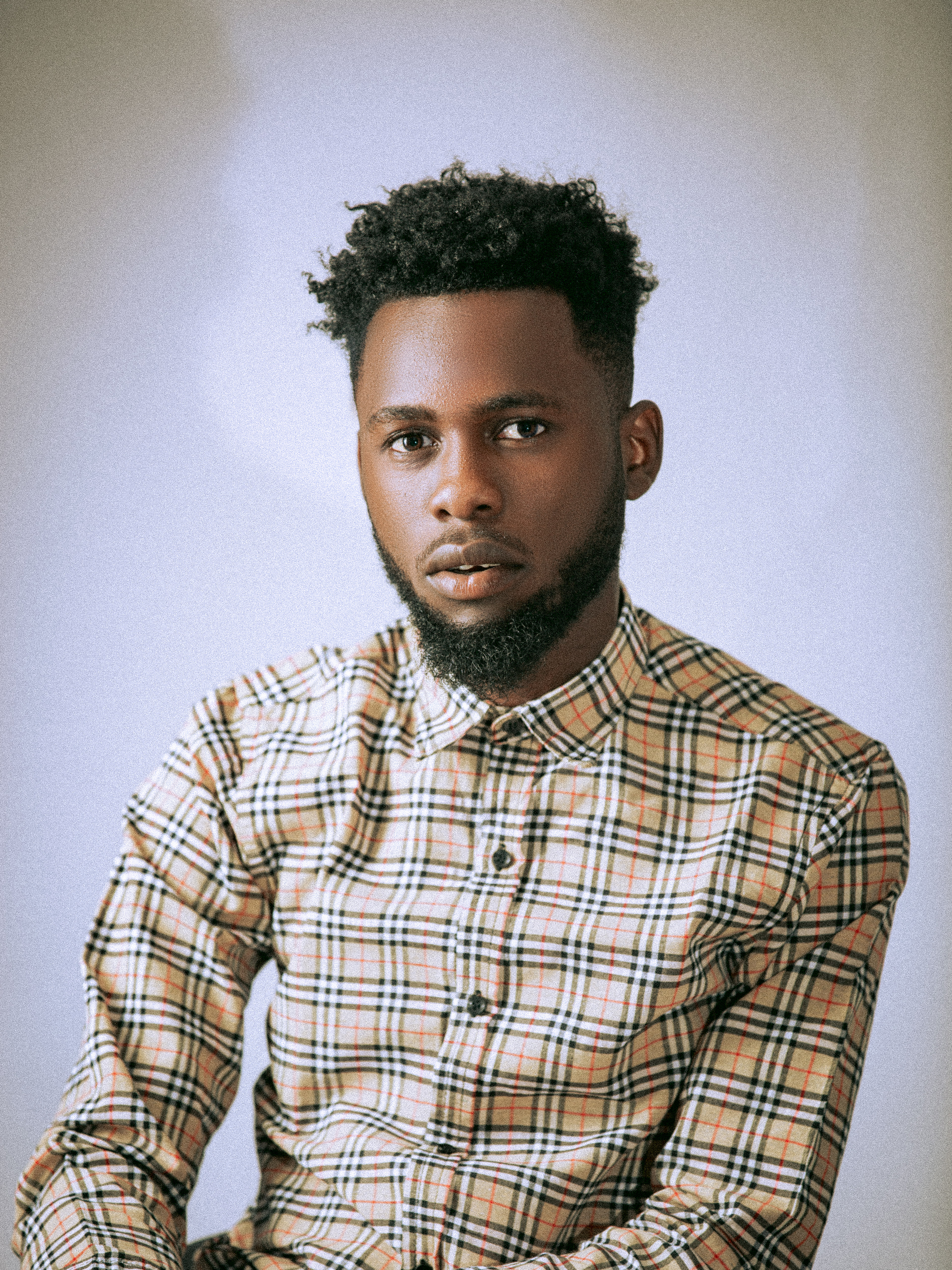
Miraboi

This is a list of notable alumni and faculty from the University of Port Harcourt.

== Alumni ==
=== Arts and entertainment ===
- Andre Blaze - rapper, reality talent show host
- Monalisa Chinda – actress
- Diminas Dagogo – film director
- Agbani Darego – Miss World 2001, model
- Francis Duru - actor
- Rita Dominic – actress
- Linda Ejiofor – actress, model
- Tamara Eteimo - actress, singer
- Muma Gee – singer, actress
- Bimbo Manuel – actor
- Clem Ohameze - actor
- Nwajagu Samuel – Mister International 2024, model
- M Trill – rapper

=== Authors and journalists ===
- Uchechukwu Umezurike – author

=== Business and industry ===
- Emmanuel Agwoje – banker, Chief Executive Officer of Equator Capital Ltd.
- Alex Otti – former Group Managing Director of Diamond Bank
- Tonye Princewill – Chairman of Riverdrill Group of Companies (Nigeria)

=== Diplomacy, government, law and politics ===
- Rotimi Amaechi – Governor of Rivers State
- Innocent Barikor – Member of the Rivers State House of Assembly
- Osinakachukwu Ideozu – Estate Surveyor; Senator
- Godknows Igali - Diplomat, Federal Permanent Secretary and Technocrat
- Goodluck Jonathan – President of Nigeria
- Patience Jonathan – First Lady of Nigeria
- Olaka Nwogu – Member of the House of Representatives
- Silva Opuala-Charles – Commissioner of Finance and Budget
- Emmanuel Paulker – Senator of the Federal Republic of Nigeria
- Dakuku Peterside, politician
- Timipre Sylva – Governor of Bayelsa State

=== Science ===
- Franklin Erepamo Osaisai – nuclear engineer, energy scientist
- Henry A. A. Ugboma – Professor of Maternal-fetal medicine and Chief Medical Director of the University of Port Harcourt Teaching Hospital, Rivers State.

== Faculty ==
=== Current and former ===
- Claude Ake, political science & administration
- I. N. C. Aniebo – novelist and short story writer
- Ayo Banjo – Emeritus professor of English language
- Innocent Barikor – senior lecturer in political science
- George C. Clerk, botany
- Silvia Federici, philosopher
- Robin W. G. Horton – English social anthropologist and philosopher
- Gerald Moore – scholar of contemporary African anglophone and francophone poetry
- Ogbonnaya Onu, chemical engineering
- Ola Rotimi, theatre arts
- Kay Williamson – linguist who specialised in the study of African languages

== Vice Chancellors of the University of Port Harcourt ==
- Joseph Ajienka
- Nimi Briggs
- Owunari Georgewill (current)
- Kelsey Harrison

== See also ==
- List of people from Rivers State
