= Abraham Ayebakepreye Amba Ambaiowei =

Nigerian medical doctor, politician and community leader

Chairman of the National Board for Technical Education
- In office 2001–2004

Rivers State Commissioner of Education
- In office 1979–1980
- Governor: Melford Obiene Okilo
- Preceded by: Prof. Tam David-West

Rivers State Commissioner of Labour and Productivity
- In office 1980–1981
- Governor: Melford Obiene Okilo

Personal details
- Born: 28 February 1940 Amassoma, Southern Region, British Nigeria (now Bayelsa State, Nigeria)
- Died: 6 March 2023 (aged 83) Port Harcourt, Rivers State, Nigeria
- Spouse: Lilian Izonfadei Ambaiowei
- Children: 12
- Education: University of Lagos
- Occupation: Medical Practitioner, Politician and Ijaw Minority Rights Advocate

Abraham Ayebakepreye Amba Ambaiowei MFR JP ( 28 February 1940 – 6 March 2023) was a Nigerian nationalist and advocate for minority rights. He was a medical practitioner and public servant, serving in various capacities at the State and Federal Government levels. He served as Commissioner for Education and Labour, Employment and Productivity in the Old Rivers State. He also chaired the National Board for Technical Education under President Olusegun Obasanjo. Ambaiowei was involved in the movement for the creation of Bayelsa State, serving as Chairman of the Bayelsa Forum and the Bayelsa State Creation Movement. After the state's creation, he became the founding Chairman of the Bayelsa State Founding Fathers Forum.

== Early life and education ==
Abraham Ayebakepreye Amba Ambaiowei was born on the 28th of February 1940 in Amassoma of Southern Ijaw Local Government Area of Bayelsa State, Nigeria to Chief Jacob Ambaiowei Yiworibie of Amassoma in Southern Ijaw Local Government Area of Bayelsa State and Mrs. Priscilia Wuru (née Oghene) from Enhwe in Isoko South Local Government Area of Delta State.

He attended St. Stephen's Primary School, Amassoma in 1950, completed his primary education in 1956, and gained admission into Okrika Grammar School in Rivers State in 1957. In his final year, he was the Senior Prefect of Aggrey house. He left Okrika in 1961 after obtaining his West African School Certificate (WASSCE/GCE).

Amba Ambaiowei moved to Lagos in 1963 and secured a job as an accounts clerk with the Electricity Corporation of Nigeria. In 1964, he enrolled in a part-time evening programme at the Federal School of Science. (FSS), which gave him the opportunity to do an advanced level programme and obtain a federal scholarship. He got his A' Levels from the Federal School of Science in January 1966 and gained admission into the University of Lagos to study Medicine in 1966. Amba Ambaiowei graduated in 1971 with an MBBS degree, becoming the first medical doctor from the entire Southern Ijaw LGA of Bayelsa State

== Medical career ==
Ambaiowei began his medical career by completing numerous deliveries and clinical sessions, gaining recognition from his Head of Department. When Professor Bello Osagie was appointed Provost of the College of Medicine at the University of Benin, he selected Dr. Amba Ambaiowei to work as a Senior House Officer in Obstetrics and Gynaecology at the University of Benin Teaching Hospital.

At the hospital, Ambaiowei advanced to the position of Registrar before moving to the United Kingdom in 1974. He studied at the Royal College of Obstetricians and Gynaecologists, London, from 1974 to 1978. During his time in the UK, he worked as an Obstetrician and Gynaecologist in several hospitals. He served as a Senior House Officer at Edgware General Hospital in North West London from 1974 to 1975 and at Hammersmith Hospital in West London from 1975 to 1976. From 1976 to 1978, he was a Registrar in Obstetrics and Gynaecology at Northwick Park Hospital in Harrow, The Middlesex Hospital London, and St. Mary's Hospital Paddington in West London in 1979. He also held the position of Chairman of the Amassoma Community Union UK branch from 1977 to 1979 and was the Founder and General Secretary of the defunct National Party of Nigeria, UK & Ireland Branch from 1978 to 1979.

== Political career ==
=== Commissioner for Education/Labour and Productivity, Rivers State ===
In 1979, Chief Melford Obiene Okilo, the first civilian Governor of the Old Rivers State, appointed Dr. Amba Ambaiowei as Honourable Commissioner for Education. Dr. Ambaiowei established secondary schools in rural areas and oversaw the conversion of the Rivers State College of Science and Technology Port-Harcourt into a University of Science and Technology. He also served as Honourable Commissioner for Labour, Employment and Productivity from 1980 to 1981, where he provided skills acquisition for youths in craft and vocational centres. Ambaiowei also served as president of the Rivers State Co-operative Financing Agency from 1988 to 1997.

Dr. Amba Ambaiowei balanced his medical practice with his political pursuits. As proprietor and medical director of Amba Hospital, opened in 1982 in Port Harcourt, he provided free health care services. He also established an annex of his hospital in Amassoma to provide medical services to his community.

=== Bayelsa State Creation Movement ===
In 1993, the demand for the creation of an ABAYELSA state from the Old Rivers State was not realized under the military president General Ibrahim Badamosi Babangida, GCFR. However, Dr. Amba Ambaiowei mobilized his colleagues and young graduates under the Bayelsa Forum/Bayelsa State Creation Movement in 1994 to pursue the creation of BAYELSA STATE from the then BALGA – YELGA – SALGA in the Old Rivers State.

Having been involved in the failed Abayelsa state creation movement, Dr. Amba Ambaiowei, as chairman of the Finance Committee, continued to advocate for the self-determination of the Ijaw people. He believed this could be achieved by a lawful demand for the creation of an Ijaw state.

Dr. Amba Ambaiowei, as Chairman of the Bayelsa Forum, convened a meeting on 22 April 1993 to propose a demand for the creation of a state from the local government areas of Brass, Ogbia, Yenagoa, Southern Ijaw, Sagbama, and Ekeremor. After deliberations, a six-man committee was set up to draft modalities for the state creation demand, including proposing a name for the state, a state capital, and a number of local government areas.

On 5 May 1993 the committee presented a draft memorandum of the state creation demand to the general Bayelsa Forum. When the Constitutional Conference and Committee on State/Local Government Creation was established by Gen. Sani Abacha, the final memorandum for state creation was submitted on 29 August 1994 by a delegation led by Dr. Amba Ambaiowei.

Despite challenges and differing opinions on the state capital, an emergency meeting resolved to present a single memorandum to the Mbanefo Committee on State Creation and Boundary Adjustment. On 26 February 1996, at the Alfred Diette Spiff Civic Centre, the Bayelsa Forum, represented by Dr. Amba Ambaiowei and others, presented the Bayelsa State Memorandum with Yenagoa as its capital.

The Movement for the Survival of the Izon Ethnic Nationality (MOSIEND) and the Ijaw National Congress (INC) provided support for the Bayelsa State demand.

On 1 October 1996 Gen. Sani Abacha announced the creation of six new states, including Bayelsa State.

=== Chairman National Board for Technical Education ===
Dr. Amba Ambaiowei was appointed by President Olusegun Obasanjo to serve as Chairman of the National Board for Technical Education (NBTE) from 2001 to 2004. He proposed the establishment of six additional Federal Polytechnics across the nation. He also converted Government Technical School Ekowe in Southern Ijaw LGA of Bayelsa State to a Federal Polytechnic.

=== Member National Political Reforms Conference ===
In 2005, Dr. Amba Ambaiowei represented Bayelsa State at the National Political Reforms Conference. This conference was instituted by President Olusegun Obasanjo and chaired by Honourable Justice Niki Tobi.

=== Affiliations ===
Dr. Amba Ambaiowei was a member of the Nigerian Medical Association, The Nigerian Association of General Medicine and Dental Practitioners, and a Fellow of the Nigerian Institute of Management. He also served as the chairman of the Board of Trustees, Niger Delta Health Foundation, for Comprehensive Rural Health Services in the Niger Delta.

== Awards and recognition ==
=== Awards ===
He received various awards at community, state, and national levels, including the Movement for the Survival of the Ijaw Ethnic Nationality (MOSIEND) Merit Award in 1997, and the Bayelsa State Government Merit Award in 1999, 2001, and 2006. In 2005, he was honoured with the South-South Peoples Distinguished Service Award by the South-South Peoples Assembly.

In 2008, Abraham Ayebakepreye Amba Ambaiowei was bestowed with the Nigeria National Honour of Member of the Federal Republic (MFR) by President Umaru Yar'Adua. He received the Patriot of Ijaw Nation Merit Award in 2011. In 2014, he received the Bayelsa State Broadcasting Corporation (Glory FM's) Hero's Award as part of their 15th anniversary celebration. In 2019, he was awarded the Distinguished Old Boy Award by the Okrika Grammar School Old Boys Association.

On 3 June 2019 Amba Ambaiowei was conferred with the chieftaincy title "Ebe Dou-Pamowei of Bayelsa" by His Royal Highness, Sir Major Graham Naingba (Rtd) JP, Amananaowei of Amassoma, in recognition of his contributions to the welfare and development of Amassoma and his role in the creation of Bayelsa State.

In October 2026, Dr. Amba Ambaiowei, MFR, was posthumously honoured by the Bayelsa State Government during the state's 30th anniversary celebrations. He received the Bayelsa @ 30 Posthumous Award for Contribution to the Sustenance of Ijaw Existence, presented by Governor Douye Diri at the Dinner and Awards Night held on 1 October 2026 at the DSP Alamieyeseigha Banquet Hall in Yenagoa. The award was received on behalf of the family by his son, Tonyi Amba-Ambaiowei, alongside his daughter, Ebiere Daunemigha.

=== Memorial lectures ===
In memory of Abraham Ayebakepreye Amba Ambaiowei's contribution to the Ijaw nation, a public memorial lecture was held at the Niger Delta University auditorium titled "State Creation and Ijaw Identity Management in Nigeria: The Role of Sir Chief Dr Amba Ambaiowei MFR JP" by Prof. Stephen Temegha Olali, Chief Historian and Archivist, Bayelsa State, on 17 May 2023.

On 17 May 2024, a second memorial lecture titled "Revisiting the Fears of the Minorities in Nigeria: 67 Years after the Willinks Commission Report" was delivered by Lt. Gen. Ipoola Alani Akinrinade. As part of the events, Ijaw minority rights activist Joseph William Opigo wrote and recited a poem titled The Cross Bearers, dedicated to the Bayelsa State Founding Fathers. The Memorial lecture was chaired by Rear Admiral Gboribiogha John Jonah (Rtd.), a former deputy Governor of Bayelsa State, and organized by a committee led by Prof. Franklin Erepamo Osaisai, a former Commissioner for Works and Transport in Bayelsa State and former Director-General and Chief Executive Officer of the Nigeria Atomic Energy Commission.

On 23 September 2025, a third memorial lecture titled "Convergence and Coalescence of Federalists as Imperative for the Survival of the Nigerian State" was delivered by Bishop Matthew Hassan Kukah, current bishop of the Roman Catholic Diocese of Sokoto. As part of the events, Niger Delta poet Tonyi Amba-Ambaiowei recited a poem titled "A Legacy is Born", which was first published in the book "How Bayelsa State Was Created" by Dr. Amba Ambaiowei in 2006. The Memorial lecture was chaired by Alabo Sir Dr. Gabriel Toby, a former deputy Governor of Rivers State, and organized by a committee led by Prof. Franklin Erepamo Osaisai. Bayelsa State Governor senator Douye Diri was represented by his deputy; senator Lawrence Ewhrudjakpo as chief host with Ambassador Godknows Igali Chairman of the Pan Niger Delta Forum (PANDEF) amongst other dignitaries in attendance.

== Personal life ==
Sir Dr. Amba Ambaiowei married Lady Lilian Izonfadei (née Owei) in 1972. They had nine children together, and he had a total of twelve children. Lady Lilian Ambaiowei died on 31 May 2020.

An Anglican, Sir Chief Dr. Abraham Ayebakepreye Amba Ambaiowei was baptized and confirmed at St. Stephens Anglican Church Amassoma. He was nominated by Bishop Samuel Elenwo to the Niger Delta Diocese Synod and contributed to the creation of the Amassoma Arcdeaconery. He served as a board member of the Niger Delta Anglican Diocese from 1987 to 1999. On 19 March 2011 he was invested as a Knight of St. Christopher (KSC) at St Peter's Church Deanery Yenagoa by Rt. Reverend Emmanuel Okwuchi Oko-Jaja. He also served as Chairman of the Building Committee at St. Stephens Anglican Church Amassoma.

He was a grand patron of the Boys Brigade of Nigeria (Ogboin Company), served as a member of the Bayelsa State Advisory Committee, and was Chairman of the Southern Ijaw Elders Forum. He was the pioneer Chairman of the Bayelsa State Founding Fathers Forum and served as their Grand Ex Officio at the end of his tenure. He was an active member of the Ijaw National Congress and the Bayelsa State Elders Consultative Forum.

== Death ==
During a routine medical check-up in a private hospital in London, he was diagnosed with late-stage gall bladder cancer (which was metastatic) in November 2022. He returned to Port-Harcourt, Nigeria in January 2023. Amba Ambaiowei died in a private hospital in Port-Harcourt, Rivers State, at the age of 83 on 6 March 2023. His son, author Tonyi Amba-Ambaiowei, wrote a poetic dedication to his father titled Always Remember to Never Forget, which was published in the funeral program.
