= Franklin Erepamo Osaisai =

Nigerian nuclear engineer and energy scientist

Chairman and Chief Executive Officer Formerly Director-General and Chief Executive Officer of the Nigeria Atomic Energy Commission (NAEC)
- In office April 2006 – April 2017

Personal details
- Born: 1 October 1958 (age 68) Bayelsa State, Nigeria

Franklin Erepamo Osaisai (born October 1, 1958) is a Nigerian nuclear engineer, energy scientist and former Director-General and Chief Executive Officer of the Nigeria Atomic Energy Commission

== Life and career ==
He had his secondary education in Bayelsa State, where he obtained the West Africa School Certificate (WASC) in June 1977. He attended the University of Port Harcourt where he obtained a Bachelor of Science (B.sc) degree in chemistry from the School of Chemical Sciences of the university in May 1981. He later received a graduate scholarship award, that earned him a master's and Doctorate (P.hD) degree in Nuclear engineering (1984-1987) from the University of California. He started his career at the University of California as a lecturer before he joined the service of the University of Port Harcourt where he specialized in Nuclear Reactor Engineering. He later became the Director-General and Chief Executive Officer of the Nigeria Atomic Energy Commission (NAEC) under the administration of Chief Olusegun Obasanjo, the former President of the Federal Republic of Nigeria. He had served in several professional organizations.

== Fellowships and membership ==
- Fellow of the Nigerian Academy of Engineering

== See also ==
- List of University of Port Harcourt people
- University of Port Harcourt
