= Prince Ogbogbula =

The Honorable Prince Ogbogbula

Rivers State Commissioner of Youth Development
- Incumbent
- Assumed office December 2015
- Governor: Ezenwo Nyesom Wike
- Preceded by: Owene E. Wonodi

Personal details
- Born: Princewill Ogbogbula; 18 September 1970 (age 56) Ubio Town, Ahoada West, Rivers State, Nigeria
- Party: PDP
- Education: University of Port Harcourt; Rivers State University of Science and Technology

Princewill Ogbogbula (born 18 September 1970) is the current Commissioner of Youth Development in the Executive Council of Rivers State. He was appointed to the position in 2015 by Governor Ezenwo Nyesom Wike.

== Early life and education ==
Born in Ubio Town in Ahoada West local government area, he obtained his West African Senior School Certificate in 1988 from Community Secondary School Erema. In 1995, he graduated from the University of Port Harcourt with a B.A. in Marketing. He then earned a Master of Business Administration from the Rivers State University of Science and Technology in 2000.

== Career ==
=== Youth development ===
He joined the Wike Executive Council as Commissioner of Youth Development in December 2015.

=== Other offices held ===
Ogbobula has held other positions such as:

- LGA party chairman (Ahoada West PDP) group operations manager (Orashi Energy Nig Ltd) managing director – (Paun Nig Ltd)
- Market analyst and market development manager – Bonny Allied Industries Ltd (makers of Rock Cement)
- Marketing representative (south-south & southeast zones) – Bonny Allied Industries Ltd (makers of Rock Cement)
- Club manager – Air Assault Golf Club, Port Harcourt

== See also ==
- List of people from Rivers State
- Youth empowerment
