= Donald E U Ekong =

Nigerian academic

- Born: 31 December 1933
- Citizenship: Nigeria
- Occupations: Chemist; Academic

Donald Efiong Udo Ekong (31 December 1933 – 2005) was a Nigerian professor of Chemistry and the founding Vice Chancellor of the University of the Gambia and was also the vice Chancellor of the University of Port Harcourt of from the year 1977 - 1982.

The University of Port Harcourt Library, also known as the Donald Ekong Library, was named after him in honour of his extensive work for the country, both in teaching and research as well as in university management and development of higher education.
