= Commissioner of Education =

Commissioner of Education is a title used in a number of different governmental education departments or ministries. It may refer to:

- The head of the Rivers State Ministry of Education in Nigeria
- The head of Tanzania's Ministry of Education and Vocational Training
- United States Commissioner of Education, a position that existed historically in the U.S. federal government
- Educational leadership positions in several individual U.S. states, including:
  - The head of the Florida Department of Education
  - The head of the Kentucky Board of Elementary and Secondary Education, a leader of Kentucky Education
  - The chief officer of the Massachusetts Board of Education
  - Commissioner of Education of the State of New York
  - The head of the Texas Education Agency
  - Vermont State Commissioner of Education, leader of the Vermont Department of Education
