= Rivers State Ministry of Youth Development =

Nigerian government ministry

Ministry overview
- Jurisdiction: Government of Rivers State
- Headquarters: 7th Floor, State Secretariat; Port Harcourt, Rivers State, Nigeria; 4°46′21″N 7°1′1″E
- Ministry executive: Princewill Ogbobula, Commissioner; Permanent Secretary

The Rivers State Ministry of Youth Development is a government ministry of Rivers State, Nigeria entrusted with the task of dealing with matters relating to youth affairs in the state. The ministry is mandated to empower the youths statewide and engage in activities that aim to assist them to develop, identify and pursue their goals. The headquarters are located at 7th Floor, State Secretariat building, Port Harcourt.

== Vision ==
The vision statement of the ministry is: "To empower the Rivers State youth to become self-reliant and socially responsible citizens of the state."

== Mission ==
The ministry mission statement is: "To prepare the youths for present and future challenges to achieve socio-cultural and economic well-being for selfless service, responsibility citizenship and effective leadership."

== Mandate ==
1. To articulate relevant programmes of action for youth development in Rivers State.
2. Design guidelines for youth development activities in the state.
3. Coordinate and monitor youth development activities at the state local government area levels of Government and the collaborative partners.
4. Create opportunities for the youth to be involved in decision-making progresses in the matters that affect them, environment and society.
5. Inculcate in the youth, human right values, social justice, equity, fairness and gender equality.
6. Promotion conducive atmosphere for mental, emotional and physical development of the youth.
7. Provide adequate funding for the non-formal training of the youth in life skills.
8. Collaborate with all stakeholders for the funding of youth activities.

== See also ==
- List of government ministries of Rivers State
