= Silva Opuala-Charles =

Nigerian commissioner

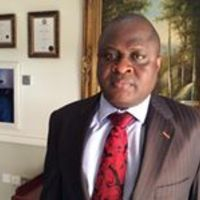

Commissioner for Finance and Budget
- In office July 2007 – June 2011

Personal details
- Born: Silva Opuala-Charles; May 13, 1967 (age 59) Port Harcourt, Nigeria
- Citizenship: Nigeria
- Spouse: Timi Opuala-Charles
- Education: University of Port Harcourt
- Profession: Businessman, Investor, Politician

Dr. Silva Opuala-Charles. FNIM, FNISM, FICEN was the commissioner for finance and budget in Bayelsa state, Nigeria from 2007 to 2012.

== Education ==
Dr. Silva Opuala-Charles attended the University of Port Harcourt. In 1995, he received a Bachelor of Science (Economics) degree with second class honours (upper division). In 1998, he received a Masters of Science (Economics, money and banking). He subsequently earned a doctorate in Economics majoring in monetary economics. He is also a Fellow of the Institute of Certified Economists of Nigeria (ICEN) and a Fellow of the Association of Certified Commercial Diplomats (FCDipl.) London, England. He is also a distinguished Fellow of the Public Management of Nigeria (FIPMN) and a distinguished Fellow of the Institute of the Strategic Management of Nigeria (ISM). He is also a graduate of Breakthrough Program For Senior Executives (BPSE) and an Alumnus of IMD Business School, Lausanne, Switzerland.

In September 2016, Dr Opuala-Charles was awarded the prestigious Global Executive MBA degree from the three affiliate Universities of London School of Economics and Political Science, London; New York University, Stern Business School, New York; HEC Business School, Paris.

== Banking career ==
Opuala-Charles worked in banking for fifteen years, reaching the position of regional manager of the south-south area in the First Inland Bank. He developed a banking product for domestic account mobilization (HYDOM) and opened a branch of the bank in Uyo. He is a fellow of the Institute of Chartered Economists of Nigeria (ICEN). Opuala-Charles is also a fellow of the Association of Certified Commercial Diplomats, (FCDipl), London, England in recognition of his contribution to Nigeria's participation in international trade.

== Political career ==
From July 2007 to June 2012, Opuala-Charles was commissioner for finance and budget in Bayelsa State. Dr Opuala-Charles as commissioner under the leadership of Chief Timipre Sylva, spearheaded a lot of reforms. His stint in government led to the establishment of the Bayelsa State Economic Management Team which he served as a vice-chairman with the Governor as Chairman. He pioneered the domestication of the legislations in Public Procurement, Fiscal Responsibility, Public Private Partnership, Infrastructure Concessioning, Microcredit Management as well as landmark policies in Recurrent and Capital Expenditure Approval Processes, Scholarship Policy, Budget and Treasury Operations Policies.

== Business career ==
Dr. Silva Opuala-Charles is chairman of Alphastar Group Holdings Ltd with its subsidiaries as Alphastar Paints Industries Limited, Alphastar Marine Paints and Coatings Limited and Celebrity Paints Limited. He is also the chairman and Chief Executive of the Lansford Group of Companies; real estate and construction firms with interest in consulting, valuation, mining, investments and asset management. He is also the founder and CEO of Horostar Energy Limited; delivery and distribution of petroleum products mainly; AGO (popularly called Diesel) to independent petroleum marketers, blue chip companies, government parastatals, non-government organization, charitable organization and high net worth individuals with large energy needs.
