= Okodudu Stephen =

Nigerian academic and administrator

Okodudu Stephen Agochi
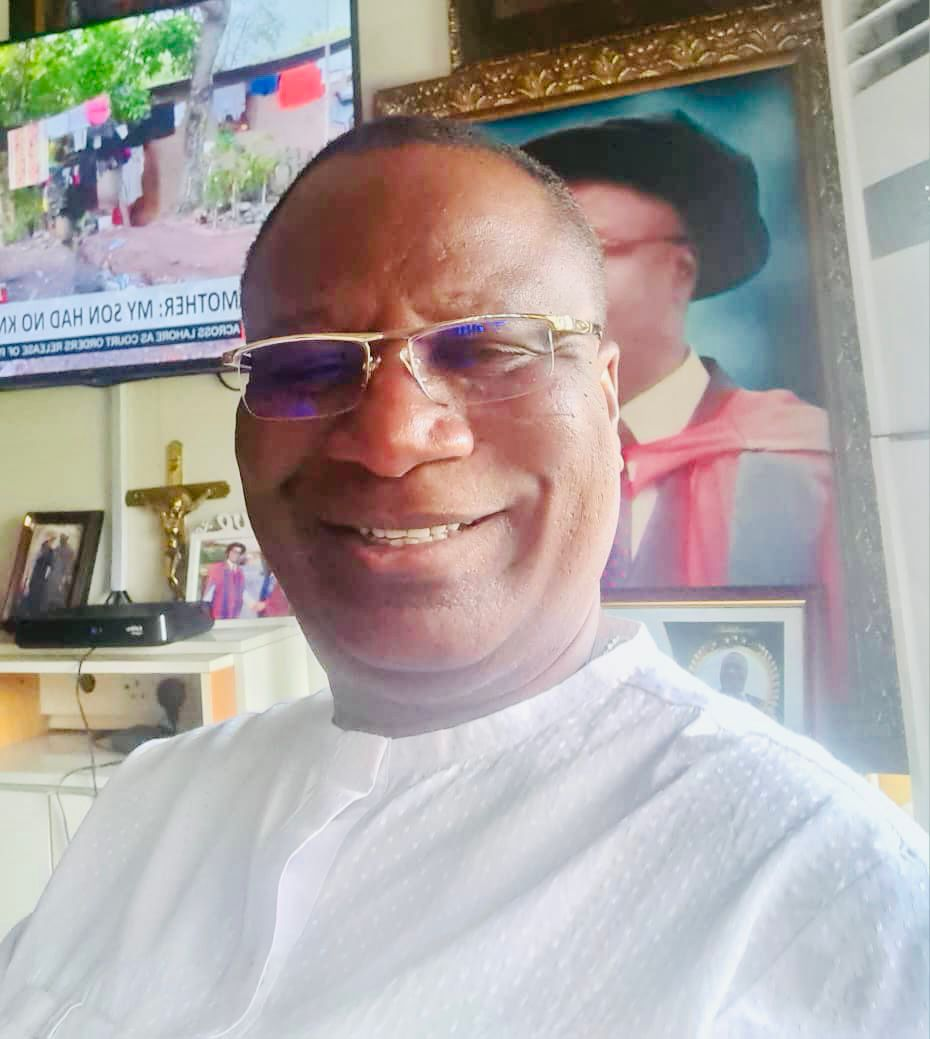

Acting vice chancellor of University of Port Harcourt
- Incumbent
- Assumed office 2020
- Preceded by: Ndowa Lale

Personal details
- Born: Okodudu Stephen Agochi; 13 April 1963 (age 63) Oshimili North, Delta State
- Party: Non-partisan
- Spouse: Ezinneka E. Okodudu

Okodudu Stephen Agochi (born 13 April 1963) is a Nigerian Professor of Sociology and the 8th substantive Acting Vice Chancellor of University of Port Harcourt.

== Early life and background ==
Okodudu wrote his O'level exams at St. Pauls Grammar School, Ebu, Delta state, Nigeria in 1980. He graduated from the University of Port Harcourt where he studied Sociology and also did his master's degree at the same school. He holds a bachelor of Sociology, a master of sociology and a Doctorate of Philosophy in Sociology with specialisation in Sociology of Developing Societies.

== Career ==
Okodudu Stephen started as an assistant lecturer in the sociology department of the University of Port Harcourt and later became Dean, Student affairs in 2004. He was also the Director, University of Port Harcourt College of Continuing Education in 2011. He rose through the University ranks and was promoted to Professor of Sociology on May 4, 2010.

Okodudu also served as a member in the Professional Ethics Committee of the University of Port Harcourt in 2004 and also a member in the Vice Chancellors Steering Committee on the Elimination Of Campus Cults in Uniport in 1998.

On 27 June 2020, he was appointed as the Acting Vice Chancellor of the University of Port Harcourt by President Muhammadu Buhari and served till July 2021 when he handed over to Onwunari Georgewill.

During his tenure as acting vice-chancellor, the university built two COVID-19 treatment centres and testing facilities in the campus.
