= Rivers State Economic Advisory Council =

Nigerian think tank

- Abbreviation: RSEAC
- Formation: 2007
- Type: Governmental organization
- Headquarters: Fleet House, Port Harcourt
- Coordinates: 4°48′31″N 7°0′1″E
- Region served: Rivers State, Nigeria
- Chairman: Prof. Nimi Briggs
- Main organ: RSEAC Council
- Website: Rivers State Economic Advisory Council

The Rivers State Economic Advisory Council (RSEAC) was established on 3 October 2007 to serve as a "policy think-tank" of the Rivers State government. Its main function is to advise the government on important policy issues, particularly those relating to the economic development of the state. At present, the council is composed of 40 members and is headquartered at Fleet House, Port Harcourt.

Emeritus Professor Nimi Dimkpa Briggs is the Chairman of the council since 2007. Other key staff include:

- Sir Joe E. Akpa, Director and Head of Secretariat
- Mrs T. Tamuno, Recorder
- Miss. Tamunopriye Nnah, Research Officer
- Mrs. Ruth C. Boms, Principal Confidential Secretary
