= University of Port Harcourt Library =

Main Academic library of the University of Port Harcourt, Rivers State

- Formation: 1976
- Headquarters: Abuja Campus, Choba
- University Librarian: Prof. Helen Emasealu 2022 - date
- Website: http://library.uniport.edu.ng/

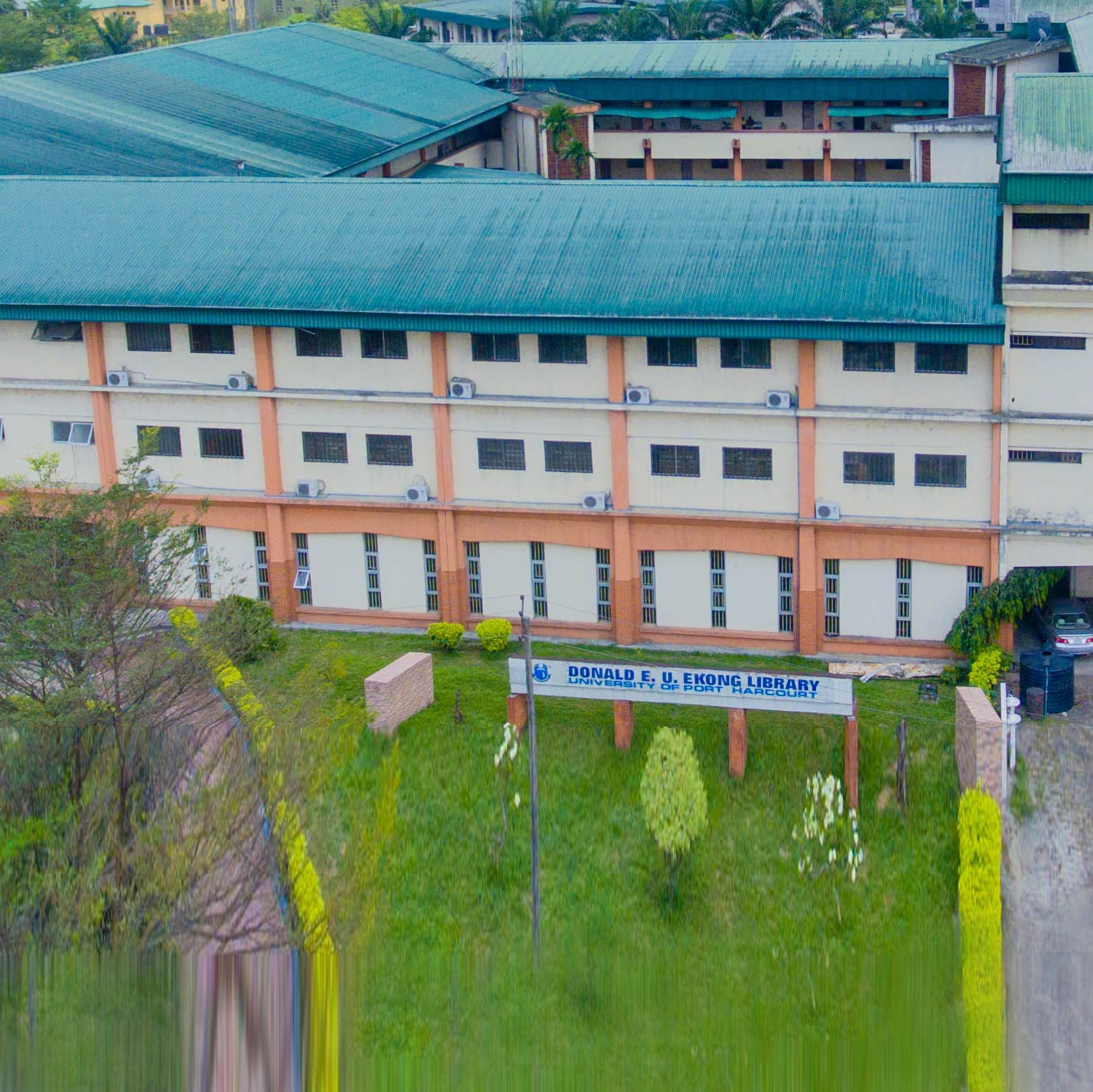
Drone image of the University of Port Harcourt library

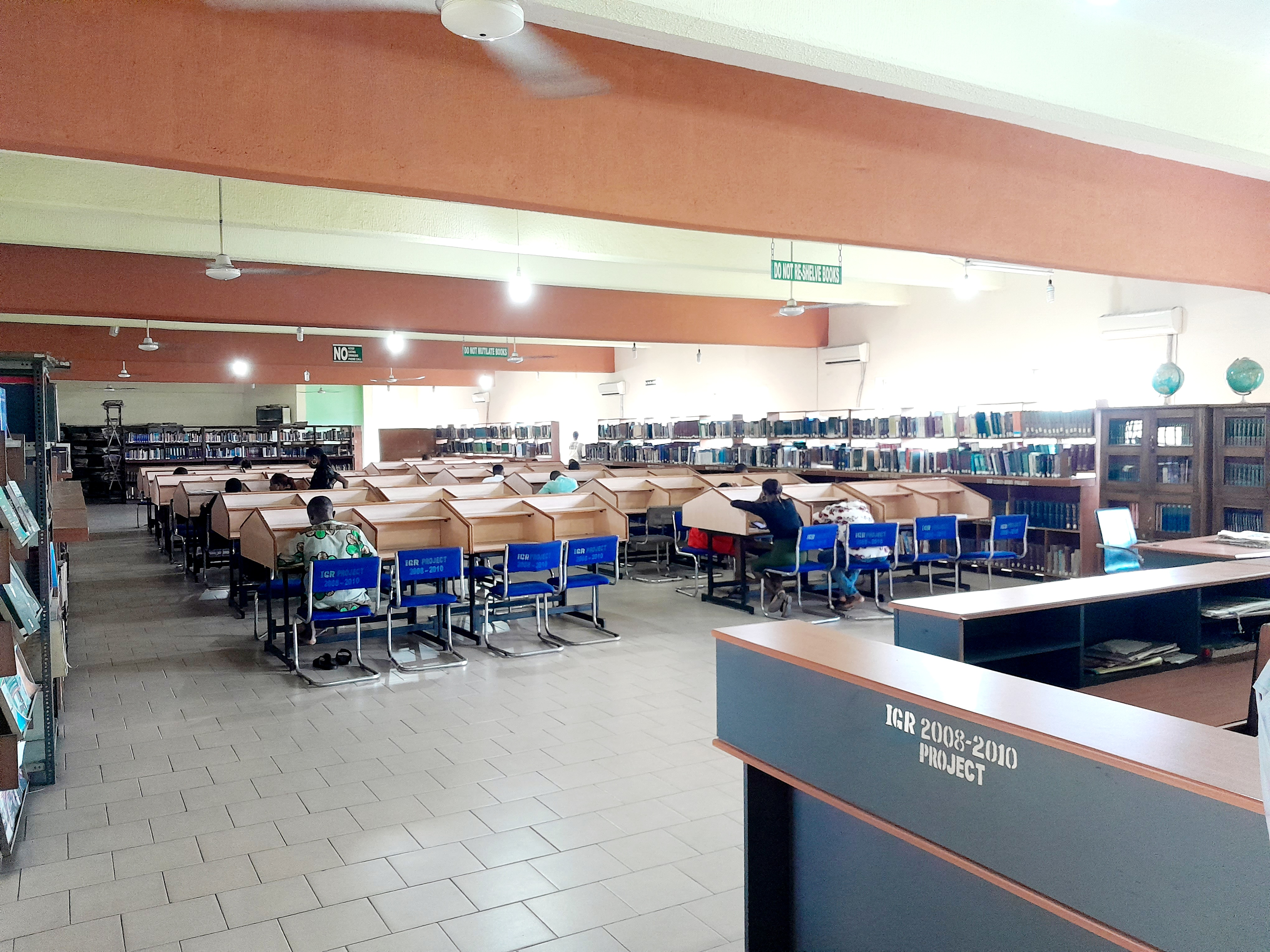
University of Port Harcourt library reference section

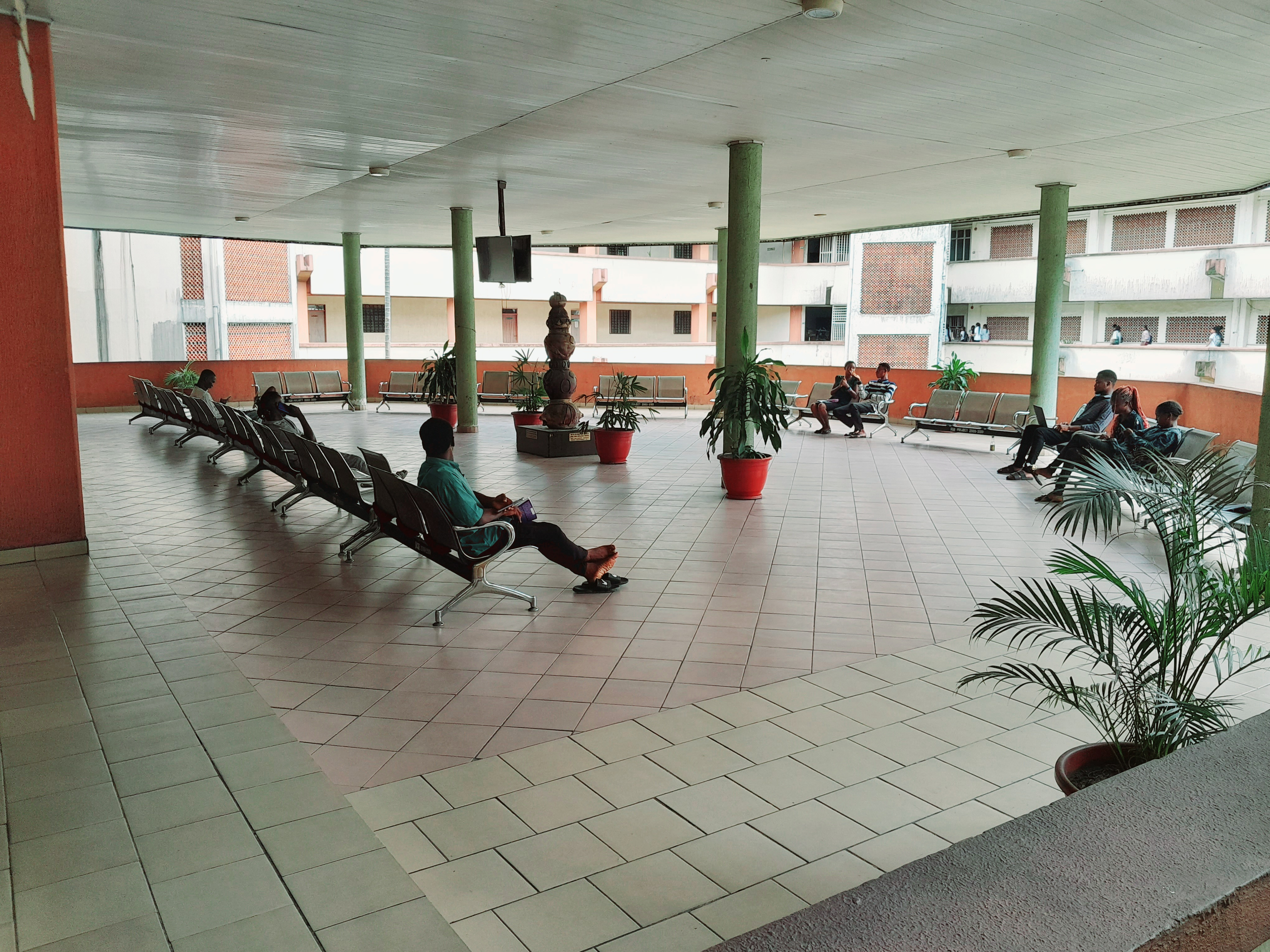
University of Port Harcourt library foyer

The University of Port Harcourt Library also known as Donald E. U. Ekong Library is the academic and research hub of the University of Port Harcourt, Rivers State, Nigeria. The library houses information resources that support the teaching, learning and research of the members of the university community.

Prof. Helen Emasealu is the 6th University Librarian of the University of Port Harcourt Library.

== History ==
The present building of the library consist two wings: Wing A houses two-storey buildings while Wing B houses three-storey buildings.

== Chronology of University Librarian ==
- Helen Emasealu 2022 - date
- Susan Umeozor 2018 - 2021

== Collections ==
Donald E.U. Ekong Library has over 3000 volumes of books and periodicals. The library also has over 400 journals with a despository section for the United Nations Publications.

== Services ==
Other services include laptop loan services by the American Corner section of the University Library. The library also offers book check in and check out services for its registered users.
