= Henry A. A. Ugboma =

Nigerian Professor of maternal-fetal medicine

Professor Henry Ugboma
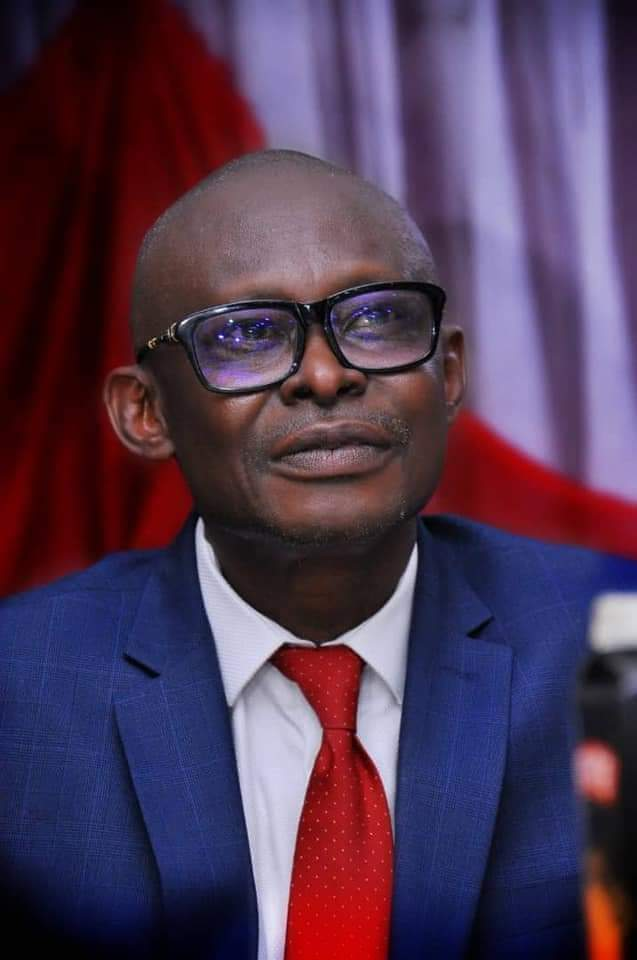
- Born: Henry Ugboma; 15 November 1966 (age 59); Onitsha, Anambra State, Nigeria
- Education: University of Port Harcourt
- Board member of: University of Port Harcourt Teaching Hospital
- Spouse: Dr. (Mrs) Enighe W. Ugboma
- Children: 5
- Website: https://profhenryugboma.com/

Henry Arinze Anthony Ugboma (born 15 November 1966) is a Nigerian Professor of Maternal-fetal medicine and the present Chief Medical Director of the University of Port Harcourt Teaching Hospital, Rivers State.

Henry A. A. Ugboma is an alumnus of the University of Port Harcourt School of Medicine. He is a consultant, Feto-Maternal and infectious gynecologist and a Fellow of the International College of Surgeons – FICS. He had training in Leadership and Administration Processes in Rivers State. In 2016, he obtained a certificate of Professional Management from the Nigerian Institute of Management (charted). He further obtained training in Information and Communication Technology. In 2017, he became a member of the Administrative Staff College of Nigeria (ASCON). Consequently, in 2019, he was conferred a Fellow of the Institute of Health Service Administrators of Nigeria (IHSAN).

== Background ==
Henry A. A. Ugboma was born on 15 November in Onitsha, Anambra State, Nigeria. His parents came from Umu-Awo Ndoni in Ogba-Egbema-Ndoni Local Government Area of Rivers State. He attended the University of Nsukka Primary School in Enugu State (1971–1974), and Government Secondary School (1975–1979) in Ebonyi State. Ugboma then continued his education at the University of Nigeria, Nsukka where he received a Bachelor of Medicine and Surgery (MBBS) degree in 1991.

== Medical сareer ==
After his house-officers' program, and subsequent mandatory one-year NYSC program he further obtained FWACS in 2000 from the West African Post Graduate Medical College. He later became a Fellow of the International College of Surgeons – FICS. Ugboma became a Lecturer (I) in the Department of Obstetrics and Gynaecology, College of Health Science at the University of Port Harcourt, River State from 2003 to 2007.

In 2007, he became a Senior Lecturer in the Department of Obstetrics and Gynaecology, College of Health Science at the University of Port Harcourt. By 2009 he became Acting Head of the same department. He was later known as the focal person in the Prevention of mother to child transmission of HIV (PMTCT) from 2010 to 2017 at the University of Port Harcourt Teaching Hospital, Rivers State.

In 2013, Ugboma rose to the position of Professor of Feto-maternal Medicine in the Department of Obstetrics and Gynaecology, College of Health Science at the University of Port Harcourt after a decade of scientific contributions in the field of medicine. He has attended numerous scientific conferences both within and outside Nigeria. He also presented articles and abstracts at these conferences.

=== Chief Medical Director ===
Ugboma was appointed as the Chief Medical Director of the University of Port Harcourt Teaching Hospital in 2017, and got re-appointed in 2021. Before this appointment, Henry A. A. Ugboma has served in other executive capacities like Head of Department of the Department of Obstetrics and Gynaecology (2016–2017), Collation/Returning Office, National Elections (2003), Member, Transition Committee, Rivers State post-election (2015), Member of Senate the University of Port Harcourt (2013-date), Member, Steering Committee for College Lecture Series (2012), College of Health Sciences representative in the entrepreneurship board, University of Port Harcourt (2013), Presidential Committee Member, National Implementation Committee On The Integration of Out of School Children from South-South and the South-East States Into The UBE Program (2012–2015), Member of board, Consultancy Research and Development Company (CORDEC), University of Port Harcourt (2010–2012), Member, Review Committee on Introduction of Clinical Medicine (2010), Vice-chairman, Accreditation Committee of Braithwaite Memorial Specialist Hospital – BMSH (2003), Member, Committee for Review of the College of Health Sciences Prospectus (2007), Member, Medical and Dental Council of Nigeria, River States (2002–2006), Member, Rivers State Health Management Board (2002–2006), Member/Board of Trustee, Nigerian Project (2005), Vice-chairman, Nigerian Medical Association, Rivers State (2000–2002), chairman, Nigerian Medical Association, Rivers State (2002–2004), President, Hospital Christian Fellowship, UPTH (1998–2000), President, Association of Resident Doctors, UPTH (1996–1998), President-General, Ndoni Ethnic Nationality Worldwide (2004–2006), Justice of Peace, Rivers State Government (2007), and a life-time Member, Association of Resident Doctors UPTH (since 2006).

In 2018, Henry A. A. Ugboma as the chief medical director (CMD) of the University of Port Harcourt Teaching Hospital (UPTH) helped transform the institution into a technological advanced Hospital. He helped purchased new equipment and erected new departmental units.

== Personal life ==
Henry A. A. Ugboma is married to Dr. (Mrs) Enighe Wanayo Ugboma, a radiologist. They have five children. He is a sports enthusiast, and enjoys politics and religious activities. Henry A. A. Ugboma is an open-minded individual with a keen interest in the progress of people around him.

== Publications ==
Ugboma has authored and co-authored medical and scientific research publications in the field of medicine both locally and internationally.
