= Rivers State Universal Basic Education Board =

Government body, Nigeria

The Universal Basic Education Board (UBEB) is a government of Rivers State body entrusted with the responsibility of providing free, mandatory and universal basic education to school-age children in the state. It is headquartered at 16A Elechi Beach Road in Port Harcourt.

The Board was established by the UBE Law (2005), with its operations overseen by the Rivers State Ministry of Education. Some of its primary functions include advising the government on the development of basic education, management of affairs of teaching and non-teaching staff, upholding of children rights to education. Board members including the Chairman are appointed by the Governor. As of January 2015, the chairman of the board is Sir Alli.

== See also ==
- Government of Rivers State
