= Ndowa Lale =

Nigerian academic and publisher

Ndowa N Lale
- Born: River state
- Citizenship: Nigeria
- Occupation: Lecturer

Academic work
- Institutions: University of Port Harcourt

Ndowa N Lale is a Nigerian academic and publisher. He is the 8th substantive Vice-Chancellor of the University of Port Harcourt in Rivers state, Nigeria.

== Education ==
Ndowa received his secondary school education in Ascension High School, Ogale Eleme, Rivers State. From 1972 to 1976 he attended secondary school and Federal Government College, Port Harcourt. He earned his Advanced Level G.C.E. in Biology, Chemistry and Geography from 1976 to 1978 at University of Maiduguri, Maiduguri for B.Sc. (Hons.) Agriculture Crop Science from 1978 to 1981 which he finished with a First Class. He earned his PhD at the University of Newcastle upon Tyne in Agricultural Entomology.

== Career ==
Ndowa is a member of TETFUND Screening and Monitoring Committee under the National Research Fund Intervention. In 2012 he began serving as Vice-Chancellor, Rivers State University of Science and Technology, Nkpolu. He was a Member, Appointments and Promotions Committee, Rivers State University of Science and Technology, Port Harcourt. He served as Editor-in-Chief for the Nigerian Journal of Entomology. He served as Professor of Entomology, Department of Crop and Soil Science Faculty of Agriculture in the University of Port Harcourt.

== Personal life ==
Ndowa is married and has children. He hails from the town of Ebubu in Eleme Local Government Area of Rivers State.

== Employment and position held ==
Year	Company / Establishments	Post Held
2014–date	TETFUND Screening and Monitoring Committee under the National Research Fund Intervention (Science, Technology and Innovation Sub-Committee)	Member
2013–date	Departmental Graduate Studies Committee	Chairman
2012	Contested for Vice-Chancellor, Rivers State University of Science and Technology, Nkpolu, Rivers State	Contestant
2012–date	African Sustainable Development Network.	President
2011–2012	Nigerian Journal of Entomology	Editor-in-Chief
2008–2012	Rivers State University of Science and Technology, Port Harcourt	Member, Governing Council
2008–2012	Disciplinary Committee, Rivers State University of Science and Technology, Port Harcourt	Chairman
2008–2012	Appointments and Promotions Committee, Rivers State University of Science and Technology, Port Harcourt	Member
2008–2011	Consultant to Rivers State Sustainable Development Agency on Songhai Rivers Initiative	Consultant
2006–2011	Graduate Results Verification Committee, University of Port Harcourt, Port Harcourt	Chairman
2005–2011	Faculty of Agriculture, University of Port Harcourt, Port Harcourt	Dean
2005–2009	Board of Governors, University Demonstration	Chairman
2005–2011	Appointments and Promotions Committee, University of Port Harcourt, Port Harcourt	Member
2005–2011	Committee of Provost and Deans, University of Port Harcourt, Port Harcourt	Member
2005–2011	Faculty Board, Faculty of Agriculture, University of Port Harcourt, Port Harcourt	Chairman
2012–date	Governing Council, Eleme Development Authority	Chairman
2005–date	Department of Crop and Soil Science, Faculty of Science, University of Port Harcourt, Port Harcourt	Professor of Entomology
2003–2005	Department of Animal & Environmental Biology, Faculty of Science, University of Port Harcourt, Port Harcourt	Professor of Entomology
2000–2003	Department of Crop Science, Faculty of Agriculture, University of Maiduguri, Maiduguri.	Professor of Entomology
1997–2000	Department of Crop Science, Faculty of Agriculture, University of Maiduguri, Maiduguri	Associate Professor of Entomology
1992–1997	Department of Crop Science, University of Maiduguri, Maiduguri	Senior Lecturer (Agricultural Entomology)
1982–1992	Department of Zoology, University of Port Harcourt, Port Harcourt.	Assistant Lecturer & Lecturer (Agricultural Entomology)
1981–1982	Department of Agricultural Science, Advanced Teachers’ College, Katsina-Ala, Benue State	Lecturer
