= Nigeria Atomic Energy Commission =

The Nigeria Atomic Energy Commission is the agency responsible for the coordination of research and development activities for the use of atomic and nuclear energy in Nigeria.

== Operations ==
NAEC was established in 1976. NAEC partners with the Federal Ministry of Power.

In May 2024, it announced a partnership with Centre for Energy Research and Training to build a nuclear reactor for power generation. In May 2025, Adebayo Adelabu, the federal minister of power of Nigeria, disapproved of NAEC's plan for four 1,200-megawatt nuclear plants, instead suggesting modular reactors that fit Nigeria's decentralized power model.

In April 2025, Korea Hydro & Nuclear Power (KHNP) signed a memorandum of understanding (MOU) with NAEC to expand nuclear cooperation in Africa.
