= Rivers State Ministry of Education =

Nigerian government ministry

Ministry overview
- Jurisdiction: Government of Rivers State
- Headquarters: 7th Floor, State Secretariat; Port Harcourt, Rivers State, Nigeria; 4°46′24″N 7°0′57″E
- Ministry executives: Kaniye Ebeku, Commissioner; Dr. Pat Wudhiga Ogbonnaya, Permanent Secretary
- Website: ministryofeducationriversstate.com.ng

The Rivers State Ministry of Education is a ministry of the Government of Rivers State of Nigeria, created to encourage development of education in the state. The ministry is tasked with the formulation of policies for promoting and realizing effective educational standards, and practices similar to those of other jurisdictions. The ministry is headquartered at the 7th Floor of the State Secretariat Complex in Port Harcourt.

== List of commissioners ==
- Kaniye Ebeku (2015–)
- Alice Lawrence Nemi (2009–2015)
- Ngozi Odu (2003–2007)
- Allwell Onyesoh (1999–2003)
- Celestine Omehia (1992–93)
- Abraham Ayebakepreye Amba Ambaiowei (1979–80)

== Awards ==
Some of the awards won by the ministry include:

- ANCOPSS Award
- Time News Leadership Gold Award
- Babs Fafunwa Education Prize

== See also ==
- Rivers State Ministry of Health
- Universal Basic Education Board
