= Nimi Briggs =

Nigerian academic (1944–2023)

Vice-Chancellor of the University of Port Harcourt
- In office 10 July 2000 – 9 July 2005

Chairman of the Rivers State Economic Advisory Council
- Incumbent
- Assumed office November 2007

Personal details
- Born: Nimi Dimkpa Briggs; 22 February 1944 Port Harcourt (now in Rivers State), Colony and Protectorate of Nigeria
- Died: 10 April 2023 (aged 79) Nigeria
- Spouse: Data Ogi-Briggs
- Children: 3
- Education: University of Lagos (MBBS)
- Website: www.nimibriggs.org

Nimi Dimkpa Briggs (22 February 1944 – 10 April 2023) was a Nigerian academic, scholar and Emeritus Professor of Obstetrics and Gynaecology.

== Education ==
Briggs had his early education at Nyemoni Grammar School Abonnema and Baptist High School, Port Harcourt. Later, he enrolled at Government College Umuahia where he completed his secondary education. In June 1969, he received his bachelor's degree in Medicine and Surgery from the University of Lagos, Nigeria.

== Career ==
Briggs served as the Vice-Chancellor of University of Port Harcourt twice. First, as Acting Vice-Chancellor from 1995 to 1996, before he was appointed again in 2000 serving until 2005. He was the former Chairman Committee of Vice Chancellors of Nigerian Universities and the Chairman of the Board of the National Hospital. Between 2007 and 2008, he was appointed Chairman of the Rivers State Economic Advisory Council and the Rivers State Community Foundation as well as, Director of Centre for Health and Development, University of Port Harcourt.

== Death ==
Nimi Briggs died on 10 April 2023, at the age of 79.

== See also ==
- List of people from Rivers State
