= Godknows Igali =

Nigerian public servant, diplomat, author and scholar

Godknows Boladei Igali is a Nigerian public servant, diplomat, author and scholar. He was appointed by President Umaru Musa Yar'Adua in September 2007 as an ambassador to the Scandinavian countries - Sweden, Denmark and Norway, resident in Stockholm, a position he occupied until he was appointed a Federal Permanent Secretary at the Ministry of Water Resources on 4 May 2010.

== Biography ==
Igali was born in Oporoma town, headquarters of Southern Ijaw Local Government Area, Bayelsa State, Nigeria on 4 April 1960. He hails from Eniwari town, Southern Ijaw Local Government Area, Bayelsa State. He holds a Ph.D. in political and international studies from University of Venezuela, masters in international law and diplomacy (MILD) from University of Lagos and B.A. (Hons) history from University of Port Harcourt. He also has a postgraduate diploma in international relations and undertook professional studies at the Nigerian Foreign Service Academy and the Foreign Service Academy, Islamabad, Pakistan. He is an author and expert on negotiation, conflict resolution, state formation, national integration and sustainable development. In 2005 he received the national honours of the Officer of the Order of the Niger, (OON). He is married to Tokoni Igali and they have four daughters and a son. He holds a chieftaincy title the Ibetariwei "Guardian of the Interests" of Izon. He underwent theological studies under late Bishop Harford Iloputaife at the Bible Faith Training Centre in Lagos in 1989.

=== Appointments ===
A career Diplomat, he has served all around the world since joining the Foreign Service in 1982. During his stay at headquarters, he distinguished himself as an expert on economic diplomacy and served as secretary to about ten (10) Nigerian Economic Missions abroad between 1986 and 1991. He also served severally as secretary, committee on export to West Africa and as special assistant to honourable ministers of foreign affairs. He was appointed the Nigerian consul general to Cameroon (1999–2005). Igali served as the special assistant (special duties) in the Nigerian Presidential Villa (2005–2006) under the President Olusegun Obasanjo administration. During the period, he was also secretary to the presidential committee on money laundering and financial crimes. In addition, he also served as secretary to the presidential subcommittee on review of the public service rules (2005). He was later appointed secretary to the Bayelsa State government in January 2006 and was concurrently named honorary adviser and peace envoy to the President on Niger Delta (2006–2007). He last served as Nigeria's ambassador to the Scandinavian countries, Sweden, Denmark, Finland and Norway (from 2008 to 2010). He was appointed in 2010 as the Federal Permanent Secretary for Water Resources and then redeployed to the Federal Ministry of Power by President Goodluck Jonathan in 2013.

During his tenure as a Permanent Secretary in the Ministry of Water Resources, he undertook the most comprehensive water sector reform policy including the introduction of Public Private Partnership (PPP) in water supply which has become a reference point in the Nigeria water sector today. He also played a major role in bringing the nexus between water, energy and agriculture through the construction of multipurpose dams in Nigeria. These dams include Gurara (which provide portable water, 30 megawatts of power and 3,000 hectares of farmland irrigation) and Kashimbila (which provides portable water, 40 megawatts of power and 4,000 hectares of farmland irrigation) that have been completed.

The deployment of Igali to the Federal Ministry of Power coincided with the period of the privatization of the power sector. As Chairman of the Technical Implementation Committee on the privatization, he supervised one of the most ambitious projects that had never been undertaken by any government world over to a successful conclusion with the handing over of the power sector assets to the new private owners in November, 2013. This is aside from carrying out series of negotiations with electricity workers union that led to the payment of terminal benefits to over 48,000 workers to allow the smooth sail of the privatization process. Several other policies and projects initiated under his watch include: commencement of construction of the 700MW Zungeru Hydro Power Plant; completion of design of the 3,030MW Mambilla Hydro Power Plant; creation of an enabling environment for the injection of private sector capital in the power sector; diversification of Nigeria energy mix to exploit the abundant natural resources in the country; training of 3,600 youths in different skills in the power sector under the National Power Sector Apprenticeship Scheme (NAPSAS), and several others. He also initiated the ‘Operation Light-Up Rural Nigeria Project’ by setting up pilot projects across the country using renewable energy. Seven National Integrated Power Plants were also completed under his stewardship in Alaoji (961MW), Olorunsogo II (675MW), Omotosho II (450MW), Geregu II (434.1MW), Ihovbor (450MW), Ogorode (450MW), and Calabar (562.5).

Igali also sits on the board of several national and international charities and academic institutions, which include Chairman of Governing Board, Foundation for Vocational Education Development Int'l, Chairman of Governing Board, Institute of Natural Resources, Environment and Sustainable Development (INRES), University of Port Harcourt, Member of Governing Council, Bayelsa State Medical University, Yenagoa, Member of Governing Board, Edwin Clark University, Kiagbodo, Chairman Presidential Visitation Panel, Federal University, Lokoja. He was appointed the Chairman of Council and Pro Chancellor, Federal University of Technology, Akure in July 2021.

=== Diplomatic records ===
Igali began his career in the Nigerian foreign service in 1982 and was posted to Czechoslovakia where he remained till 1986. He resumed at the external affairs headquarters after his posting and joined the newly established trade and investment department in the ministry to drive the Structural Adjustment Programme introduced by then Head of State General Ibrahim Babangida in 1986 on the international front. He distinguished himself as an expert on economic diplomacy and served as secretary to about 10 Nigerian economic missions abroad between 1986 and 1991. He also served as secretary, committee on export to West Africa and as special assistant to honourable ministers of foreign affairs. He was appointed the Nigerian consul general to Cameroon (1999–2005).

In Cameroon, he played a key role in the Bakassi Peninsular peace effort following border dispute between Nigeria and Cameroon and the subsequent International Court of Justice judgement of 2002. in 2004–2005, he successfully initiated, negotiated and along with United Nations High Commission for Refugees, (UNHCR) supervised the return of over 60,000 Nigerian Fulani refugees who had for years been displaced into Cameroon following inter-ethnic crisis in the Mambilla Plateau. One of his notable achievements is the regularisation of the immigration papers of Nigerians living in Cameroon.

During his stint as the ambassador to the Scandinavian countries, Igali was concerned about the influx of Nigerian migrants from Italy to the region following a heavy crackdown by the Italian authorities and he campaigned for a rehabilitation programme. He was responsible for exchange of twelve (12) Economic Missions, with visible impact on foreign investment inflow into Nigeria. He also successfully hosted Nigeria's 500-man delegation to COP 15 Climate Change Summit in December, 2009.

He also facilitated investment cooperations in the areas of alternative power generation, telecommunications and ICT. He facilitated an investment delegation. to the Nordic countries led by then Vice President, Goodluck Jonathan in May 2009. He also organised the Bayelsa State Government's Investment forum visit to Finland led by Governor Timipre Sylva and in collaboration with two major Finnish investment organizations Finpro and Finnfund.

=== Niger Delta ===
Igali is actively involved in the issues of the Niger Delta. President Obasanjo appointed him as a special assistant on special duties and honorary adviser and peace envoy to the Niger Delta at the peak of the militancy crisis. During this period, Igali was placed in charge of negotiations with various militant camps following the emergence of the Movement for the Emancipation of the Niger Delta, MEND. Through his engagement with the militants and other stakeholders, the Nigerian General Election of 2007 was able to hold in spite of several threats and tens of kidnapped expatriates were released in the Niger Delta. He served as secretary of the Presidential Council of the Coastal States of the Niger Delta under the President Obasanjo administration and suggested the Amnesty programme in a 27 February 2007 meeting of the council. He was appointed the substantive adviser on the Niger Delta by President Umaru Musa Yar'Adua in June 2007. It was during his tenure as the presidential adviser that the framework for the Niger Delta Amnesty programme was developed. Igali remains engaged in Niger Delta issues as one of the leaders of the Pan-Niger Delta Forum which helped to facilitate dialogue between the Federal Government and the Niger Delta Avengers - a resurgent militant group that had grounded Nigeria's Oil production to 900,000 barrels per day from the budgeted 2.3 million barrels per day.

Igali was appointed recently by the Bayelsa State Governor Seriake Dickson as a member of the Bayelsa Business Council.

=== Publishing ===
Igali is a publisher and author of three books, including; Perspectives on Nation-State Formation in Contemporary Africa - a book about the challenges of state formation and national integration in Africa; Global Trends in State Formation - on the emergence of the modern state system, the disintegration of states, and suggestions that will bring stability and peaceful coexistence; and Signposts to Success - a motivational guide where he analysed the accounts of the biblical King David and some other successful individuals in history.
