= Owunari Georgewill =

Nigerian Professor and VC of Uniport

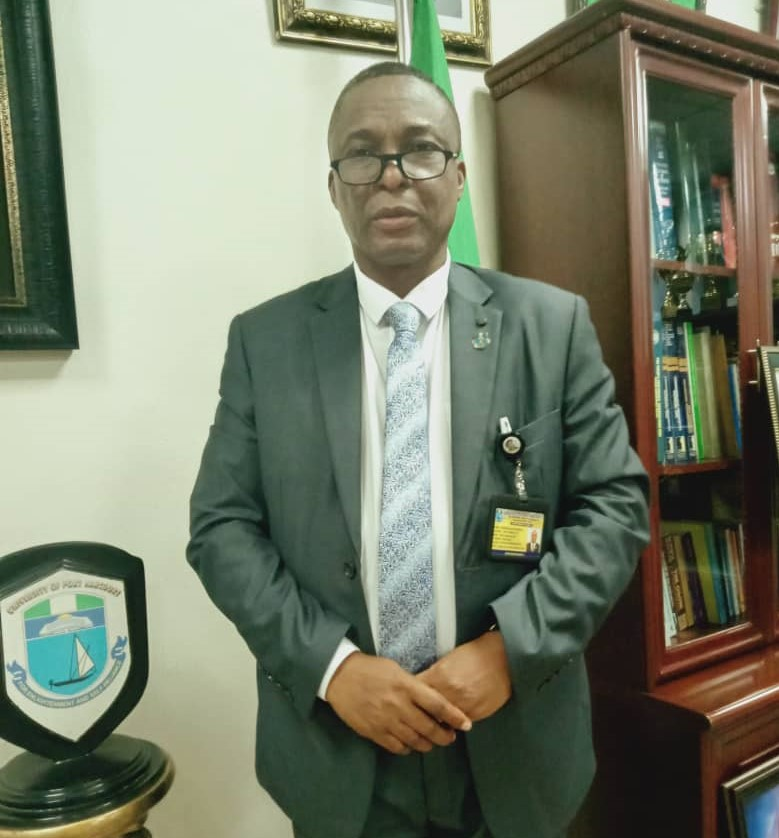

Vice Chancellor of University of Port Harcourt
- Incumbent
- Assumed office 2021
- Preceded by: Okodudu Stephen

Personal details
- Born: Owunari Abraham Georgewill; 15 May 1965 (age 61) Abonnema, Rivers State
- Party: Non-Partisan
- Spouse: Udeme Georgewill

Owunari Abraham Georgewill (born 15 May 1965) is a Nigerian professor of Pharmacology and the 9th substantive Vice Chancellor of University of Port Harcourt.

== Early life and background ==
Owunari obtained his First School Leaving Certificate in 1976 at Bishop Crowther Memorial school, Abonnema. He wrote his O' level exams at Nyemoni Grammar School, Abonnema in 1981 and in 1987, he graduated from the University of Port Harcourt where he studied pharmacology and also did his master's degree at the same school. He holds a bachelor of surgery and a Doctorate of Medicine in Pharmacology and Toxicology.

== Career ==
Owunari Georgewill started as a lecturer 2 in the pharmacology department of the University of Port Harcourt and later became Dean of Faculty of Basic Medical Sciences in 2010. He rose through the ranks and was promoted Professor of Pharmacology on 4 May 2010, at the age of 44. In 2012, he was elected deputy provost of the University of Port Harcourt Medical School and in 2013, he was voted into the Governing Council of the university as a representative. On 2 July 2021, he was announced the 9th substantive Vice Chancellor by the school governing council after screening him and eleven other applicants.

== Personal life ==
Owunari Georgewill is married to Udeme Owunari Georgewill who is an associate professor and they have four children and a grandchild.
