= University of Port Harcourt =

Public university in Port Harcourt, Nigeria

Coordinates: 4.9071°N 6.9170°E

- Former names: University College, Port Harcourt
- Motto: For Enlightenment and Self-Reliance
- Type: Public
- Established: 1975
- Vice-Chancellor: Owunari Georgewill
- Students: 35,000-39,999
- Location: Port Harcourt, Rivers State, Nigeria
- Campus: Urban
- Colours: Blue and white
- Nickname: Uniport
- Website: www.uniport.edu.ng

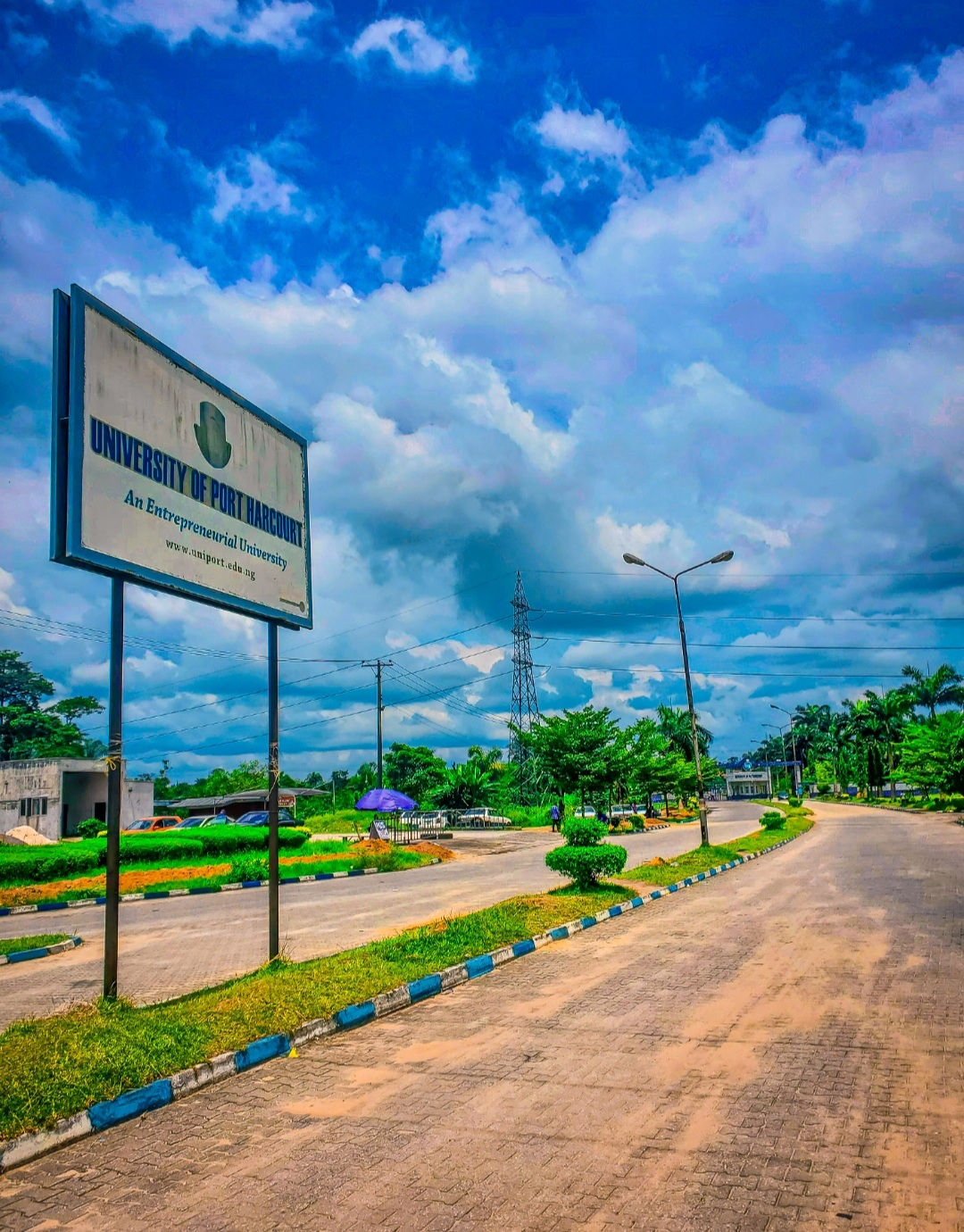
University of Port Harcourt

The University of Port Harcourt is a public research university located in Aluu and Choba, Port Harcourt, Rivers State, Nigeria. It was established in 1975 as University College, Port Harcourt and was then given university status in 1977. The University of Port Harcourt was ranked the sixth in Africa and the first in Nigeria by Times Higher Education in 2015. In July 2021, Owunari Georgewill was appointed substantive Vice-Chancellor of the university.

== School and faculties ==
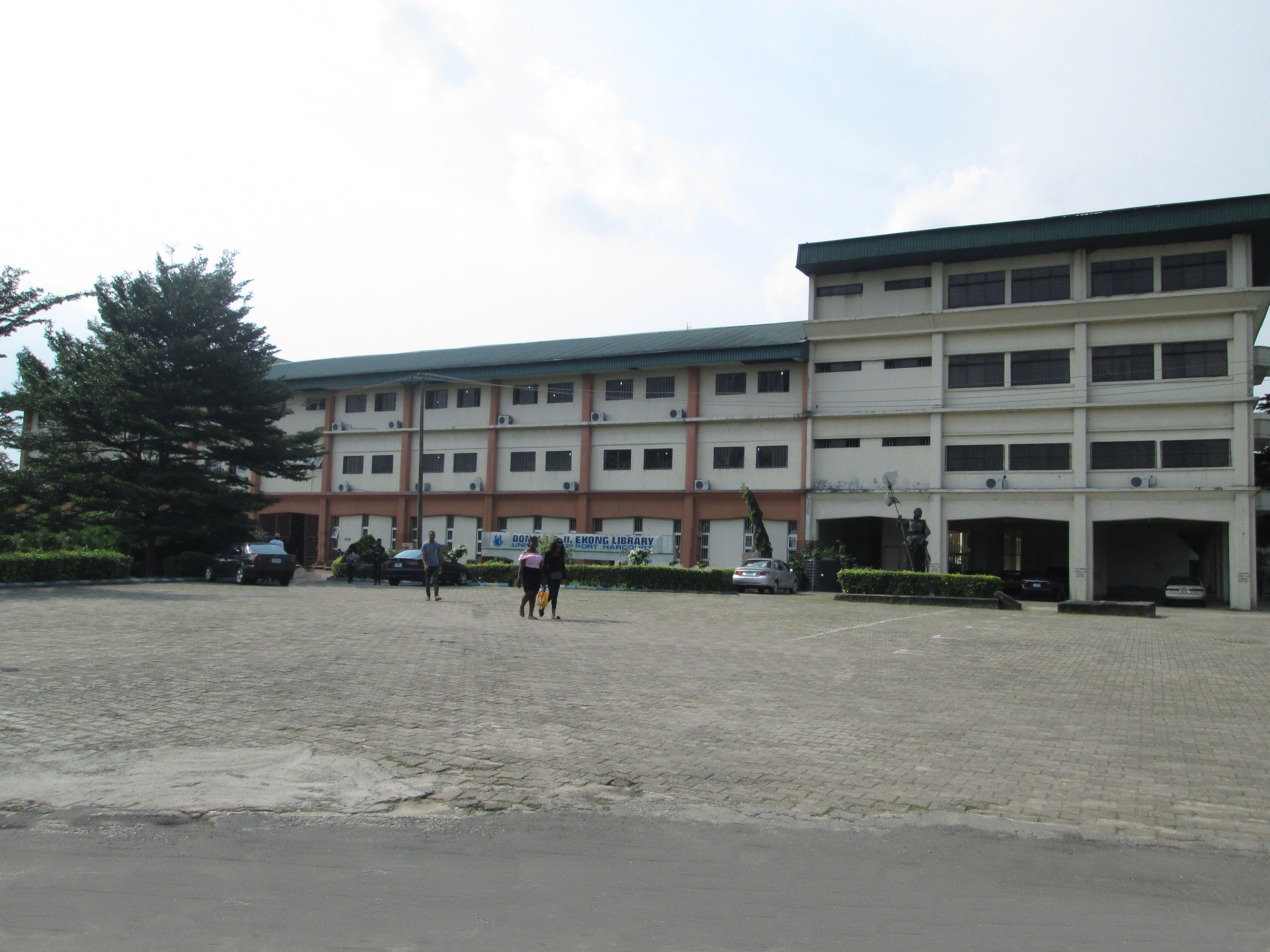
Professor Donald Ekong Library Complex

The university originally had six schools in 1977:

- School of Humanities
- School of Social Sciences
- School of Biological Sciences
- School of Chemical Sciences
- School of Physical Sciences
- School of Educational Studies
- School of Science Laboratory Technology (SSLT)

It changed from a school system to a faculty system in 1982. The university now has fourteen faculties:

- Faculty of Humanities
- Faculty of Social Sciences
- Faculty of Education
- Faculty of Engineering
- Faculty of Management Sciences
- College of Health Sciences
- Faculty of Basic Medical Sciences
- Faculty of Science
- Faculty of Dentistry
- Faculty of Computing
- Faculty of Clinical Science
- Faculty of Agriculture
- Faculty of Pharmaceutical Sciences
- School of Science Laboratory Technology
- Faculty of Law
- College of Continuing Education
- Faculty of Communication and Media Studies, the recently accredited Faculty in 2023

=== Faculties and departments ===
List of Faculties and Departments in tabular format:

S/N	FACULTIES	DEPARTMENTS
1	Faculty of Clinical Sciences	1. Internal Medicine; 2. Paediatrics and Child Health; 3. Anaesthesiology; 4. Surgery; 5. Obstetrics & Gynaecology; 6. Preventive & Social Medicine; 7. Nursing; 8. Radiology; 9. Mental Health; 10. Ear, Nose and Throat Surgery; 11. Ophthalmology
2	Faculty of Basic Medical Sciences	1. Anatomy; 2. Physiology; 3. Pharmacology; 4. Anatomical Pathology; 5. Chemical Pathology; 6. Haematology, Blood Transfusion & Immunology; 7. Medical Microbiology; 8. Medical Biochemistry
3	Faculty of Dentistry	1. Restoration Dentistry; 2. Child Dental Health; 3. Oral & Maxillofacial Surgery; 4. Preventive& Social Dentistry; 5. Oral Pathology & Oral Biology
4	Faculty of Pharmaceutical Sciences	1. Clinical Pharmacy and Management; 2. Pharmaceutical and Medicinal Chemistry; 3. Pharmaceutical Microbiology and Biotechnology; 4. Experimental Pharmacology and Toxicology
5	Faculty of Humanities	1. Department of Music; 2. Department of English Studies; 3. Department of Fine Arts and Design; 4. Department of Foreign Language & Literature; 5. Department of Religious and Cultural Studies; 6. Department of History & Diplomatic Studies; 7. Department of Philosophy; 8. Department of Theatre and Film Studies; 9. Department of Linguistics and Communication Studies
6	Faculty of Social Sciences	1. Department of Economics; 2. Department of Geography & Environmental Management; 3. Department of Sociology; 4. Department of Political & Administration Studies; 5. Department of Social work
7	Faculty of Sciences	1. Department of Animal & Environmental Biology; 2. Department of Microbiology; 3. Department of Plant Science & Biotechnology; 4. Department of Pure & Industrial Chemistry; 5. Department of Computer Science; 6. Department of Geology; 7. Department of Mathematics and Statistics; 8. Department of Physics; 9. Department of Biochemistry
8	Faculty of Education	1. Department of Adult & Non-Formal Education; 2. Department of Curriculum Studies & Educational Technology; 3. Department of Educational Foundations; 4. Department of Educational Management and Planning; 5. Department of Education Psychology, Guidance. & Counselling; 6. Department of Human Kinetics & Health Education; 7. Department Library and Information Science; 8. Department of Early Childhood and Primary Education
9	Faculty of Engineering	1. Department of Chemical Engineering; 2. Department of Petroleum Engineering; 3. Department of Civil Engineering; 4. Department of Mechanical Engineering; 5. Department of Electrical Engineering; 6. Department of Gas Engineering; 7. Department of Environmental Engineering
10	Faculty of Agriculture	1. Department of Agricultural Economics and Extension; 2. Department of Animal Science; 3. Department of Crop and Soil Science; 4. Department of Fisheries; 5. Department of Forestry and Wildlife
11	Faculty of Management Sciences	1. Department of Accounting; 2. Department of Finance and Banking; 3. Department of Management; 4. Department of Marketing; 5. Department of Hospitality Management and Tourism
12	Faculty of Computing	1. Department of Cyber Security; 2. Department of Information Technology (IT)

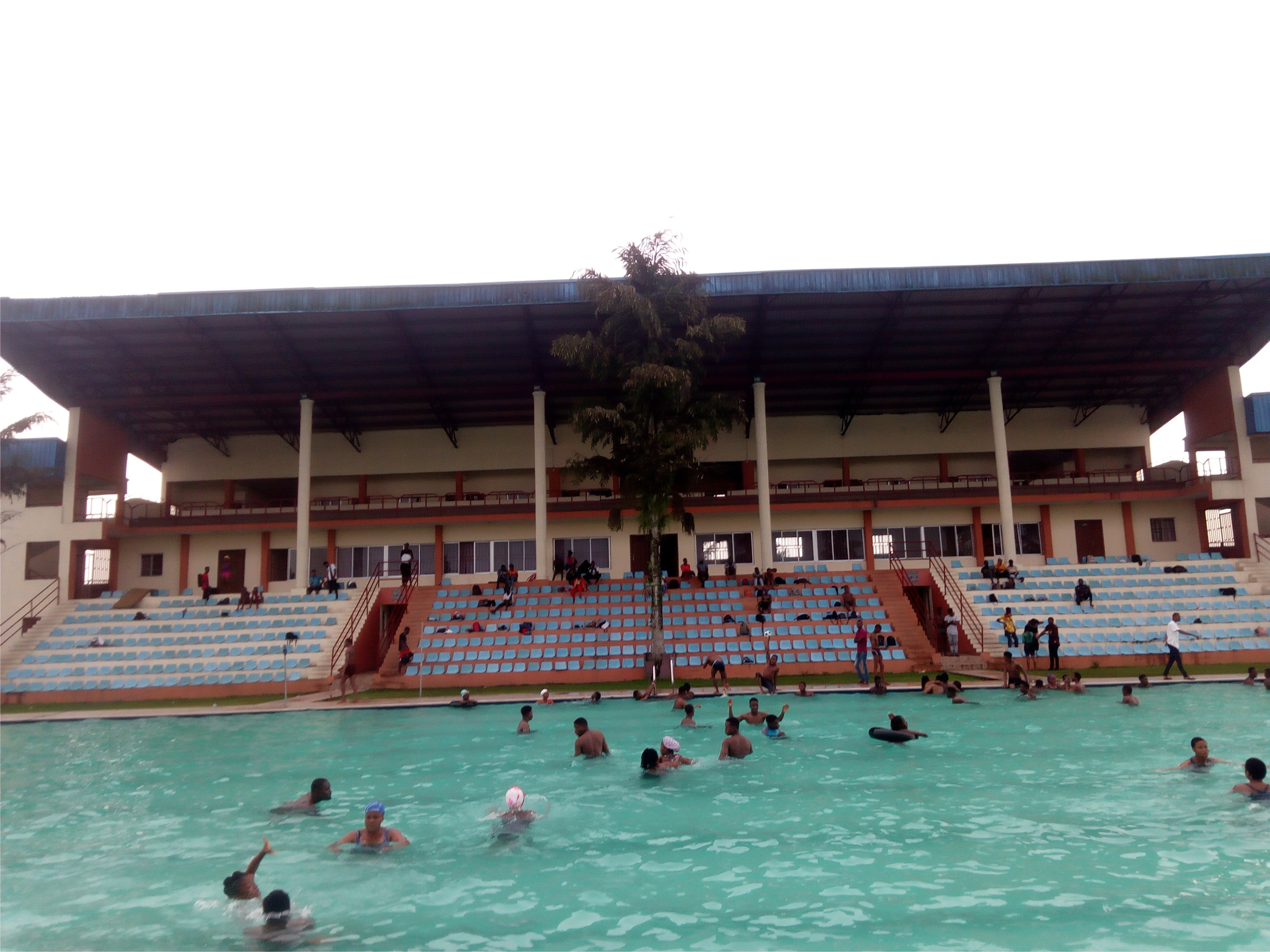
University of Port Harcourt Swimming Pool

== Former vice chancellors ==
- Prof. Okodudu Stephen- (Acting) 2020 ~2021
- Prof. Ndowa Lale - 2015 ~ 2020
- Prof. Joseph Atubokiki Ajienka - 2010 ~ 2015
- Prof. Don Baridam - 2005 ~ 2010
- Prof. Nimi Briggs - 2000 ~ 2005
- Prof. Theo Vincent - 1996 ~ 2000
- Prof. Nimi Briggs - (Acting) 1995 ~ 1996
- Prof. Ademola Salau - (Acting) 1994 ~ 1995
- Prof. Njidda M. Gadzama - (Acting) 1992 ~ 1994
- Prof. Kelsey Harrison - 1989 ~ 1992
- Prof. Sylvanus J. Cookey - 1982 ~ 1989
- Prof. Donald E. U. Ekong - 1977 ~ 1982

== Library ==
The objective of the library is derived from those of its parent institution, the University of Port Harcourt. It exists to provide books, non-book/electronic resources and ancillary services which are invaluable in extending and supporting the university’s programmes of teaching, learning and Research.

== Affiliate Institutions ==
In 1981, an affiliation protocol was approved between the University of Port Harcourt and the then College of Education, Uyo in the old Cross River State. That protocol produced graduates in Education in 1985 (see 6th Convocation brochure) and 1986. The affiliation was terminated by the upgrade of the College of Education, Uyo to a State University in 1983 by the Administration of Dr Clement Isong. That University was named University of Cross River State (UNICROSS), Uyo. When it was taken over by the Federal Government in 1991, it became what is today known as the University of Uyo (UNIUYO).Ever since, Uniport has nurtured programmes in other affiliate institutions.

Below is a list of affiliate institutions of the University of Port Harcourt approved by the National Universities Commission (NUC).

- National Missionary Seminary of St. Paul, Gwagwalada, Abuja
- Methodists Theological institute, Umuahia
- Baptist College of Theology, Obinze, Owerri

== See also ==
- List of University of Port Harcourt people
- University of Port Harcourt Teaching Hospital
- Academic libraries in Nigeria
